= Ninashanca =

Mountain in Peru

- Location within Peru

Highest point
- Elevation: 5,605 m (18,389 ft)
- Coordinates: 10°13′12″S 76°54′58″W

Geography
- Location: Huánuco Region
- Parent range: Andes, Huayhuash

Climbing
- Easiest route: NE ridge

Ninashanca is a mostly rocky mountain in the north of the Huayhuash mountain range in the Andes of Peru, 5,605 metres (18,389 ft) high. It is located in the Huánuco Region, Bolognesi Province, Pacllón District, and in the Lauricocha Province, Queropalca District, northwest of the lake Ninacocha. It is separated from Rondoy by a col 5,000 metres (16,404 ft) high. It is a mountain very rarely climbed. Base camp can be reached from the village of Chiquian in five days of trek.

The normal route is rated D and can be climbed from Mitococha by the NE ridge, gained by a 45° snow couloir then a short rock pitch followed by the corniced ridge.

== See also ==
- Jirishanca
- Rasac
