= Waylla Hirka (Cajatambo) =

Mountain in Peru

- Location within Peru

Highest point
- Elevation: 4,800 m (15,700 ft)
- Coordinates: 10°27′18″S 76°51′57″W

Geography
- Location: Peru, Lima Region, Cajatambo Province
- Parent range: Andes

Waylla Hirka (Quechua waylla meadow, Ancash Quechua hirka mountain, "meadow mountain", Hispanicized spelling Huayllajirca) is a mountain in the Andes of Peru, about 4,800 metres (15,748 ft) high. It is located in the Lima Region, Cajatambo Province, Cajatambo District. Waylla Hirka lies at the Pumarinri valley south of the Waywash mountain range, southwest of Pukaqaqa and north of Millpu. The lakes Quyllurqucha, Warmiqucha (Quechua for "woman lake", Huarmicocha) and Challwaqucha ("fish lake", Challhuacocha) lie northeast of Waylla Hirka.
