= Alcay (Huánuco) =

Mountain in Peru

- Location within Peru

Highest point
- Elevation: 5,300 m (17,400 ft)
- Coordinates: 10°13′52″S 76°53′11″W

Geography
- Location: Huánuco Region
- Parent range: Andes, Huayhuash

Alcay (possibly from Quechua for to cut halfway through, to interrupt; to fail, Hispanicized spelling Alcay) is a 5,300-metre-high (17,388 ft) mountain in the north of the Huayhuash mountain range in the Andes of Peru. It is located in the Huánuco Region, Lauricocha Province, Queropalca District. Alcay lies northwest of a lake named Carhuacocha, east of Mituraju and southeast of Rondoy. The little lake northeast of the mountain is Alcaycocha.

== See also ==
- Ninacocha
- Carhuacocha
