= Yanacushman =

Mountain in Peru

- Location within Peru

Highest point
- Elevation: 4,800 m (15,700 ft)
- Coordinates: 10°23′49″S 76°59′20″W

Geography
- Location: Peru, Lima Region, Cajatambo Province
- Parent range: Andes, Huayhuash

Yanacushman (possibly from Quechua yana black, kusma (or kushma in the local variant) nightdress, shirt of a woman, "black nightdress" or "black shirt", -n a suffix) is a mountain in the Huayhuash mountain range in the Andes of Peru, about 4,800 m (15,748 ft) high. It is located in the Lima Region, Cajatambo Province, Cajatambo District. Yanacushman lies on the southern sub-range west of the main range, northwest of Julcán and Huacshash. It is situated between the Huayllapa valley and the Pumarinri valley.
