= Oyon =

Oyon may refer to:

- Oyón Province, a province of the Lima Region, Peru
- Oyón, Peru, the capital of Oyón province, Peru
- Oyón-Oion, a municipality in Álava province, Spain
