= Puscanturpa =

Mountain in Peru

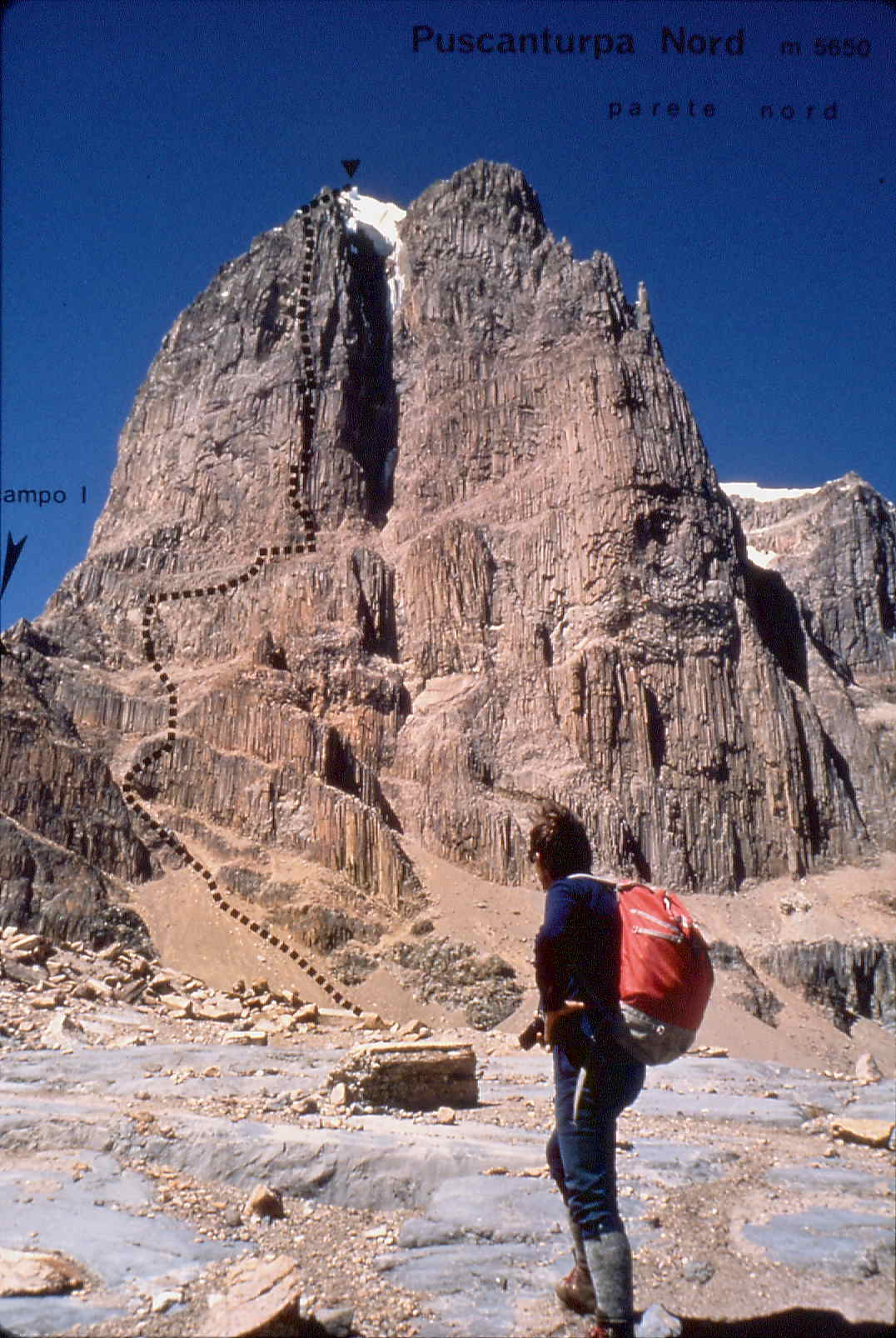
- Puscanturpa Norte

Highest point
- Elevation: 5,652 m (18,543 ft)
- Coordinates: 10°22′02″S 76°51′51″W

Naming
- Language of name: Quechua

Geography
- Location within Peru
- Location: Peru, Huánuco Region, Lima Region
- Parent range: Andes, Huayhuash

Climbing
- First ascent: 1954, Manfred Bachmann, Karl Lugmayer, Siegfried Aeberli and Waldemar Gruber

Puscanturpa (possibly from Quechua puchka, puska spindle, -n a suffix, t'urpu pointed, sharp,) is a mountain group in the south of the Huayhuash mountain range in the Andes of Peru. It is located in the Huánuco Region, Lauricocha Province, Jesús District, and in the Lima Region, Cajatambo Province, Cajatambo District. Puscanturpa lies northwest of the lake and the mountain named Suerococha and northeast of Cuyoc.

The two highest summits in the group are the pyramidal Puscanturpa Norte 5,652 m (18,543 ft) and Puscanturpa Sur 5,500 m (18,000 ft). Other tops are Puscanturpa Central 5,442 m (17,854 ft) and the rock-spire of Puscanturpa Este 5,410 m (17,750 ft).

== Climbing History ==
Puscanturpa Norte: The first recorded ascent of Puscanturpa Norte, the highest point in the group, was made in 1954 by Manfred Bachmann, Karl Lugmayer, Siegfried Aeberli and Waldemar Gruber, members of an Austrian group led by Hans Kinzl.

Puscanturpa Sur: Aeberli and Wastl Mariner reached the summit ridge of Puscanturpa Sur during the Austrian expedition in 1954 but they were avalanched from the summit arete. It was 1964 when a Swiss climber, Julius Hensler, made the first ascent with the Peruvian Pedro Baltazar; they also made the second ascent of Puscanturpa Central.

Puscanturpa Este: The most spectacular peak in the group is the rock-spire of Puscanturpa Este. The first recorded ascent of Puscanturpa Este was made in 1986 via the 450m north-west ridge by three members of British expedition led by John Nixon. The ridge had previously been attempted by Germans.

The Slovenian team of Pavle Kozjek and Grega Kresel made an ascent of the more technical east face of Puscanturpa Este in 2007.

Yasushi Yamanoi and Masaru Noda made the first ascent of the south-east face of Puscanturpa Este in 2013.
