= Yuraq Qaqa (Lima) =

Mountain in Peru

- Location within Peru

Highest point
- Elevation: 5,000 m (16,000 ft)
- Coordinates: 10°25′48″S 76°54′08″W

Geography
- Location: Peru, Lima Region
- Parent range: Andes, Waywash

Yuraq Qaqa (Quechua yuraq white, qaqa rock, "white rock", Hispanicized spelling Yurac Ccacca) is a mountain in the Waywash in the Andes of Peru, about 5,000 metres (16,404 ft) high. It is situated in the Lima Region, Cajatambo Province, Cajatambo District. Yuraq Qaqa lies southwest of Pumarinri at the Pumarinri valley.
