= Mituraju =

Mountain in Peru

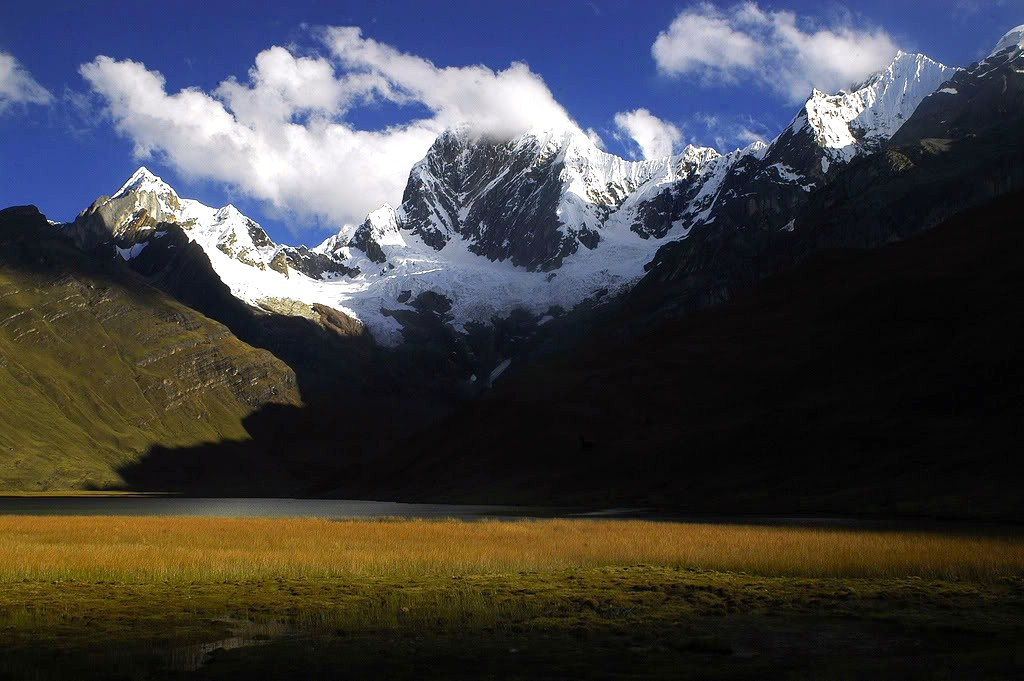
- Mituraju (center-right) and Rondoy as seen from Lake Mitucocha

Highest point
- Elevation: 5,750 m (18,860 ft)
- Coordinates: 10°13′48″S 76°54′51″W

Geography
- Location within Peru
- Location: Ancash Region, Huánuco Region
- Parent range: Andes, Huayhuash

Mituraju (possibly from Quechua mit'u, mitu mud, rahu snow, ice, mountain with snow) is a 5,750-metre-high (18,865 ft) mountain in the north of the Huayhuash mountain range in the Andes of Peru. It is located in the Ancash Region, Bolognesi Province, Pacllón District, and in the Huánuco Region, Lauricocha Province, Queropalca District. Mituraju lies southeast of Rondoy and southwest of Lake Mitucocha.

== See also ==
- Ninacocha
- Carhuacocha
