= Puka Qaqa (disambiguation) =

Puka Qaqa (Quechua puka red, qaqa rock, "red rock", Hispanicized spellings Puca Khakha, Pucacaca, Pucacacca, Pucaccacca, Pucagaga, Pucajaga, Pucajaja, Pukaccacca) may refer to:

- Pucacaca District, a district in the San Martín Region, Peru, and its seat
- Puka Qaqa, a mountain in the Cajatambo District, Cajatambo Province, Lima Region, Peru
- Puka Qaqa (Bolivia), a mountain in the Chuquisaca Department, Bolivia
- Puka Qaqa (Bolognesi), a mountain in the Bolognesi Province, Ancash Region, Peru
- Puka Qaqa (Muntiqucha), a mountain near Muntiqucha in the Cajatambo District, Cajatambo Province, Lima Region, Peru
- Puka Qaqa (Recuay), a mountain in the Recuay Province, Ancash Region, Peru
