= Pariauccro =

Mountain in Peru

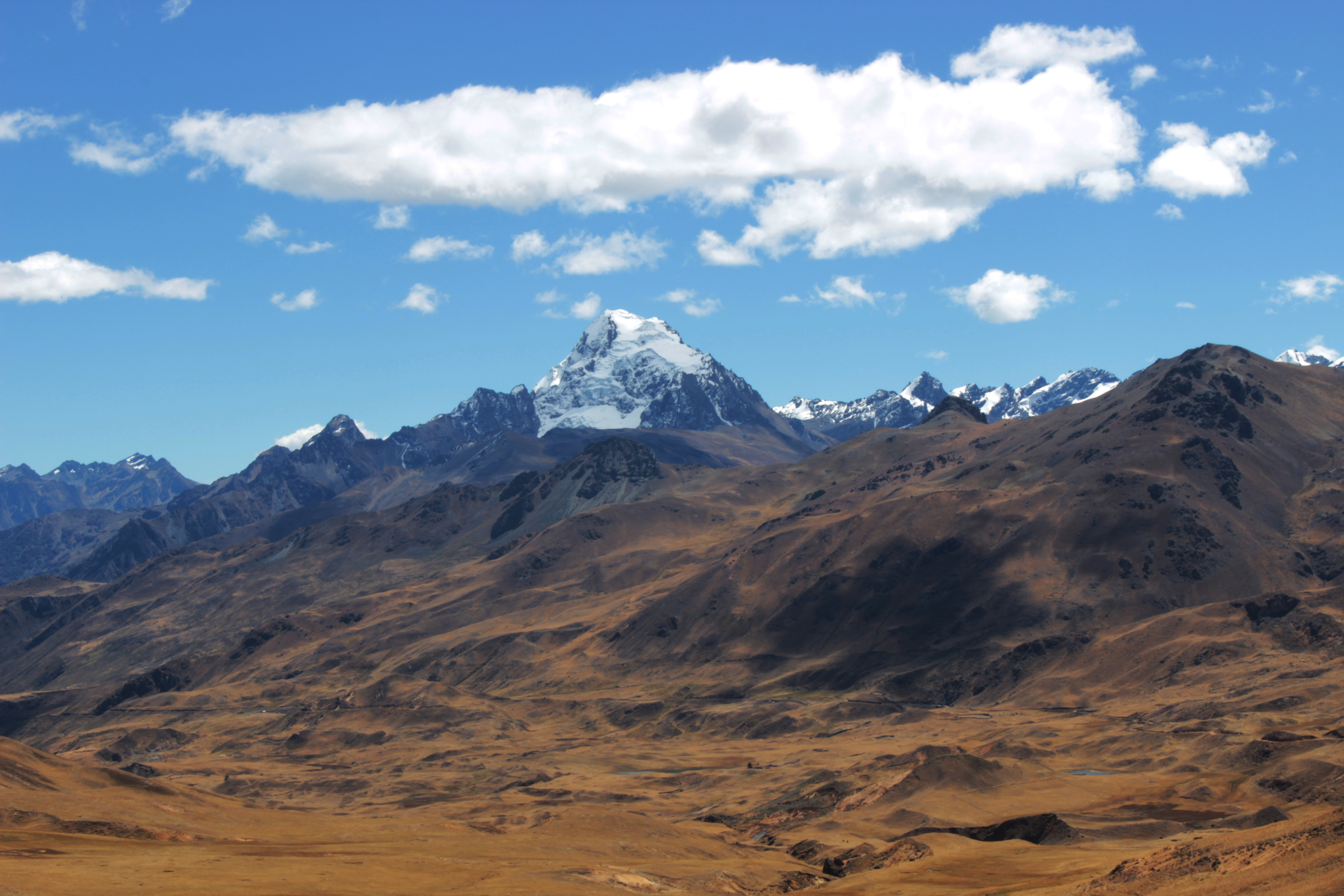
- Huacshash (center) with the peaks of Pariauccro massif in the background (on the right)

Highest point
- Elevation: 5,572 m (18,281 ft)
- Coordinates: 10°24′21″S 76°56′00″W

Geography
- Location within Peru
- Location: Peru, Lima Region, Cajatambo Province
- Parent range: Andes, Huayhuash

Pariauccro or Pariaucro (possibly from Quechua parya reddish, copper or sparrow, ukru hole, pit, hollow) is a massif in the Huayhuash mountain range in the Andes of Peru. This mountain has two summits (Pariauccro Grande and Pariauccro Chico), the highest one reaching an altitude of 5,572 m (18,281 ft). It is located in the Lima Region, Cajatambo Province, Cajatambo District. Pariauccro lies on a sub-range west of the main range, north of Mitopunta and northeast of Huacshash.
