= Isqiraqucha =

Mountain in Peru

- Location within Peru

Highest point
- Elevation: 5,200 m (17,100 ft)
- Coordinates: 10°30′59″S 76°49′58″W

Geography
- Location: Peru, Lima Region, Cajatambo Province, Oyón Province
- Parent range: Andes

Isqiraqucha (Quechua isqira mud, qucha lake, "mud lake", Hispanicized spelling Esgueracocha) is a mountain in the Andes of Peru near a small lake of that name. It reaches an altitude of approximately 5,200 m (17,100 ft). The mountain and the lake are located in the Lima Region, Oyón Province, Oyón District.

The lake named Isqiraqucha lies southeast of the peak at 10°32′33″S 76°49′22″W.
