= Muki =

Muki may refer to:

- Muki (film), a 1944 Hungarian comedy film directed by Ákos Ráthonyi
- Muki (Huancaya-Tomas), a mountain on the border of the districts of Huancaya and Tomas in the Yauyos Province, Lima Region, Peru
- Muki (Lima), a mountain in the Tanta District, Yauyos Province, Lima Region, Peru
- Muki (mythology), a mythological figure of the Andes
- Muki (Oyón), a mountain in the Oyón Province, Lima Region, Peru
- Muki (singer) or Daniel Niv or Mooke (sometimes styled as Mook D.) (born 1975), Israeli singer and rapper, best known as the frontman for successful Israeli hip hop/punk act Shabak Samech
- Rosa Bonaparte, East Timorese revolutionary and women's rights activist, known by the nickname "Muki"
- Sagi Muki (born 1992), Israeli judoka
