= Chanca =

Chanca or Chanka may refer to:

- Chanca people, an ethnic group of Peru
- Chanca Quechua, a language of Peru
- Chhanka, a mountain in Peru
- Cerro Chanka, a lava dome in Peru
- Chança River, a river in Spain and Portugal

== See also ==
- Diego Álvarez Chanca, 15th-century Spanish physician
