= Churin =

- Town
- Location within Peru
- Coordinates: 10°49′S 76°53′W
- Country: Peru
- Region: Lima
- Province: Oyon
- District: Pachangara
- Elevation: 2,258 m (7,408 ft)

Population (2007)
  - Total: 1,889
- Time zone: UTC-5 (PET)
  - Summer (DST): UTC-5 (PET)

Churin is a town in Oyon Province, Peru.

In Proto-Quechuan, the word churin means "your child".

The city holds two annual festivals. The Annual Maca Festival celebrates maca, an aphrodisiac food. The town also has an annual festival revolving around the food and cultural icon of the cuy, or guinea pig. The festivities involve dressing the guinea pigs in elaborate costumes for a competition.

Churin is also well known for its hot springs.
