= Hirka Kancha =

Mountain in Peru

- Location within Peru

Highest point
- Elevation: 5,000 m (16,000 ft)
- Coordinates: 10°30′03″S 76°48′25″W

Geography
- Location: Peru, Lima Region, Cajatambo Province, Oyón Province
- Parent range: Andes

Hirka Kancha (Quechua hirka mountain, kancha corral, hispanicized spelling Jircacancha) is a mountain in the Andes of Peru, about 5,000 m (16,000 ft) high. It is located in the Lima Region, Oyón Province, Oyón District.
