= Gasha (Peru) =

Mountain in Peru

- Location within Peru

Highest point
- Elevation: 4,880 m (16,010 ft)
- Coordinates: 10°09′50″S 76°54′45″W

Geography
- Location: Peru, Ancash Region, Huánuco Region
- Parent range: Andes, Huayhuash

Gasha (possibly from Quechua kasha thorn or spine) is a 4,880-metre-high (16,010 ft) mountain in the northern part of the Huayhuash mountain range in the Andes of Peru. It is located in the Ancash Region, Bolognesi Province, Pacllón District, and in the Huánuco Region, Lauricocha Province, Queropalca District. Gasha lies northwest of Mitococha and north of Paria.
