= Kunkush (disambiguation) =

Kunkush (Ancash Quechua for Puya raimondii, also spelled Cuncush) may refer to:

- Kunkush, a mountain in the Recuay Province, Ancash Region, Peru
- Kunkush (Bolognesi), a mountain in the Bolognesi Province, Ancash Region, Peru
- Kunkush (Huari), a mountain in the Huari Province, Ancash Region, Peru
- Kunkush (Lima), a mountain in the Lima Region, Peru
