= Julcán =

Mountain in Peru

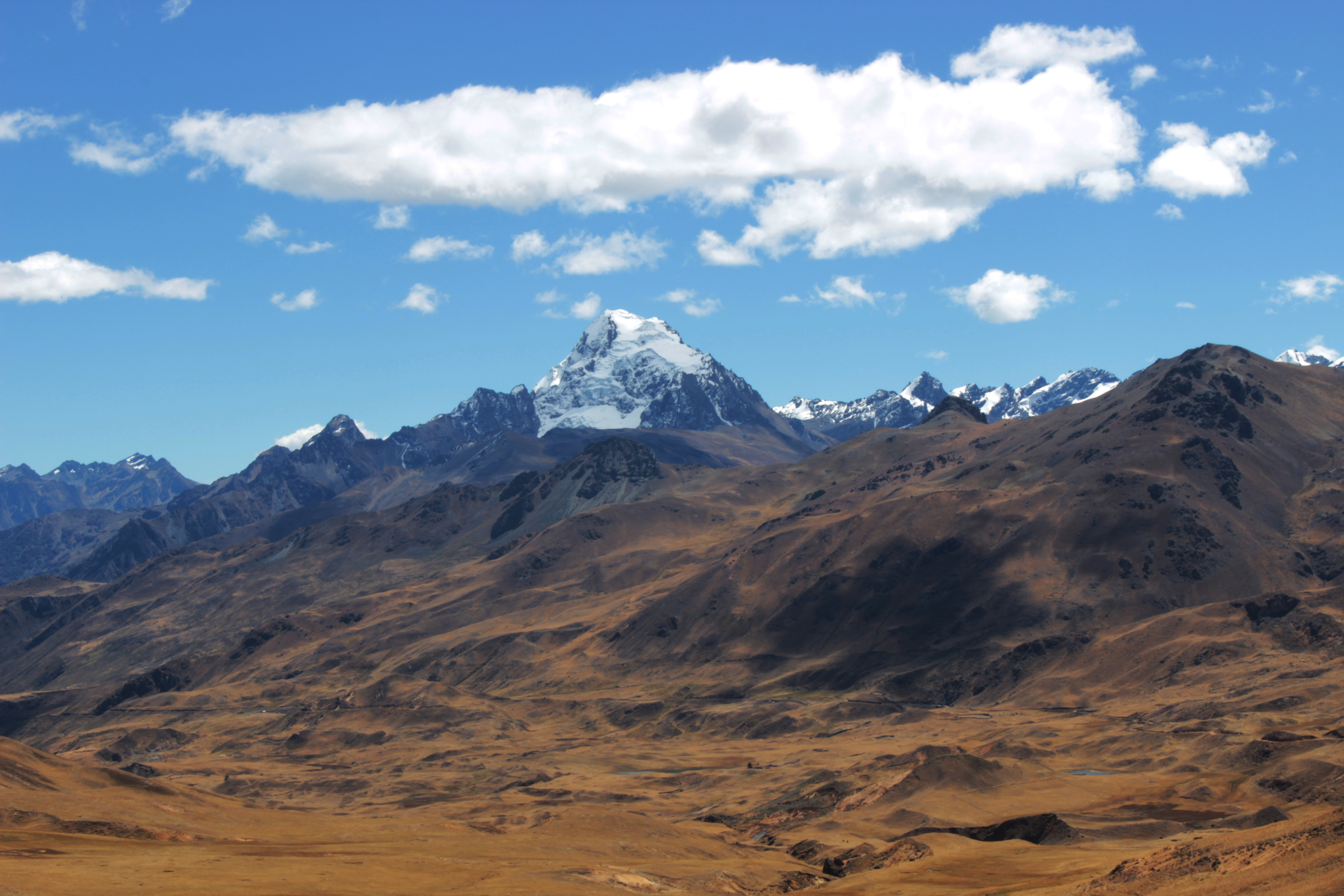
- Huacshash with Julcán and Socojirca in the foreground

Highest point
- Elevation: 4,900 m (16,100 ft)
- Coordinates: 10°26′25″S 76°57′59″W

Geography
- Location within Peru
- Location: Peru, Lima Region, Cajatambo Province
- Parent range: Andes, Huayhuash

Julcán (possibly from Quechua qullqa, deposit, storehouse, -n a suffix) is a 4,900-metre-high (16,076 ft) mountain in the Huayhuash mountain range in the Andes of Peru. It is located in the Lima Region, Cajatambo Province, Cajatambo District. Julcán lies on a sub-range west of the main range, southwest of Mitopunta and southeast of Huacshash. It is situated north of the Pumarinri valley.
