= Mishihuajanan =

Mountain in Peru

- Location within Peru

Highest point
- Elevation: 5,100 m (16,700 ft)
- Coordinates: 10°30′29″S 76°51′33″W

Geography
- Location: Peru, Lima Region, Cajatambo Province, Oyón Province
- Parent range: Andes

Mishihuajanan (possibly from Ancash Quechua mishi cat, Quechua waqay crying, to cry, -na a suffix, "where the cat cries", -n a suffix) is a mountain in the Andes of Peru, about 5,100 m (16,700 ft) high. It is located in the Lima Region, Cajatambo Province, Cajatambo District, and in the Oyón Province, Oyón District. Mishihuajanan lies southwest of Millpo and north of Huayllajirca.
