= Cajatambo province =

Province of Peru

Coordinates: 10°20′08″S 76°50′03″W

Cajatambo
- Province
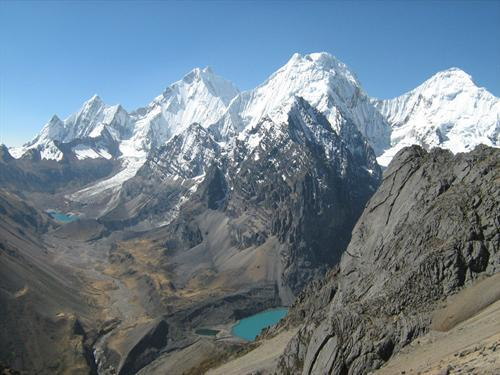
- Peaks of the Waywash mountain range on the eastern border of the province as seen from the south

- Location of Cajatambo in Lima
- Country: Peru
- Department: Lima
- Capital: Cajatambo

Government
  - Mayor: José Del Carmen Flores Fuentes Rivera (2019–2022)

Area
  - Total: 1,515.21 km^{2} (585.03 sq mi)
- Elevation: 3,376 m (11,076 ft)

Population
  - Total: 6,559
  - Density: 4.329/km^{2} (11.21/sq mi)
- UBIGEO: 1503

Cajatambo is a province of the department of Lima, Peru. From the administrative point of view of the Catholic Church in Peru, it forms part of the Diocese of Huacho. It is bordered to the north by the Ancash Region, to the east by the Huánuco Region, to the south by the province of Oyón, and to the west by the province of Huaura. Its capital is Cajatambo.

== History ==
From 1851 to 1916 Cajatambo was part of Ancash Region and also included the areas of the provinces of Bolognesi and Ocros, which remained in that region. Bolognesi, including Ocros until 1990, split from Cajatambo in 1903; in 1916 Cajatambo was given to Lima Region.

== Geography ==
The Waywash mountain range traverses the province. Some of the highest mountains of the province are listed below:

- Awkillu
- Awkin
- Ayar Mach'ay
- Challwaqucha
- Chhanka
- Ch'ura
- Ichik Qayqu
- Mataqucha
- Millpu
- Mishi Waqanan
- Mit'u Punta
- Muntiqucha
- Parya Ukru
- Pishtaq
- Puka Parya
- Puka Qaqa
- Puka Qaqa (Mun.)
- Pumarinri
- Punta Rukma
- Puskan T'urpu
- Puywan
- Phasa Pukyu
- Phuyuq
- P'ukru
- Qullqan
- Qulluta Warkhu
- Qupan
- Q'ara Chuku
- Q'aramarka
- Rahu Qulluta
- Rasaq
- Rukma
- Sarapu
- Suyruqucha
- Shawaq
- T'uruqucha
- Utkhush
- Wakrish
- Wanchaq
- Waqra
- Waqra Punta
- Waqshash
- Wathiyaqucha
- Waylla Hirka
- Waylla Hirka (Caj.)
- Yana Kushman
- Yana Hirka
- Yana K'uchu
- Yana Paryan
- Yana Uqsha
- Yura Hirka
- Yuraq Qaqa

== Administrative divisions ==
The province is divided into five districts:

- Cajatambo
- Copa
- Gorgor
- Huancapón
- Manas

== Population ==
The province has a population of approximately 10,000 people.

== Industry ==
Historically, the principal products of the province have been cattle and sheep, although cochineal is also produced in the area.

== See also ==
- Quyllurqucha
