= Isku (disambiguation) =

Isku is a mountain in the Andes of Peru.

Isku may also refer to:

- Isku Areena, an arena in Lahti, Finland
- Isku-class motor torpedo boat, a ship class of the Finnish Navy
- Tampereen Isku-Volley, a Finnish volleyball team
