= Puka Qaqa (Muntiqucha) =

Mountain in Peru

- Location within Peru

Highest point
- Elevation: 4,800 m (15,700 ft)
- Coordinates: 10°30′09″S 76°53′41″W

Geography
- Location: Peru, Lima Region, Cajatambo Province
- Parent range: Andes

Puka Qaqa (Quechua puka red, qaqa rock, "red rock", Hispanicized spelling Pucaccacca) is a mountain in the Andes of Peru, about 4,800 metres (15,748 ft) high. It is located in the Lima Region, Cajatambo Province, Cajatambo District. Puka Qaqa lies south of the Waywash mountain range, northwest of Yana Hirka and south of a mountain named Muntiqucha.
