= Allqay (disambiguation) =

Allqay (Quechua for to cut halfway through, also spelled Alcay, Alcoy, Algay, Allcay) may refer to:

- Allqay, a mountain on the border of the Lima Region and the Junín Region, Peru
- Allqay (Chaulán), a mountain in the Chaulán District, Huánuco Province, Huánuco Region, Peru
- Allqay (Huánuco), a mountain in the Lauricocha Province, Huánuco Region, Peru
