= Paria (Peru) =

Mountain in Peru

- Location within Peru

Highest point
- Elevation: 5,190 m (17,030 ft)
- Coordinates: 10°11′37″S 76°54′42″W

Geography
- Location: Peru, Ancash Region, Huánuco Region
- Parent range: Andes, Huayhuash

Paria (possibly from Quechua for reddish, copper or sparrow,) is a 5,190-metre-high (17,028 ft) mountain in the northern part of the Huayhuash mountain range in the Andes of Peru. It is located in the Ancash Region, Bolognesi Province, Pacllón District, and in the Huánuco Region, Lauricocha Province, Queropalca District. Paria lies northwest of Mitococha and south of Gasha.
