= Yana Uqsha (disambiguation) =

Yana Uqsha (Quechua yana black, uqsha high altitude grass, Hispanicized spellings Yana Ucsha, Yanahucsha, Yanahojsha, Yanaocsha, Yanaucsha, Yanauscha, also Yanauksha) may refer to:

- Yana Uqsha, a mountain at a little lake of that name in the Junín Region, Peru
- Yana Uqsha (Ayacucho), a mountain in the Ayacucho Region, Peru
- Yana Uqsha (Cajatambo), a mountain in the Cajatambo Province, Lima Region, Peru
- Yana Uqsha (Lima), a mountain in the Huaral Province, Lima Region, Peru
