= Montecocha =

Mountain in Peru

- Location within Peru

Highest point
- Elevation: 5,200 m (17,100 ft)
- Coordinates: 10°29′06″S 76°53′48″W

Geography
- Location: Lima Region, Peru
- Parent range: Huayhuash, Andes

Montecocha (possibly from local Quechua munti tree; forest, Quechua qucha lake, "tree lake" or "forest lake") is a mountain in the Andes of Peru, about 5,200 metres (17,060 ft) high. It is located in Cajatambo District, Cajatambo Province, Lima Region. Montecocha lies south of the Huayhuash mountain range, southwest of Millpo and east of a mountain named Shahuanacocha.
