= Yanajirca (Lima) =

Mountain in Peru

- Location within Peru

Highest point
- Elevation: 4,600 m (15,100 ft)
- Coordinates: 10°30′46″S 76°53′18″W

Geography
- Location: Peru, Lima Region
- Parent range: Andes

Yanajirca or Yana Hirka (Quechua yana black, Ancash Quechua hirka mountain, "black mountain", also spelled Yanajirca) is a mountain in the Andes of Peru, about 4,600 m (15,100 ft) high. It is located in the Lima Region, Cajatambo Province, Cajatambo District. Yana Hirka is southwest of Mishi Waqanan and northwest of Pishtaq.
