= Lake Chaupicocha =

Lake Chaupicocha may refer to:

- Lake Chaupicocha (Lima), a lake in Lima Region, Peru
- Lake Chaupicocha (Puno), a lake in Puno Region, Peru
