= Wanquyru =

Mountain in Peru

- Location within Peru

Highest point
- Elevation: 4,600 m (15,100 ft)
- Coordinates: 10°43′48″S 76°41′28″W

Geography
- Location: Peru, Lima Region
- Parent range: Andes

Wanquyru (Quechua for bee, hispanicized spelling Huanguyro) is a mountain in the Andes of Peru, about 4,600 m (15,100 ft) high. It is located in the Lima Region, Oyón Province, Oyón District. Wanquyru lies at the Puka Yaku valley, southwest of Quyllur.
