= Huancapón District =

Coordinates: 10.5494°S 77.1120°W

Huancapón Wankapun
- District
- Interactive map of Huancapón
- Country: Peru
- Region: Lima
- Province: Cajatambo
- Founded: September 25, 1868
- Capital: Huancapón

Government
  - Mayor: Miguel Dante Ventocilla (2019-2022)

Area
  - Total: 146.1 km^{2} (56.4 sq mi)
- Elevation: 3,145 m (10,318 ft)

Population (2017)
  - Total: 984
  - Density: 6.74/km^{2} (17.4/sq mi)
- Time zone: UTC-5 (PET)
- UBIGEO: 150304

Huancapón District is one of five districts of the province Cajatambo in Peru.
