= Isku =

Mountain in Peru

- Location within Peru

Highest point
- Elevation: 5,000 m (16,000 ft)
- Coordinates: 10°36′52″S 76°42′26″W

Geography
- Location: Peru, Lima Region, Oyón Province
- Parent range: Andes

Isku (Quechua for lime, Hispanicized spelling Iscu) is a mountain in the Andes of Peru, about 5,000 metres (16,404 ft) high. It is located in the Lima Region, Oyón Province, Oyón District. Isku lies southeast of Yana Uqhu.
