= Aququcha (Lima) =

Mountain in Peru

- Location within Peru

Highest point
- Elevation: 5,000 m (16,000 ft)
- Coordinates: 10°46′07″S 76°40′55″W

Geography
- Location: Peru, Lima Region
- Parent range: Andes

Aququcha (Quechua aqu sand, qucha lake, "sand lake", Hispanicized spelling Acococha) is a mountain in the Andes of Peru, about 5,000 m (16,000 ft) high. It is located in the Lima Region, Oyón Province, Oyón District. Aququcha lies at the Puka Yaku valley, east of Kinwa Ukru.
