= Yawarqucha (Lima) =

Mountain in Peru

- Location within Peru

Highest point
- Elevation: 5,000 m (16,000 ft)
- Coordinates: 10°50′49″S 76°37′37″W

Geography
- Location: Peru, Lima Region
- Parent range: Andes

Yawarqucha (Quechua yawar blood, qucha lake, "blood lake", Hispanicized spelling Yahuarcocha) is a mountain at a small lake of that name in the Andes of Peru, about 5,000 metres (16,404 ft) high. It is located in the Lima Region, Oyón Province, Oyón District.

The lake named Yawarqucha lies west of the mountain at 10°50′56″S 76°37′09″W.
