= Queropalca District =

Coordinates: 10°10′45″S 76°48′10″W

Queropalca Qirupallqa
- District
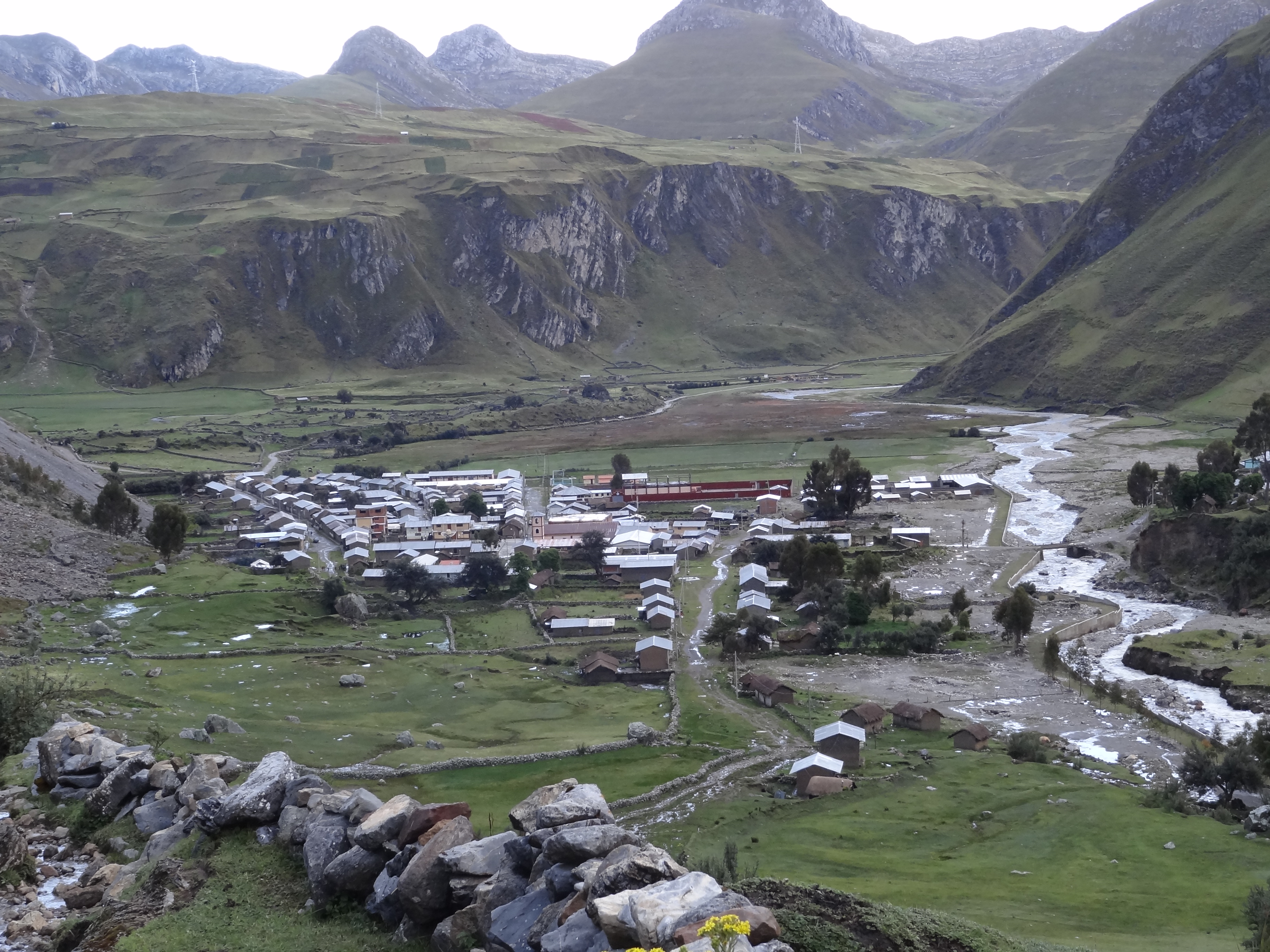
- Queropalca
- Interactive map of Queropalca
- Country: Peru
- Region: Huánuco
- Province: Lauricocha
- Founded: May 12, 1962
- Capital: Queropalca

Government
  - Mayor: Hitler Mussolini Simeón Flores

Area
  - Total: 131.15 km^{2} (50.64 sq mi)
- Elevation: 3,831 m (12,569 ft)

Population (2005 census)
  - Total: 849
  - Density: 6.47/km^{2} (16.8/sq mi)
- Time zone: UTC-5 (PET)
- UBIGEO: 101004

Queropalca District is one of seven districts of the province Lauricocha in Peru.

== History ==
The district gained media attention following its mayoral election in 2026, which was won by left leaning Ahora Nación candidate Hitler Mussolini Simeón Flores, who shares his name with the last names of Adolf Hitler and Benito Mussolini.

== Geography ==
The Waywash mountain range traverses the district. The highest peak of the district is Yerupaja at 6,635 m (21,768 ft) which is also the highest elevation of the range. Other mountains are listed below:

- Allqay
- Chawpi Hanka
- Chinkana
- Kasha
- Kuntur Waqanan
- Llamt'a
- Mit'urahu
- Parya
- Runtuy
- T'uyu Hirka

== See also ==
- Mit'uqucha
- Ninaqucha
- Qarwaqucha
