= Awkin =

Mountain in Peru

- Location within Peru

Highest point
- Elevation: 5,183 m (17,005 ft)
- Coordinates: 10°35′04″S 76°51′56″W

Geography
- Location: Peru, Lima Region, Cajatambo Province, Oyón Province
- Parent range: Andes

Awkin (Quechua awki prince; a mythical figure of the Andean culture; grandfather, -n a suffix, Hispanicized spelling Auquin) is a 5,183-metre-high (17,005 ft) mountain in the Andes of Peru. It is located in the Lima Region, Cajatambo Province, on the border of the districts of Cajatambo and Gorgor, and in the Oyón Province, Oyón District.
