= Yana Uqsha (Cajatambo) =

Mountain in Peru

- Location within Peru

Highest point
- Elevation: 4,800 m (15,700 ft)
- Coordinates: 10°31′51″S 76°54′39″W

Geography
- Location: Peru, Lima Region
- Parent range: Andes

Yana Uqsha (Quechua yana black, very dark, uqsha (locally), uqsa high altitude grass, Hispanicized spelling Yanaocsha) is a mountain in the Andes of Peru, about 4,800 m (15,700 ft) high. It is located in the Lima Region, Cajatambo Province, Cajatambo District. Yana Uqsha lies northwest of Pishtaq.
