= Colorcocha (Lima) =

Lake in the Lima Region in Peru

- Location within Peru
- Location: Lima Region, Cajatambo Province
- Coordinates: 10°26′33″S 76°51′26″W
- Basin countries: Peru
- Surface elevation: 4,500 m (14,800 ft)

Colorcocha or Collorcocha (possibly from Quechua quyllur star, qucha lake, "star lake") is a lake in the Lima Region in Peru. It is located in the Cajatambo Province, Cajatambo District. Quyllurqucha lies in the Pumarinri valley south of the Huayhuash mountain range, between Pucaccacca in the north and Millpo in the south. The lakes named Huarmicocha (possibly in Quechua Warmiqucha, "woman lake") and Challhuacocha (possibly in Quechua Challwaqucha, "fish lake") lie west.

== See also ==
- List of lakes in Peru
