= Intipanawin =

Archaeological site in Peru

- Location within Peru
- 10.23636°S 77.07311°W
- Location: Peru, Ancash Region, Bolognesi Province, Pacllon District

Site notes
- Height: 3,569 metres (11,709 ft)

Intipanawin or Intipa Ñawin (Quechua inti sun, ñawi eye, -pa, -n suffixes, "eye of the sun", also spelled Intipanawin) is an archaeological site and the name of a mountain with rock paintings in Peru. It is situated in the Ancash Region, Bolognesi Province, Pacllon District, at a height of about 3,569 metres (11,709 ft). Beside the painting of the eye of the sun there are also paintings of llamas nearby which draw the attention.
