= Suerococha (Cajatambo) =

Mountain in Peru

- Location within Peru

Highest point
- Elevation: 5,000 m (16,000 ft)
- Listing: List of mountains in Peru
- Coordinates: 10°23′10″S 76°51′20″W

Naming
- Language of name: Quechua

Geography
- Location: Peru, Lima Region
- Parent range: Andes, Huayhuash

Suerococha (possibly from Quechua suyru a very long dress tracked after when worn, qucha lake) is a mountain in the south of the Huayhuash mountain range in the Andes of Peru, about 5,000 metres (16,404 ft) high, and the name of a small lake near the mountain. The mountain is located in the Lima Region, Cajatambo Province, Cajatambo District. It lies east of Cuyoc.

The mountain is named after the lake east of it at 10°23′00″S 76°51′06″W.
