= Oyón District =

Coordinates: 10.6684°S 76.7702°W

Oyón Uyun
- District
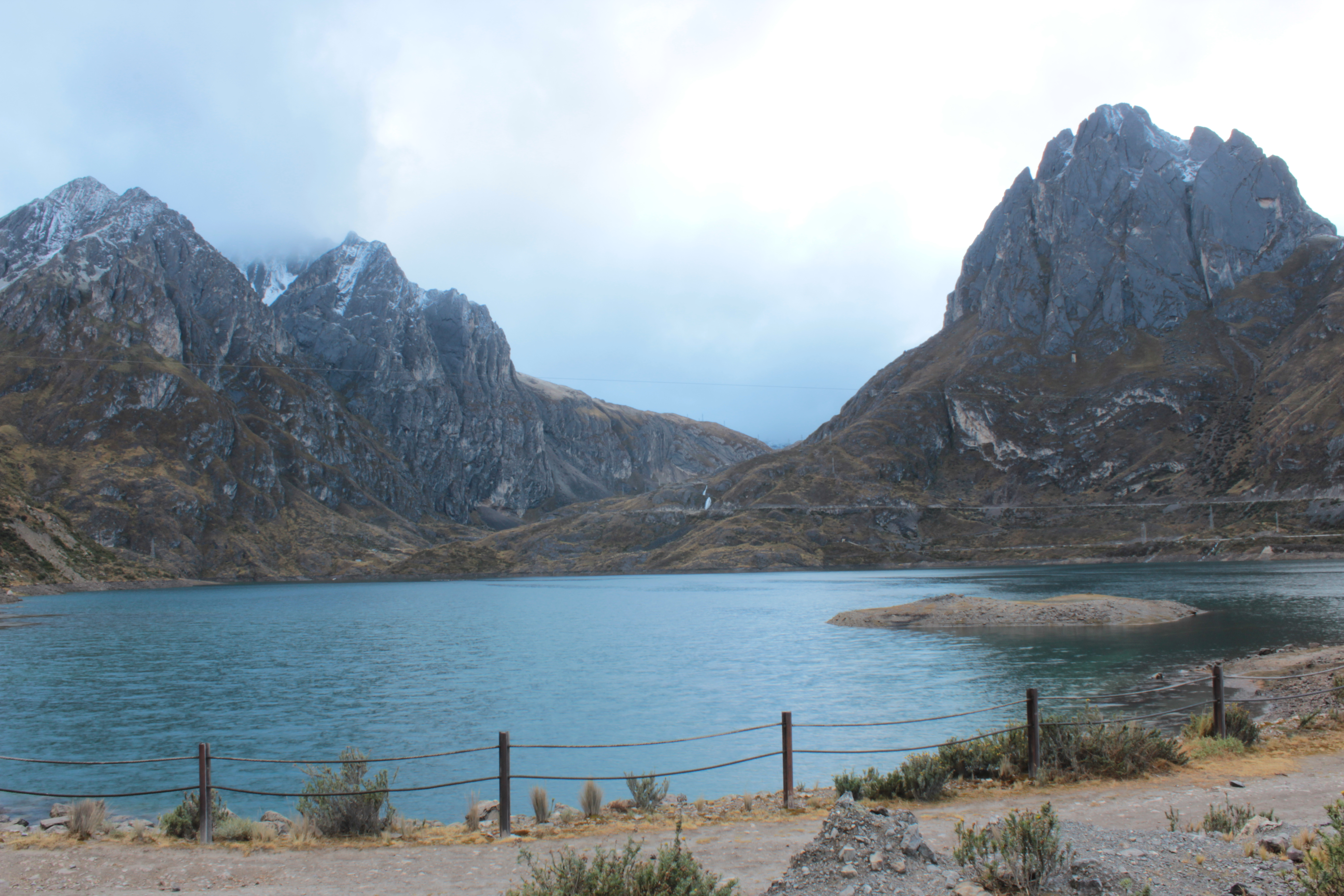
- Patun Lake, Oyón District
- Interactive map of Oyón
- Country: Peru
- Region: Lima
- Province: Oyón
- Capital: Oyón

Government
  - Mayor: Reynaldo Alcocer (2019-2022)

Area
  - Total: 887.61 km^{2} (342.71 sq mi)
- Elevation: 3,620 m (11,880 ft)

Population (2017)
  - Total: 12,150
  - Density: 13.69/km^{2} (35.45/sq mi)
- Time zone: UTC-5 (PET)
- UBIGEO: 150901

Oyón District is one of six districts of the province Oyón in Peru.

== Geography ==
The Rawra mountain range and the Rumi Cruz mountain range traverse the district. Some of the highest peaks of the district are listed below:

- Aququcha
- Awashqucha
- Awasqucha
- Awkin
- Challwaqucha
- Ch'uspi
- Hirka Kancha
- Isku
- Isqiraqucha
- Kinwa Ukru
- Kunkush
- Kuntursinqa
- Kurupata
- Kuntur Wayin
- Kushurupata
- Luliqucha
- Millpu
- Mishi Waqanan
- Miyu
- Muki
- Puka
- Pistaq
- Phiruru
- P'ukru
- Qawi
- Quyllur
- Q'illuqucha
- Ranrapata
- Shashima
- Tunshu
- Wanquyru
- Waqraqucha
- Waylla Hirka
- Wayllura
- Yana Kancha
- Yana Mach'ay
- Yana Paryan
- Yana P'itaq
- Yana Uqhu
- Yawarqucha
- Yaru Wayñu
- Yuraq Parya

== See also ==
- Chawpiqucha
