= Navan District =

Coordinates: 10°50′07″S 77°00′44″W

Navan
- District
- Interactive map of Navan
- Country: Peru
- Region: Lima
- Province: Oyón
- Founded: March 27, 1953
- Capital: Navan

Government
  - Mayor: Antenogenes Rosales Emeterio (2019-2022)

Area
  - Total: 227.16 km^{2} (87.71 sq mi)
- Elevation: 3,100 m (10,200 ft)

Population (2017)
  - Total: 855
  - Density: 3.76/km^{2} (9.75/sq mi)
- Time zone: UTC-5 (PET)
- UBIGEO: 150905

Navan District is one of six districts of the province Oyón in Peru.
