= Cochamarca District =

Coordinates: 10.8633°S 77.1291°W

Cochamarca Qucha Marka
- District
- Interactive map of Cochamarca
- Country: Peru
- Region: Lima
- Province: Oyón
- Founded: January 2, 1857
- Capital: Cochamarca

Government
  - Mayor: Fernando Carrera Gervacio

Area
  - Total: 265.55 km^{2} (102.53 sq mi)
- Elevation: 3,452 m (11,325 ft)

Population (2017)
  - Total: 1,086
  - Density: 4.090/km^{2} (10.59/sq mi)
- Time zone: UTC-5 (PET)
- UBIGEO: 150904

Cochamarca (from Quechua Qucha Marka or Quchamarka, meaning "lake village") is one of six districts of the Oyón Province in Peru.

== Geography ==
One of the highest peaks of the district is Punta Ch'uraq at approximately 5,000 m (16,000 ft). Other mountains are listed below:

- Chunta
- Ch'unchu Mach'ay
- Kunkush
- Kushuru Pukyu
- Khiki
- Pirwa Hirka
- Punta Wayi
- Qura Qaqa
- Q'ara Punta
- Wank'ayuq
- Warak'a
