= Muki (Oyón) =

Mountain in Peru

- Location within Peru

Highest point
- Elevation: 4,600 m (15,100 ft)
- Coordinates: 10°40′09″S 76°41′34″W

Geography
- Location: Peru, Lima Region
- Parent range: Andes

Muki (Quechua for asphyxia, also for a goblin who lives in caves, hispanicized spelling Muqui) is a mountain in the Andes of Peru, about 4,600 m (15,100 ft) high. It is located in the Lima Region, Oyón Province, Oyón District. Muki lies northwest of the mountain named Luliqucha.
