= Manas District, Peru =

Coordinates: 10.5954°S 77.1671°W

Manas District
- District
- Interactive map of Manas District
- Country: Peru
- Region: Lima
- Province: Cajatambo
- Founded: January 22, 1921
- Capital: Manas

Government
  - Mayor: Edson Saul Loli Arredondo (2019–2022)

Area
  - Total: 279.04 km^{2} (107.74 sq mi)
- Elevation: 2,398 m (7,867 ft)

Population (2017)
  - Total: 963
  - Density: 3.45/km^{2} (8.94/sq mi)
- Time zone: UTC-5 (PET)
- UBIGEO: 150305

Manas District is one of five districts of the province Cajatambo in Peru.
