= Pachangara District =

Coordinates: 10°48′45″S 76°52′28″W

Pachangara
- District
- Interactive map of Pachangara
- Country: Peru
- Region: Lima
- Province: Oyón
- Founded: January 28, 1863
- Capital: Churín

Government
  - Mayor: Toribio Fernández Villanueva (2019-2022)

Area
  - Total: 252.05 km^{2} (97.32 sq mi)
- Elevation: 2,265 m (7,431 ft)

Population (2017)
  - Total: 2,526
  - Density: 10.02/km^{2} (25.96/sq mi)
- Time zone: UTC-5 (PET)
- UBIGEO: 150906

Pachangara District is one of six districts of the province Oyón in Peru.
