= Pacllón District =

Coordinates: 10°18′00″S 77°07′01″W

Pacllón
- District
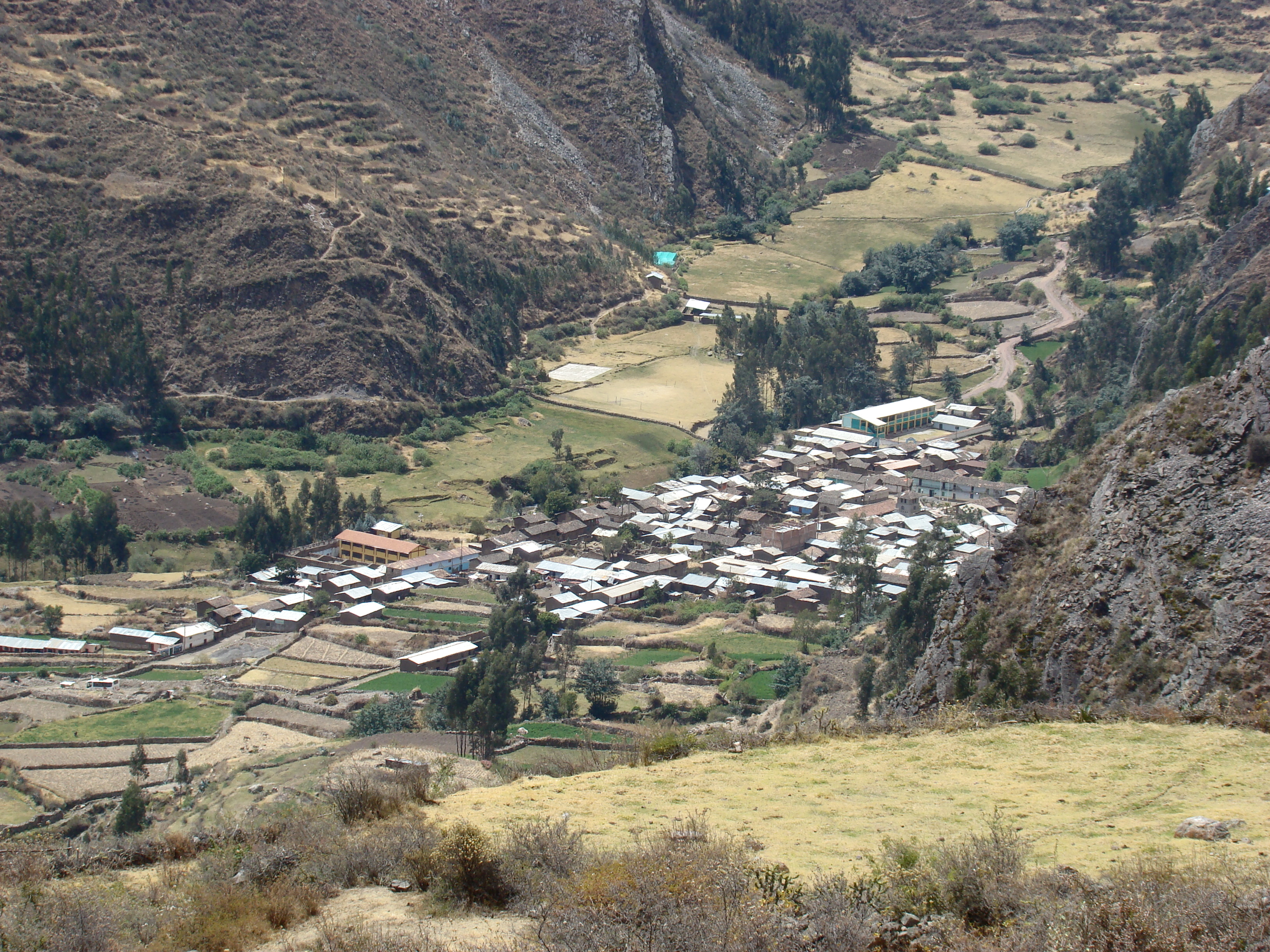
- The village of Llamaq in the Pacllón District
- Interactive map of Pacllón
- Country: Peru
- Region: Ancash
- Province: Bolognesi
- Founded: January 2, 1857
- Capital: Pacllón

Government
  - Mayor: Adhemir Carrera Padilla

Area
  - Total: 211.98 km^{2} (81.85 sq mi)
- Elevation: 3,292 m (10,801 ft)

Population (2005 census)
  - Total: 1,349
  - Density: 6.364/km^{2} (16.48/sq mi)
- Time zone: UTC-5 (PET)
- UBIGEO: 020513

Pacllón is a district of the province of Bolognesi, in the Ancash Region of Peru.

The town is within a day's walk from Chiquián. Many of the arrierros (donkey owners) that work in Waywash live here. Donkeys can be obtained here. The town is also home to stores with a regular selection of meals.

The hike from either the lake Hawaqucha or the Jashapampa valley takes a full day and offers views of the Waywash mountain range. There are places to camp on both sides of the town.

== Mountains ==
The Waywash range is the natural eastern and southeastern border of the district. The highest peak of the district is Yerupajá which is also the highest elevation of the range at6,635 m (21,768 ft). Other mountains of the district are listed below:

- Awkillu
- Intipa Ñawin
- Kasha
- Minapata
- Mit'urahu
- Ñitishqucha
- Parya
- Rahu Qulluta
- Runtuy
- Suyruqucha
- Wakrish

== See also ==
- Intipa Ñawin
