= P'ukru =

Mountain in Peru

- Location within Peru

Highest point
- Elevation: 5,050 m (16,570 ft)
- Coordinates: 10°36′49″S 76°51′51″W

Geography
- Location: Peru, Lima Region, Cajatambo Province, Oyón Province
- Parent range: Andes

P'ukru (Quechua for hole, pit, gap in a surface, hispanicized spelling Pucro, erroneously also spelled Pusro) is a mountain in the Andes of Peru, about 5,050 m (16,570 ft) high. It is located in the Lima Region, Cajatambo Province, Gorgor District, and in the Oyón Province, Oyón District.
