= Quyllur (Lima) =

Mountain in Peru

- Location within Peru

Highest point
- Elevation: 5,000 m (16,000 ft)
- Coordinates: 10°43′31″S 76°40′41″W

Geography
- Location: Peru, Lima Region
- Parent range: Andes

Quyllur (Quechua for star, hispanicized spelling Joyller) is a mountain in the Andes of Peru, about 5,000 m (16,000 ft) high. It is located in the Lima Region, Oyón Province, Oyón District. Quyllur lies southwest of the mountain named Luliqucha.
