= Cajatambo District =

Coordinates: 10.4713°S 76.9933°W

Cajatambo Qaqatampu
- District
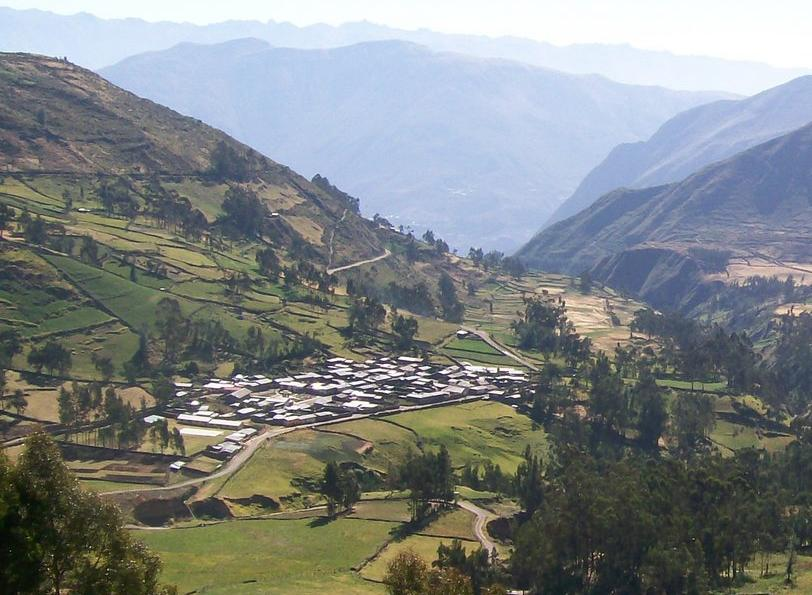
- The village of Astobamba, Cajatambo District
- Interactive map of Cajatambo
- Country: Peru
- Region: Lima
- Province: Cajatambo
- Capital: Cajatambo

Government
  - Mayor: José Del Carmen Flores Fuentes Rivera (2019-2022)

Area
  - Total: 567.96 km^{2} (219.29 sq mi)
- Elevation: 3,376 m (11,076 ft)

Population (2017)
  - Total: 2,082
  - Density: 3.666/km^{2} (9.494/sq mi)
- Time zone: UTC-5 (PET)
- UBIGEO: 150301

Cajatambo, Kashatampu, or Qaqatampu (Quechua) is one of five districts of the province Cajatambo in Peru.

== Geography ==
The Waywash mountain range traverses the district. Some of the highest peaks of the district are listed below:

- Awkin
- Challwaqucha
- Chhanka
- Ichik Qayqu
- Millpu
- Misapata
- Mishi Waqanan
- Mit'u Punta
- Muntiqucha
- Parya Ukru
- Pishtaq
- Puka Qaqa
- Puka Qaqa (Mun.)
- Puskan T'urpu
- Phuyuq
- Qullqan
- Suyruqucha
- Shawanaqucha
- Waqshash
- Waylla Hirka
- Waylla Hirka (Caj.)
- Yana Kushman
- Yana Hirka
- Yana Paryan
- Yana Uqsha
- Yuraq Hirka
- Yuraq Qaqa

== See also ==
- Quyllurqucha
