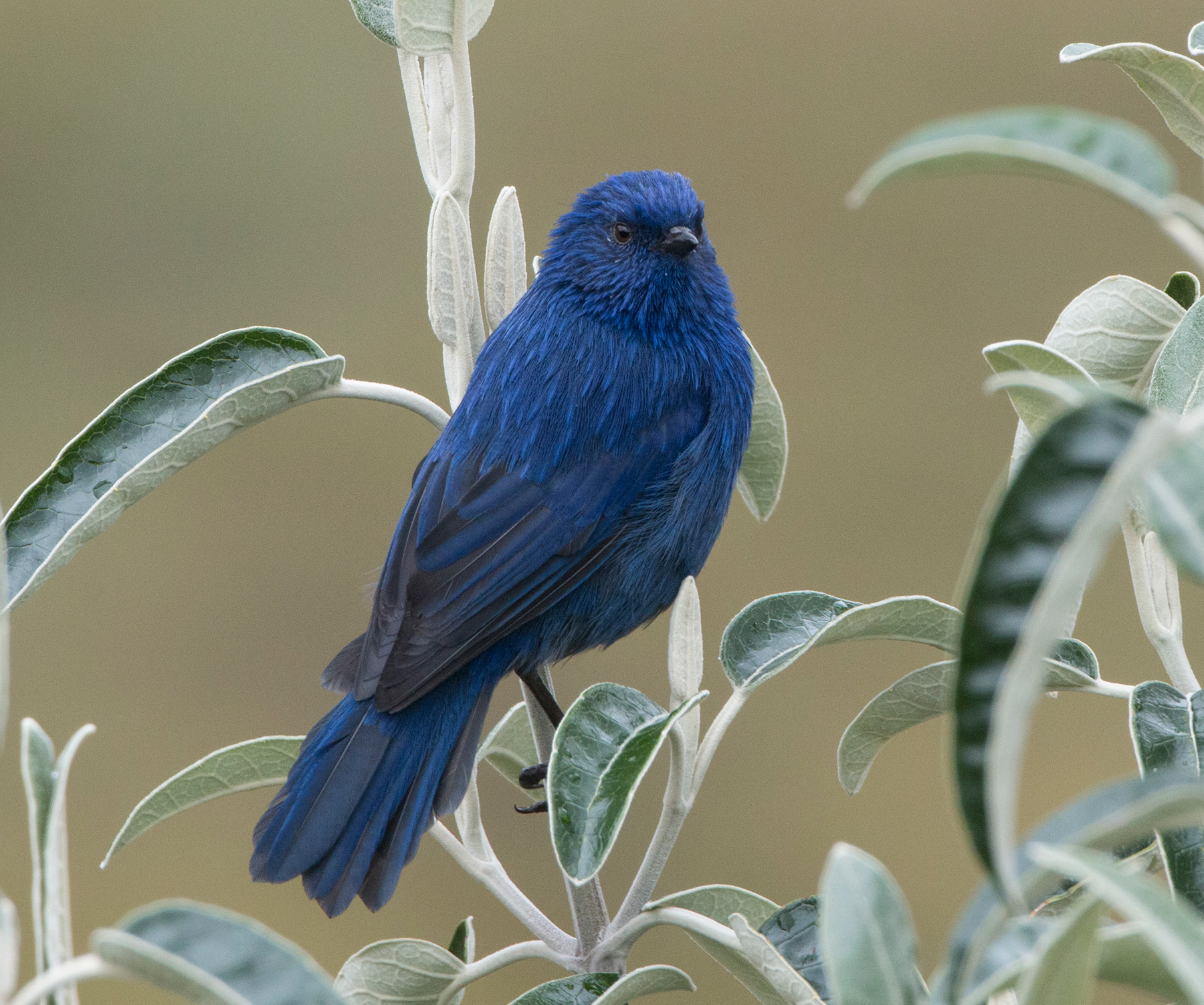
- Streaked dacnis (Xenodacnis petersi)

Scientific classification
- Kingdom: Animalia
- Phylum: Chordata
- Class: Aves
- Order: Passeriformes
- Family: Thraupidae
- Genus: Xenodacnis; Cabanis, 1873

Species
- See text

= Xenodacnis =

Genus of birds

Xenodacnis is a genus of warbler-like tanagers. They are found in highland forest in South America.

The two species placed in the genus are:

Image	Scientific name	Common name	Distribution
	Xenodacnis petersi	Streaked dacnis	southwestern Ecuador and Peru
	Xenodacnis parina	Tit-like dacnis	Peru.
