= Kinwa Ukru =

Mountain in Peru

- Location within Peru

Highest point
- Elevation: 5,006 m (16,424 ft)
- Coordinates: 10°46′03″S 76°42′17″W

Geography
- Location: Peru, Lima Region
- Parent range: Andes

Kinwa Ukru (Quechua kinwa Chenopodium quinoa, ukru hole, pit, hollow, "quinoa hole", Hispanicized spelling Quenhuaucro) is a 5,006-metre-high (16,424 ft) mountain in the Andes of Peru. It is located in the Lima Region, Oyón Province, Oyón District. Kinwa Ukru lies west of a mountain named Aququcha.
