= Cajatambo =

- Town
- Location within Peru
- Coordinates: 10°29′S 77°02′W
- Country: Peru
- Region: Lima
- Province: Cajatambo
- District: Cajatambo

Government
  - Mayor: José Del Carmen Flores Fuentes Rivera
- Elevation: 3,350 m (10,990 ft)

Population (2017)
  - Total: 2,082
- Time zone: UTC-5 (PET)

Cajatambo or Kashatampu is the capital of the Cajatambo Province in the Lima Region of Peru.

== History ==
Founded during the Tawantinsuyu (Inca Empire) before the advent of the Spanish conquistadors, with the name of Kasha Tanpu, it was one of the stops along the Inca highway, being part of the imperial region of Chinchay Suyu.

== Demography ==
The population of Cajatambo was estimated in 1896 to be roughly 6,000 people, although roughly 15 years later the Encyclopædia Britannica Eleventh Edition put the population at closer to 4,500.

In recent decades many people have migrated to places with better opportunities and services, such as the city of Lima.

Spanish is the language which the majority of the population (80%) learnt to speak in childhood, followed by Quechua (19%). The variety of Quechua spoken in the area is the Cajatambo Quechua (part of the Central Quechua "Wankay"), a Quechua I dialect which shares 74% intelligibility with the neighboring Huamalies Quechua.

== Toponymy ==
The toponym Cajatambo comes from the Quechua words: kasha ("thorn", "cold") and tanpu ("inn").

== Geography ==
Geographically, Cajatambo is located in the Quechua region bordering the Suni region, its climate is dry and moderately cold with the sun's rays being temperate, however the temperature drops considerably at night.

=== Climate ===
Climate data for Cajatambo (1991–2020)
Month	Jan	Feb	Mar	Apr	May	Jun	Jul	Aug	Sep	Oct	Nov	Dec	Year
Mean daily maximum °C (°F)	15.3 (59.5)	15.0 (59.0)	15.1 (59.2)	16.1 (61.0)	16.6 (61.9)	16.6 (61.9)	16.7 (62.1)	17.4 (63.3)	17.5 (63.5)	16.8 (62.2)	16.3 (61.3)	15.4 (59.7)	16.2 (61.2)
Mean daily minimum °C (°F)	6.1 (43.0)	6.2 (43.2)	6.2 (43.2)	5.8 (42.4)	5.2 (41.4)	4.7 (40.5)	4.3 (39.7)	4.7 (40.5)	5.5 (41.9)	5.8 (42.4)	5.6 (42.1)	6.2 (43.2)	5.5 (41.9)
Average precipitation mm (inches)	103.0 (4.06)	125.3 (4.93)	133.2 (5.24)	52.6 (2.07)	9.9 (0.39)	1.4 (0.06)	0.4 (0.02)	1.4 (0.06)	9.7 (0.38)	33.2 (1.31)	46.3 (1.82)	102.5 (4.04)	618.9 (24.37)
Source: NOAA

== Economy ==
Near the city there are silver mines, which used to employ a section of the population. In 2002, the Peruvian government declared regions of the mountains upon which Cajatambo is located to be protected, and future mining was prohibited.

Cajatambo's main industries are now agricultural and pastoral. It is known for its cheeses, butter, manjar blanco and chicharrón.

== Tourism ==
Tourist attractions near the town include the Astobamba's prairie and its peaks, the Baths of Shucsha, and the Waywash range.

Inca trails are still preserved and used as bridle paths by the locals.

The fauna of Cajatambo includes wild species: andean foxes, vicuñas, vizcachas, andean condors, eagles, falcons, among others. In the same town falcons can be seen.
