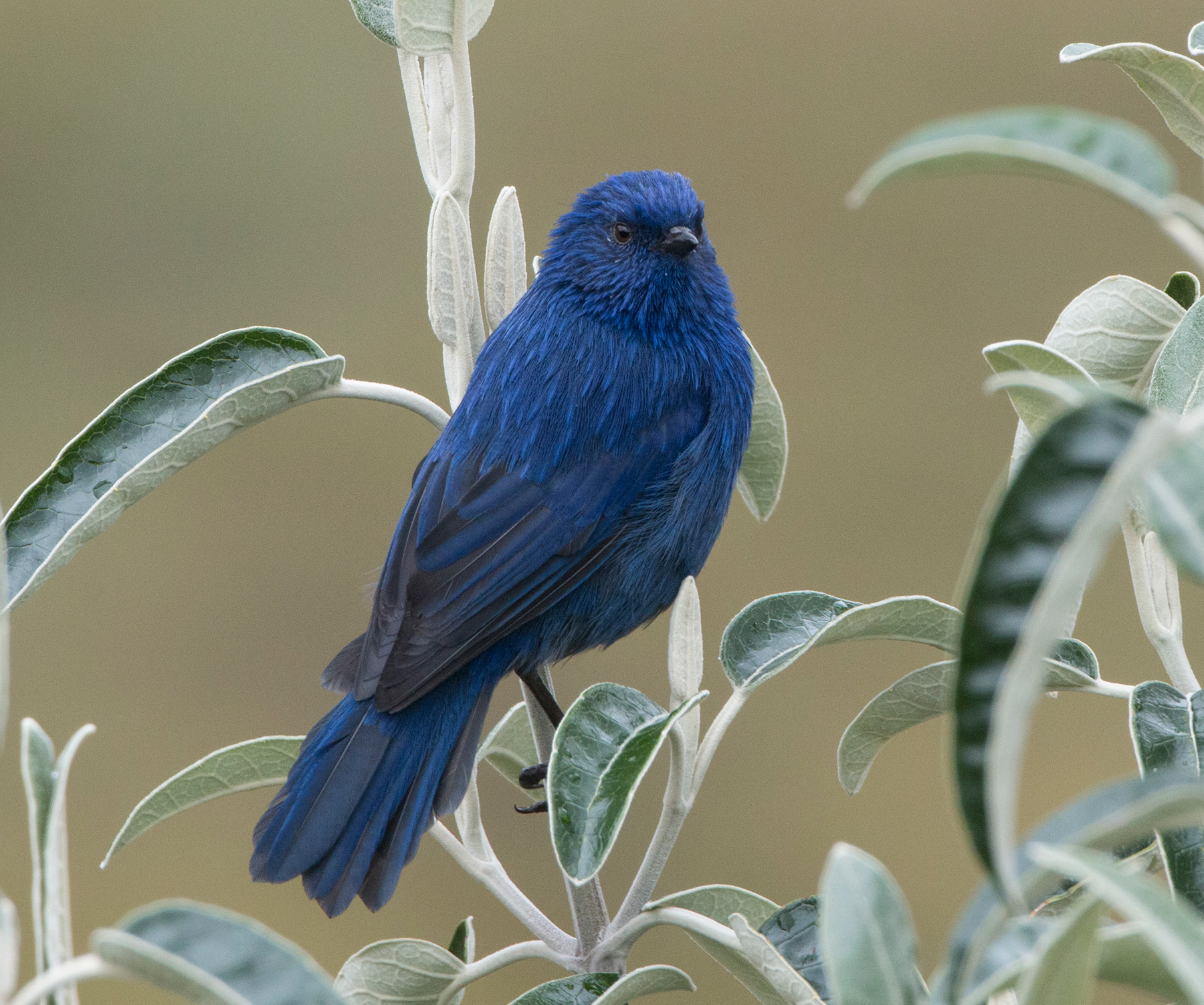

Conservation status
- Least Concern (IUCN 3.1)

Scientific classification
- Kingdom: Animalia
- Phylum: Chordata
- Class: Aves
- Order: Passeriformes
- Family: Thraupidae
- Genus: Xenodacnis
- Species: X. petersi

Binomial name
- Xenodacnis petersi Bond, J & Meyer de Schauensee, 1939

= Streaked dacnis =

Species of bird

The streaked dacnis (Xenodacnis petersi) is a small neotropical passerine bird found in Peru. It is found in Andean montane scrub forests from 3000 m to 4600 m elevation.

Two subspecies are recognised:

- X. p. bella Bond & Meyer de Schauensee, 1939 – southwest Ecuador and north Peru
- X. p. petersi Bond & Meyer de Schauensee, 1939 – central Peru
