= Chhanka =

Mountain in Peru

- Location within Peru

Highest point
- Elevation: 5,050 m (16,570 ft)
- Coordinates: 10°32′40″S 76°52′50″W

Geography
- Location: Peru, Lima Region, Cajatambo Province
- Parent range: Andes

Chhanka (Quechua for cliff, hispanicized spelling Chanca) is a mountain in the Andes of Peru, about 5,050 m (16,570 ft) high. It is located in the Lima Region, Cajatambo Province, Cajatambo District. Chhanka lies southwest of Pishtaq. A little lake named Tuqtuqucha ("hen lake") lies at its feet.
