= Andajes District =

Coordinates: 10.7926°S 76.9089°W

Andajes
- District
- Interactive map of Andajes
- Country: Peru
- Region: Lima
- Province: Oyón
- Founded: January 2, 1857
- Capital: Andajes

Government
  - Mayor: Otmar Conejo Chavarría (2019-2022)

Area
  - Total: 148.18 km^{2} (57.21 sq mi)
- Elevation: 3,487 m (11,440 ft)

Population (2017)
  - Total: 546
  - Density: 3.68/km^{2} (9.54/sq mi)
- Time zone: UTC-5 (PET)
- UBIGEO: 150902
- Website: https://web.archive.org/web/20100523150846/http://www.muniandajes.gob.pe/

Andajes District is one of six districts of the province Oyón in Peru.

It is located in the northern highlands of the department of Lima Province Oyón 23 km to the NW of the town of Churín at an altitud of 3,487 meters.

Andajes historic village the land of "Martyrs of Democracy" cradle of delicacies called by the investigator Antonio Raimondi "Balcony of the Andes". It was created politically January 2, 1857, by General Ramón Castilla. Currently there are annexes: La Chimba and San Benito.

Etymologically the term Andajes place names comer from two Quechua. "Anta" means copper and "Jaja" or "casha" which means thorn. Another version is that it was named by Spanish Andaxes and eventually led to Andajes.
