= Huayllajirca =

Mountain in Peru

- Location within Peru

Highest point
- Elevation: 5,000 m (16,000 ft)
- Coordinates: 10°31′59″S 76°51′25″W

Geography
- Location: Peru, Lima Region, Cajatambo Province, Oyón Province
- Parent range: Andes

Huayllajirca (possibly from Quechua waylla meadow, Ancash Quechua hirka mountain, "meadow mountain") is a mountain in the Andes of Peru, about 5,000 m (16,000 ft) high. It is located in the Lima Region, Cajatambo Province, Cajatambo District, and in the Oyón Province, Oyón District. Huayllajirca lies northwest of the mountain named Chalhuacocha and northeast of Pishtac and Tocto lake.
