= Condor Huayin (mountain) =

Mountain in Peru

- Location within Peru

Highest point
- Elevation: 5,000 m (16,000 ft)
- Coordinates: 10°33′10″S 76°49′51″W

Geography
- Location: Peru, Lima Region, Oyon Province
- Parent range: Andes

Condor Huayin (possibly from Quechua kuntur condor, Ancash Quechua wayi house, "condor house", -n a suffix) is a mountain in the Andes of Peru, about 5,000 metres (16,404 ft) high. It is situated in the Lima Region, Oyon Province, Oyon District. Condor Huayin lies on a ridge which extends from north to south southeast of the Huayhuash mountain range and southwest of the Raura mountain range. The peak south of Condor Huayin at the very end of the ridge is named Shapra (local Quechua for "beard").
