= Puka Qaqa =

Mountain in Peru

- Location within Peru

Highest point
- Elevation: 5,000 m (16,000 ft)
- Coordinates: 10°26′5″S 76°51′22″W

Geography
- Location: Peru, Lima Region, Cajatambo Province
- Parent range: Andes

Puka Qaqa (Quechua puka red, qaqa rock, "red rock", Hispanicized spelling Pucaccacca) is a mountain in the Andes of Peru, about 5,000 metres (16,404 ft) high. It is located in the Lima Region, Cajatambo Province, Cajatambo District. Puka Qaqa lies in the Pumarinri valley south of the Waywash mountain range and north of Millpu. The lakes named Quyllurqucha, Warmiqucha (Quechua for "woman lake", Huarmicocha) and Challwaqucha ("fish lake", Challhuacocha) lie at its feet.

== See also ==
- Millpu
- Pumarinri
