= Millpu (Cajatambo) =

Mountain in Peru

- Location within Peru

Highest point
- Elevation: 5,300 m (17,400 ft)
- Coordinates: 10°27′46″S 76°51′13″W

Geography
- Location: Peru, Lima Region, Cajatambo Province, Oyon Province
- Parent range: Andes

Millpu (Quechua for "throat, gullet", also spelled Millpo) is a mountain in the Andes of Peru, about 5,300 metres (17,388 ft) high. It is situated south of the Huayhuash mountain range. Its main peak and the northern peak are located in the Lima Region, Cajatambo Province, Cajatambo District, south of Puka Qaqa and a lake named Quyllurqucha. The southern peak of Millpu lies at 10°29′5″S 76°51′9″W on the border with the Oyon Province, Oyon District.

== See also ==
- Pumarinri
