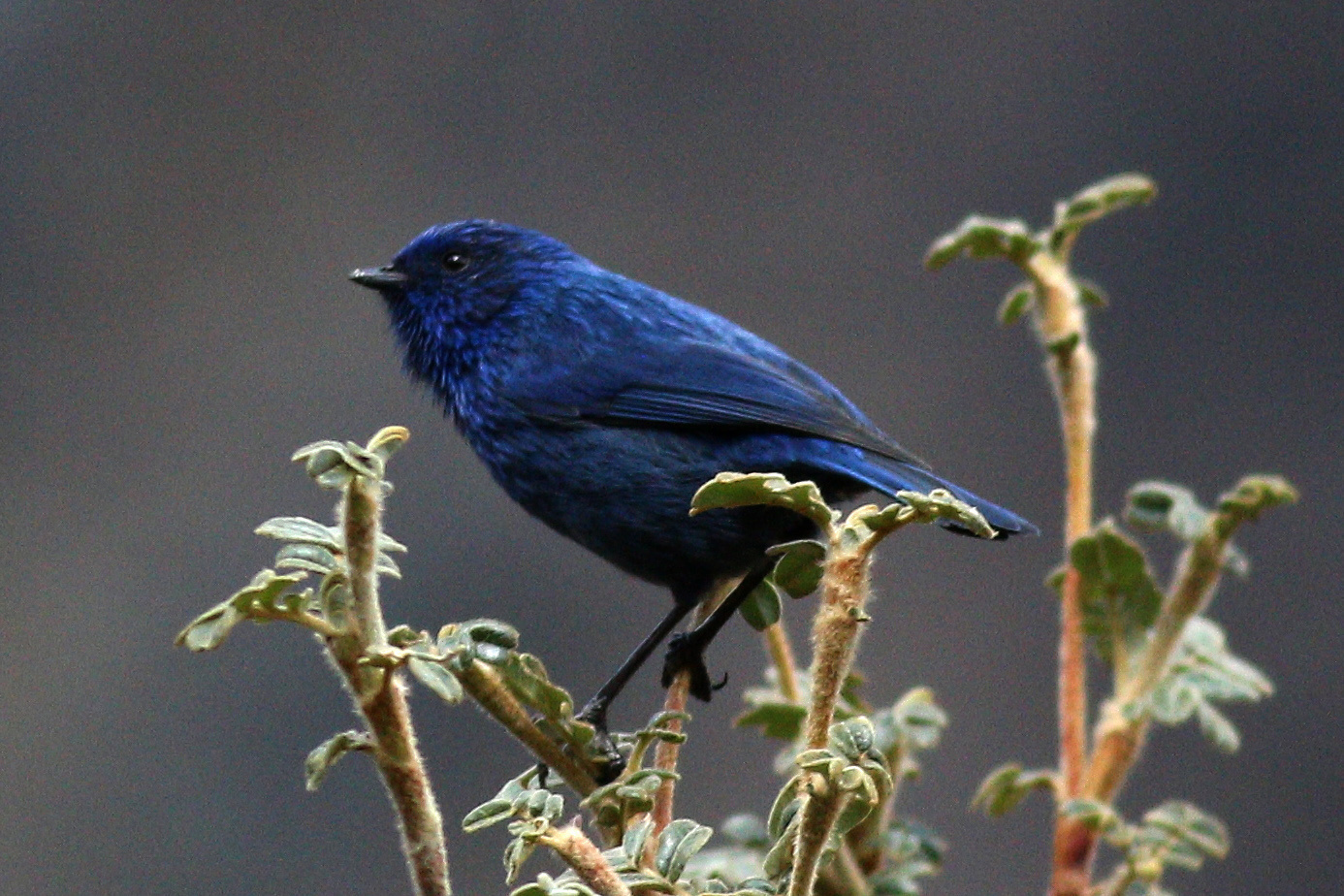
- Male
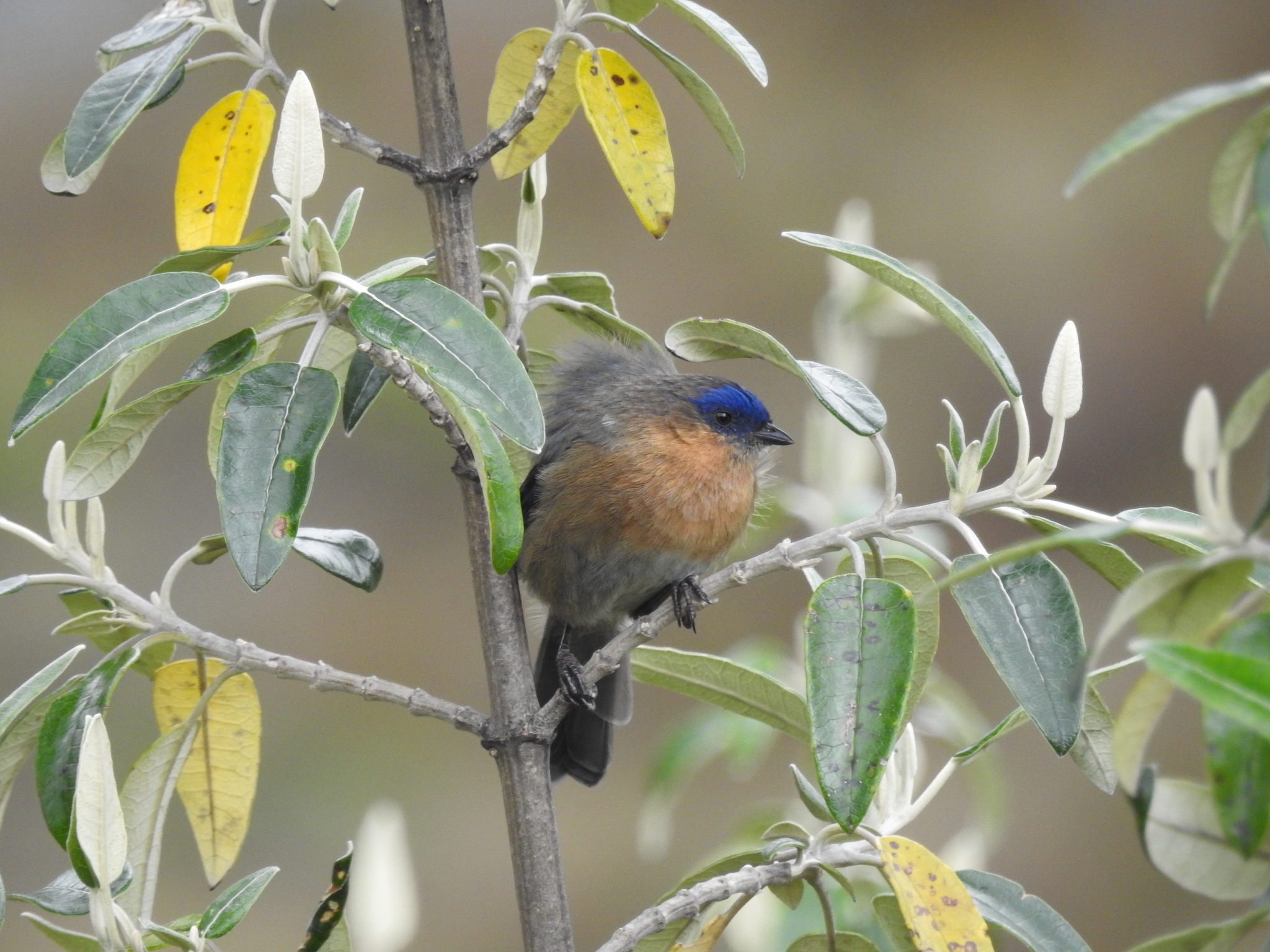
- Female

Conservation status
- Least Concern (IUCN 3.1)

Scientific classification
- Kingdom: Animalia
- Phylum: Chordata
- Class: Aves
- Order: Passeriformes
- Family: Thraupidae
- Genus: Xenodacnis
- Species: X. parina

Binomial name
- Xenodacnis parina Cabanis, 1873

= Tit-like dacnis =

Species of bird

The tit-like dacnis (Xenodacnis parina) is a small neotropical passerine bird found in southern Ecuador and Peru. In Spanish, it is known as Azulito Altoandino. It is found in Andean montane scrub forests from 3000 m to 4600 m elevation.

Adults reach 12.5 cm in length. Males are solid deep blue with dark eyes, bill, and feet. Females of all subspecies are duller, with rufous-brown underparts.

== Taxonomy ==
The tit-like dacnis was formally described in 1873 by the German ornithologist Jean Cabanis from a specimen collected in the Andes of central Peru. Cabanis introduced the genus Xenodacnis and coined the binomial name Xenodacnis parina. The genus name combines the Ancient Greek xenos meaning "different" or "unusual" with the genus name Dacnis. The specific epithet parina is from Modern Latin and means "tit like". The tit-like dacnis is sister to a clade containing the four species now placed in the genus Idiopsar.
