= Lake Chaupicocha (Lima) =

Lake in Peru

- Location within Peru
- Location: Peru; Lima Region
- Coordinates: 10°48′30″S 76°39′8″W

Lake Chaupicocha (possibly from Quechua chawpi central, middle, qucha lake) is a lake in Peru located in the Lima Region, Oyón Province, Oyón District. It lies north of the mountain Garguac.
