= Mitopunta =

Mountain in Peru

- Location within Peru

Highest point
- Elevation: 5,571 m (18,278 ft)
- Coordinates: 10°25′02″S 76°56′04″W

Geography
- Location: Peru, Lima Region, Cajatambo Province
- Parent range: Andes, Huayhuash

Mitopunta (possibly from Quechua mit'u, mitu mud, punta peak; ridge; first, before, in front of) is a 5,571-metre-high (18,278 ft) mountain in the Huayhuash mountain range in the Andes of Peru. It is located in the Lima Region, Cajatambo Province, Cajatambo District. Mitopunta lies on a sub-range west of the main range east of Huacshash. It is situated north of the Pumarinri valley.
