= Chalhuacocha (Cajatambo-Oyón) =

Mountain in Peru

- Location within Peru

Highest point
- Elevation: 5,200 m (17,100 ft)
- Coordinates: 10°32′51″S 76°51′19″W

Geography
- Location: Peru, Lima Region, Cajatambo Province, Oyón Province
- Parent range: Andes

Chalhuacocha (possibly from Quechua challwa fish, qucha lake, "fish lake") is a mountain in the Andes of Peru, about 5,200 metres (17,060 ft) high. It is located in the Lima Region, Cajatambo Province, Cajatambo District, and in the Oyón Province, Oyón District. Chalhuacocha lies northwest of Condor Huayin and east of Tocto lake.
