= Kunkush (Lima) =

Mountain in Peru

- Location within Peru

Highest point
- Elevation: 4,800 m (15,700 ft)
- Coordinates: 10°38′56″S 76°43′17″W

Geography
- Location: Peru, Lima Region
- Parent range: Andes

Kunkush (Ancash Quechua for Puya raimondii, hispanicized spelling Cuncush) is a mountain in the Andes of Peru, about 4,800 m (15,700 ft) high. It is located in the Lima Region, Oyón Province, Oyón District.
