= Yana Uqhu (Oyón) =

Mountain in Peru

- Location within Peru

Highest point
- Elevation: 5,000 m (16,000 ft)
- Coordinates: 10°36′24″S 76°43′35″W

Geography
- Location: Peru, Lima Region, Oyón Province
- Parent range: Andes

Yana Uqhu (Quechua yana black, uqhu swamp, "black swamp", Hispanicized spelling Yanaogo) is a mountain in the Andes of Peru, about 5,000 metres (16,404 ft) high. It is located in the Lima Region, Oyón Province, Oyón District.
