= Oyón, Peru =

Oyón
- Town
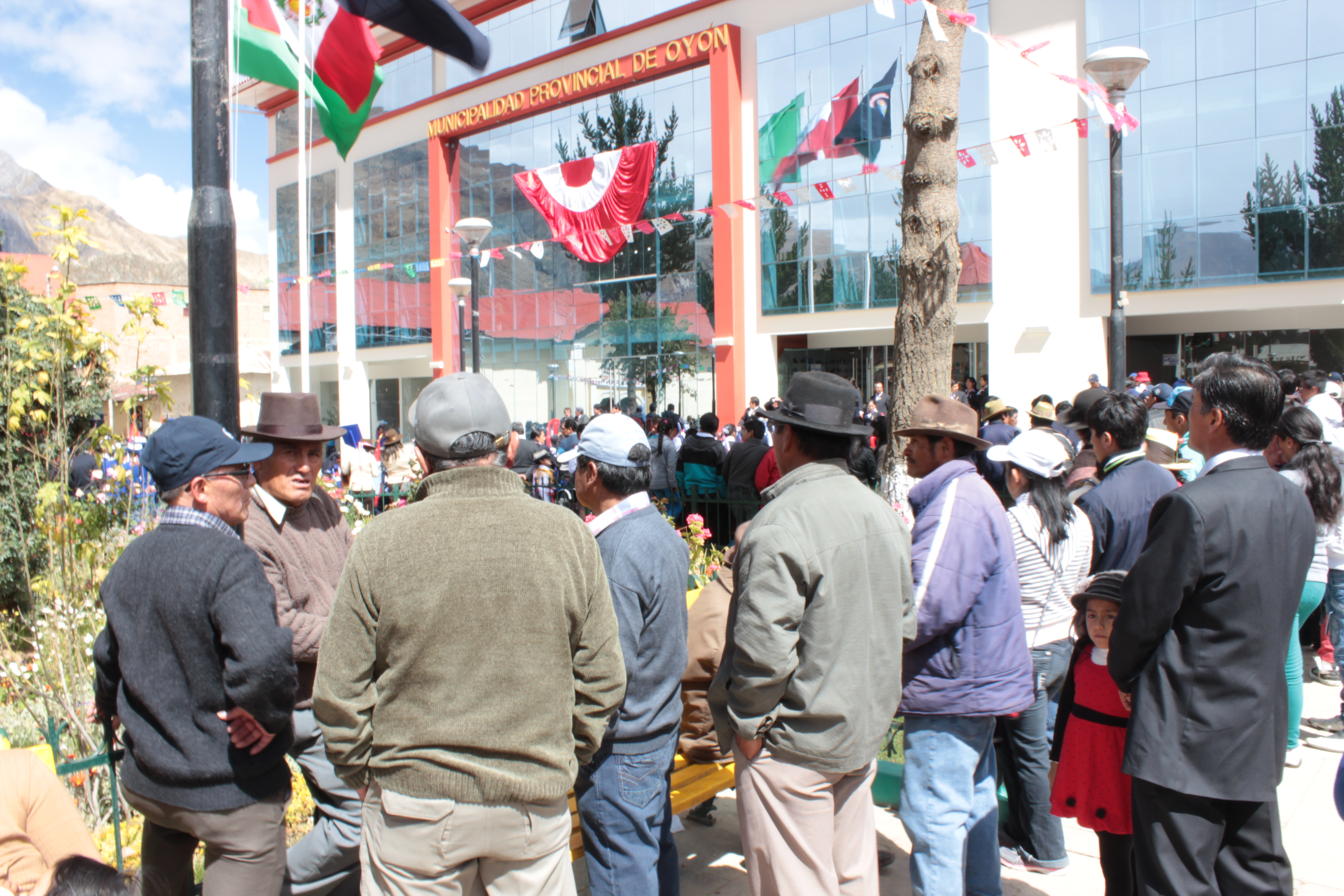

- Location within Peru
- Coordinates: 10°40′9″S 76°46′22″W
- Country: Peru
- Region: Lima
- Province: Oyón
- District: Oyón

Government
  - Mayor: Reynaldo Alcoser Medina (2019-2022)
- Elevation: 3,620 m (11,880 ft)

Population (2017)
  - Total: 12,150
- Time zone: UTC-5 (PET)

Oyón is a town in Central Peru, capital of the province Oyón in the Department of Lima.
