= Pumarinri (Lima) =

Mountain in Peru

- Location within Peru

Highest point
- Elevation: 5,465 m (17,930 ft)
- Coordinates: 10°23′50″S 76°53′01″W

Naming
- English translation: puma ear
- Language of name: Quechua

Geography
- Location: Peru, Lima Region
- Parent range: Andes, Huayhuash

Pumarinri (possibly from Quechua puma cougar, puma, rinri ear, "puma ear") is a 5,465-metre-high (17,930 ft) mountain in the south of the Huayhuash mountain range in the Andes of Peru. It is located in the Lima Region, Cajatambo Province, Cajatambo District. Pumarinri lies at the Pumarinri valley, south of Cuyoc.

== See also ==
- Puka Qaqa
