= Lake Niñacocha =

Lake in Peru

- Location within Peru
- Location: Peru; Huánuco Region
- Coordinates: 10°13′01″S 76°53′48″W

Lake Niñacocha (possibly from Quechua nina fire qucha lake) is a lake in Peru located in the Huánuco Region, Lauricocha Province, Queropalca District. Lake Niñacocha is situated in the north of the Huayhuash mountain range, east of Ninashanca and Rondoy and southwest of Mitococha ("mud lake").
