= Pishtac (Lima) =

Mountain in Peru

- Location within Peru

Highest point
- Elevation: 5,095 m (16,716 ft)
- Coordinates: 10°32′29″S 76°52′25″W

Geography
- Location: Peru, Lima Region, Cajatambo Province
- Parent range: Andes

Pishtac (possibly from Ancash Quechua for slaughterer, is a 5,095-metre-high (16,716 ft) mountain in the Andes of Peru. It is located in the Lima Region, Cajatambo Province, Cajatambo District. Pishtac is southwest of Huayllajirca and northwest of a mountain called Chalhuacocha. A little lake named Tocto lies at its feet.
