= Luliqucha =

Mountain in Peru

- Location within Peru

Highest point
- Elevation: 5,200 m (17,100 ft)
- Coordinates: 10°40′45″S 76°40′16″W

Geography
- Location: Peru, Lima Region, Pasco Region
- Parent range: Andes

Luliqucha (local Quechua luli interior (ruri), qucha lake, "interior lake", hispanicized spelling Lulicocha) is a mountain in the Andes of Peru, about 5,200 m (17,100 ft) high, at a small lake of that name. It is located in the Lima Region, Oyón Province, Oyón District, and in the Pasco Region, Pasco Province, Simón Bolívar District. The ridge of Luliqucha stretches along the border between the Lima Region and the Pasco Region, west of Pumaqucha.

The lake named Luliqucha lies east of the ridge at 10°40′36″S 76°39′40″W.
