= Rondoy =

Mountain in Peru

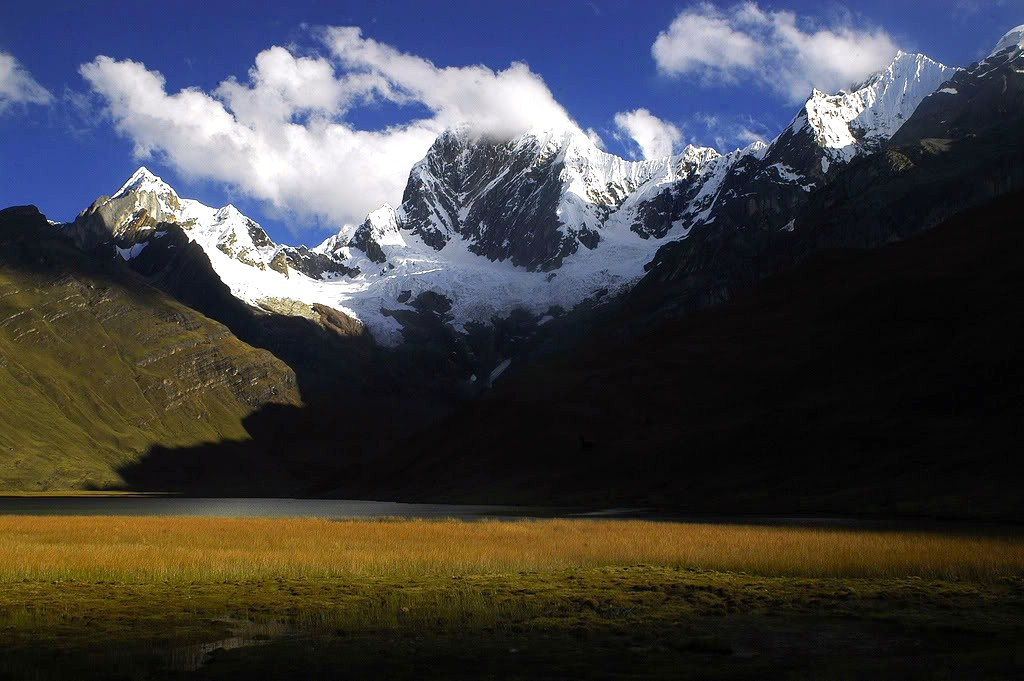
- Jirishanca and Rondoy

Highest point
- Elevation: 5,870 m (19,260 ft)
- Coordinates: 10°13′30.0″S 76°54′58.0″W

Geography
- Location within Peru
- Location: Ancash Region, Huánuco Region
- Parent range: Andes, Huayhuash

Rondoy (possibly from Quechua runtuy: "to hail" or "to lay an egg") is a 5,870-metre-high (19,259 ft) mountain in the north of the Huayhuash mountain range in the Andes of Peru. It is located in the Ancash Region, Bolognesi Province, Pacllón District, and in the Huánuco Region, Lauricocha Province, Queropalca District. Rondoy lies north of Yerupajá and Jirishanca and southwest of Lake Mitococha.

== See also ==
- Lake Niñacocha
- Lake Carhuacocha
- Rasac
