= Cuyoc (mountain) =

Mountain in Peru

- Location within Peru

Highest point
- Elevation: 5,550 m (18,210 ft)
- Listing: List of mountains in Peru
- Coordinates: 10°23′09″S 76°52′31″W

Naming
- Language of name: Quechua

Geography
- Location: Peru, Lima Region
- Parent range: Andes, Huayhuash

Cuyoc (possibly from Quechua kuyuy to move, "the one that moves"), also known as: Puyoc (possibly from Quechua phuyu cloud, -q a suffix, "the cloudy one"), is a mountain in the south of the Huayhuash mountain range in the Andes of Peru, about 5,550 metres (18,209 ft) high. It is located in the Lima Region, Cajatambo Province, Cajatambo District. Cuyoc lies north of Pumarinri.
