= Lake Carhuacocha (Jesús-Queropalca) =

Lake in Peru

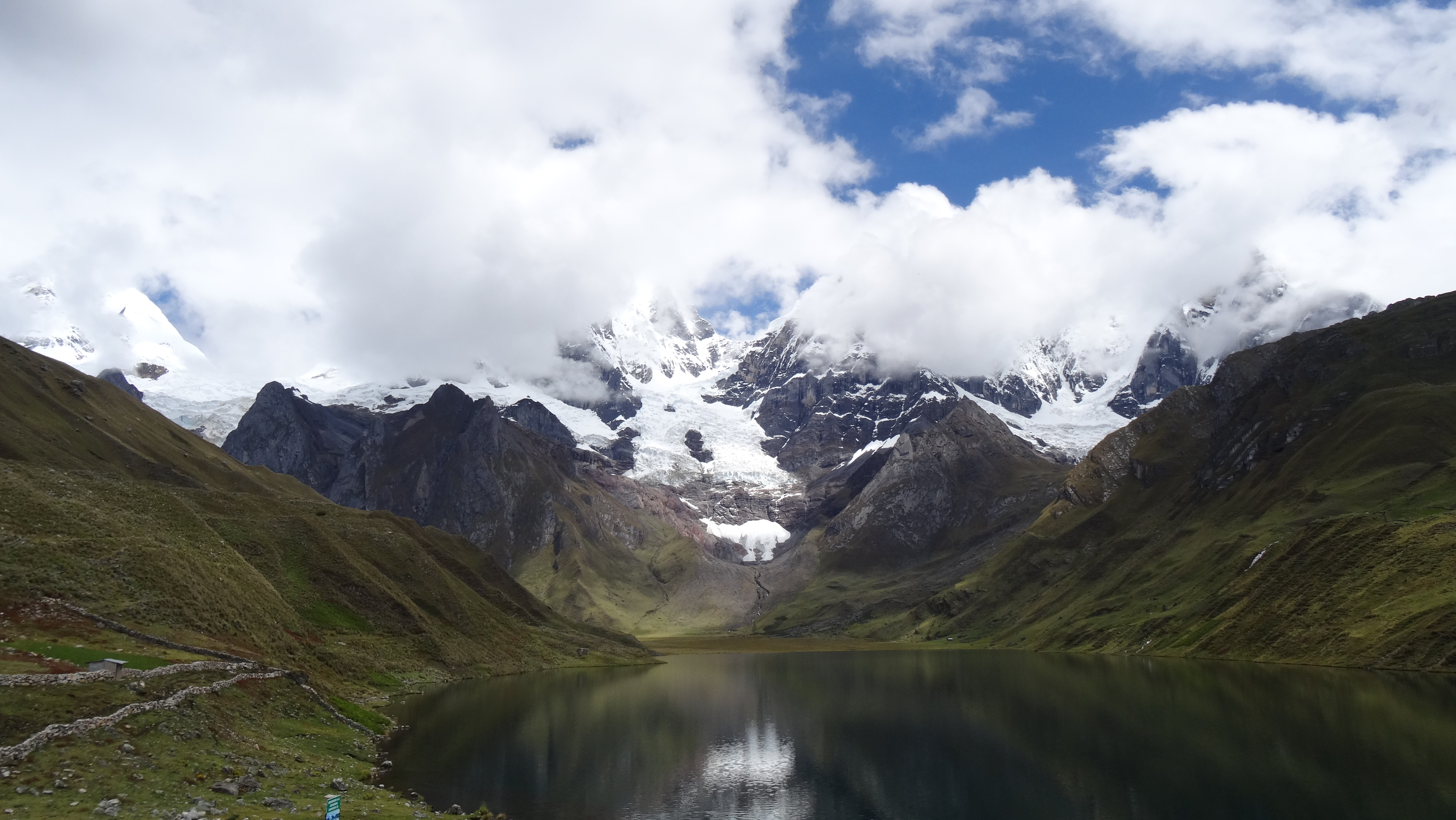
- The northeastern side of the Huayhuash range as seen from Lake Carhuacocha

- Location within Peru
- Location: Huanuco Region
- Coordinates: 10°14′39″S 76°51′56″W
- Basin countries: Peru
- Max. length: 1.5 km (0.93 mi)
- Max. width: 0.44 km (0.27 mi)
- Surface elevation: 4,150 m (13,620 ft)

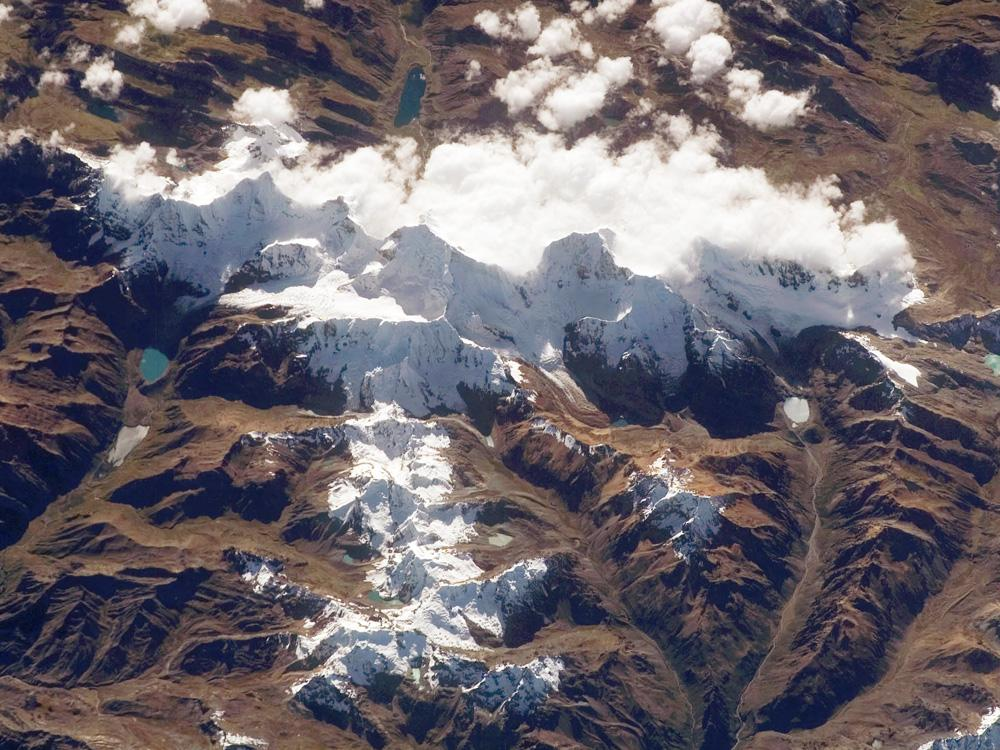
Carhuacocha (on the top in the center) in the east of the Huayhuash mountain range as seen from the air (NASA image)

Lake Carhuacocha (possibly from Quechua qarwa leaf worm, larva of a beetle; pale, yellowish, golden, qucha lake,) is a lake in Peru located in the Huanuco Region, Lauricocha Province, on the border of the districts of Jesús and Queropalca. It lies on the east side of the Huayhuash mountain range. The lake is about 1.5 km long and 0.44 km at its widest point.

== See also ==
- List of lakes in Peru
