= Lake Mitococha =

Lake in Peru

- Camp nearby Lake Mitococha

- Location within Peru
- Location: Huanuco Region
- Coordinates: 10°11′54″S 76°53′42″W
- Basin countries: Peru
- Max. length: 0.83 km (0.52 mi)
- Max. width: 0.3 km (0.19 mi)
- Surface elevation: 4,270 m (14,010 ft)

Lake Mitococha or Mitucocha (possibly from Quechua mit'u, mitu mud, qucha lake, "mud lake") is a lake in Peru located in Huanuco Region, Lauricocha Province, Queropalca District. It has an elevation of 4,270 metres (14,009 ft) above sea level. It lies on the east side of the Huayhuash mountain range, northeast of Mituraju and Rondoy. Lake Mitococha is 0.83 km long and 0.3 km at its widest point.

== See also ==
- Ninacocha
- List of lakes in Peru
