= Oyón province =

Province of Peru

Coordinates: 10°40′05″S 76°46′21″W

Oyón
- Province
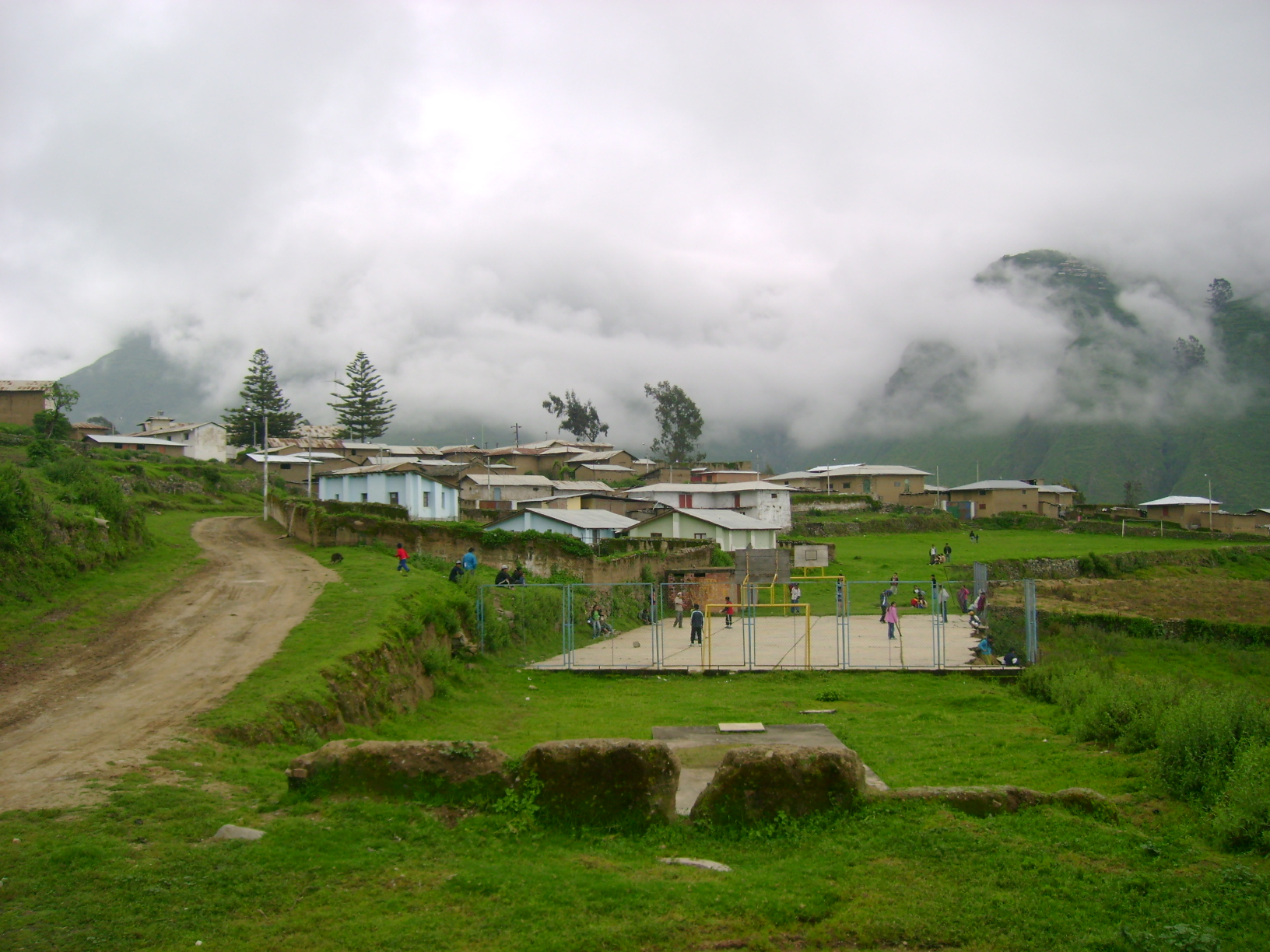
- Village of Caujul

- Location of Oyón in Lima
- Country: Peru
- Department: Lima
- Capital: Oyón

Government
  - Mayor: Reynaldo Alcoser (2019-2022)

Area
  - Total: 1,886.05 km^{2} (728.21 sq mi)
- Elevation: 3,620 m (11,880 ft)

Population
  - Total: 17,739
  - Density: 9.4054/km^{2} (24.360/sq mi)
- UBIGEO: 1509
- Website: www.munioyon.gob.pe

Oyón is a province of the department of Lima, Peru. From the administrative point of view of the Catholic Church in Peru, it forms part of the Diocese of Huacho. It measures 1,886 square kilometres (728 sq mi). The capital of the province is the city of Oyón.

== Geography ==
The Rawra mountain range and the Rumi Cruz mountain range traverse the province. Some of the highest peaks of the province are listed below:

- Aququcha
- Awashqucha
- Awasqucha
- Awkin
- Challwaqucha
- Chanka Qaqa
- Chawpiqucha
- Ch'uspi
- Hirka Kancha
- Isku
- Isqiraqucha
- Kinwa Ukru
- Kunkush
- Kuntursinqa
- Kuntur Wayin
- Kurupata
- Kushurupata
- Luliqucha
- Mataqucha
- Millpu
- Mishi Waqanan
- Miyu
- Muki
- Pirwa Hirka
- Pistaq
- Puka
- Punta Wayi
- Phiruru
- P'ukru
- Qawi
- Quyllur
- Q'illuqucha
- Ranrapata
- Shapra
- Shashima
- Tunshu
- Wanquyru
- Waqraqucha
- Waylla Hirka
- Wayllura
- Yana Allpa
- Yana Kancha
- Yana Mach'ay
- Yana Parya
- Yana Paryan
- Yana P'itaq
- Yana Uqhu
- Yawarqucha
- Yaru Wayñu
- Yuraq Parya

== Political division ==
The province is divided into six districts, which are:

District	Mayor
Andajes	Juan Antonio Bernabe Conejo
Caujul	Olmer Luis Torres Albornoz
Cochamarca	Fernando Carrera Gervacio
Navan	Antenogenes Rosales Emeterio
Oyón	Reynaldo Alcoser Medina
Pachangara	Marcos Justo Ugarte Huaman

== See also ==
- Chawpiqucha
