= Huacshash =

Mountain in Peru

- Huaqshash
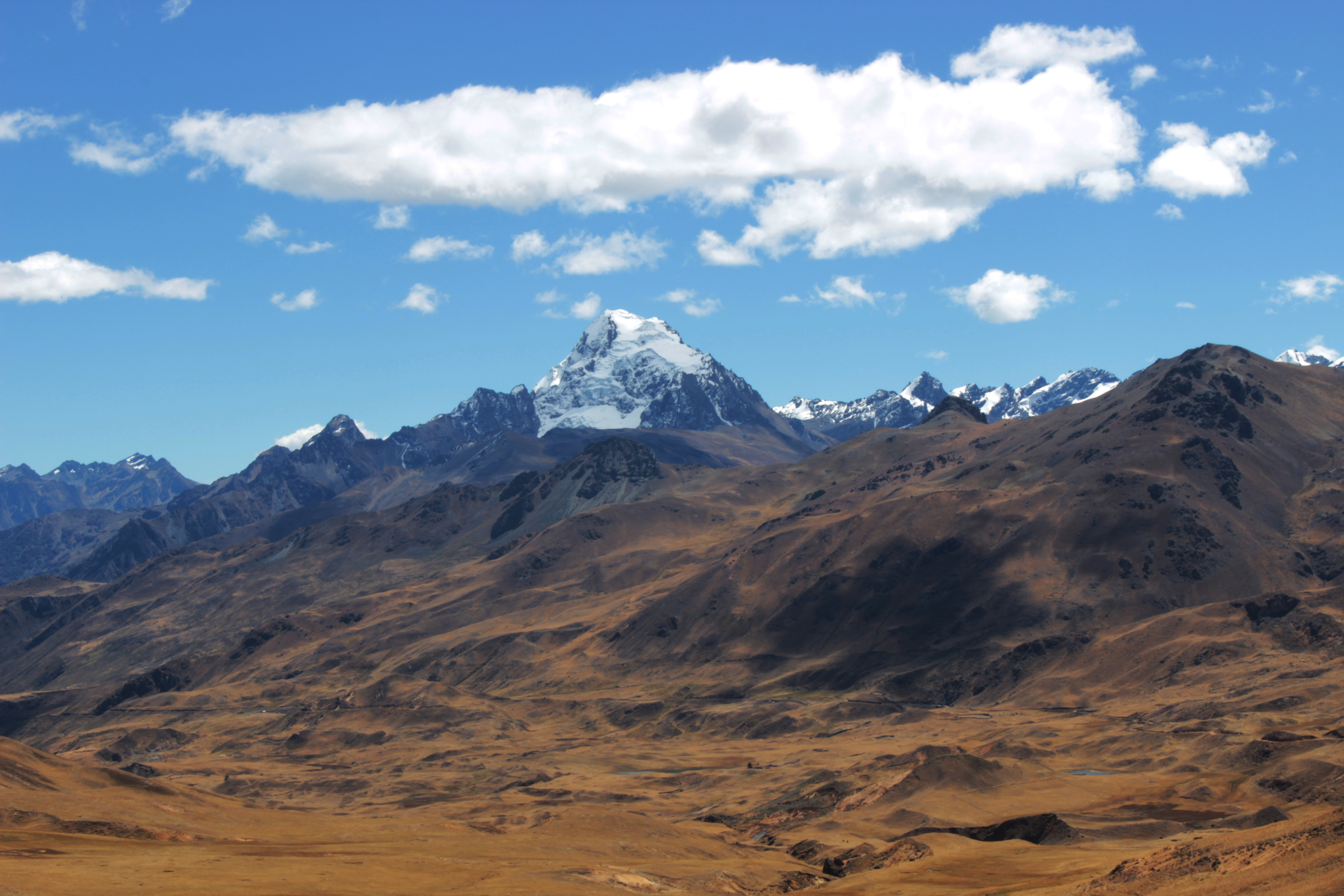

Highest point
- Elevation: 5,644 m (18,517 ft)
- Listing: List of mountains in Peru
- Coordinates: 10°24′50″S 76°58′30″W

Naming
- Language of name: Quechua

Geography
- Location within Peru
- Location: Peru, Lima Region
- Parent range: Andes, Huayhuash

Huacshash or Huaqshash (possibly from local Quechua waqsa, meaning eye tooth) is a mountain in the west of the Huayhuash mountain range in the Andes of Peru, about 5,644 metres (18,517 ft) high. It is located in the Lima Region, Cajatambo Province, Cajatambo District. Huacshash lies on a sub-range in the west, south of the Huayllapa River, north of the Pumarinri River and southeast of the villages of Huayllapa and Auquimarca.
