= Cordillera Huayhuash =

Mountain range in the Andes of Peru

Huayhuash
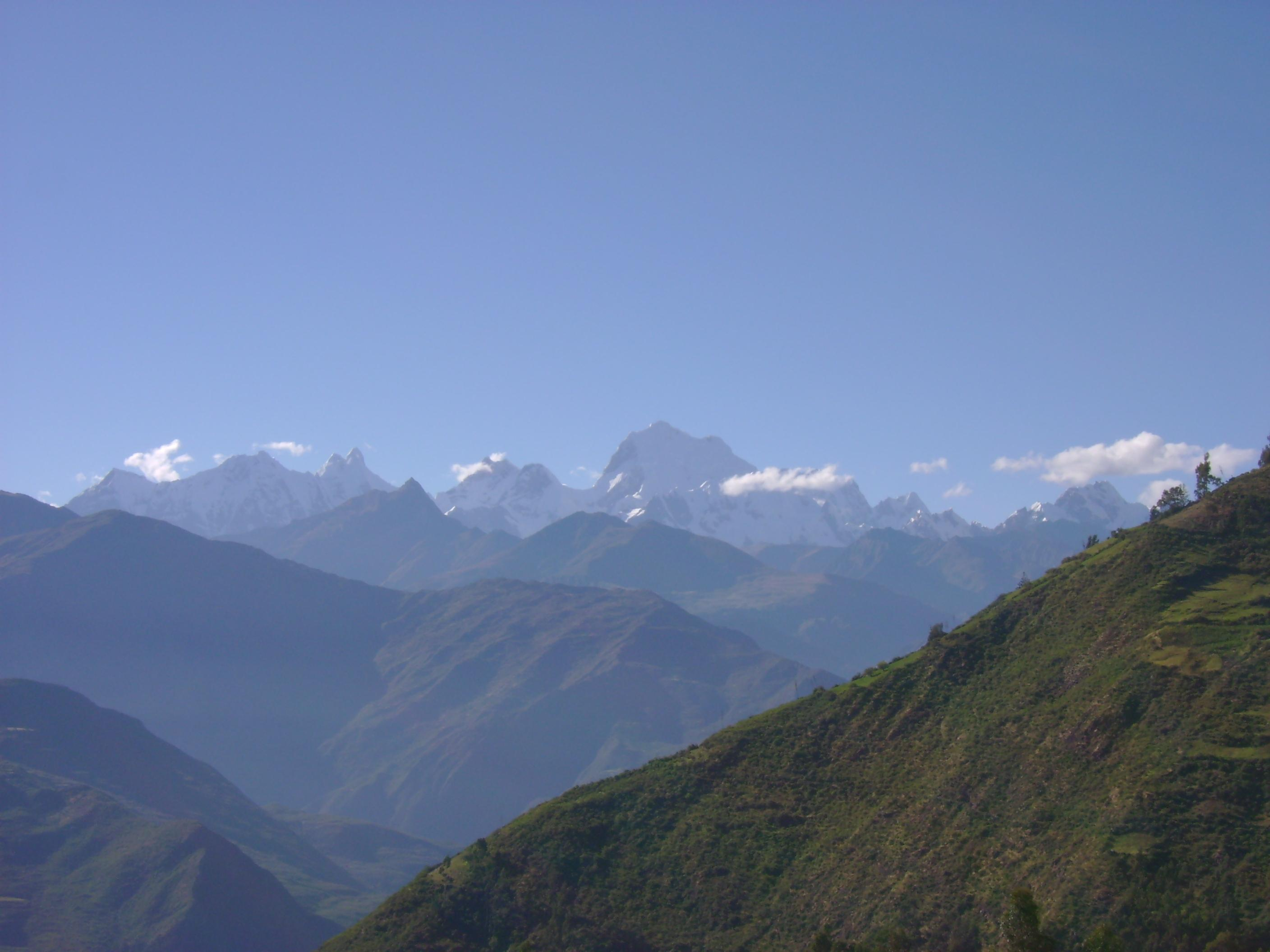
- View of the range with Yerupajá in the center

Highest point
- Peak: Yerupajá
- Elevation: 6,635 m (21,768 ft)

Dimensions
- Length: 30 km (19 mi) N-S

Geography
- Location within Peru
- Country: Peru
- Region(s): Áncash, Huánuco, Lima
- Range coordinates: 10°18′S 76°54′W
- Parent range: Cordillera Occidental (Peru) in the Andes

Geology
- Rock types: limestone; sandstone; slate

Huayhuash (possibly from Quechua waywash, weasel, or waywashi, squirrel) is a mountain range within the Andes of Peru, in the boundaries of the regions of Ancash, Lima and Huánuco. Since 2002 it is protected within the Cordillera Huayhuash Reserved Zone.

== Geography ==
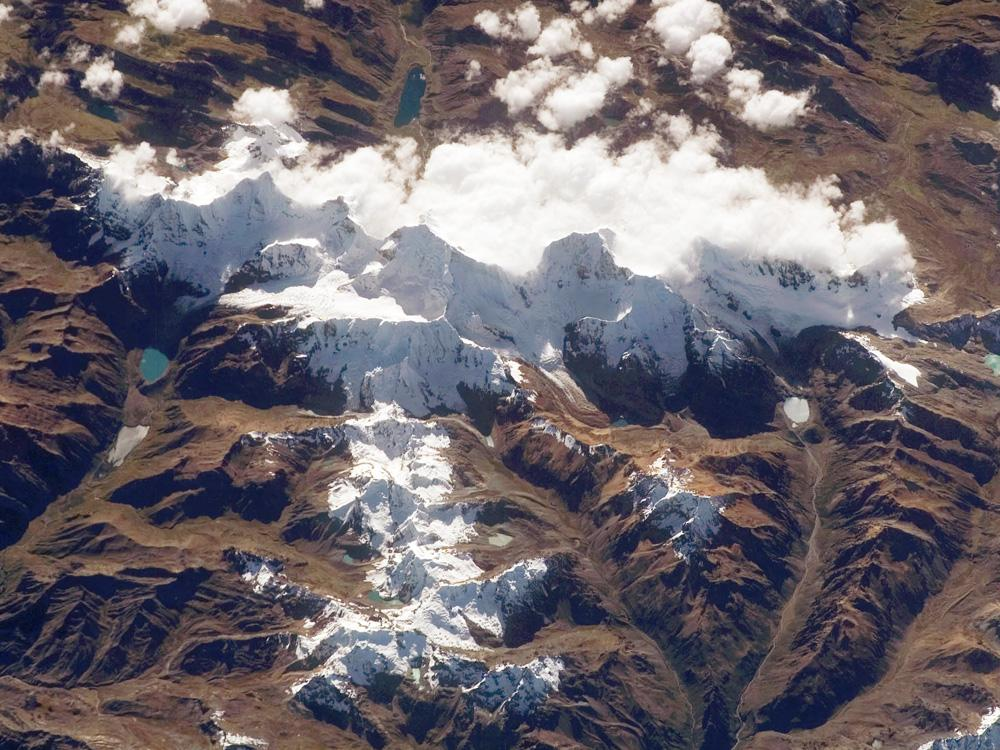
Huayhuash range as seen from the International Space Station in 2008.

The Huayhuash range is 30 km long north to south and includes seven peaks over 6000 m including Yerupajá, which, at 6,617 metres (21,709 ft), is the second highest peak in Peru. Another notable peak, Siula (6,344 m) was made famous by mountaineer Joe Simpson in his book Touching the Void. Compared to the neighboring Cordillera Blanca, Huayhuash possesses narrower valleys and higher mountain passes. There are many lesser peaks surrounding those covered by ice, and several passes exceeding 5,000 m. It is necessary to travel a considerable distance from the central range to find ground lower than 3,000 m, even on valley floors, and the range is often taken to include this much larger area. The vegetated areas of the range are part of the Central Andean wet puna ecoregion.

The area is scarcely populated, containing only small settlements generally found below 4000 m (the snowline is found at approximately 4,800 m). The nearest villages are Chiquián (3,400 m) and Cajatambo (3,375 m). Some mining takes place in the area, so to the north of the mountains there is an unsurfaced road leading up to as high as 4750 m. In 2002, the Peruvian Ministry of Agriculture declared the Huayhuash mountain range a "reserved zone" and prohibited certain economic activities, including any future mining.

=== Peaks ===
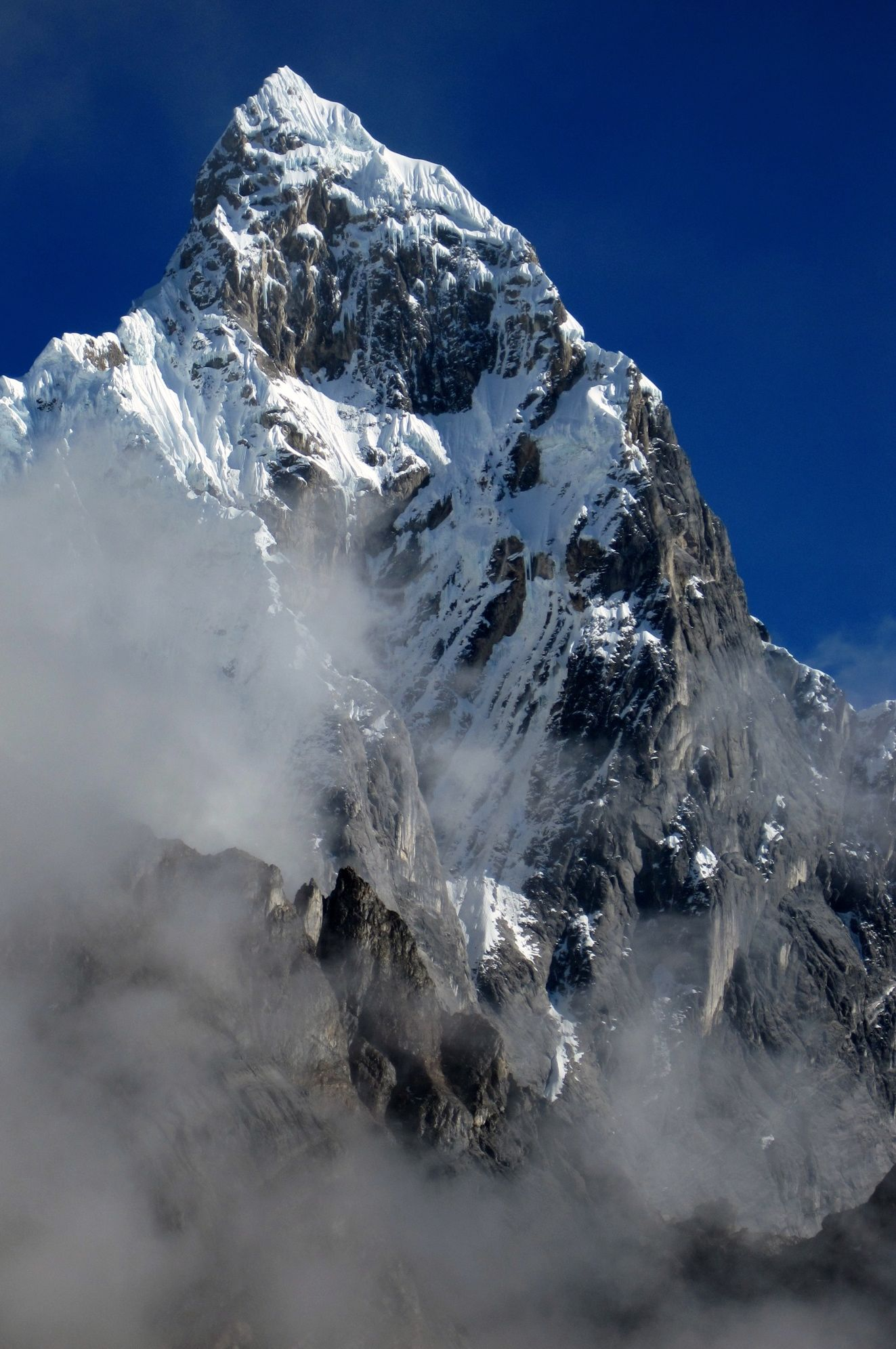
Jirishanca

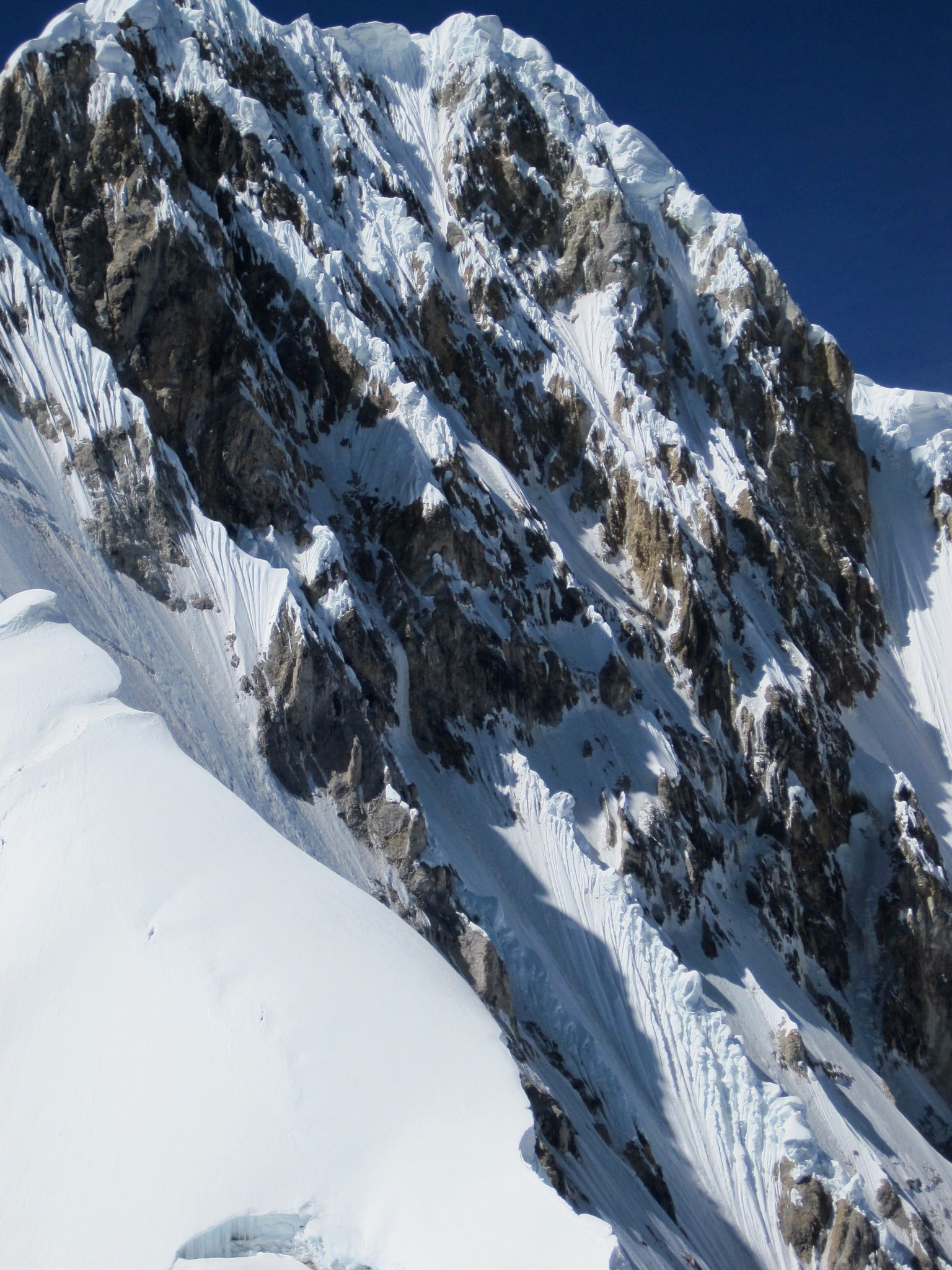
Siula

A selection of the highest peaks of the Huayhuash range is listed below.

- Yerupajá, 6,617 metres (21,709 ft)
- Siula, 6,344 metres (20,814 ft)
- Sarapo, 6,127 metres (20,102 ft)
- Jirishanca, 6,094 metres (19,993 ft)
- Yerupaja Chico, 6,089 metres (19,977 ft)
- Rasac, 6,017 metres (19,741 ft)
- Carnicero, 5,960 metres (19,554 ft)
- Rondoy, 5,870 metres (19,259 ft)
- Seria N, 5,860 metres (19,226 ft)
- El Toro, 5,830 metres (19,127 ft)
- Tsacra (or Sacra), 5,774 metres (18,944 ft)
- Mituraju, 5,750 metres (18,865 ft)
- Jurau, 5,674 metres (18,615 ft)
- Trapecio, 5,653 metres (18,547 ft)
- Huacshash, 5,644 metres (18,517 ft)
- Suerococha, 5,625 metres (18,455 ft)
- Huacrish, 5,622 metres (18,445 ft)
- Ninashanca, 5,607 metres (18,396 ft)
- Quesillo, 5,600 metres (18,373 ft)
- Pariauccro, 5,572 metres (18,281 ft)
- Mitopunta, 5,571 metres (18,278 ft)
- Seria Punta, 5,567 metres (18,264 ft)
- Ancocancha, 5,560 metres (18,241 ft)
- Auxilio, 5,560 metres (18,241 ft)
- Cuyoc, 5,550 metres (18,209 ft)
- Huaraca, 5,537 metres (18,166 ft)
- Pumarinri, 5,465 metres (17,930 ft)
- Jirishanca Chico, 5,446 metres (17,867 ft)
- Sueroraju, 5,439 metres (17,844 ft)
- Rajucollota, 5,427 metres (17,805 ft)
- Puscanturpa, 5,400 metres (17,717 ft)
- Jullutahuarco, 5,400 metres (17,717 ft)
- Sarapococha, 5,370 metres (17,618 ft)
- Alcay, 5,300 metres (17,388 ft)
- Paria, 5,190 metres (17,028 ft)
- Suerococha (Ancash), 5,100 metres (16,732 ft)
- Suerococha (Cajatambo), 5,000 metres (16,404 ft)
- Julcán, 4,900 metres (16,076 ft)
- Gasha, 4,880 metres (16,010 ft)

== Trekking ==
The range has become noted for trekking in the form of the Huayhuash Circuit, which is considered a challenge trail and is undoubtedly far more demanding than the famous Inca Trail in the south of Peru. Fewer people trek the Cordillera Huayhuash than the nearby Cordillera Blanca. The full circuit is about 130 km long and generally takes between ten and fourteen days, depending on the variant taken.

Most of the walking and most of the campsites are above the 4,000 m tree line, so the landscape appears rugged and mountainous, affording views over very wide areas. The area is noted for its spectacular glacial lakes. Hot springs can also be found in the area, at Viconga Campsite precisely. Condors, llamas, alpacas and viscachas can be seen. Trekking is almost always undertaken in the dry winter months of May to September, and the cities Huaraz and Caraz over 100 & 167 km away are the usual choice for organizing and hiring camping and/or logistical support. Chiquián was the "Gateway to the Huayhuash" for a long time. But nowadays, daily buses (locally called colectivos) go deep into the mountains to the village Llamaq (3,300 m) and with private transport, as far as Cuartelwain camp, reached both by road built in the late 90s and 2000s, becoming now the new trail heads for starting/ending.

More challenging yet is the Alpine Circuit, which encircles the peaks at closer proximity. The Alpine Circuit involves some rock climbing and glacier travel, and takes 8–10 days to complete.

There are several lakes like Solteracoha (or Solterococha), Siula, Jahuacocha, Carhuacocha and Sarapococha.

Mitucocha camp and Jirishanca (6094 m)

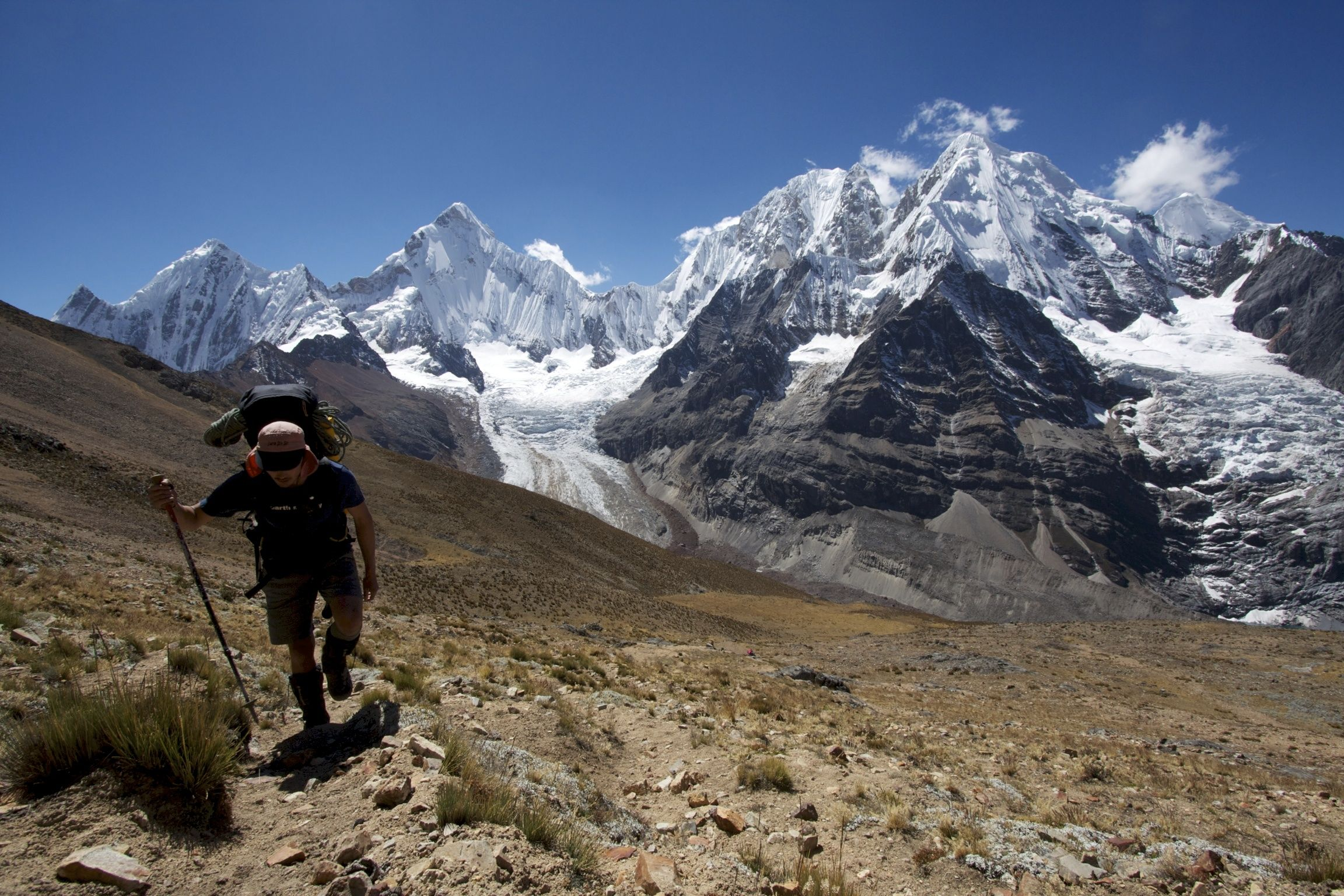
Hiking the Alpine Circuit in the Waywash mountain range. In the background are (L to R) Rasac, Yerupaja, Siula Grande and Sarapo.

== Geology ==
The region is primarily composed of limestone, accompanied by sandstone and slate. These sedimentary rocks originated as deposits on the ocean floor and were subsequently uplifted and folded due to tectonic plate convergence. Over time, these rocks have eroded and developed cracks. Marine fossils, such as bivalves and ammonites, can occasionally be found embedded in the rock.

== Safety ==
Until the group's effective defeat in 1992, the Huayhuash range was used as a remote base by the Shining Path communist guerrilla. On July 28, 1988, a group of Canadian and Peruvian climbers were held hostage for 12 hours after a failed assassination attempt on a group of military police. None of the climbers or police were hurt, though one Senderista was killed. In the late 1980s a party of European trekkers were robbed and ordered to return to Huaraz with the message that future intruders would be killed. The remains of a guerrilla camp can be seen near the lake Viconga.

Two foreign trekkers are known to have been murdered in Cajatambo in August 2002, though this is thought to have been motivated by robbery. In 2004, four hikers who resisted armed robbery were shot, one of which died of blood loss before they could be rescued. Since this last incident, the local communities began to charge a "protection" fee for passing in the private properties. Since then, the area is considered generally safe.

Near the north shore of the lake Viconga, the remains of an old Shining Path base camp can be still visited, including a shooting range, barracks and a training field.

== Biodiversity ==
The area preserves high elevation Andean grasslands and patches of forest. Some of the native tree species present in the area are the Andean alder and trees of the genus Polylepis.

Animals that can be found in the area include: the giant conebill, the tit-like dacnis, the torrent duck, the Andean mountain cat, the taruca, the Andean condor, the peregrine falcon, the giant coot, etc.
