= Yanahuanca District =

Yanahuanca Yanawanka
- District
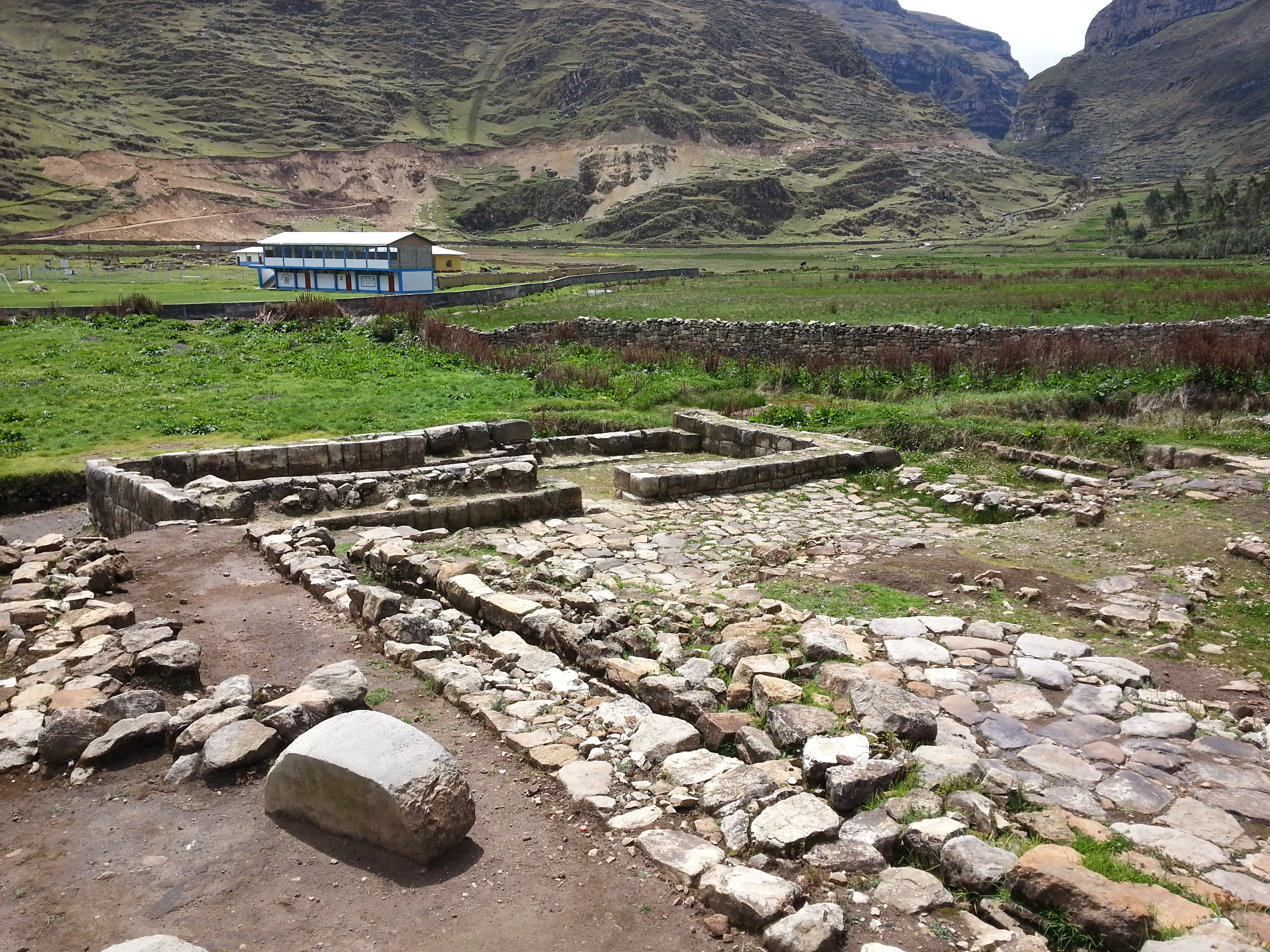
- Warmiwasi, part of the archaeological site of Warawtampu in the Yanahuanca District

- Location within Peru
- Coordinates: 10°29′29″S 76°30′49″W
- Country: Peru
- Region: Pasco
- Province: Daniel Alcides Carrión
- Capital: Yanahuanca

Government
  - Mayor: Juan Luis Chombo Heredia (2019-2022)

Area
  - Total: 923.48 km^{2} (356.56 sq mi)
- Elevation: 3,184 m (10,446 ft)

Population (2017)
  - Total: 11,333
  - Density: 12.272/km^{2} (31.784/sq mi)
- Time zone: UTC-5 (PET)
- Geocode: 190201

Yanahuanca District is one of eight districts of the Daniel Alcides Carrión Province in the mountains of central Peru.

== Geography ==
The Rawra mountain range traverses the district. Some of the highest mountains of the district are listed below:

- Ana Maray
- Atalaya
- Chakraqucha
- Challwayuq
- Chunta
- Ch'uspi
- Hanka Pata
- Hatun Punta
- Iskuqucha
- Kiswar
- Kunkayuq
- Kushurupata
- Paqush
- Parya Chuku
- Puka Mach'ay
- Puma Ratashqa
- Pumaqucha
- Punta Ch'aqra
- Puywanqucha
- Phiruru
- Qullpapata
- Qutuq
- Qhuna Pirwa
- Q'illay Hanka
- Racha Kancha
- Rat'a Thapa
- Ruphaq
- Saqra Mach'ay
- Tuku Mach'ay
- Turi Hanka
- Wacha
- Wanchaq
- Warmi Wañusqa
- Waswa Qaqa
- Yana Chaka
- Yana Uqhu
- Yanta Hirka

== Climate ==
Climate data for Yanahuanca, elevation 3,137 m (10,292 ft), (1991–2020)
Month	Jan	Feb	Mar	Apr	May	Jun	Jul	Aug	Sep	Oct	Nov	Dec	Year
Mean daily maximum °C (°F)	19.8 (67.6)	19.6 (67.3)	19.4 (66.9)	20.2 (68.4)	21.0 (69.8)	21.3 (70.3)	21.0 (69.8)	21.2 (70.2)	20.7 (69.3)	20.6 (69.1)	20.9 (69.6)	19.8 (67.6)	20.5 (68.8)
Mean daily minimum °C (°F)	7.8 (46.0)	8.0 (46.4)	8.1 (46.6)	7.8 (46.0)	7.2 (45.0)	6.5 (43.7)	6.0 (42.8)	6.3 (43.3)	7.2 (45.0)	7.5 (45.5)	7.7 (45.9)	7.8 (46.0)	7.3 (45.2)
Average precipitation mm (inches)	108.2 (4.26)	100.3 (3.95)	123.9 (4.88)	66.4 (2.61)	28.8 (1.13)	11.8 (0.46)	13.1 (0.52)	11.5 (0.45)	29.3 (1.15)	62.1 (2.44)	78.0 (3.07)	101.4 (3.99)	734.8 (28.91)
Source: National Meteorology and Hydrology Service of Peru

== See also ==
- Daniel Alcides Carrión
- Pukamayu
- Warawtampu
