= Jullutahuarco =

Mountain in Peru

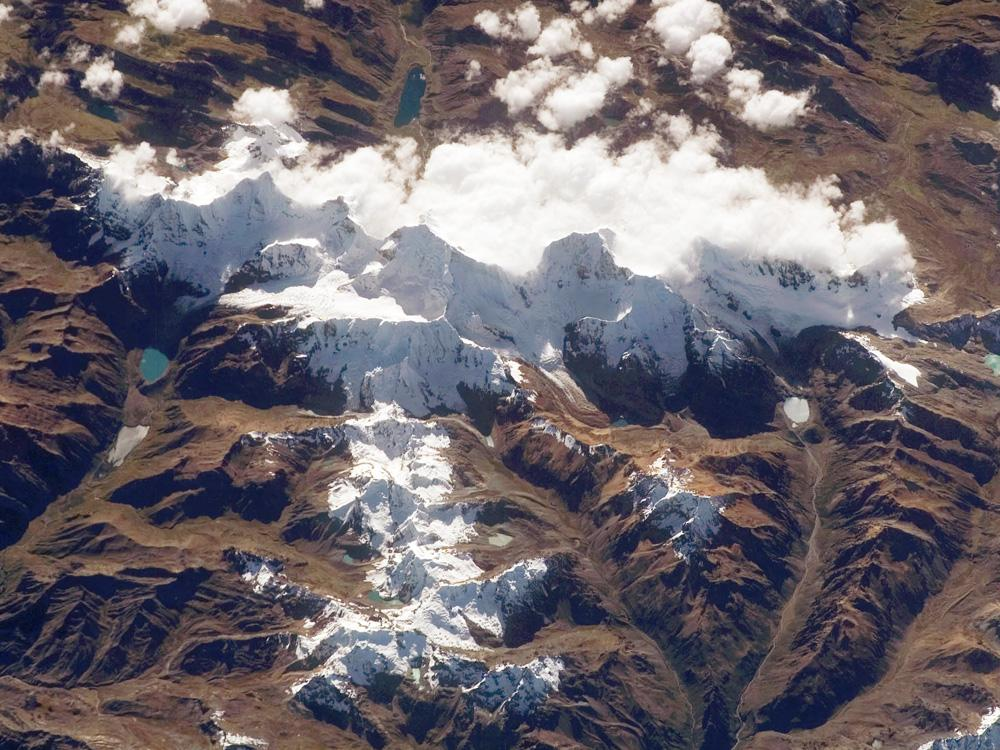
- Huayhuash mountain range from space, looking to the east. Yerupaja and Siula Grande are in the center. Jullutahuarco lies on the sub-range in the foreground (center).

Highest point
- Elevation: 5,400 m (17,700 ft)
- Listing: List of mountains in Peru
- Coordinates: 10°19′33″S 76°58′28″W

Naming
- Language of name: Quechua

Geography
- Location within Peru
- Location: Peru, Lima Region
- Parent range: Andes, Huayhuash

Jullutahuarco (possibly from Quechua qulluta, kalluta mortar, warkhu hanging; a coin,) is a mountain in the west of the Huayhuash mountain range in the Andes of Peru, about 5,400 metres (17,717 ft) high. It is located in the Lima Region, Cajatambo Province, Copa District. Jullutahuarco lies on the sub-range west of Yerupaja, south of Rajucollota, Huacrish and Auxilio. It is situated north of the Huayllapa River.
