= Daniel Alcides Carrión province =

Coordinates: 10.490545°S 76.511208°W

Daniel Alcídes Carrión
- Province
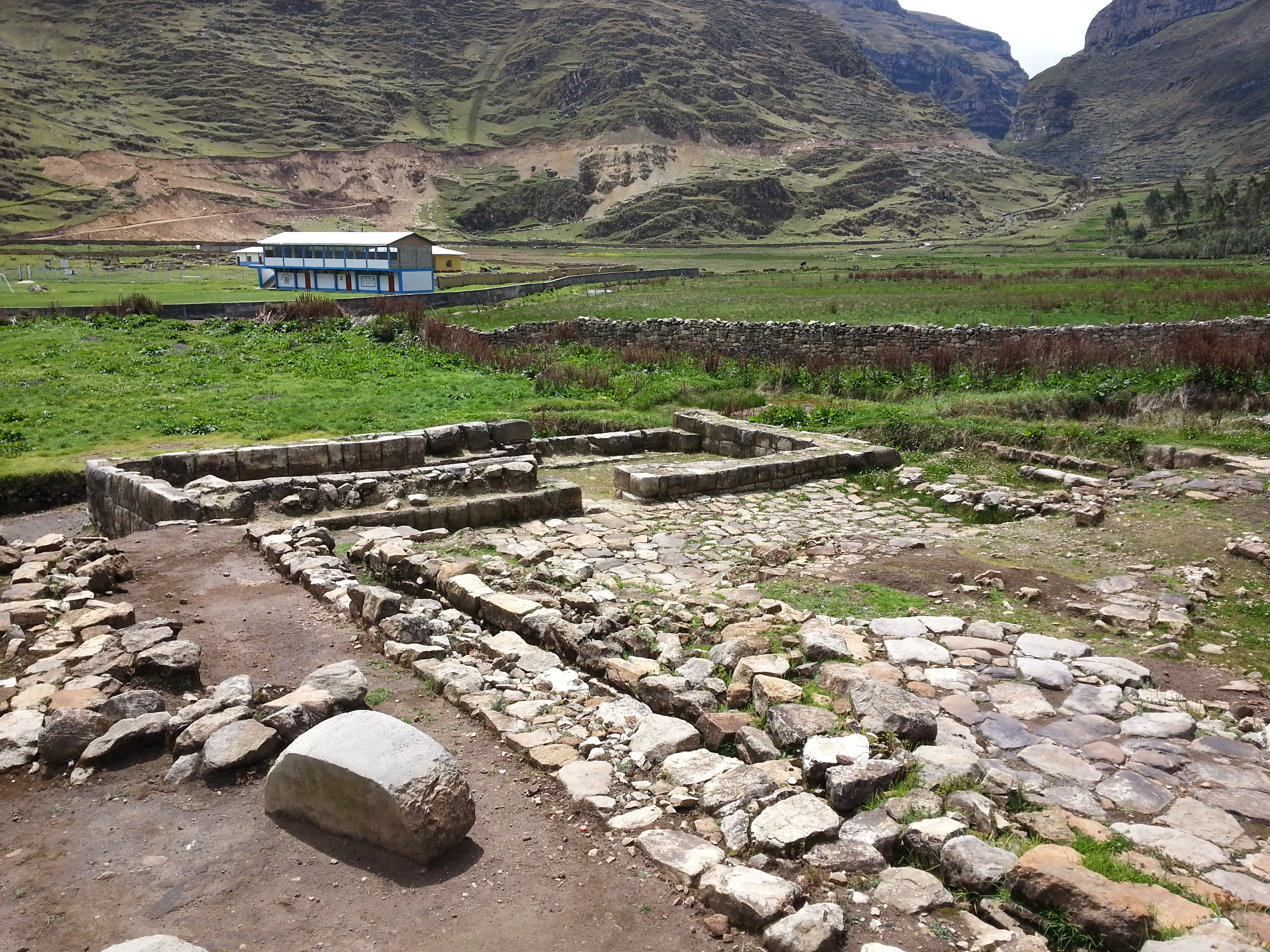
- Warmiwasi at the archaeological site of Warawtampu in the Yanahuanca District

- Coat of arms

- Location of Daniel Alcídes Carrión in the Pasco Region
- Country: Peru
- Region: Pasco
- Capital: Yanahuanca

Government
  - Mayor: Juan Luis Chombo (2019-2022)

Area
  - Total: 1,887.23 km^{2} (728.66 sq mi)

Population
  - Total: 43,580
  - Density: 23.09/km^{2} (59.81/sq mi)
- UBIGEO: 1902
- Website: www.munidc.gob.pe

Daniel Alcides Carrión is the smallest of three provinces that make up the Pasco Region in Peru. It was named after the medical student Daniel Alcides Carrión. The capital of this province is Yanahuanca.

== Boundaries ==
- North: Huánuco Region
- East: province of Pasco
- South: province of Pasco
- West: Lima Region

== Geography ==
The Rawra mountain range and the Rumi Cruz mountain range traverse the province. One of the highest peaks of the province is Puywanqucha at about 5,200 m (17,060 ft) above sea level. Other mountains are listed below:

- Ana Maray
- Anta P'itiq
- Atalaya
- Chakraqucha
- Challwayuq
- Chunta
- Ch'uspi
- Hanka Pata
- Hatun Punta
- Iskuqucha
- Kiswar
- Kunkayuq
- Kushurupata
- Paqush
- Parya Chuku
- Puka Mach'ay
- Puma Ratashqa
- Pumaqucha
- Punta Ch'aqra
- Puywanqucha
- Phiruru
- Qullpapata
- Qutuq
- Qhuna Pirwa
- Q'illay Hanka
- Racha Kancha
- Rat'a Thapa
- Ruphaq
- Saqra Mach'ay
- Tuku Mach'ay
- Turi Hanka
- Wacha
- Wanchaq
- Warmi Wañusqa
- Waswa Qaqa
- Yana Chaka
- Yana Uqhu
- Yanta Hirka

== Districts ==
The province is divided into eight districts, which are:

- Yanahuanca
- Chacayán
- Goyllarisquizga
- Paucar
- San Pedro de Pillao
- Santa Ana de Tusi
- Tapuc
- Vilcabamba

== See also ==
- Allqaqucha
- Daniel Alcides Carrión
- Kuntuyuq
- Pukamayu
- Warawtampu
- Yana Uqhu
- Yuraq Mach'ay
