= Suerococha (Ancash) =

Mountain in Peru

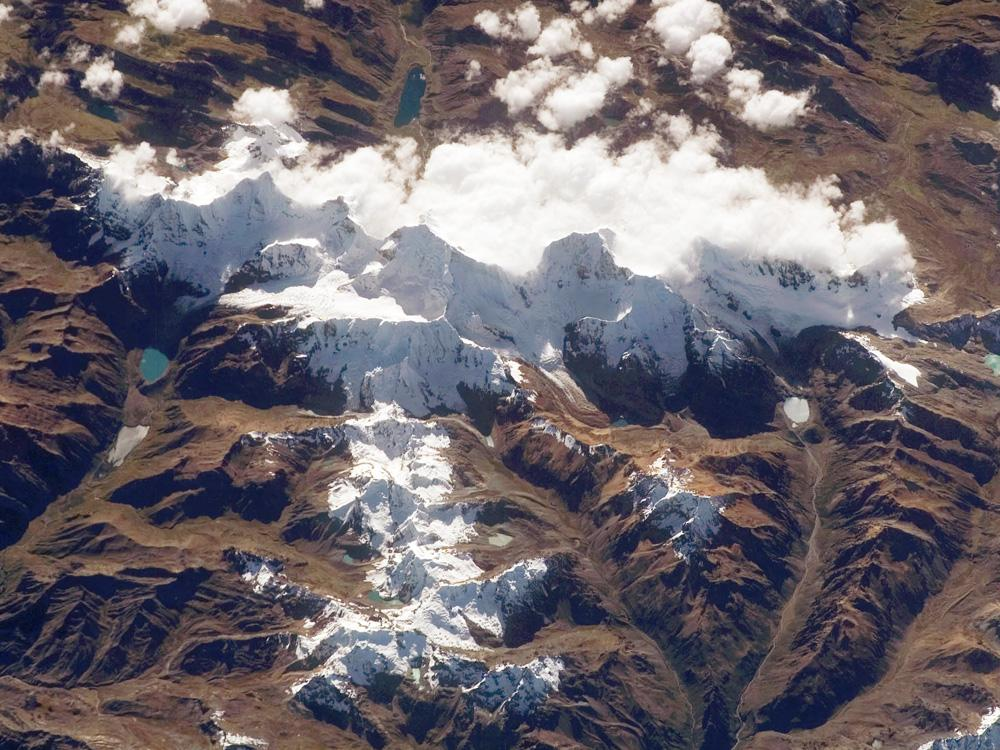
- Huayhuash mountain range from space, looking to the northeast. Yerupaja and Siula are in the centre. Suerococha lies almost at the end of the sub-range in the foreground.

Highest point
- Elevation: 5,100 m (16,700 ft)
- Listing: List of mountains in Peru
- Coordinates: 10°17′11″S 76°58′33″W

Naming
- Language of name: Quechua

Geography
- Location within Peru
- Location: Peru, Ancash Region
- Parent range: Andes, Huayhuash

Suerococha (possibly from Quechua suyru a very long dress tracked after when worn, qucha lake,) is a mountain in the west of the Huayhuash mountain range in the Andes of Peru, about 5,100 metres (16,732 ft) high, and the name of a small lake near the mountain. The mountain is located in the Ancash Region, Bolognesi Province, Pacllon District. Suyruqucha lies on a sub-range west of Yerupaja, northwest of Huacrish and Auxilio and northeast of Rajucollota.

The mountain might have been named after a little lake southwest of it. It lies in the Copa District of the Lima Region at 10°18′20″S 76°59′15″W.
