= Sarapo =

Mountain in Peru

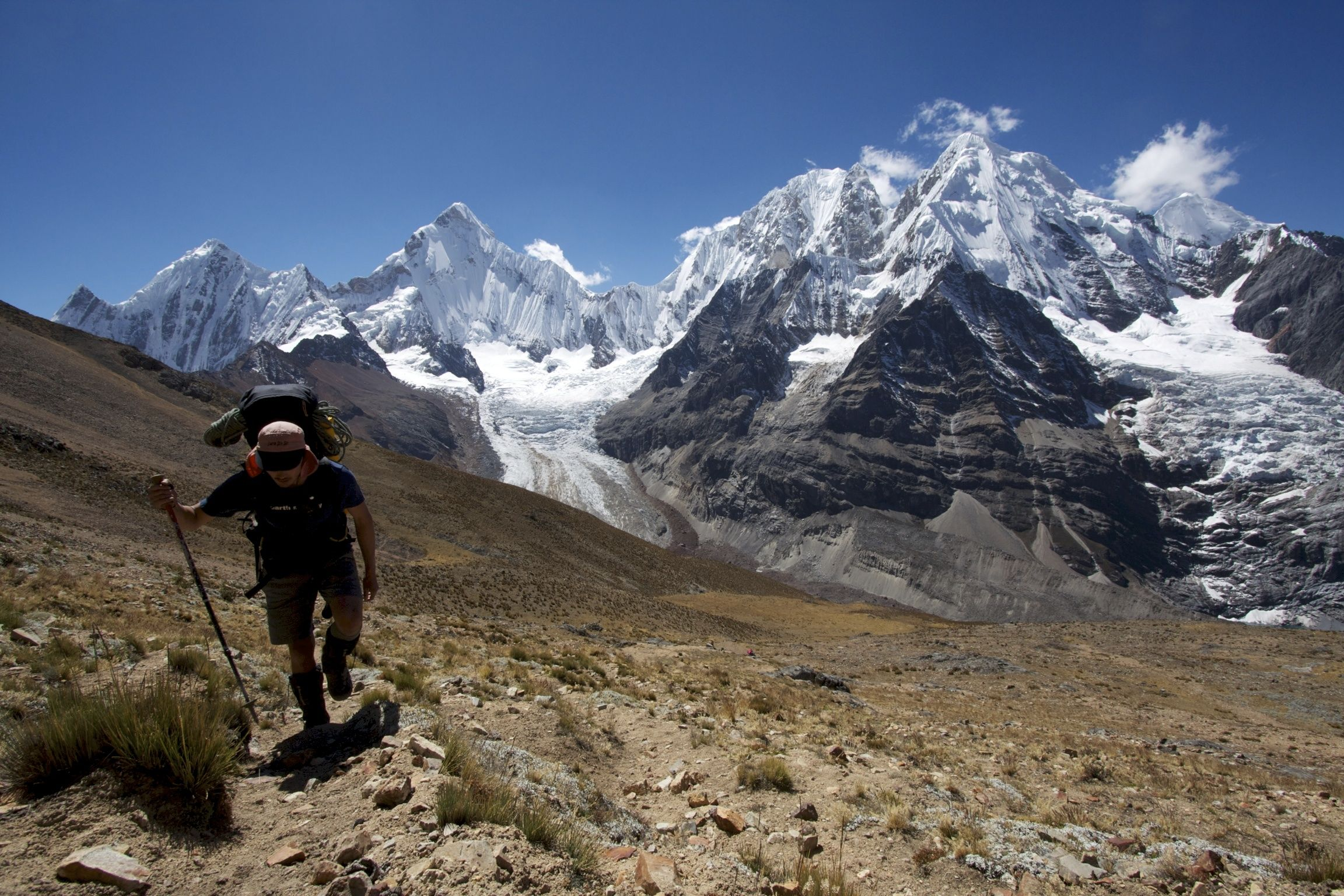
- Rasac, Yerupaja, Siula Grande and Sarapo (l. to r.), Huayhuash mountain range

Highest point
- Elevation: 6,127 m (20,102 ft)
- Coordinates: 10°18′06″S 76°53′34″W

Geography
- Location within Peru
- Location: Huánuco Region, Lima Region
- Parent range: Andes, Huayhuash

Sarapo is a mountain in the Huayhuash mountain range in the Andes of Peru, about 6,127 metres (20,102 ft) high. It is located in the Huánuco Region, Lauricocha Province, Jesús District as well as in the Lima Region, Cajatambo Province, in the districts Cajatambo and Copa. Sarapo lies south of the Yerupaja and the Siula Grande and east of the lake Sarapococha.

== See also ==
- Rasac
