= Cule (disambiguation) =

Cule is a mountain in Peru.

Cule may also refer to:

- Cule (surname)
- Ćule, a mountain in Kosovo.
- Čule, a village in Bosnia and Herzegovina
