= Rajucollota =

Mountain in Peru

- Diablo Mudo, Suerococha
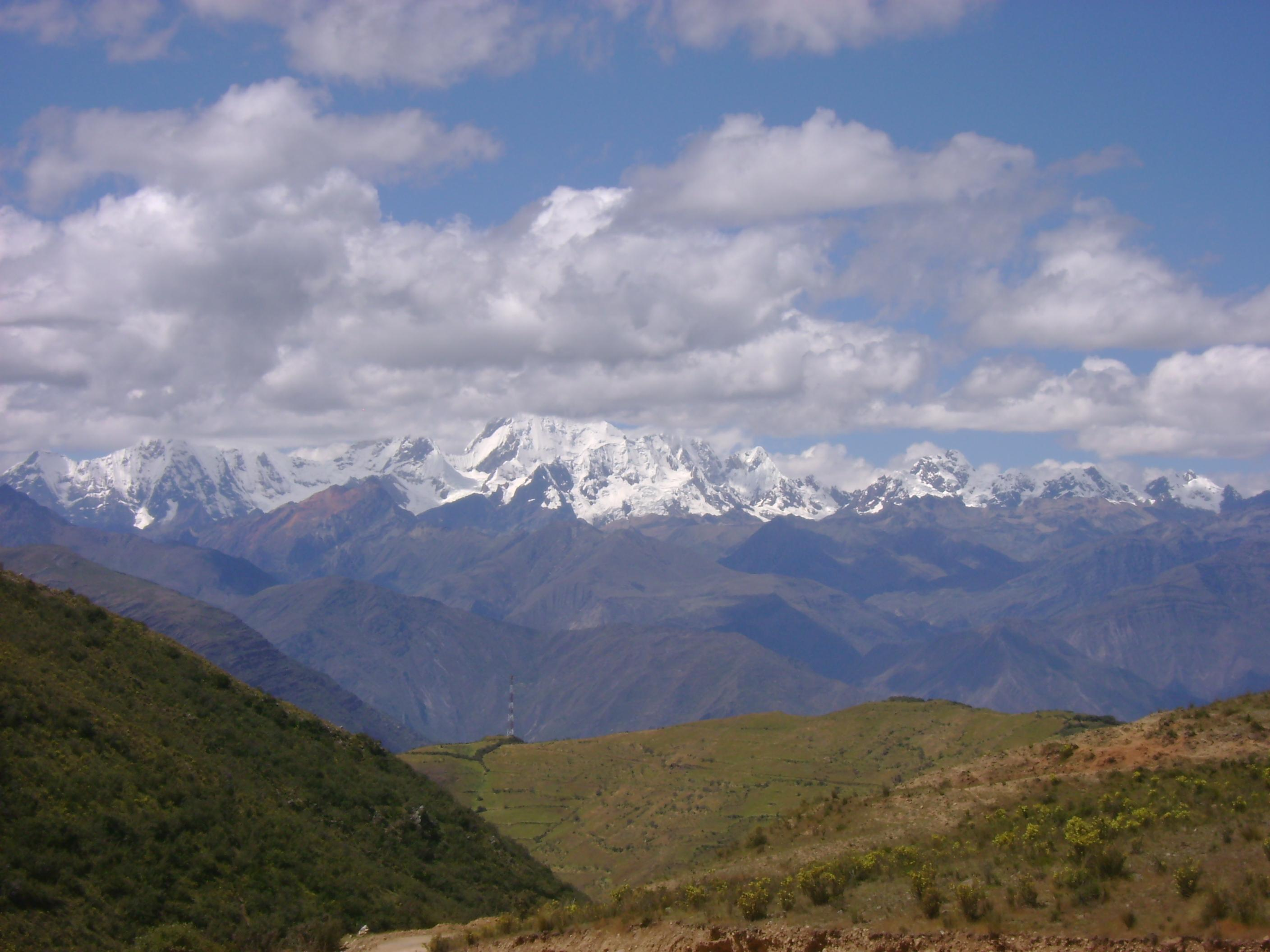
- Huayhuash mountain range with Yerupaja (center-left) and the sub-range west of it (on the right). Rajucollota is visible on the right.

Highest point
- Elevation: 5,427 m (17,805 ft)
- Listing: List of mountains in Peru
- Coordinates: 10°17′50″S 76°58′50″W

Naming
- Language of name: Quechua

Geography
- Location within Peru
- Location: Peru, Ancash Region, Lima Region
- Parent range: Andes, Huayhuash

Climbing
- First ascent: 1-1964

Rajucollota (possibly from Quechua rahu snow, ice, mountain with snow, qulluta, kalluta mortar), Suerococha (possibly from Quechua suyru very long dress tracked after when worn, qucha lake,), named after the nearby lake, or Diablo Mudo (Spanish for "dumb devil") is a mountain in the west of the Huayhuash mountain range in the Andes of Peru, about 5,427 metres (17,805 ft) high. It is located in the Ancash Region, Bolognesi Province, Pacllon District, and in the Lima Region, Cajatambo Province, Copa District. Rajucollota lies on a sub-range west of Yerupaja, west of the mountain Huacrish, northwest of the mountain Auxilio and north of the lake Suerococha.

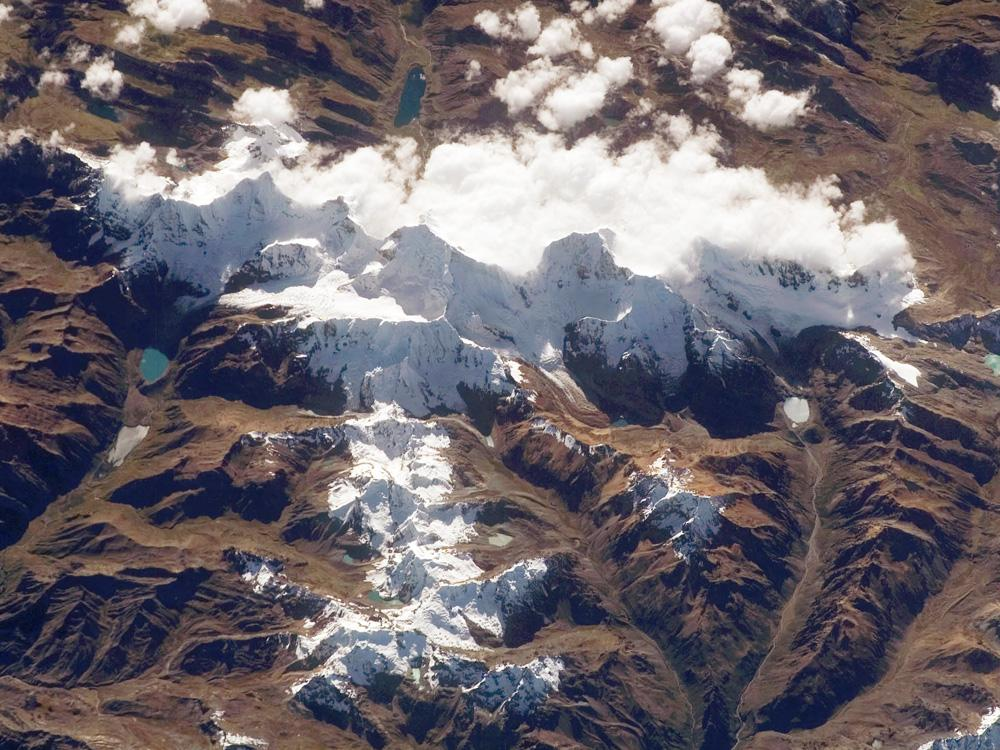
Huayhuash mountain range from space, looking to the northeast. Yerupaja and Siula Grande are in the centre. Rajucollota lies almost at the end of the sub-range in the foreground.
