= Suyruqucha =

Suyruqucha (Quechua suyru a very long dress tracked after when worn, qucha lake, also spelled Soirococha, Suericocha, Suerococha, Suirococha) may refer to:

- Suyruqucha or Rahu Qulluta, a mountain in the Ancash Region, Bolognesi Province, Pacllon District, and in the Lima Region, Cajatambo Province, Copa District, Peru
- Suyruqucha (Ancash), a mountain at a small lake of that name in the Ancash Region, Bolognesi Province, Pacllon District, Peru
- Suyruqucha (Cajatambo), a mountain at a small lake of that name in the Lima Region, Cajatambo Province, Peru
- Suyruqucha (Cusco), a mountain in the Cusco Region, Peru
- Suyruqucha (Huallanca), a lake in the Huallanca District, Bolognesi Province, Ancash Region, Peru
- Suyruqucha (Huarochirí), a mountain in the Lima Region, Huarochirí Province, Peru
- Suyruqucha (Junín), a mountain in the Jauja Province, Junín Region, Peru
- Suyruqucha (Junín-Lima), a mountain in the Junín Region and in the Lima Region, Peru
