= Challwayuq =

Mountain in Peru

- Location within Peru

Highest point
- Elevation: 4,800 m (15,700 ft)
- Coordinates: 10°33′18″S 76°40′31″W

Geography
- Location: Peru, Pasco Region
- Parent range: Andes

Challwayuq (Quechua challwa fish, -yuq a suffix, "the one with fish", also spelled Chalhuayoc) is a mountain in the Andes of Peru whose summit reaches about 4,800 m (15,748 ft) above sea level. It is located in the Pasco Region, Daniel Alcides Carrión Province, Yanahuanca District. Challwayuq lies northwest of Yana Chaka.
