= Condorsenja =

Mountain in Peru

- Location within Peru

Highest point
- Elevation: 5,379 m (17,648 ft)
- Coordinates: 10°29′18″S 76°44′32″W

Geography
- Location: Lima Region, Peru
- Parent range: Andes, Raura mountain range

Condorsenja or Condorshenga (possibly from Quechua kuntur condor, sinqa nose, "condor nose") is a mountain in the Raura mountain range in the Andes of Peru with 5,379 metres (17,648 ft) of elevation. It is located in the Lima Region, Oyón Province, Oyón District. Condorsenja lies south of the lakes T'inkiqucha and Puywanqucha and west of mount Santa Rosa.
