= Western Cordillera =

Western Cordilleras can refer to

- The North American Cordillera, along the western side of North America
- Mountain ranges in the Andes of South America:
  - Cordillera Occidental (Central Andes), in Bolivia and Chile
  - Cordillera Occidental (Colombia)
  - Cordillera Occidental (Ecuador)
  - Cordillera Occidental (Peru)
- Part of the Cordillera Central (Luzon) in the Philippines
- A mountain range in Borneo
