= Yana Uqhu =

Yana Uqhu (Quechua yana black, uqhu swamp, "black swamp", Hispanicized spellings Yanaocco, Yanaoco, Yanaogo, Yanaojo) may refer to:

- Yana Uqhu (Apurímac), a mountain in the Apurímac Region, Peru
- Yana Uqhu (Huaral-Huaura), a mountain on the border of the Huaral Province and the Huaura Province, Lima Region, Peru
- Yana Uqhu (Oyón), a mountain in the Oyón Province, Lima Region, Peru
- Yana Uqhu (Pasco), a mountain in the Pasco Region, Peru
