= Vilcanota =

Vilcanota may refer to:

- Vilcanota River (Rio Vilcanota), a segment of the Urubamba River in Peru
- Cordillera Vilcanota, a mountain range in the Cusco Region, Peru, including a dozen mountains above 6000 meters
- Vilcanota, a populated place in the La Paz Department, Bolivia
