= Lake Sarapococha =

Lake in Huanuco, Peru

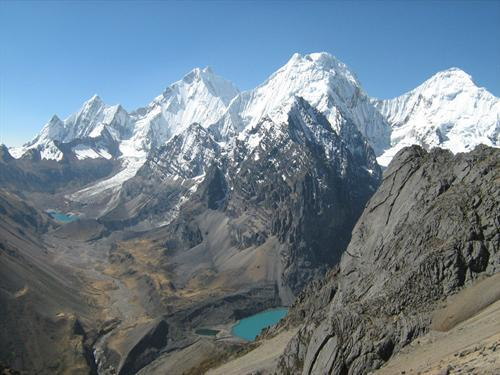
- Lake Sarapococha (on the left) in front of the Rasac, Huayhuash mountain range

- Location within Peru
- Location: Peru; Lima Region
- Coordinates: 10°18′44″S 76°54′48″W
- Max. length: 0.63 km (0.39 mi)
- Max. width: 0.28 km (0.17 mi)
- Surface elevation: 4,495 m (14,747 ft)

Lake Sarapococha or Lake Sarapacocha (possibly from Quechua qucha lake), is a lake in the Huayhuash mountain range in the Andes of Peru. It is located in the Lima Region, Cajatambo Province, Copa District. It lies at the foot of the Sarapo (or Sarapa), south-west of it. Sarapococha is situated at a height of about 4,495 metres (14,747 ft), about 0.63 km long and 0.28 km at its widest point.

== See also ==
- List of lakes in Peru
