= Chacayán District =

Chacayán
- District
- Interactive map of Chacayán
- Coordinates: 10°26′33″S 76°25′06″W
- Country: Peru
- Region: Pasco
- Province: Daniel Alcides Carrión
- Capital: Chacayán

Government
  - Mayor: Esteban Paredes Mateo

Area
  - Total: 198.58 km^{2} (76.67 sq mi)
- Elevation: 3,357 m (11,014 ft)

Population (2005 census)
  - Total: 2,553
  - Density: 12.86/km^{2} (33.30/sq mi)
- Time zone: UTC-5 (PET)
- UBIGEO: 190202

Chacayán District is one of eight districts of the province Daniel Alcides Carrión in Peru.

== See also ==
- Kuntuyuq
- Yuraq Mach'ay
