= Quesillojanca =

Mountain in Peru

- Location within Peru

Highest point
- Elevation: 5,348 m (17,546 ft)
- Coordinates: 10°25′15″S 76°48′13″W

Geography
- Location: Between the regions of Huanuco and Lima; Peru
- Parent range: Raura, Andes

Quesillojanca is a mountain located on the boundary of the regions of Huanuco and Lima in Peru. It has an elevation of 5,348 metres (17,546 ft). It belongs to the Raura mountain range which is part of the Peruvian Andes.
