= Yanahuanca =

- Town
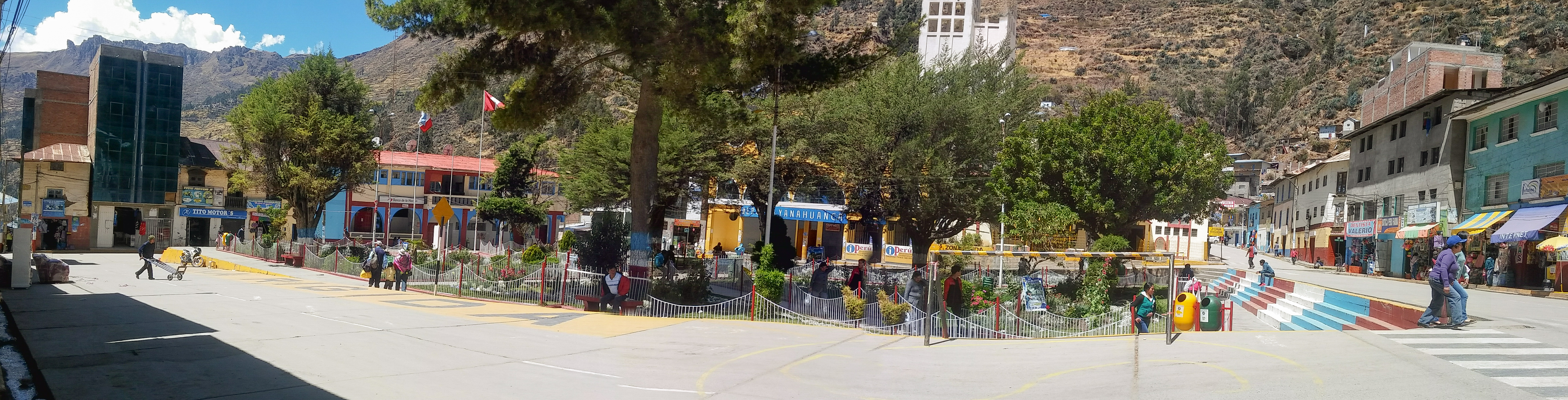
- Plaza de Armas of Yanahuanca

- Location within Peru
- Coordinates: 10°29′29″S 76°30′49″W
- Country: Peru
- Region: Pasco
- Province: Daniel Alcídes Carrión
- District: Yanahuanca

Government
  - Mayor: Juan Luis Chombo Heredia (2019-2022)
- Elevation: 3,184 m (10,446 ft)

Population (2017)
  - Total: 11,333
- Time zone: UTC-5 (PET)

Yanahuanca is a town in central Peru, capital of the province Daniel Alcídes Carrión in the region Pasco.

== Etymology ==
The name of the town, is a phrase composed by the Quechua adjective yana (black), and the Runasimi noun wanka ("huanca" in Spanish) that means "demarcatory stone", among other meanings; for what "yanahuanca" would be understood as "black stone".

== Climate ==
Climate data for Yanahuanca, elevation 3,137 m (10,292 ft), (1991–2020)
Month	Jan	Feb	Mar	Apr	May	Jun	Jul	Aug	Sep	Oct	Nov	Dec	Year
Mean daily maximum °C (°F)	19.8 (67.6)	19.6 (67.3)	19.4 (66.9)	20.2 (68.4)	21.0 (69.8)	21.3 (70.3)	21.0 (69.8)	21.2 (70.2)	20.7 (69.3)	20.6 (69.1)	20.9 (69.6)	19.8 (67.6)	20.5 (68.8)
Mean daily minimum °C (°F)	7.8 (46.0)	8.0 (46.4)	8.1 (46.6)	7.8 (46.0)	7.2 (45.0)	6.5 (43.7)	6.0 (42.8)	6.3 (43.3)	7.2 (45.0)	7.5 (45.5)	7.7 (45.9)	7.8 (46.0)	7.3 (45.2)
Average precipitation mm (inches)	108.2 (4.26)	100.3 (3.95)	123.9 (4.88)	66.4 (2.61)	28.8 (1.13)	11.8 (0.46)	13.1 (0.52)	11.5 (0.45)	29.3 (1.15)	62.1 (2.44)	78.0 (3.07)	101.4 (3.99)	734.8 (28.91)
Source: National Meteorology and Hydrology Service of Peru
