= San Pedro de Pillao District =

San Pedro de Pillao
- District
- Interactive map of San Pedro de Pillao
- Coordinates: 10°25′51″S 76°31′03″W
- Country: Peru
- Region: Pasco
- Province: Daniel Alcides Carrión
- Founded: December 15, 1959
- Capital: San Pedro de Pillao

Government
  - Mayor: Americo Reyes Sebastian

Area
  - Total: 92.17 km^{2} (35.59 sq mi)
- Elevation: 3,629 m (11,906 ft)

Population (2017)
  - Total: 1,348
  - Density: 14.63/km^{2} (37.88/sq mi)
- Time zone: UTC-5 (PET)
- UBIGEO: 190205

San Pedro de Pillao District is one of eight districts of the province Daniel Alcides Carrión in Peru.
