= Kuntuyuq =

Archaeological site in Peru

- Location within Peru
- 10°32′58″S 76°21′33″W
- Location: Peru, Pasco Region, Daniel Alcides Carrion Province, Chacayan District

Site notes
- Height: 4,475 metres (14,682 ft)

Kuntuyuq or Quntuyuq (Quechua kuntu, quntu fragrance, aroma, -yuq a suffix, "the one with a fragrance", Hispanicized spelling Contuyog, Cuntuyog) is an archaeological site with rock paintings on a mountain of the same name in Peru. It lies in the Pasco Region, Daniel Alcides Carrion Province, Chacayan District, in the community of Iskayqucha (Quechua for "two lakes", Hispanicized Iscaycocha), north-west of the lake Allqaqucha. The mountain rises up to 4,475 metres (14,682 ft) above sea level. The archaeological site of Kuntuyuq is situated at a height of about 4,433 metres (14,544 ft).

== See also ==
- Yuraq Mach'ay
