= Flor de Luto =

Mountain in Peru

- Location within Peru

Highest point
- Elevation: 5,529 m (18,140 ft)
- Coordinates: 10°26′16″S 76°45′49″W

Geography
- Location: Huanuco; Peru
- Parent range: Raura, Andes

Flor de Luto, Flor de Loto or Torre de Cristal, is a mountain located in Lauricocha Province in the region of Huanuco in Peru. It has an elevation of 5,529 metres (18,140 ft). It belongs to the Raura mountain range which is part of the Peruvian Andes.
