= Copa District =

Coordinates: 10.3864°S 77.0792°W

Copa Qupa
- District
- Interactive map of Copa
- Country: Peru
- Region: Lima
- Province: Cajatambo
- Founded: January 2, 1857
- Capital: Copa

Government
  - Mayor: Henoch Flores Callupe (2019-2022)

Area
  - Total: 212.16 km^{2} (81.92 sq mi)
- Elevation: 3,410 m (11,190 ft)
- Time zone: UTC-5 (PET)
- UBIGEO: 150302

Copa District is one of five districts of the province Cajatambo in Peru.

== Geography ==
The Huayhuash mountain range traverses the district. Some of the highest mountains are listed below:

- Auxilio
- Jullutahuarco
- Rajucollota
- Rasac
- Sarapo
- Huacrish

== Administrative Division ==
=== Village centres ===
- Urban
  - Copa, with 481 inhabitants.
  - Huayllapa, with 323 inhabitants.
- Rural

== Ethnic groups ==
The people in the province are mainly indigenous citizens of Quechua descent. Quechua is the language 38.52% of the population learnt to speak in childhood, 61.36% of the residents started speaking using the Spanish language (2007 Peru Census).

== See also ==
- Sarapococha
