= Goyllarisquizga District =

Goyllarisquizga
- District
- Interactive map of Goyllarisquizga
- Coordinates: 10°29′38″S 76°24′08″W
- Country: Peru
- Region: Pasco
- Province: Daniel Alcides Carrión
- Founded: November 27, 1944
- Capital: Goyllarisquizga

Government
  - Mayor: Edwin Hector Curi Esteban

Area
  - Total: 23.17 km^{2} (8.95 sq mi)
- Elevation: 4,170 m (13,680 ft)

Population (2005 census)
  - Total: 1,356
  - Density: 58.52/km^{2} (151.6/sq mi)
- Time zone: UTC-5 (PET)
- UBIGEO: 190203

Goyllarisquizga District is one of eight districts of the province Daniel Alcides Carrión in Peru.
