= Warawtampu =

Archaeological site in Peru

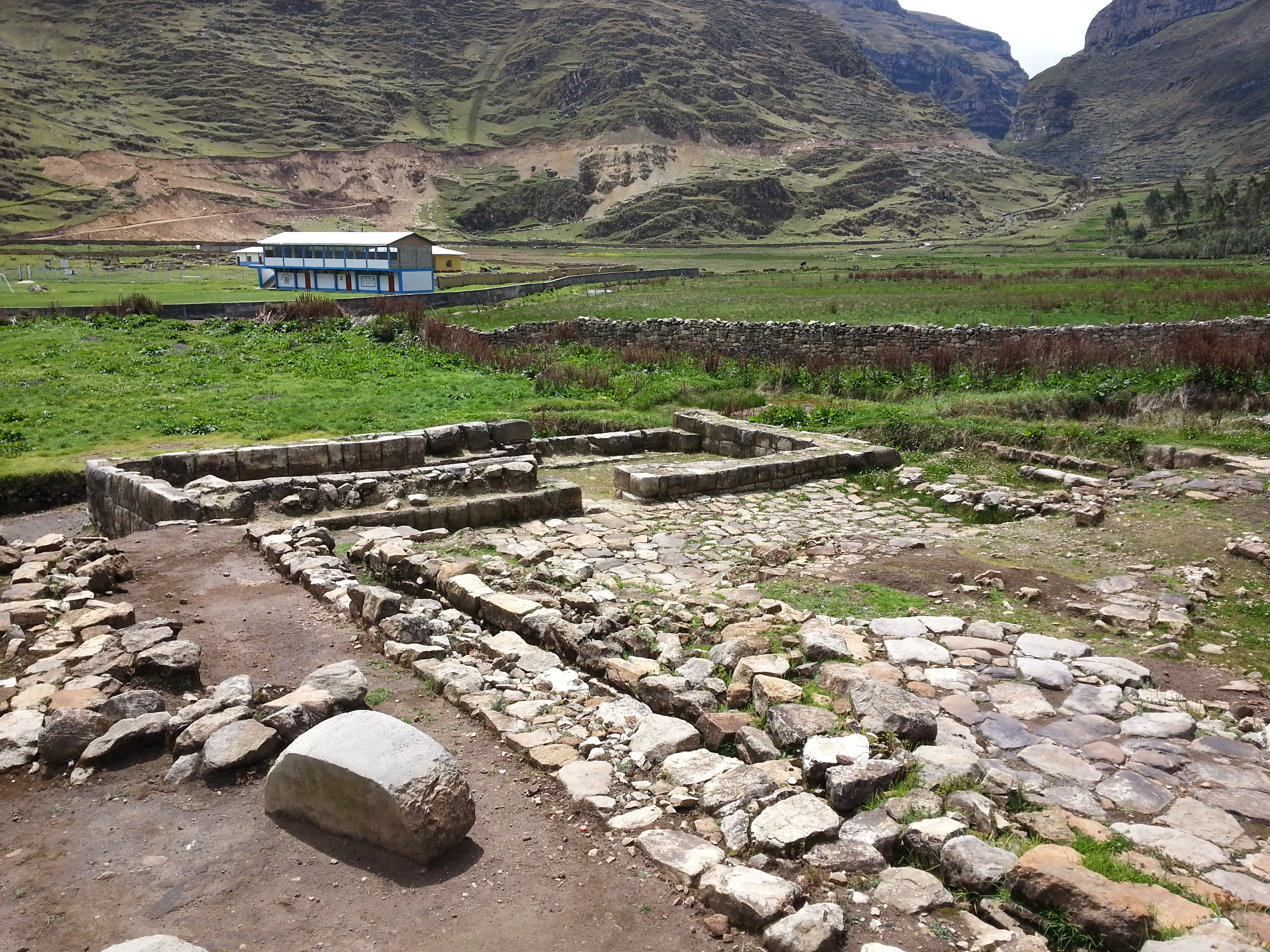
- Warmiwasi, part of the archaeological site of Warawtampu
- Interactive map of Warawtampu
- 10°27′54″S 76°32′12″W
- Cultures: Inca
- Location: Peru
- Region: Pasco Region

Site notes
- Height: 3,624 m (11,890 ft)

Warawtampu (Quechua waraw high and deep, tampu inn, Hispanicized spelling Huarautambo) is an archaeological site in the Pasco Region in Peru. It is located in Daniel Alcides Carrión Province, Yanahuanca District, in the community of the same name. The archaeological site of Astupampa is close to it.

The complex was built during the government of Pachakutiq Inka Yupanki. Some of the most interesting buildings at Warawtampu are Inkawasi ("Inca house"), Warmiwasi ("woman house") and Phaqcha ("waterfall"), an altar for water ceremonies.

== Gallery ==
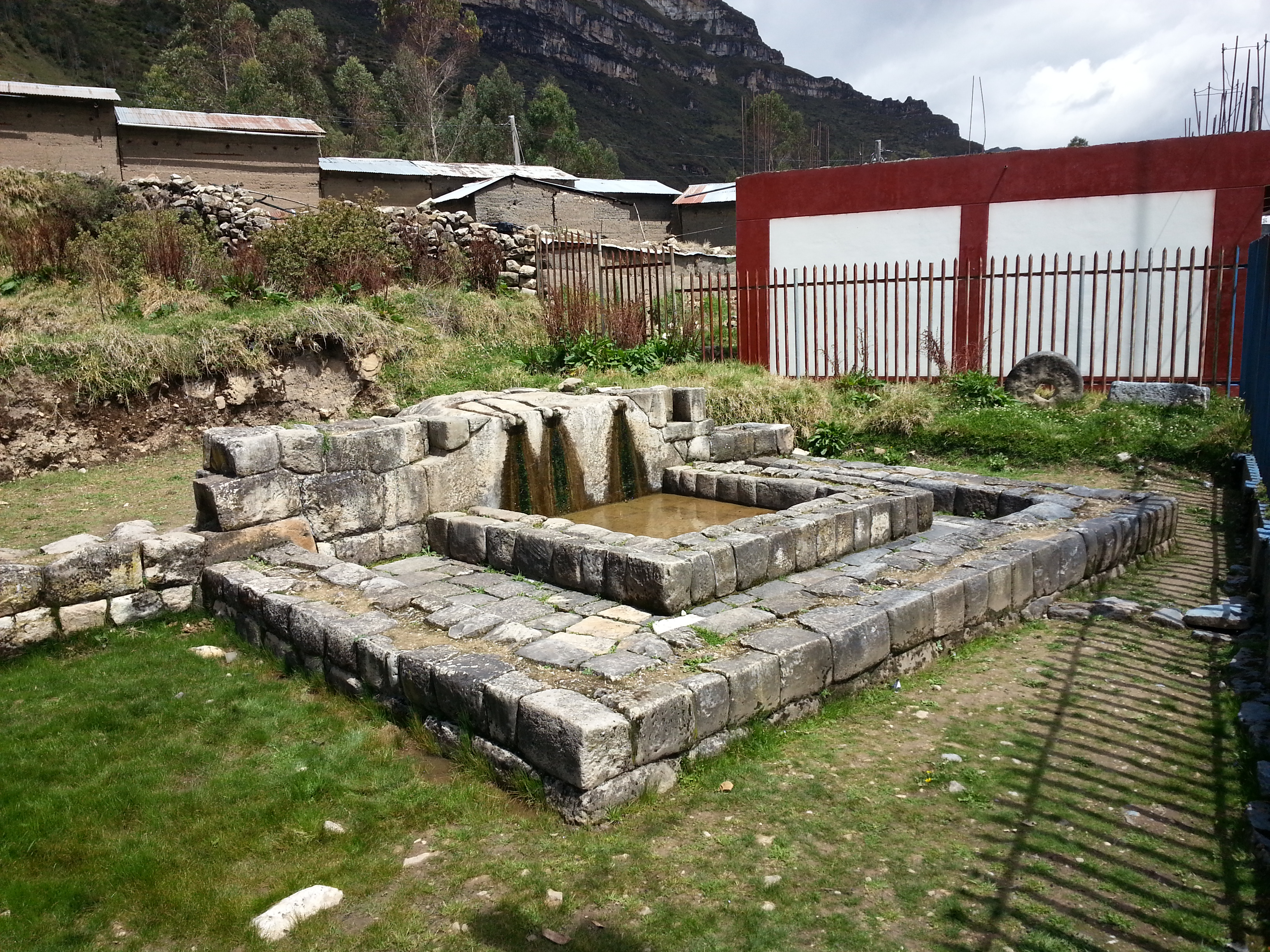
Phaqcha, part of the archaeological site of Warawtampu

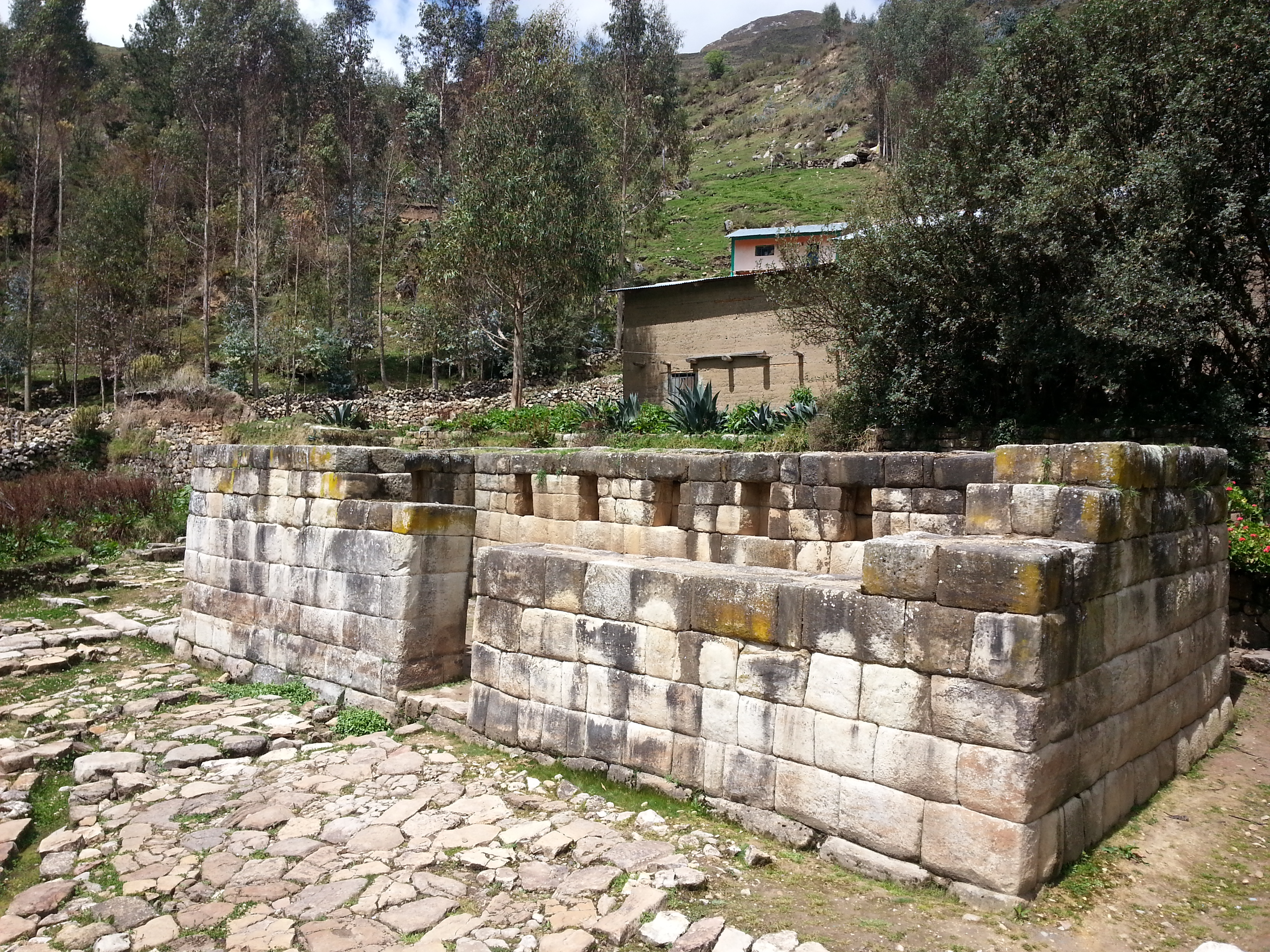
Inkawasi at Warawtampu
