= Paucar District =

Paucar
- District
- Interactive map of Paucar
- Coordinates: 10°20′48″S 76°24′12″W
- Country: Peru
- Region: Pasco
- Province: Daniel Alcides Carrión
- Founded: December 4, 1952
- Capital: Paucar

Government
  - Mayor: Valeriano Chamorro Trinidad

Area
  - Total: 134.18 km^{2} (51.81 sq mi)
- Elevation: 3,350 m (10,990 ft)

Population (2005 census)
  - Total: 2,224
  - Density: 16.57/km^{2} (42.93/sq mi)
- Time zone: UTC-5 (PET)
- UBIGEO: 190204

Paucar District is one of eight districts of the province Daniel Alcides Carrión in Peru.
