= León Huaccanan =

Mountain in Peru

- Location within Peru

Highest point
- Elevation: 5,215 m (17,110 ft)
- Coordinates: 10°23′23″S 76°48′42″W

Geography
- Location: Between the regions of Huanuco and Lima; Peru
- Parent range: Raura, Andes

León Huaccanan, Kuajadajanka or León Dormido is a mountain located on the boundary of the regions of Huanuco and Lima in Peru. Sources list its elevation as 5,215 metres (17,110 ft) or 5,421 metres (17,785 ft). It belongs to the Raura mountain range which is part of the Peruvian Andes.
