= Yuraq Mach'ay =

Archaeological site in Peru

Coordinates: 10.4969°S 76.4181°W

- Interactive map of Yuraq Mach'ay
- Location: Peru, Pasco Region, Daniel Alcides Carrión Province
- Region: Andes

Site notes
- Height: 3,991 metres (13,094 ft)

Yuraq Mach'ay (Quechua yuraq white, mach'ay cave, "white cave", Hispanicized spelling Yuracmachay) is an archaeological site with rock paintings in Peru. It lies in the Pasco Region, Daniel Alcides Carrión Province, Chacayan District. Yuraq Mach'ay is situated at a height of 3,991 metres (13,094 ft) on the slope of Pukara, north of the city of Cerro de Pasco.

== See also ==
- Kuntuyuq
