= Vilcabamba District, Daniel Alcides Carrión =

Vilcabamba
- District
- Interactive map of Vilcabamba
- Coordinates: 10°30′33″S 76°26′18″W
- Country: Peru
- Region: Pasco
- Province: Daniel Alcides Carrión
- Founded: September 6, 1920
- Capital: Vilcabamba

Government
  - Mayor: Emilio Montalvo Vasquez

Area
  - Total: 102.35 km^{2} (39.52 sq mi)
- Elevation: 3,445 m (11,302 ft)

Population (2017)
  - Total: 1,939
  - Density: 18.94/km^{2} (49.07/sq mi)
- Time zone: UTC-5 (PET)
- UBIGEO: 190208

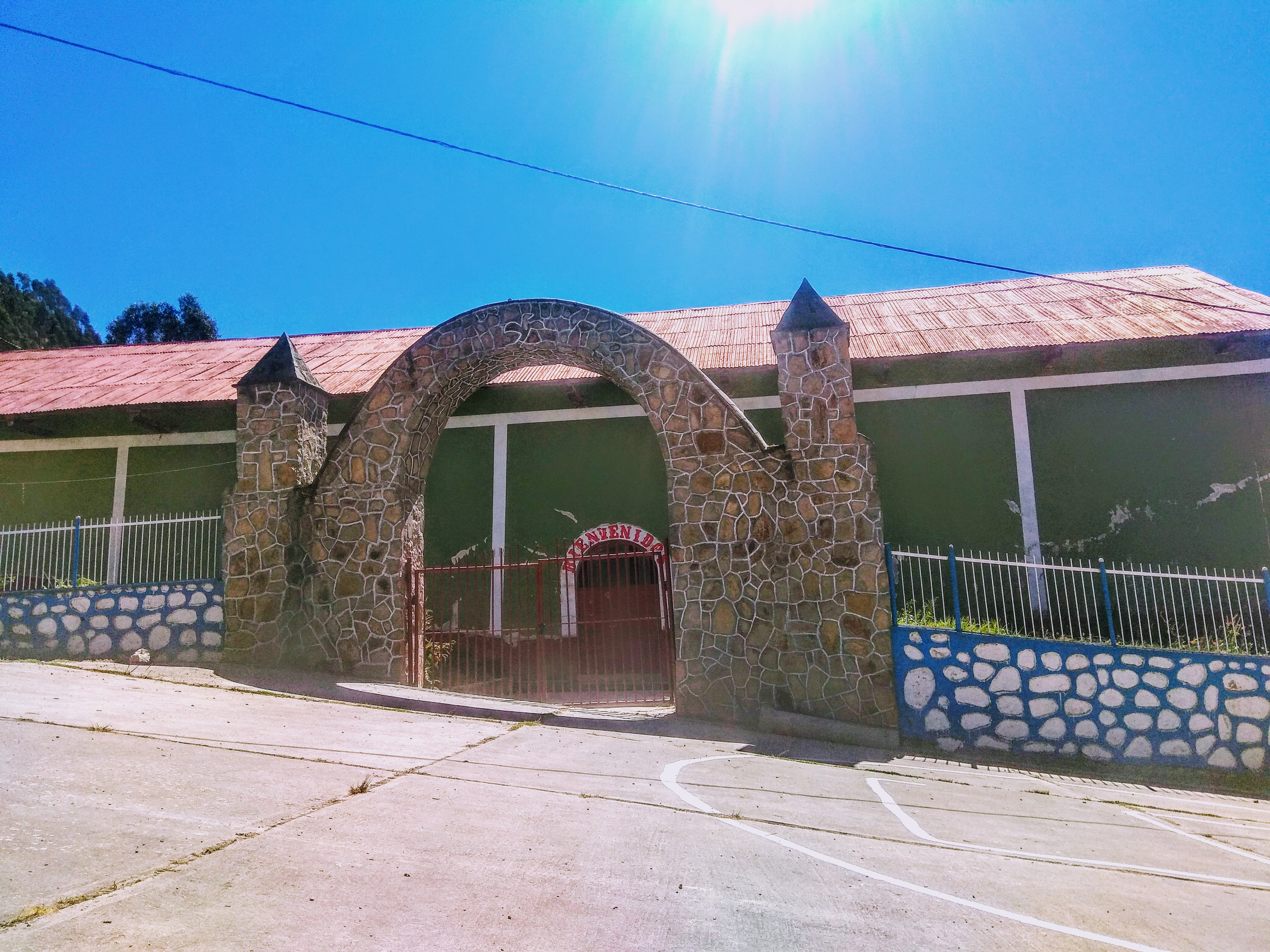

Vilcabamba District is one of eight districts of the province Daniel Alcides Carrión in Peru.
