= Puka Mach'ay (Pasco) =

Mountain in Peru

- Location within Peru

Highest point
- Elevation: 4,600 m (15,100 ft)
- Coordinates: 10°38′28″S 76°36′43″W

Geography
- Location: Peru, Pasco Region
- Parent range: Andes

Puka Mach'ay (Quechua puka red, mach'ay cave, "red cave", also spelled Pucamachay) is a mountain in the Andes of Peru, about 4,600 m (15,100 ft) high. It is located in the Pasco Region, Daniel Alcides Carrión Province, Yanahuanca District. Puka Mach'ay lies northeast of Saqra Mach'ay.
