= Tapuc District =

Tapuc
- District
- Interactive map of Tapuc
- Coordinates: 10°25′30″S 76°28′21″W
- Country: Peru
- Region: Pasco
- Province: Daniel Alcides Carrión
- Founded: January 2, 1857
- Capital: Tapuc

Government
  - Mayor: Javier Yanayaco Aguilar

Area
  - Total: 60.19 km^{2} (23.24 sq mi)
- Elevation: 3,675 m (12,057 ft)

Population (2005 census)
  - Total: 3,309
  - Density: 54.98/km^{2} (142.4/sq mi)
- Time zone: UTC-5 (PET)
- UBIGEO: 190207

Tapuc District is one of eight districts of the province Daniel Alcides Carrión in Peru.
