= Yarupac =

Mountain in Peru

- Caudalosa
- Location within Peru

Highest point
- Elevation: 5,685 m (18,652 ft)
- Coordinates: 10°28′08″S 76°46′26″W

Geography
- Location: Between the regions of Huanuco and Lima; Peru
- Parent range: Raura, Andes

Yarupac or Caudalosa is a mountain located on the boundary of the regions of Huanuco and Lima in Peru. It has an elevation of 5,685 metres (18,652 ft). It belongs to the Raura mountain range which is part of the Peruvian Andes.
