= Siete Caballeros =

Mountain in Peru

- Location within Peru

Highest point
- Elevation: 5,200 m (17,100 ft)
- Coordinates: 10°26′42″S 76°43′22″W

Geography
- Location: Peru, Lima Region, Pasco Region
- Parent range: Andes, Rawra

Siete Caballeros is a mountain in the Raura mountain range in the Andes of Peru with several peaks reaching approximately 5,000 m (16,000 ft) above sea level. It is located in the province of Lauricocha, in the region of Huánuco. Siete Caballeros lies north of Puyhuanccocha.
