= Čule =

- Village
- Location within Bosnia and Herzegovina
- Coordinates: 43°17′51″N 17°45′57″E
- Country: Bosnia and Herzegovina
- Entity: Federation of Bosnia and Herzegovina
- Canton: Herzegovina-Neretva
- Municipality: Mostar

Area
  - Total: 3.05 sq mi (7.89 km^{2})

Population (2013)
  - Total: 387
  - Density: 127/sq mi (49.0/km^{2})
- Time zone: UTC+1 (CET)
  - Summer (DST): UTC+2 (CEST)
- Postal code: 88000 (Same as Mostar)
- Area code: (+387) 36 345

Čule is a populated settlement in the Mostar municipality, Herzegovina-Neretva Canton, Federation of Bosnia and Herzegovina, Bosnia and Herzegovina. It is situated southwest of the city of Mostar along the R424 road.

== Landmarks ==
The village contains the bagel shop Pekara Čula and the Svadbeni salon Luna, a venue that is used for weddings. The Catholic church of Crkva svetog Ilije proroka lies to the west in Selište.

== Demographics ==
According to the 2013 census, its population was 387, all Croats.
