= Saqra Mach'ay (Pasco) =

Mountain in Peru

- Location within Peru

Highest point
- Elevation: 4,600 m (15,100 ft)
- Coordinates: 10°38′43″S 76°37′05″W

Geography
- Location: Peru, Pasco Region
- Parent range: Andes

Saqra Mach'ay (Quechua saqra malignant, pernicious, bad, bad tempered, wicked; restless; devil, synonym of supay, mach'ay cave, hispanicized spelling Sagramachay) is a mountain in the Andes of Peru, about 4,600 m (15,100 ft) high. It is located in the Pasco Region, Daniel Alcides Carrión Province, Yanahuanca District. Saqra Mach'ay lies southwest of Puka Mach'ay ("red cave").
