= Pukamayu (Peru) =

- Etymology: Quechua

Location
- Country: Peru
- Region: Pasco Region

Physical characteristics
- Mouth: Chawpiwaranqa

Basin features
- Tributaries
  - left: Chachaq
  - right: Ranrakancha, Yuraqyaku

Pukamayu (Quechua puka red, mayu river, "red river", hispanicized spelling Pucamayo) or Antachaka (Quechua anta copper chaka bridge, "copper bridge", hispanicized Andachaca) is a river in the Daniel Alcides Carrión Province of the Pasco Region in Peru. It belongs to the watershed of the Huallaga River.

Pukamayu originates near the lakes Qiwllaqucha (Quiulacocha) and Karpakancha (Carpacancha) in the south of the province. Its direction is mainly to the northwest. The river gets waters from little streams like Yuraq Yaku (Yuracyacu), Chachaq (Chachac) and Ranra Kancha (Ranracancha). Near Chinchi Tinku (Chinche Tingo) Pukamayu meets the Río Blanco (Spanish for "white river") coming from the west. This is where the river Chawpi Waranqa (Quechua chawpi center, middle, waranqa one thousand, hispanicized Chaupihuaranga) originates. Chawpi Waranqa is an affluent of the Huallaga River.
