= Yana Uqhu (Pasco) =

Mountain in Peru

- Location within Peru

Highest point
- Elevation: 5,000 m (16,000 ft)
- Coordinates: 10°33′21″S 76°42′27″W

Geography
- Location: Peru, Pasco Region
- Parent range: Andes

Yana Uqhu (Quechua yana black, uqhu swamp, "black swamp", Hispanicized spelling Yanaoco) is a mountain in the Andes of Peru, about 5,000 metres (16,404 ft) high. It is located in the Pasco Region, Daniel Alcides Carrión Province, Yanahuanca District, near the border with the Lima Region. The lake southwest of Yana Uqhu is Mituqucha ("mud lake", Hispanicized Mitococha).
