= List of mountains in Peru =

== Peaks above 6,000 metres ==
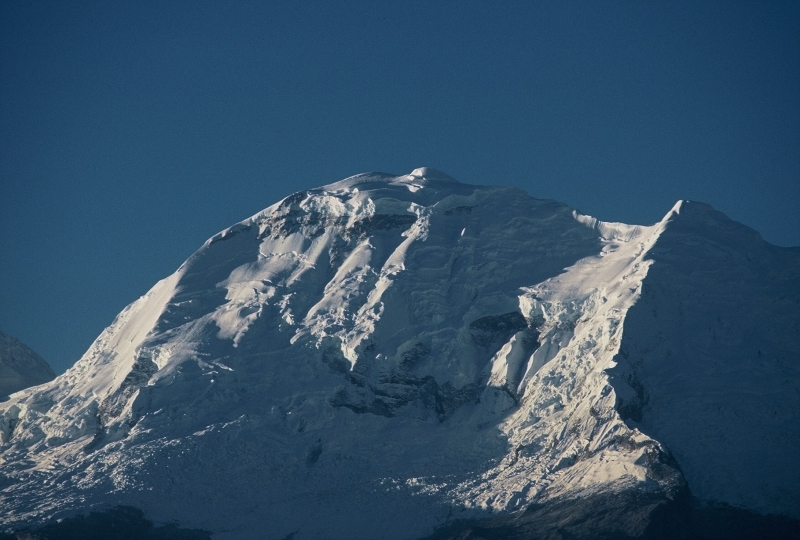
Huascarán Sur

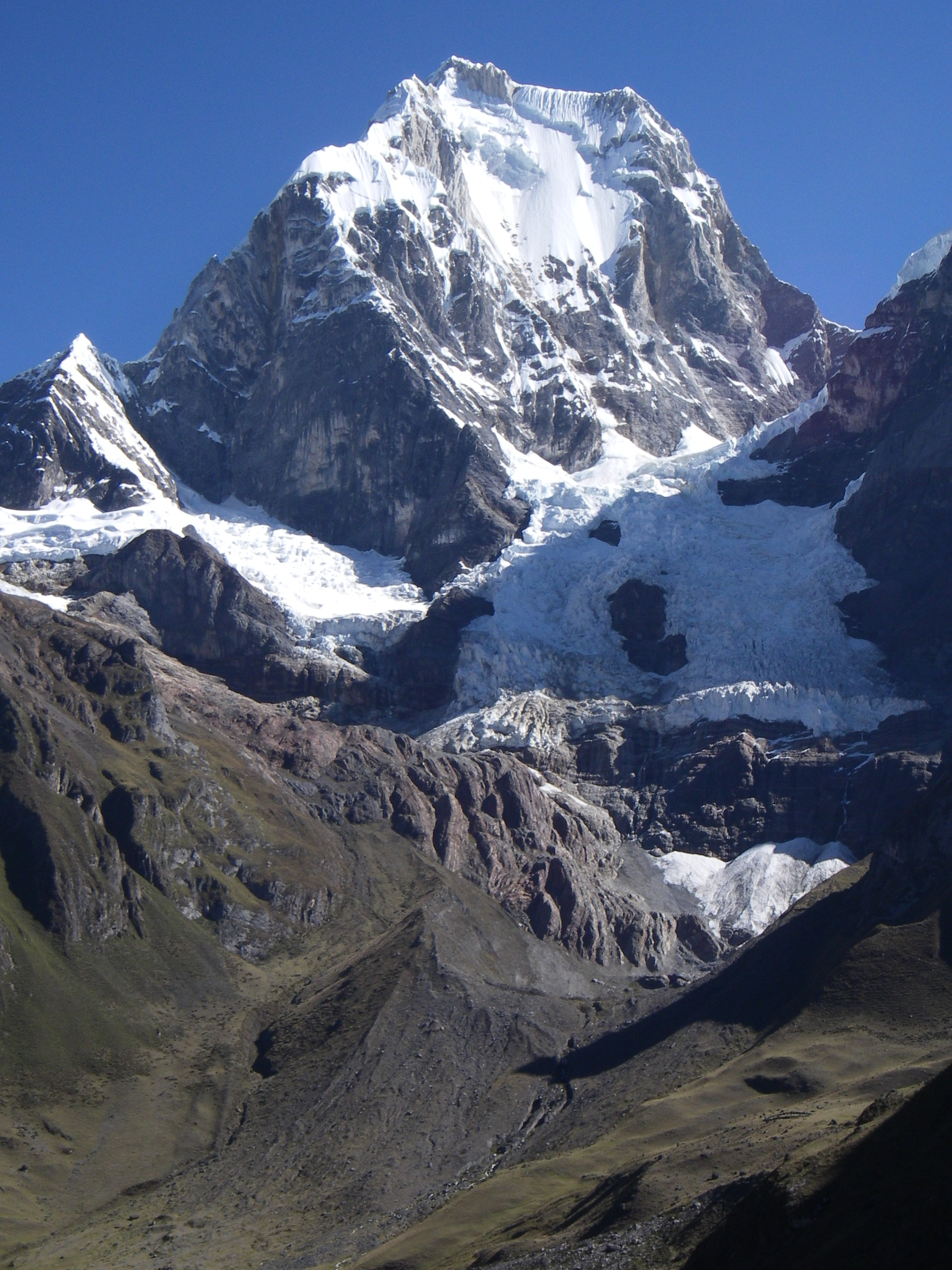
Yerupajá

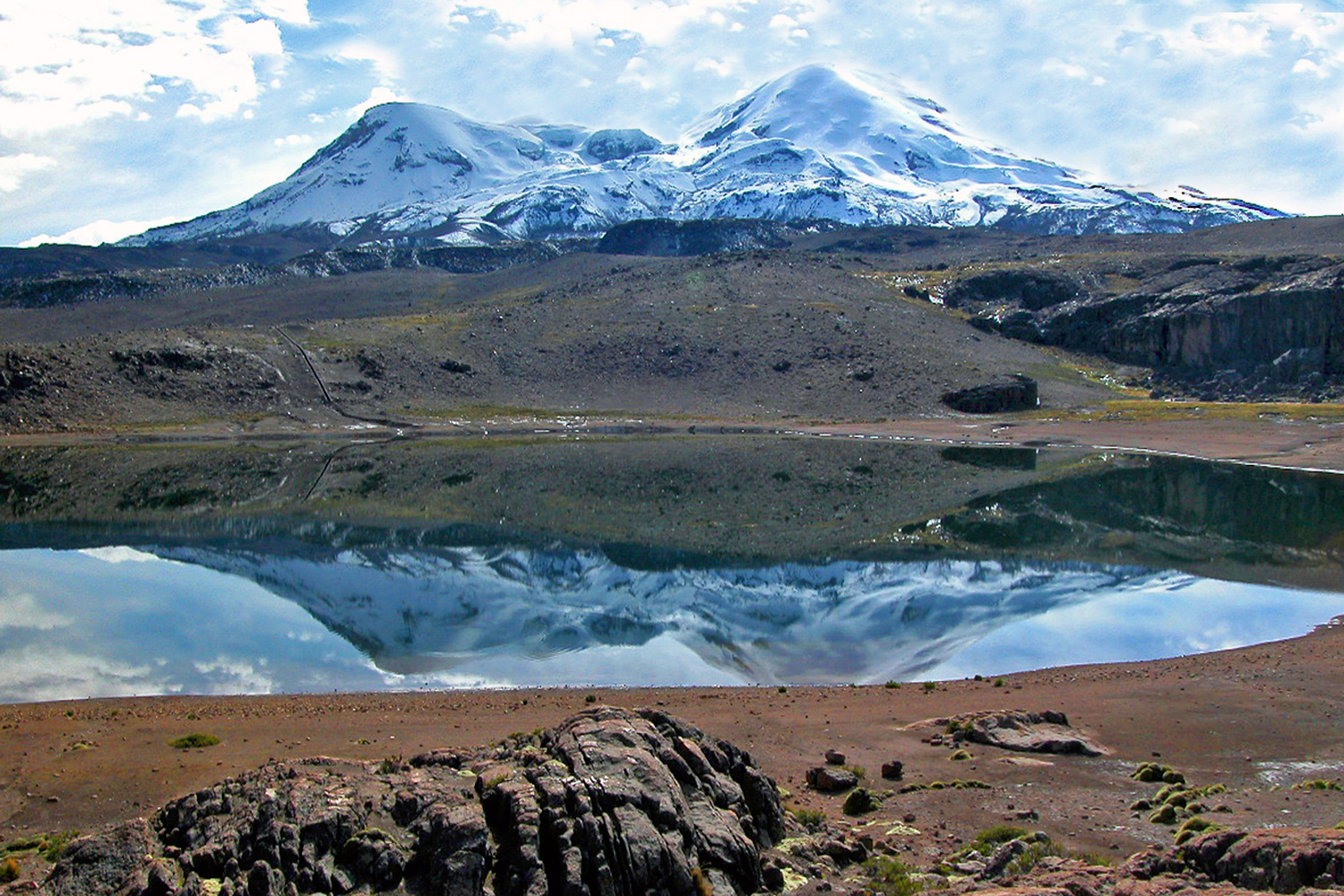
Coropuna

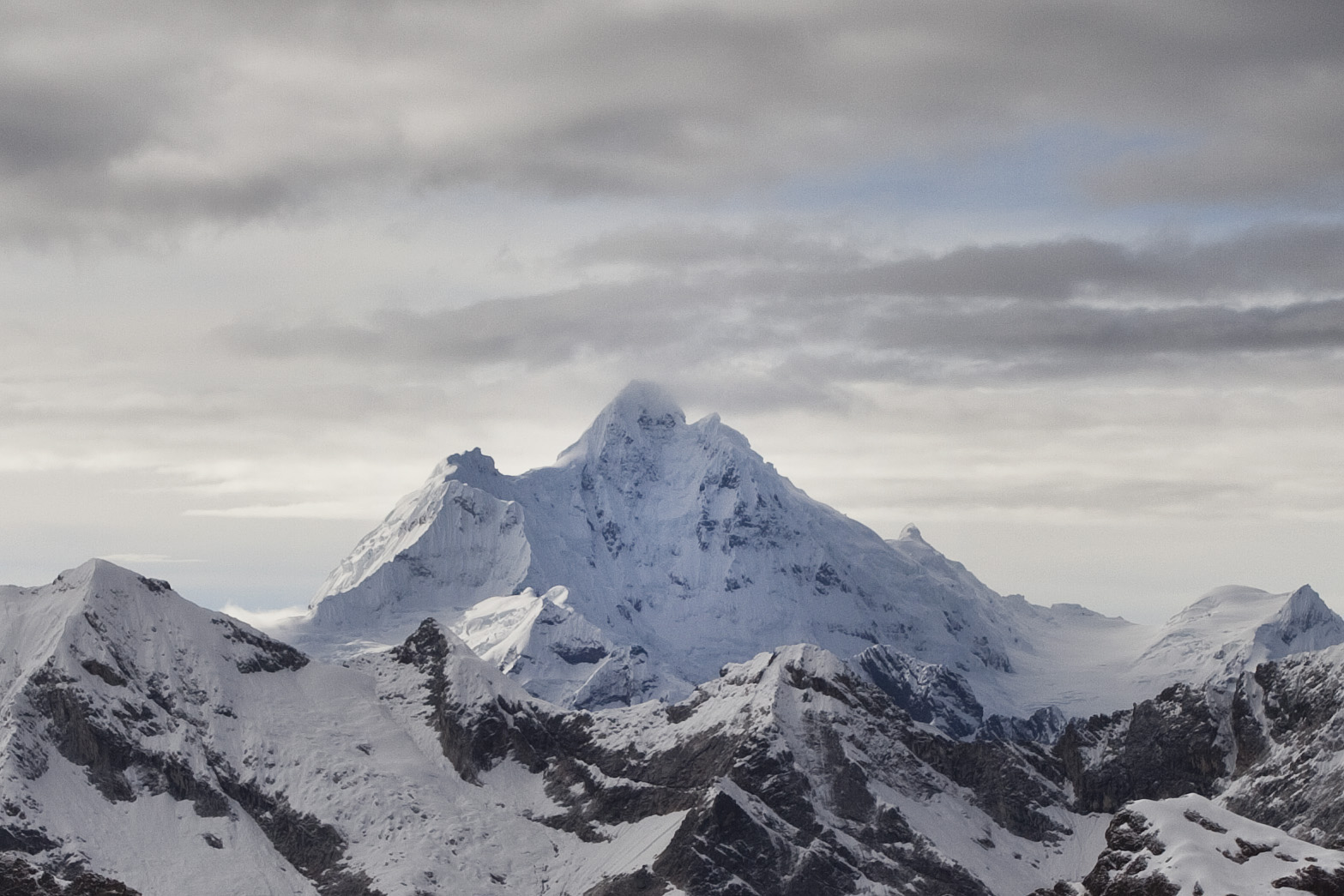
Huantsan

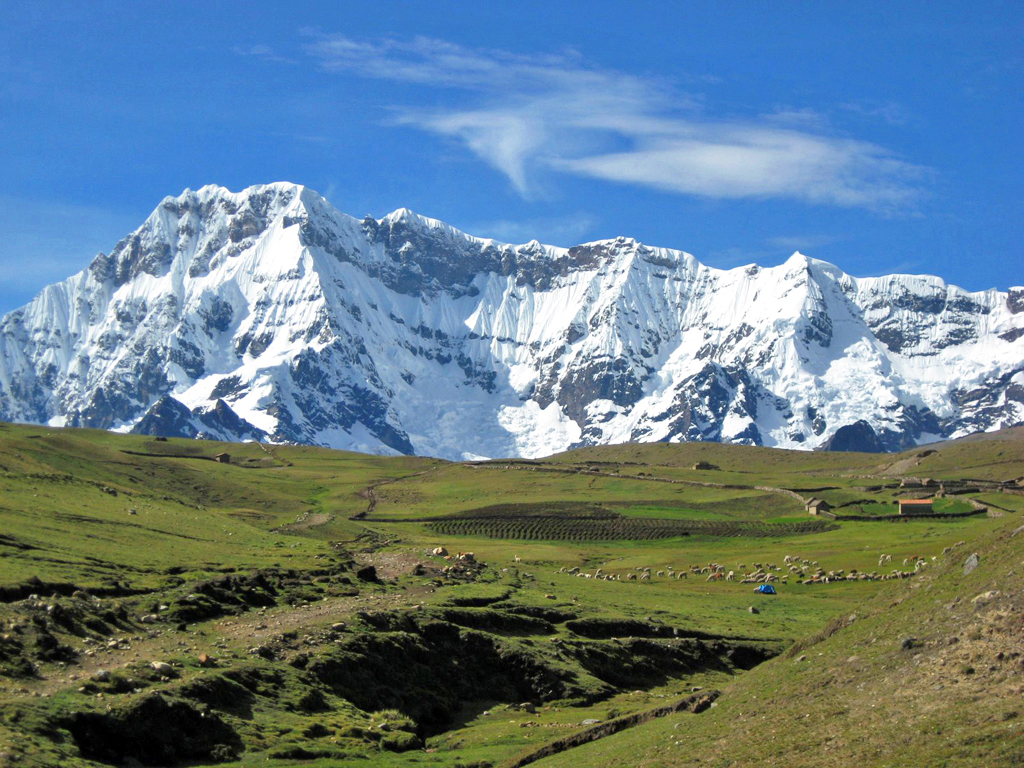
Ausangate

This is a list of the thirty-seven 6000 metre peaks in Peru as defined by a regain height, or prominence, above a col of 300m or more. This list is taken from the full set of Peruvian IGM maps alongside various climbing and mountaineering records. Heights are taken from the Peruvian IGM 1:100,000 series maps with the OEAV survey maps of the Cordillera Blanca (north and south) used where the IGM maps do not give spot heights. SRTM data has been used in a few places to confirm these heights, but due to the steep terrain is often unusable

Mountain	Elevation (metres)	Region	Mountain range
Huascarán S	6,768	Ancash	Cordillera Blanca
Huascarán N	6,655	Ancash	Cordillera Blanca
Yerupajá	6,617	Ancash	Cordillera Huayhuash
Coropuna	6,425	Arequipa	Cordillera Occidental
Huandoy	6,395	Ancash	Cordillera Blanca
Coropuna Casulla	6,377	Arequipa	Cordillera Occidental
Ausangate	6,372	Cusco	Cordillera Vilcanota
Huantsan (Tunshu)	6,369	Ancash	Cordillera Blanca
Chopicalqui	6,345	Ancash	Cordillera Blanca
Siula Grande	6,344	Lima-Huánuco	Cordillera Huayhuash
Chinchey (Rurichinchay)	6,222	Ancash	Cordillera Blanca
Coropuna E	6,305	Arequipa	Cordillera Occidental
Ampato	6,288	Arequipa	Cordillera Occidental
Palcaraju	6,274	Ancash	Cordillera Blanca
Salcantay	6,271	Cusco	Cordillera Vilcabamba
Santa Cruz	6,241	Ancash	Cordillera Blanca
Copa	6,188	Ancash	Cordillera Blanca
Ranrapalca	6,162	Ancash	Cordillera Blanca
Huandoy S	6,160	Ancash	Cordillera Blanca
Pucaranra	6,156	Ancash	Cordillera Blanca
Hualcán (Rahupakinan)	6,122	Ancash	Cordillera Blanca
Yerupaja Chico	6,121	Ancash	Cordillera Huayhuash
Callangate (a.k.a. Qullpa Ananta, Cayangate or Chimboya)	6,110	Cusco	Cordillera Vilcanota
Chacraraju	6,108	Ancash	Cordillera Blanca
Chumpe (a.k.a. Hatunrit'i, Ñañaluma, Wisk'achani, Yanaluma)	6,106	Cusco	Cordillera Vilcanota
Alcamarinayoc (a.k.a. Qullqi Cruz)	6,102	Cusco	Cordillera Vilcanota
Jirishanca	6,094	Ancash-Huánuco	Cordillera Huayhuash
Hatunuma (Pico Tres)	6,093	Cusco	Cordillera Vilcanota
Solimana	6,093	Arequipa	Cordillera Occidental
Chachani	6,057	Arequipa	Cordillera Occidental
Yayamari (Montura)	6,049	Cusco	Cordillera Vilcanota
Pucajirca	6,046	Ancash	Cordillera Blanca
Chaupi Orco	6,044	Puno- Bolivia	Cordillera Apolobamba
Quitaraju	6,036	Ancash	Cordillera Blanca
Tocllaraju	6,034	Ancash	Cordillera Blanca
Hualca Hualca	6,025	Arequipa	Cordillera Occidental
Caraz	6,025	Ancash	Cordillera Blanca

== Peaks less than 6000m ==
Many peaks in Peru frequently quoted as being over 6000m are under this height according to the most recent surveys published by the Peruvian IGM. These peaks include:- Pumasillo 5,991m, Lasunayoc 5,936m, Yanarahu 5,954m, Artesonraju 5,999m, Sabancaya 5,976m, Palumani 5,723m, Sara Sara 5,505m, Helancoma 5,367m.

== Sub-peaks with less than 300m re-ascent ==
Other 6,000 m peaks which are often defined as individual peaks but which have less than 300 m of re-ascent or prominence, include:- Huandoy W 6,342 m (prominence between 200-250m), Sarapu 6,127 (prominence between 180-230m), Callangate North 6,000 m (less than 295m prominence).

Qaras E (6025m) and Rasac (6,017 m) may or may not have 300m prominence. There is insufficient data on the relevant Peruvian IGM maps.

== Mountain ranges ==
Peru is home to a number of mountain ranges, including the following:

- Chila mountain range
- Chonta mountain range
- Cordillera del Cóndor
- Cordillera Apolobamba
- Cordillera Blanca
- Cordillera Carabaya
- Cordillera Central (Peru)
- Cordillera de Rentema
- Cordillera Huayhuash
- Cordillera Negra
- Cordillera Occidental (Peru)
- Cordillera Oriental (Peru)
- Cordillera Vilcanota
- Huaguruncho mountain range
- Huallanca mountain range
- Huanzo mountain range
- Huaytapallana mountain range
- La Raya mountain range
- Pariacaca mountain range
- Puwaq Hanka mountain range
- Raura mountain range
- Serra do Divisor
- Urubamba mountain range
- Vilcabamba mountain range

== See also ==
- Geography of Peru
