= Cule (surname) =

Cule is a surname. Notable people with the surname include:

- John Cule (1920–2015), Welsh physician and psychiatrist
- W. E. Cule (1870–1944), British author
