= Auxilio =

Mountain in Peru

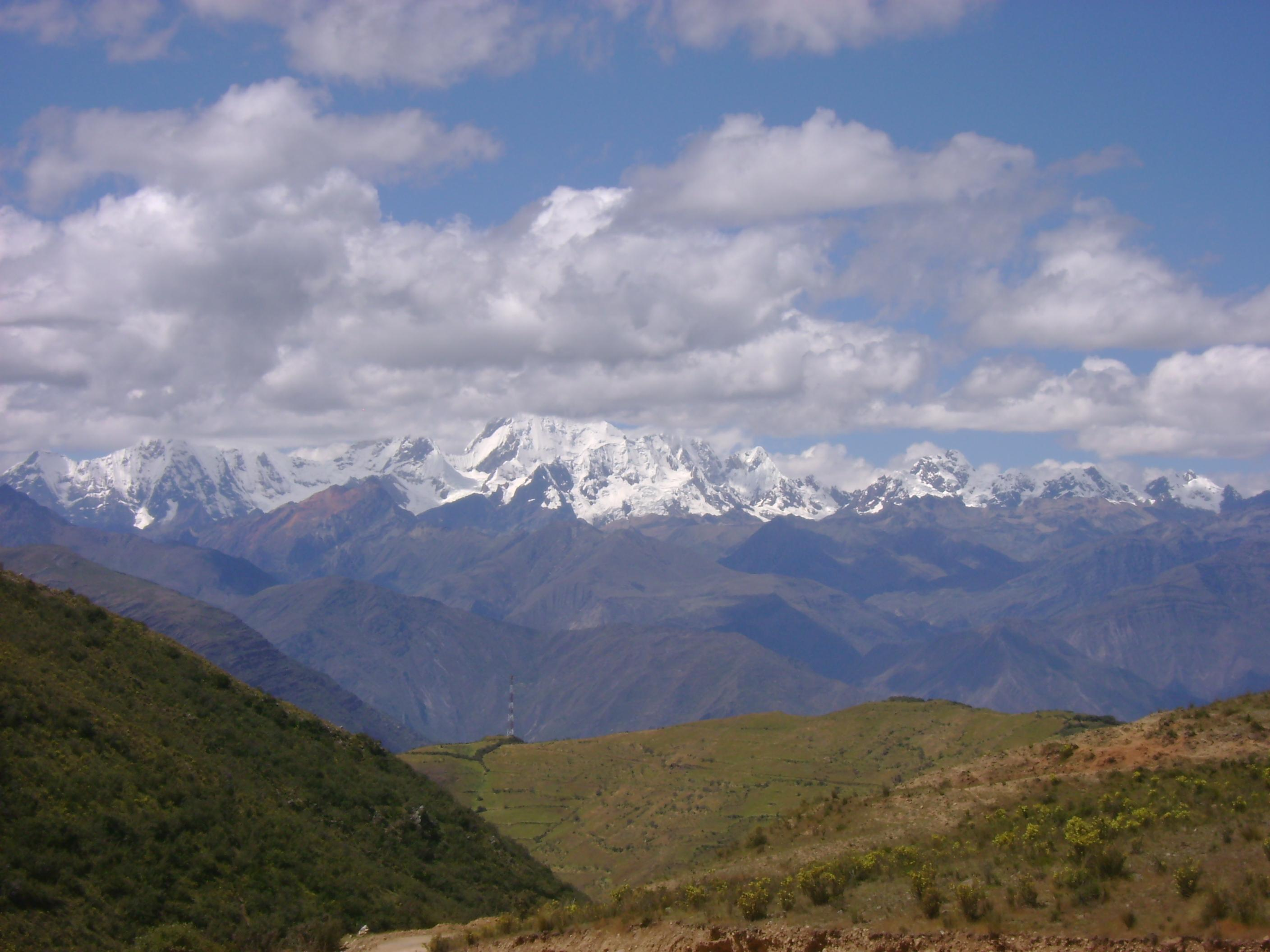
- Huayhuash mountain range with Yerupaja (center-left) and the sub-range west of it (on the right) with Huacrish and Auxilio

Highest point
- Elevation: 5,560 m (18,240 ft)
- Listing: List of mountains in Peru
- Coordinates: 10°18′20″S 76°57′55″W

Naming
- Language of name: Quechua

Geography
- Location within Peru
- Location: Peru, Ancash Region, Lima Region
- Parent range: Andes, Huayhuash

Auxilio (possibly from Quechua Awkillu word for apu (Andean mountain deity) or grandfather, old man, the Hispanicized spelling is the misleading word Auxilio which means "assistance" or "support") is a mountain in the west of the Huayhuash mountain range in the Andes of Peru, about 5,560 metres (18,241 ft) high. It is located in the Ancash Region, Bolognesi Province, Pacllon District, and in the Lima Region, Cajatambo Province, Copa District. Auxilio lies on the sub-range west of Yerupaja, south of Auxilio Lake and southwest of the mountain Huacrish.

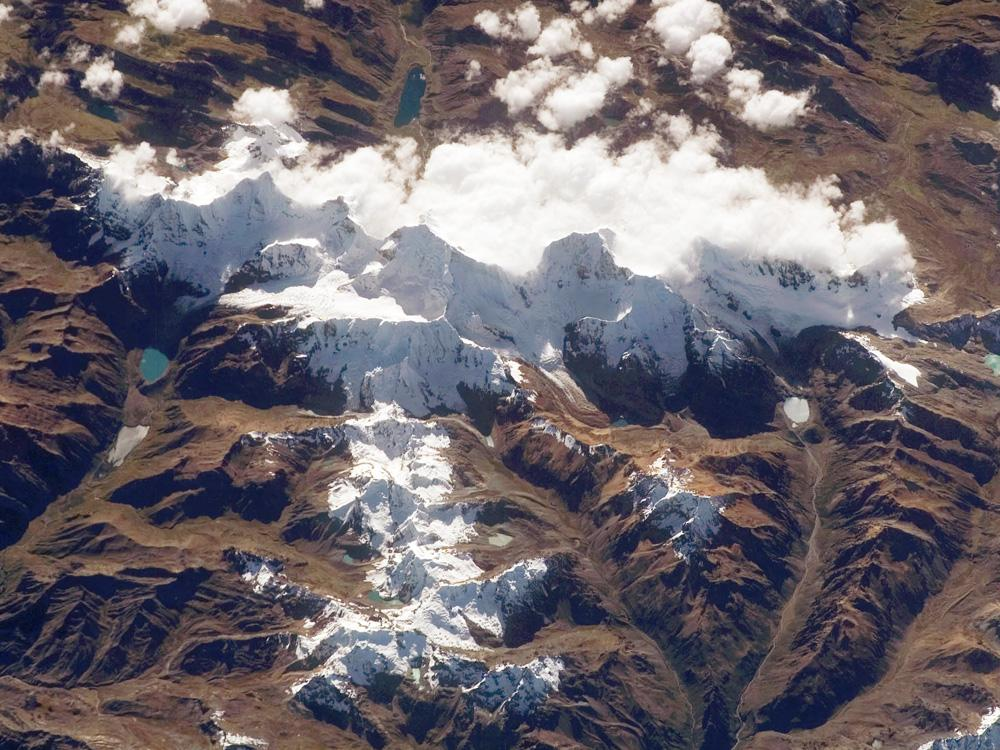
Huayhuash mountain range from space, looking to the east. Yerupaja and Siula Grande are in the centre. Auxilio lies on the sub-range in the foreground.
