= Cordillera de Rentema =

Mountains in Peru

The Cordillera de Rentema (Spanish: Rentema mountain range) in Peru is formed by the summits of the Yactan, Naranjos, El Arenal, Picuy, Cumbe and Los Patos hills.

== See also ==
- Pongo de Rentema
