= Chuspe =

Mountain in Peru

- Location within Peru

Highest point
- Elevation: 5,000 m (16,000 ft)
- Coordinates: 10°31′00″S 76°43′24″W

Geography
- Location: Peru, Lima Region, Pasco Region
- Parent range: Andes, Raura

Chuspe (possibly from Quechua for insect, generic name of flies or two-winged insects; fly) is a mountain in the Raura mountain range in the Andes of Peru whose summit reaches an elevation of approximately 5,000 m (16,000 ft). It is located in the boundary between the regions of Lima and Pasco. Chuspe lies north of Cushuropata.
