= Cule =

Mountain located on the boundary of the regions of Huanuco and Lima in Peru

- Kuli, Rumiwain
- Location within Peru

Highest point
- Elevation: 5,080 m (16,670 ft)
- Coordinates: 10°26′11″S 76°47′33″W

Geography
- Location: Between the regions of Huanuco and Lima; Peru
- Parent range: Raura, Andes

Cule, Kuli or Rumiwain is a mountain located on the boundary of the regions of Huanuco and Lima in Peru. It has an elevation of 5,580 metres (18,307 ft). It belongs to the Raura mountain range which is part of the Peruvian Andes.
