= Santa Rosa (mountain) =

Mountain in Peru

- Location within Peru

Highest point
- Elevation: 5,655 m (18,553 ft)
- Coordinates: 10°29′7.45″S 76°43′34.90″W

Geography
- Location: Limit of the regions of Huanuco, Lima, Huanuco; Peru
- Parent range: Raura, Andes

Santa Rosa is a mountain located in the limits of the regions of Huanuco, Lima and Pasco in Peru. With an elevation of 5,655 metres (18,553 ft), it is the second tallest peak of Raura Range which is part of the Peruvian Andes.
