= Yana Chaka (Pasco) =

Mountain in Peru

- Location within Peru

Highest point
- Elevation: 5,000 m (16,000 ft)
- Coordinates: 10°34′09″S 76°40′21″W

Geography
- Location: Peru, Pasco Region
- Parent range: Andes

Yana Chaka (Quechua yana black, chaka bridge, "black bridge", hispanicized spelling Yanachaca) is a mountain in the Andes of Peru whose summit reaches about 5,000 m (16,404 ft) above sea level. It is located in the Pasco Region, Daniel Alcides Carrión Province, Yanahuanca District, west of a lake named Atalaya.
