= Selište, Mostar =

Selište
- Village
- Location within Bosnia and Herzegovina
- Coordinates: 43.283°N 17.751°E
- Country: Bosnia and Herzegovina
- Entity: Federation of Bosnia and Herzegovina
- Canton: Herzegovina-Neretva
- Municipality: City of Mostar

Area
  - Total: 1.15 sq mi (2.97 km^{2})

Population (2013)
  - Total: 172
  - Density: 150/sq mi (57.9/km^{2})
- Time zone: UTC+1 (CET)
  - Summer (DST): UTC+2 (CEST)
- Postal code: 88000 (Same as Mostar)
- Area code: (+387) 36 345

Selište is a village in the City of Mostar, Bosnia and Herzegovina.

== Demographics ==
According to the 2013 census, its population was 172, all Croats.

== Landmarks ==
- Nekropola Šamatorje (Vinina), one of the largest necropolis of stećci in the Mostar region.
