= Huacrish =

Mountain in Peru

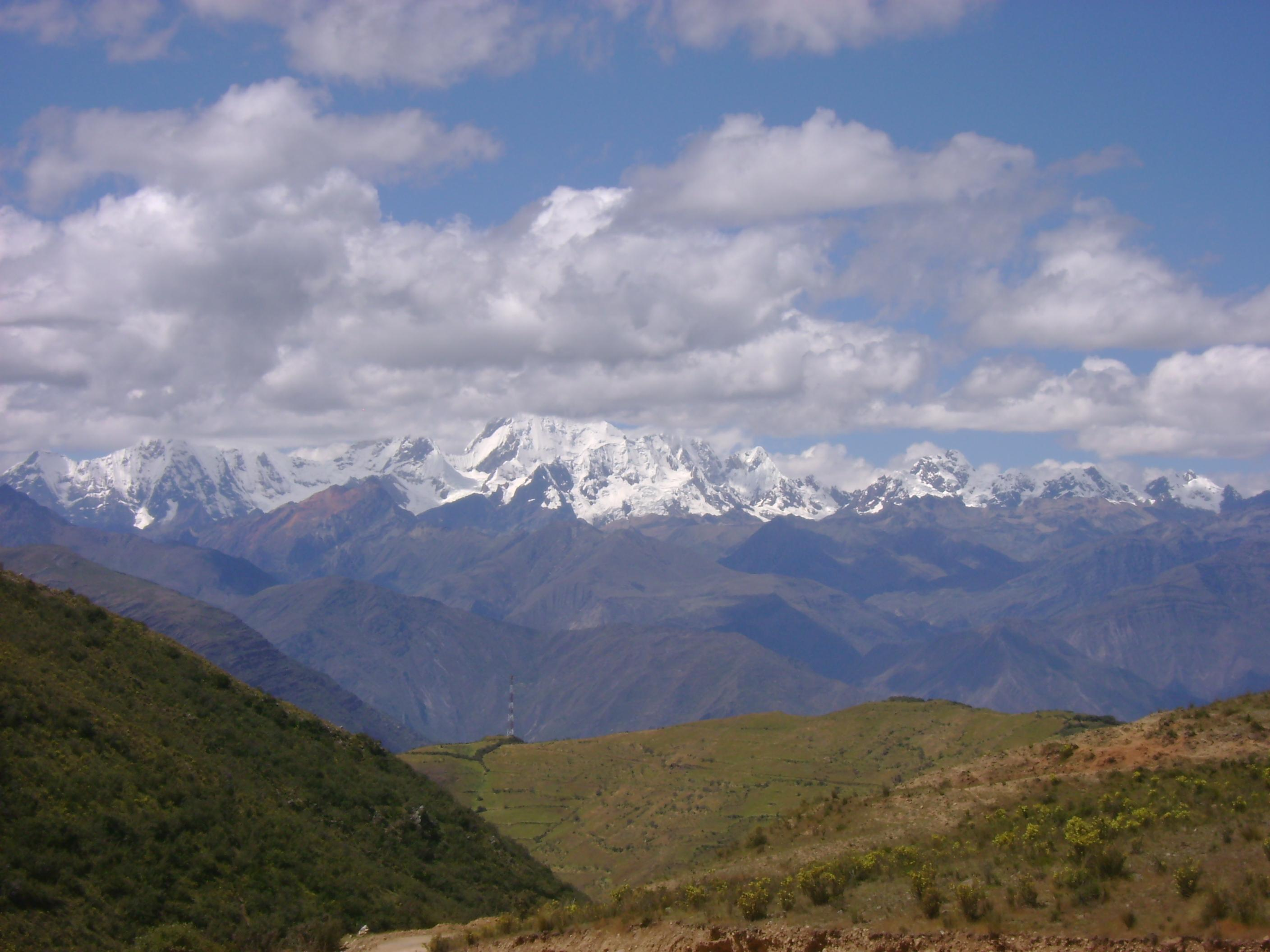
- Huayhuash mountain range with Yerupaja (center-left) and the sub-range west of it (on the right) including Huacrish and Auxilio.

Highest point
- Elevation: 5,622 m (18,445 ft)
- Listing: List of mountains in Peru
- Coordinates: 10°17′55″S 76°57′50″W

Naming
- Language of name: Quechua

Geography
- Location within Peru
- Location: Peru, Ancash Region, Lima Region
- Parent range: Andes, Huayhuash

Huacrish (possibly from Quechua Wakrish (from wakri) for "flash of lightning") is a mountain in the west of the Huayhuash mountain range in the Andes of Peru, about 5,622 metres (18,445 ft) high. It is located in the Ancash Region, Bolognesi Province, Pacllon District, and in the Lima Region, Cajatambo Province, Copa District. Huacrish lies on the sub-range west of Yerupaja, northeast of the mountain Auxilio and southeast of the Auxilio Lake.

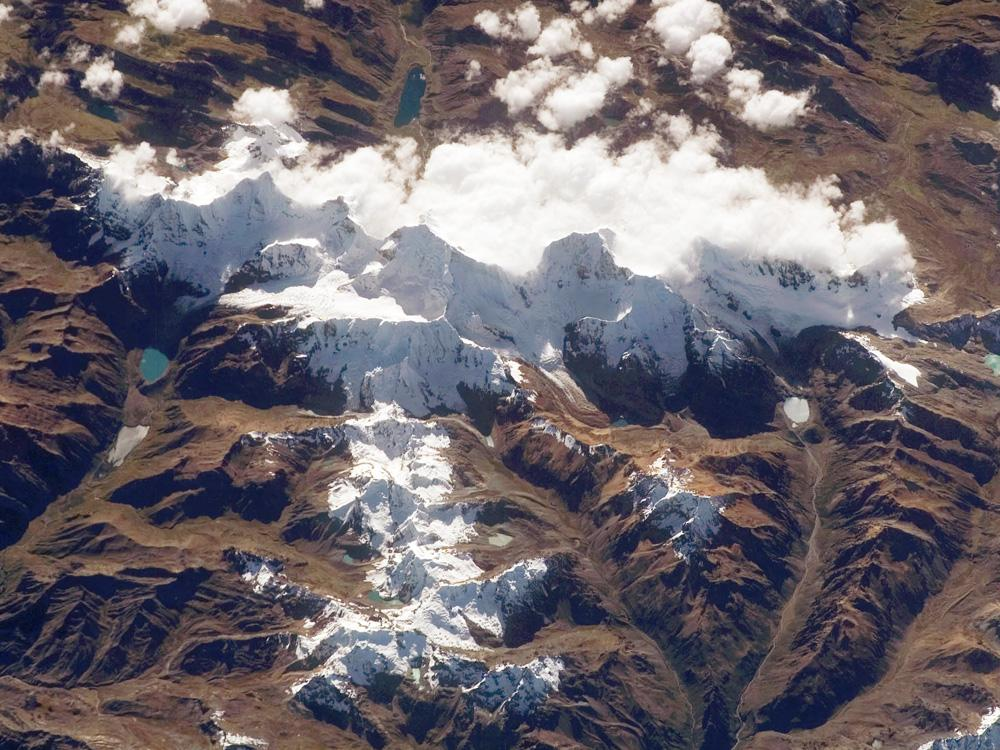
Huayhuash mountain range from space, looking to the northeast. Yerupaja and Siula Grande are in the centre. Huacrish lies about in the middle of the sub-range in the foreground.
