= Chacraccocha =

Mountain in Peru

- Location within Peru

Highest point
- Elevation: 5,000 m (16,000 ft)
- Coordinates: 10°27′13″S 76°41′53″W

Geography
- Location: Peru, Pasco Region
- Parent range: Andes, Raura

Chacraccocha (possibly from Quechua chakra field, qucha lake, "field lake") is a mountain in the Raura mountain range in the Andes of Peru, about 5,000 m (16,000 ft) high. It is located in the boundary between the regions of Huánuco and in Pasco.

The lake named Chacracocha lies northeast of the mountain at 10°26′49″S 76°40′45″W.
