= Cordillera Occidental (Peru) =

Mountain range in the Peruvian Andes

Coordinates: 14°00′S 74°00′W

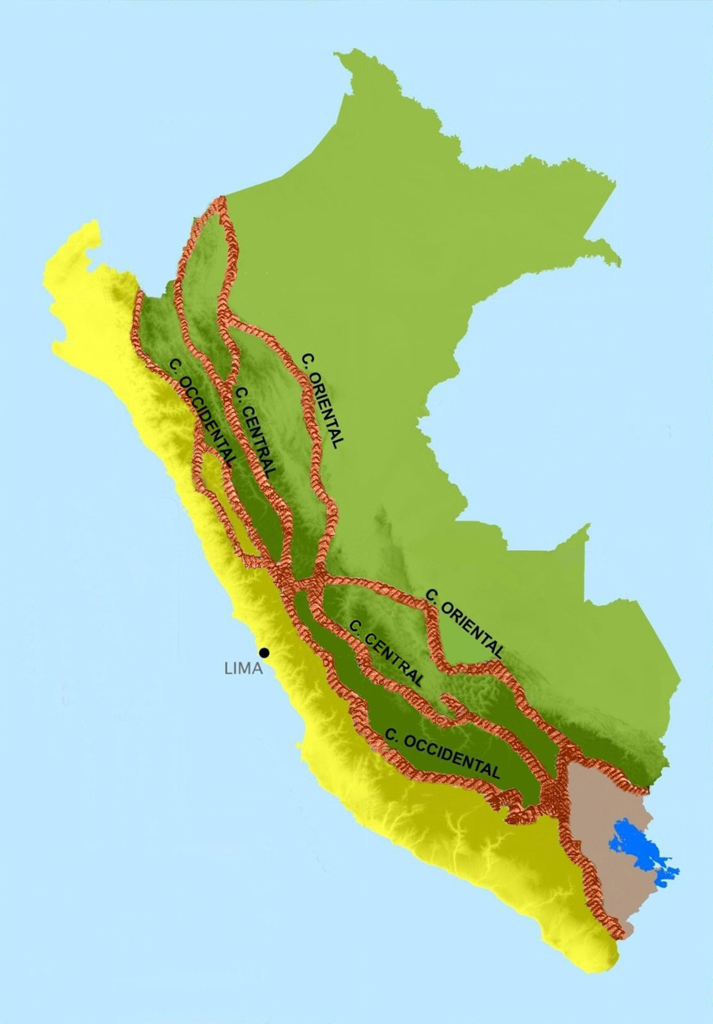
Map of Peru and its codilleras.

In Peru the Cordillera Occidental is the western branch of the Andes. It bounds to the west with coastal plains or falls directly into the Pacific along cliffed coasts. To the east of Cordillera Occidental lies the Cordillera Central and the Cordillera Oriental of Peru. As with other parts of the Peruvian Andes the Cordillera Occedental bears evidence on the Andean orogeny.

Subranges include Cordillera Blanca, Cordillera Negra and Cordillera Huayhuash.
