= Raura mountain range =

Mountain range in Peru

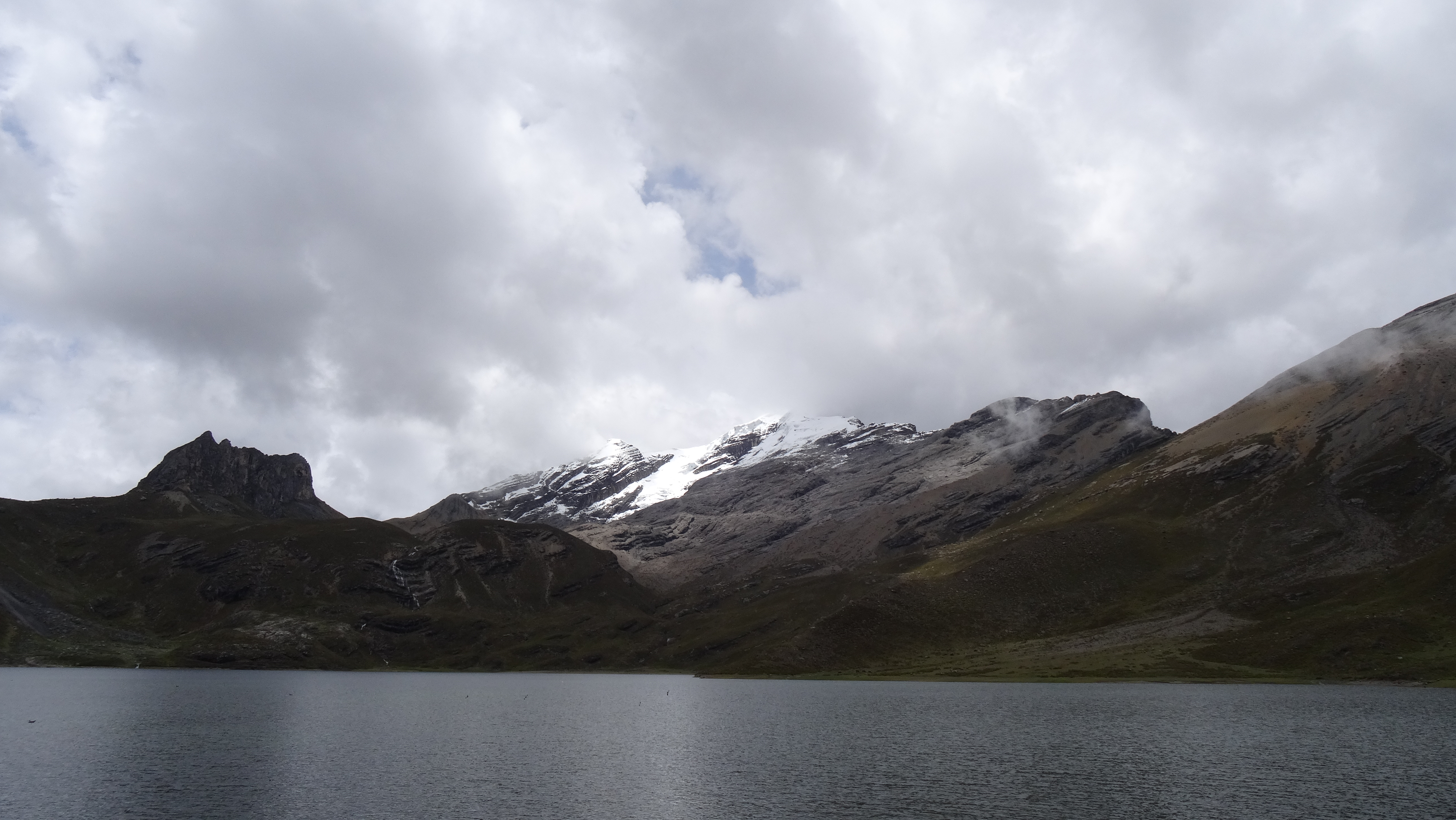

Highest point
- Peak: Yarupac
- Elevation: 5,685 m (18,652 ft)

Dimensions
- Length: 20 km (12 mi) N-S

Geography
- Location within Peru
- Country: Peru
- Region(s): Huánuco, Lima, Pasco
- Range coordinates: 10°27′S 76°47′W
- Parent range: Andes

Raura (possibly from Quechua rawra gravel) is a mountain range located in the Andes of Peru, on the boundaries of the regions of Huánuco, Lima and Pasco. It extends between 10°21' and 10°31'S and 76°41' and 76°50'W for about 20 km. It lies a few kilometres southeast of the Huayhuash mountain range. The highest mountain in the Raura range is Yarupac which reaches an elevation of 5,685 metres (18,652 ft). The Raura mine is located on the eastern slope of the Raura range and is accessible by road. Eighteen glaciers and 245 lakes dot the Raura range.

== Description ==
Mountaineer John Ricker, said "chains of deep blue lakes, open swampy green valleys, rock and glacier-mantled peaks characterize the Cordillera Raura."

The Raura mountain range is small in area, only about 20 km (12 miles) from northwest to southeast. It is separated from the neighboring Huayhuash mountains to the northwest by a pass called the Portachuelo de Huayhuash, located near the border of the Lima region and the Huanuco region at an elevation of about 4,750 m (15,580 ft). Drainage from the west side of the Rauras is toward the Pacific Ocean via the headwaters of the Pumarinri River. The Huaura River drains the southern part of the Rauras toward the Pacific and the drainage from the north is to the Amazon River and the Atlantic Ocean via the Lauricocha River.

Peruvian Highway 110 (unpaved in 2024) bisects the Raura range. The road reaches an elevation of about 4,758 m (15,610 ft) at the entrance to the Raura mine. Open pit mines cover an area of 24 km^{2} (9.3 sq mi) and produce copper, lead, zinc, and silver. The Raura mine is one of highest in elevation in the world with mining operations reaching to 4,791 m (15,719 ft). Mining operations began on a small scale in 1890. The mine area includes permanent housing for workers. The mining operations interrupt the flow of the Lauricocha River and have resulted in pollution and the draining of glacial lakes."

== Mountains ==
The highest mountain in the range is Yarupac at 5,685 metres (18,652 ft). Other mountains are listed below:

- Santa Rosa, 5,655 metres (18,553 ft)
- Cule, 5,580 metres (18,307 ft)
- Flor de Luto, 5,529 metres (18,140 ft)
- León Huaccanan, 5,421 metres (17,785 ft)
- Condorsenja, 5,379 metres (17,648 ft)
- Quesillojanca, 5,348 metres (17,546 ft)
- Puyhuanccocha, 5,200 metres (17,060 ft)
- Chuspe, 5,000 metres (16,404 ft)
- Chacraccocha, 5,000 metres (16,404 ft)
- Chuspiccocha, 5,000 metres (16,404 ft)
- Cushuropata, 5,000 metres (16,404 ft)
- Siete Caballeros, 5,000 metres (16,404 ft)
- Sillasura, 4,800 metres (15,748 ft)
- Yanajirca, 4,782 metres (15,689 ft)

== Lakes ==
Scholars have calculated that the Cordillera Raura has 245 lakes which hold 0.49 cubic kilometers (397,249 acre feet) of water. Some of the largest lakes of the range are Patarcocha, Tinquicocha and Huascacocha.

== Snow, glaciers, and climate change ==
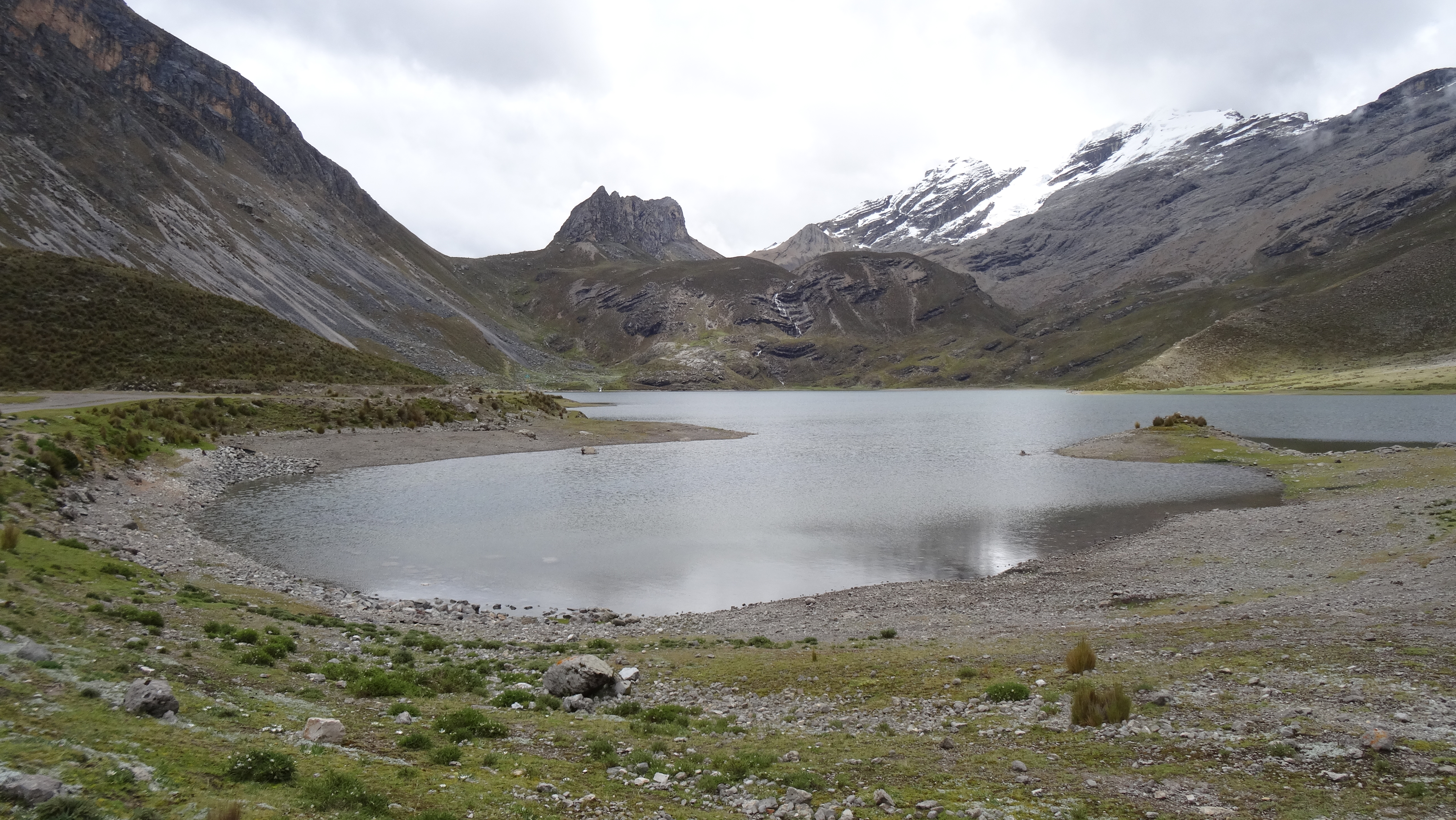
Lake Chalhuasarinan at the foot of Mount Cushuropata.

Peru has most of the glaciers found in tropical areas around the world. Tropical glaciers are disappearing due to global warming with one estimate that Peruvian glaciers lost 30 percent of their water between 2000 and 2016. The reduction in size of the glaciers has downstream consequences, especially in rivers flowing toward the desert coast of the Pacific Ocean where glacial-melt water is the principal source of water for irrigated agriculture, power generation, and consumption. Moreover, the increased melt of glaciers increases the size of glacial lakes and increases the risk of catastrophic breaching of natural dams containing lakes and a consequent loss of life downstream.

The average elevation above which permanent snow fields cover the Cordillera Raura was 4,947 m (16,230 ft) in 1986 but this rose to 5,044 m (16,549 ft) by 2005, presumably due to an increase in average temperature. (The neighboring Huayhuash mountains did not experience a similar increase in the snow line.) Eighteen glaciers cover much of the highest parts of the Raura mountains. Glaciers flow to a lower elevation on the eastern side of the range, which receives more precipitation than the western side of the range. Elevation of glaciers ranged from 4,870 m (15,980 ft) (Caballococha and Viconga) to Pichuycocha at 5,157 m (16,919 ft). The glaciated area in the Raura Mountains totaled 55 km^{2} (21 sq mi) in 2001.

Notable glaciated areas in this range are: Leon Huaccanan-Azuljanka, which is a plateau of 10 km. long and 2½ km. wide that rises eastward, to a steep cliff in its eastern margin; a tiny ice plateau at the union of the Yarupac-Torre de Cristal ridges; and finally Santa Rosa mountain which has most of the remaining glacier ice.
