= Cushuropata =

Mountain in Peru

- Location within Peru

Highest point
- Elevation: 5,000 m (16,000 ft)
- Coordinates: 10°31′42″S 76°42′57″W

Geography
- Location: Peru, Lima Region, Pasco Region
- Parent range: Andes, Rawra

Cushuropata (possibly from local Quechua kushuru an edible kind of seaweed, pata step, bank of a river) is a mountain in the Rawra mountain range in the Andes of Peru whose summit reaches about 5,000 m (16,000 ft) above sea level. It is located in the boundary between the regions of Lima and Pasco. Cushuropata lies southeast of Chuspe.
