= Rasac =

Mountain in Peru

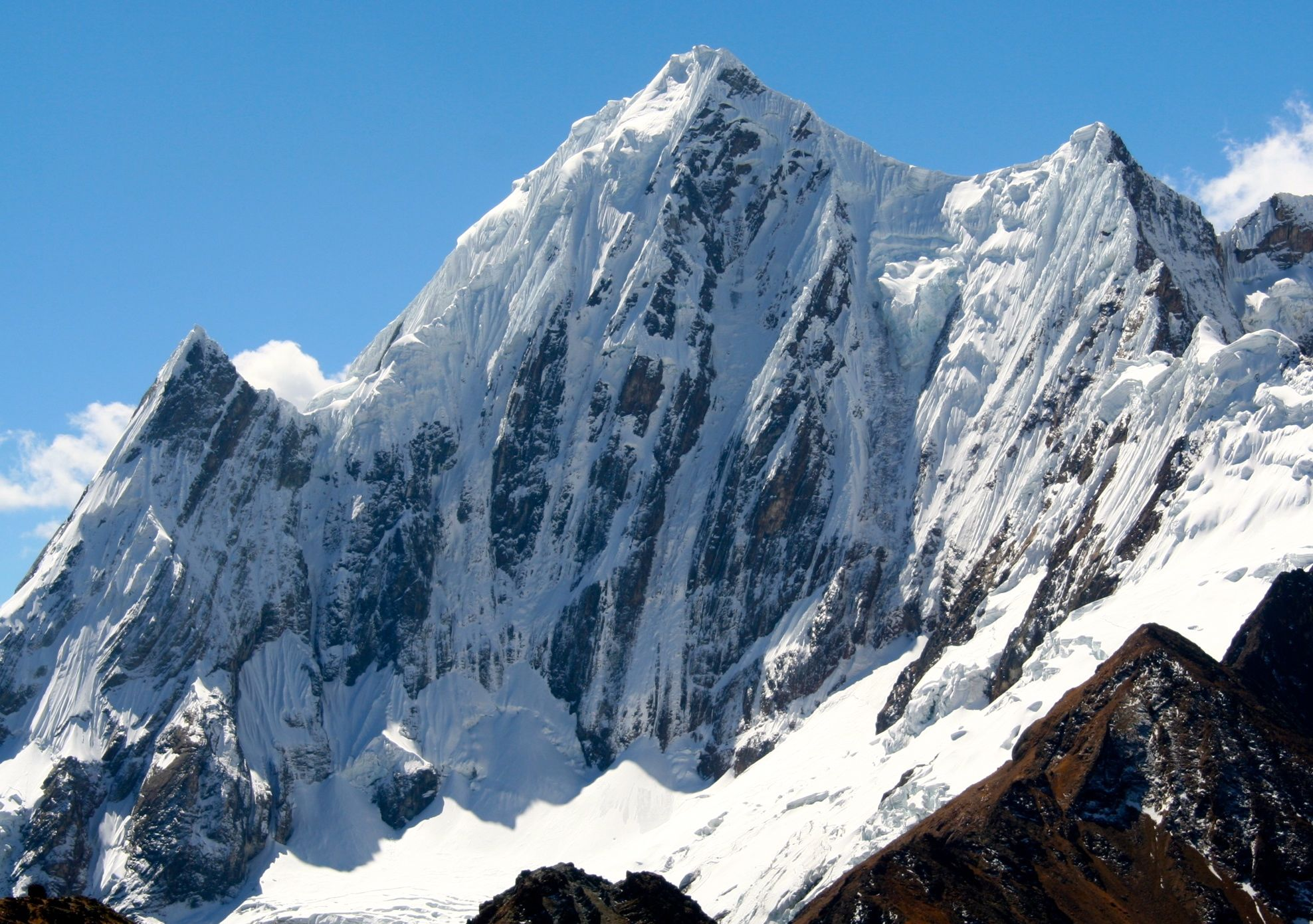
- South face of Rasac, July 2010

Highest point
- Elevation: 6,017 m (19,741 ft)
- Coordinates: 10°16′31.0″S 76°55′15.0″W

Geography
- Location within Peru
- Location: Peru
- Parent range: Andes, Huayhuash

Climbing
- First ascent: unknown
- Easiest route: glacier/snow/ice climb

Rasac (possibly Quechua for toad) is a mountain in the Huayhuash mountain range in west central Peru, part of the Andes. It has a summit elevation of 6,017 metres (19,741 ft), although other sources cite a height of 6,040 metres (19,816 ft). Rasac is a long, relatively squat mountain on the western edge of the Huayhuash range, across the glacier from the tallest peak in the range, Yerupajá. Although it is a 6,000 metre mountain, Rasac's broad profile is dwarfed by Yerupajá.

== Geology ==
As the rest of the Huayhuash, Rasac is made mainly of limestone, interbedded with sandstone and shale. These sediments were originally laid down on the ocean floor and have been pushed up and folded due to the convergence started about 90 million years ago when the Nazca oceanic plate started to slide under the South American continental plate. The limestone has a coarse, sharp texture and is light to dark grey in colour (although sometimes a slight bluish tint can occur). Marine fossils (bivalves and ammonites) may be found within some of the limestone beds. Some volcanic activity has also influenced the geology of the Huayhuash.

== Climbing ==
Rasac is considered to be the easiest 6,000-metre peak in the Huayhuash range, but it is still a challenging climb. The long, snowy West Face is divided by a series of buttresses, most of which have routes in the D range according to the International French Adjectival System. The Right Buttress is still unclimbed. The East Face is almost all rock, most of which seems in the condition not to be climbed. There is allegedly a snow route of moderate difficulty (considered to be the normal route and rated around AD) up a gulley on this face that looked in the summer of 2007 to be totally out of condition.

Even if Rasac is overall the most climbed peak of the Huayhuash range, it remains a mountain climbed very rarely (less than a climb per year). The mountain lies in a remote and wild setting. Expeditions willing to climb in this area have to be fully self-sufficient in case of an accident or emergency.

A traverse of the mountain begins with five pitches of rock up the east face to gain the south ridge, a long airy corniced snow and ice ridge to the summit followed by descending the north ridge and down NE face of mixed snow, rock and ice. V 5.8 AI 3–4 James Garrett, Paul Gonzales spring of 1996.
