= Yerupajá =

Mountain in Peru

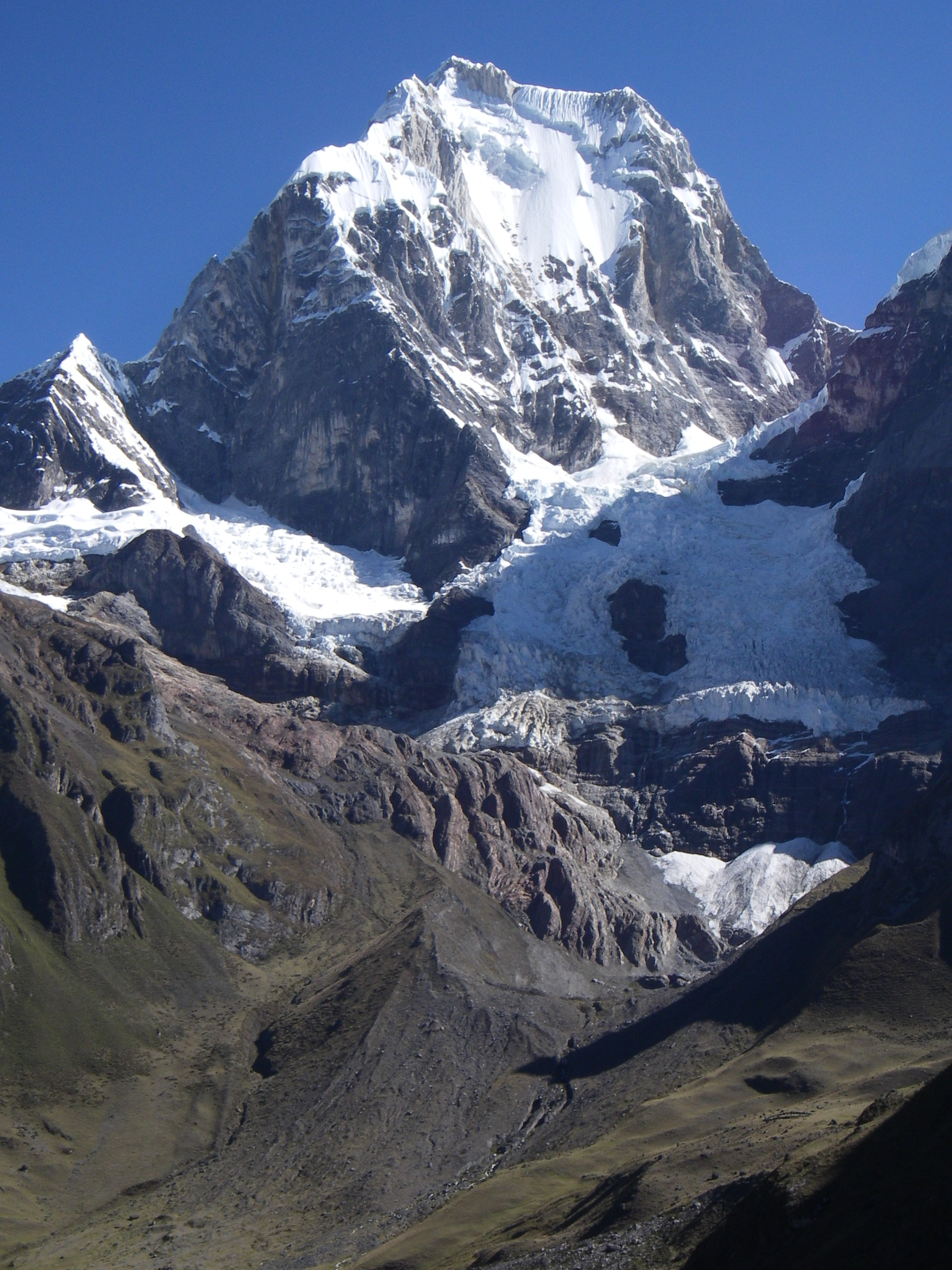
- East Face, Yerupajá, May 2006

Highest point
- Elevation: 6,635 m (21,768 ft)
- Prominence: 2,025 metres (6,644 ft)
- Parent peak: Huascaran
- Listing: Ultra
- Coordinates: 10°16′06.59″S 076°54′16.92″W

Geography
- Location within Peru
- Location: Peru, Ancash Region
- Parent range: Andes, Huayhuash mountain range

Climbing
- First ascent: 31/07/1950 - David Harrah and Jim Maxwell (USA)
- Easiest route: glacier/snow/ice climb

Yerupajá is a mountain of the Huayhuash mountain range in west central Peru, part of the Andes. It is located at Áncash, Bolognesi Province, Lauricocha Province. At 6,635 metres (21,768 ft) (other sources: 6,617 m (21,709 ft)) it is the second-highest in Peru and the highest in the Huayhuash mountain range. The summit is the highest point in the Amazon River watershed, and was first reached in 1950 by Jim Maxwell and Dave Harrah, and its northern peak (Yerupajá Norte) in 1968 by the Wellingtonian Roger Bates and Graeme Dingle. Many visitors consider Yerupajá to be the most spectacular peak in South America.

There have been only a few successful ascents of Yerupajá because it is one of the hardest Andean high peaks to climb. The most popular route is the southwest face. The approach is normally made from Huaraz southwards via Chiquián and Jahuacocha.

== Notable ascents ==
- 1950 Southern flank of West Face First ascent of peak by David Harrah and James Maxwell.
- 1966 Direct West Face 2nd ascent of peak, FA of route over 13 days by Leif Patterson and Jorge Peterek.
- 1968 Northeast Face FA of route by Chris Jones and Paul Dix (summit, July 30), supported by Dean Caldwell and Roger Hart (all US).
- 1969 East Face by Reinhold Messner and Peter Habeler.
- 2002 Main summit solo by Santiago Quintero (July 15)

== Elevation ==
Based on the elevation provided by the available Digital elevation models, SRTM2 (6558m with voids), SRTM filled with ASTER (6551m with voids), TanDEM-X(6110m with voids), Yerupaja is about 6635 meters above sea level. This altitude was considered due to the lack of topographic data or even handheld GPS data.

The height of the nearest key col is 4592 metres, so its prominence is 2025 meters. Yerupaja is listed as range or area, based on the Dominance system and its dominance is 30.6%. Its parent peak is Huascaran Sur and the topographic isolation is 148.8 kilometers. This information was obtained during a research by Suzanne Imber in 2014.

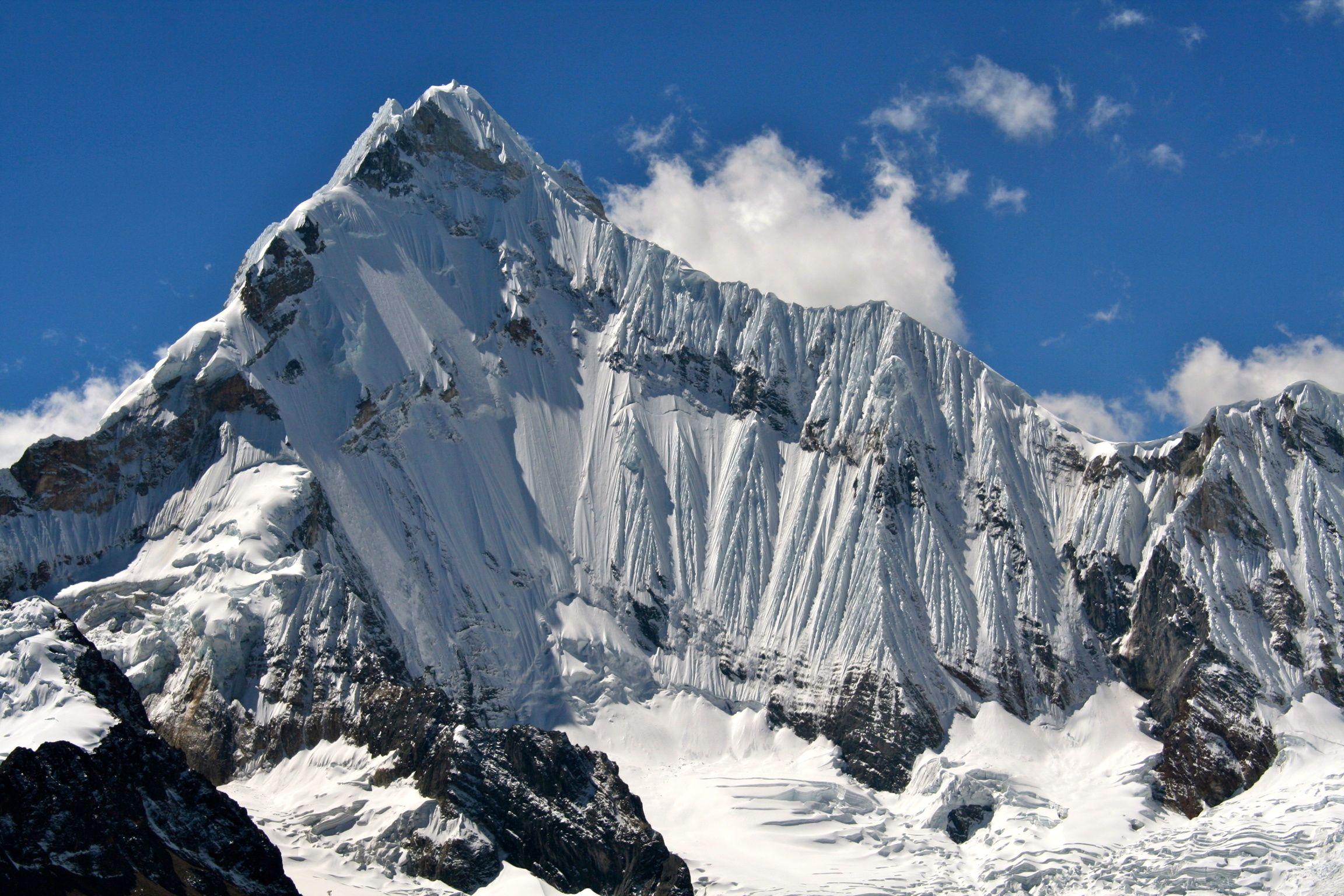
The south face of Yerupaja

== See also ==
- List of ultras of South America
- Siula Grande
