= Mataqucha =

Mountain in Peru

- Location within Peru

Highest point
- Elevation: 5,000 m (16,000 ft)
- Coordinates: 10°41′43″S 77°00′41″W

Geography
- Location: Peru, Lima Region
- Parent range: Andes

Mataqucha (Quechua mata united, qucha lake, "united lake", Hispanicized spellings Matacocha, Matacochas) is a mountain in the Andes of Peru, about 5,000 metres (16,404 ft) high, at a small lake of the same name. The mountain is located in the Lima Region, Cajatambo Province, Gorgor District, in the Huaura Province, Ambar District, and in the Oyón Province, Caujul District. It lies southeast of Wathiyaqucha and Puka Parya.

The mountain is named after a little lake south and east of the mountain. It is situated in the Caujul District at 10°41′13″S 76°59′51″W.
