= Huaura Museum =

Museum in Huaura, Peru

Coordinates: 11.0704°S 77.5986°W

Huanta Monumental Museum
- Museo Monumental de Huaura
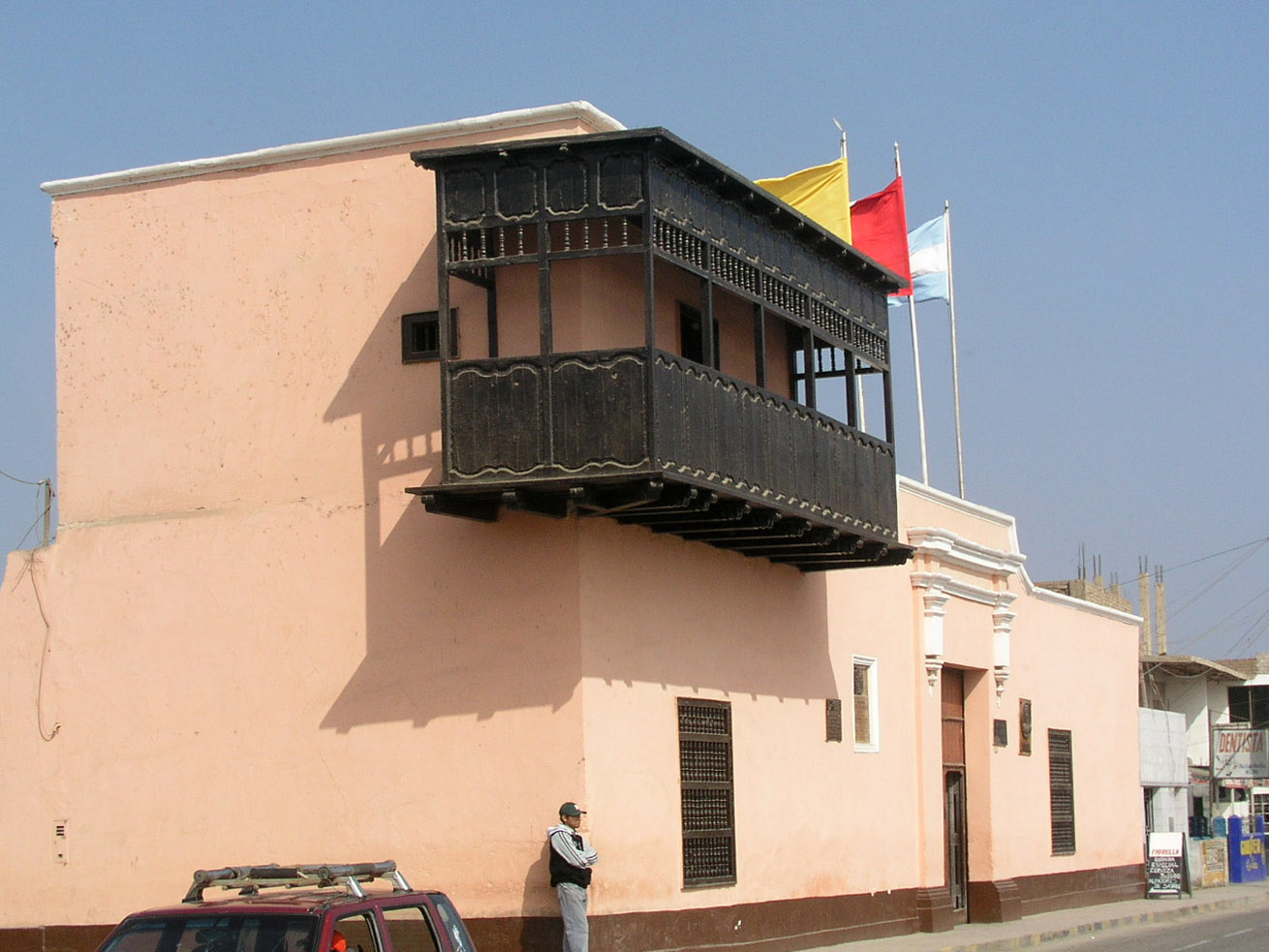
- The museum's balcony
- Established: 19 September 1974
- Location: Huaura, Peru
- Type: Historic site
- Accreditation: Municipality of Huaura

The Monumental Museum of the District Municipality of Huanta (Spanish: Museo Monumental de la Municipalidad Distrital de Huaura), also known simply as the Huaura Balcony (Spanish: Balcón de Huaura), is a war museum located in the Peruvian city of Huaura, dedicated to the memory of José de San Martín and the Liberating Expedition of Peru. The museum is housed in a Viceregal house that originally belonged to the Royal Customs of Lima. It was declared a historical monument by Law No. 9636 of October 28, 1942.

== History ==
The building was built at the beginning of the 17th century during the Spanish era, being operated by the Royal Customs of Lima. Made out of thatch, mud and wood from Nicaragua, it consists of a façade, a hallway and a main courtyard that distributes the space. It's located in the city's plaza, where a church also stood until it was destroyed by an earthquake, with its bell being moved to Argentina in 1950 at the request of then president Juan Perón.

The building belonged to Fermín Francisco de Carvajal-Vargas until José de San Martín occupied it during the Peruvian War of Independence, San Martín first declared the independence of the country from the building's balcony, where it also served as his provisional headquarters before his march into Lima.

In 1836, it was declared as the Government Palace of North Peru, a constituent state of the Peru–Bolivian Confederation.

By Supreme Resolution of the Ministry of Development on June 29, 1921, the Government of Augusto B. Leguía considered its acquisition of public utility for the celebration of the Centennial of the Independence of Peru. In that celebration, a large demonstration was held in the town, with the main stage also known as the Balcony of Independence.

In 1942, the building was declared a historical monument by Law No. 9636 of October 28, 1942, under the government of Manuel Prado Ugarteche.

=== Museum and balcony ===
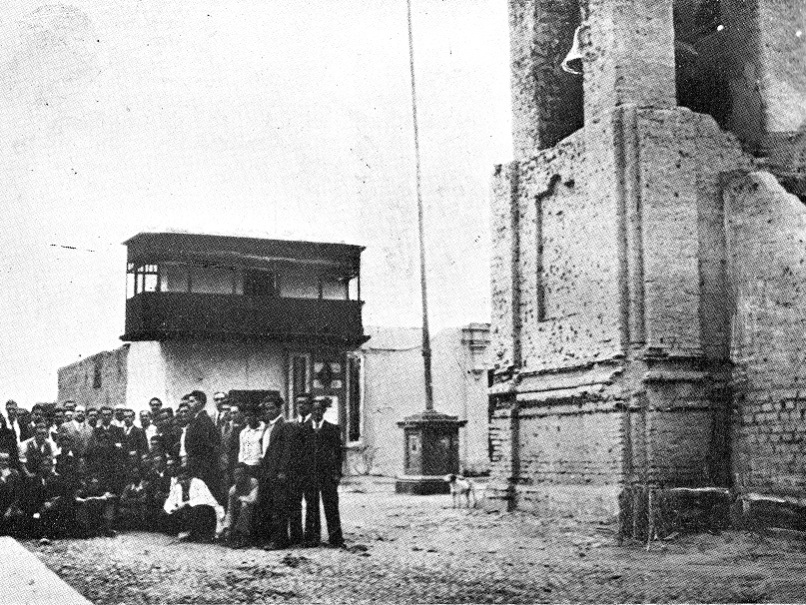
The building in the early 1920s.

Since 1974 the building has been reconditioned to be a museum space, officially named in 1996 as the Monumental Museum of the District Municipality of Huaura. The plans to convert the house to a museum were carried out by the National Commission for the Sesquicentennial of the Independence of Peru, who put architect Emilio Harth Terré in charge of the building's remodelling. The house is under the ownership of the Municipality of Huaura District, but the balcony is owned by the Peruvian State.

On July 24, 1985, members of the Túpac Amaru Revolutionary Movement (MRTA) broke into the museum and stole a replica of the sable used by San Martín, the original first flag of Peru designed by San Martín and a replica of an Argentine flag. The relics were later recovered and returned, but the flag never returned to the city, instead remaining in Lima. A replica has since replaced the original flag during celebrations held in the city.

The museum was visited during the Bicentennial of the Independence of Peru by then president Francisco Sagasti.

== See also ==
- Palacio de la Magdalena, where San Martín and Simón Bolívar stayed in La Magdalena, today part of the city of Lima
