= Raphael Girard =

Swiss-Guatemalan ethnographer (1898-1982)

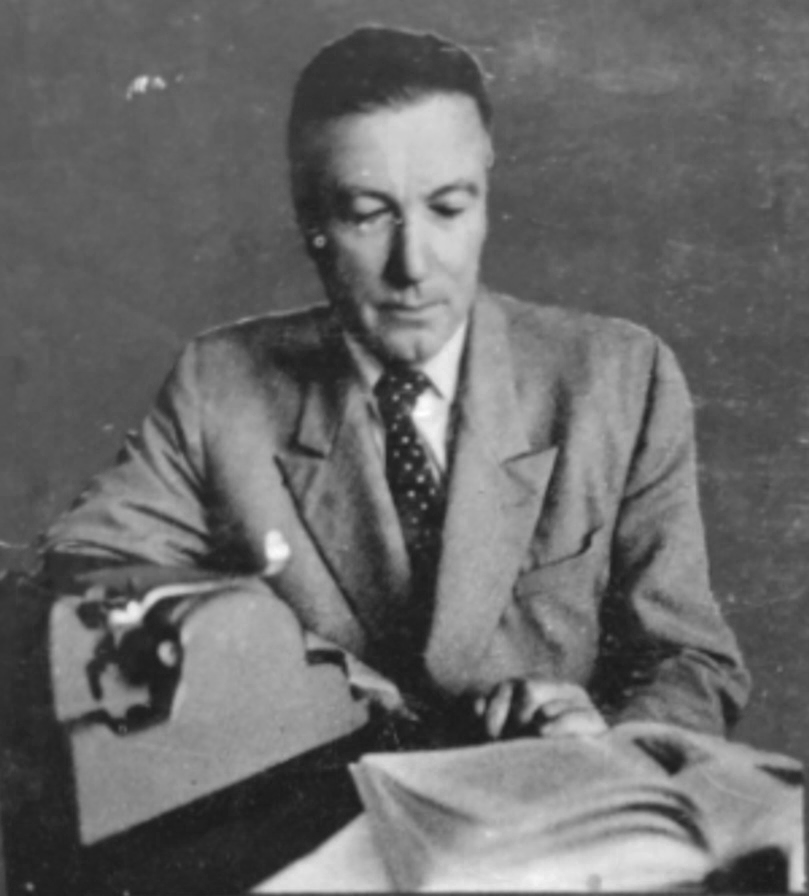
- Raphael Girard in 1967
- Born: October 30 1898; Martigny, Switzerland
- Died: December 25 1982; Guatemala city
- Citizenship: Guatemala
- Occupation: Ethnographer
- Partner: Rebeca Carrión Cachot (m. 1955)
- Parent(s): Joseph Girard and Melanie Besse de Girard
- Awards: Order of Francisco Morazán; Commander of the Order of the Sun of Peru; Order of the Quetzal; Order of José Matías Delgado; Order of Rubén Darío

Academic background
- Education: Geneva University

Academic work
- Discipline: Archaeologist, ethnology
- Sub-discipline: Archaeologist of Mesoamerica tribes

Raphael Girard (October 30, 1898, in Martigny, Switzerland – December 25, 1982, in Guatemala City) was an Maya ethnographer who specializes at Mesoamerican tribes culture and traditions. He and his wife, Rebeca Carrión Cachot moved to Guatemala city in 1955 so to research what subsequently became the book "Esotericism of the Popol Vuh".

== Early life ==
Raphael Girard was born in Martigny, Switzerland. His parents were Joseph Girard, a public worker businessman, and Melanie Besse de Girard, an elementary school teacher, however she died was he was 14. Since Raphael Girard was a child he showed intellectual skills. In 1915 he published many book like Le Centenaire Valaisan, Sur le Trim.

== Career ==
He started as a professor in "Lycée St. Maurice". In 1918 he joined the Swiss army 4th Company, XII Battalion mountain infantry, On January 10, 1919, with the support of Eugene Pittard of Geneva University, he joined the Society of History and Geography of Paris. He then sailed to Honduras. Fellow anthropologist pioneers, Esteban Guardiola, Luis Land, Félix Salgado, Pedro Rivas, Jesús Aguilar and Rebeca Carrión Cachot which he married in December 1955, founded the Honduran Society of History and Geography. He then completed ethnographic works about the Hicaques, Mayans Payas, Caribss, Miskitos, and Susmus.

== Bibliography ==
- 1947. Génesis y función de la Greca escalonada.
- 1948. El Calendario maya-mexica: origen, función, desarrollo y lugar de procedencia.
- 1948. Esoterismo en el Popol Vuh.
- 1949. Algunos characteres psicológicos de los Chortís – Honduras.
- 1949. Los Chortís ante el problema Maya: historia de las culturas indígenas de América, desde su origen hasta hoy.
- 1951. Historia del origen y desarrollo de las culturas indoamericanas.
- 1951. Refutación de una crítica a “Los Chortís ante el problema Maya”.
- 1952. El popol –vuh fuente histórica.
- 1955. Correlación entre mitos, ritos actuales y arqueología maya.
- 1955. Réplica a la crítica de Heinrich Berlin sobre “El Popol Vuh, fuente histórica”.
- 1958. Indios selváticos de la Amazonía peruana: con 207 fotografías, 100 figuras y 2 mapas.
- 1958. Guatemala en el XXXIII Congreso Internacional de Americanistas.
- 1959. El colapso maya y los nahuas.
- 1960. La Civilización maya y sus epigonales.
- 1962. Los Mayas eternos.
- 1966. Los mayas: su civilización, su historia, sus vinculaciones continentales.
- 1968. La Misteriosa Cultura Omeca: últimos descubrimientos de esculturas pre Olmecas en el municipio: La Democracia.
- 1969. La Misteriosa Cultura Olmeca.
- 1976. Historia de las civilizaciones Antiguas de América: desde sus orígenes.
- 1977. Origen y desarrollo de las civilizaciones Antiguas de América.
