= Huaura =

City of historical significance in Peru

- City
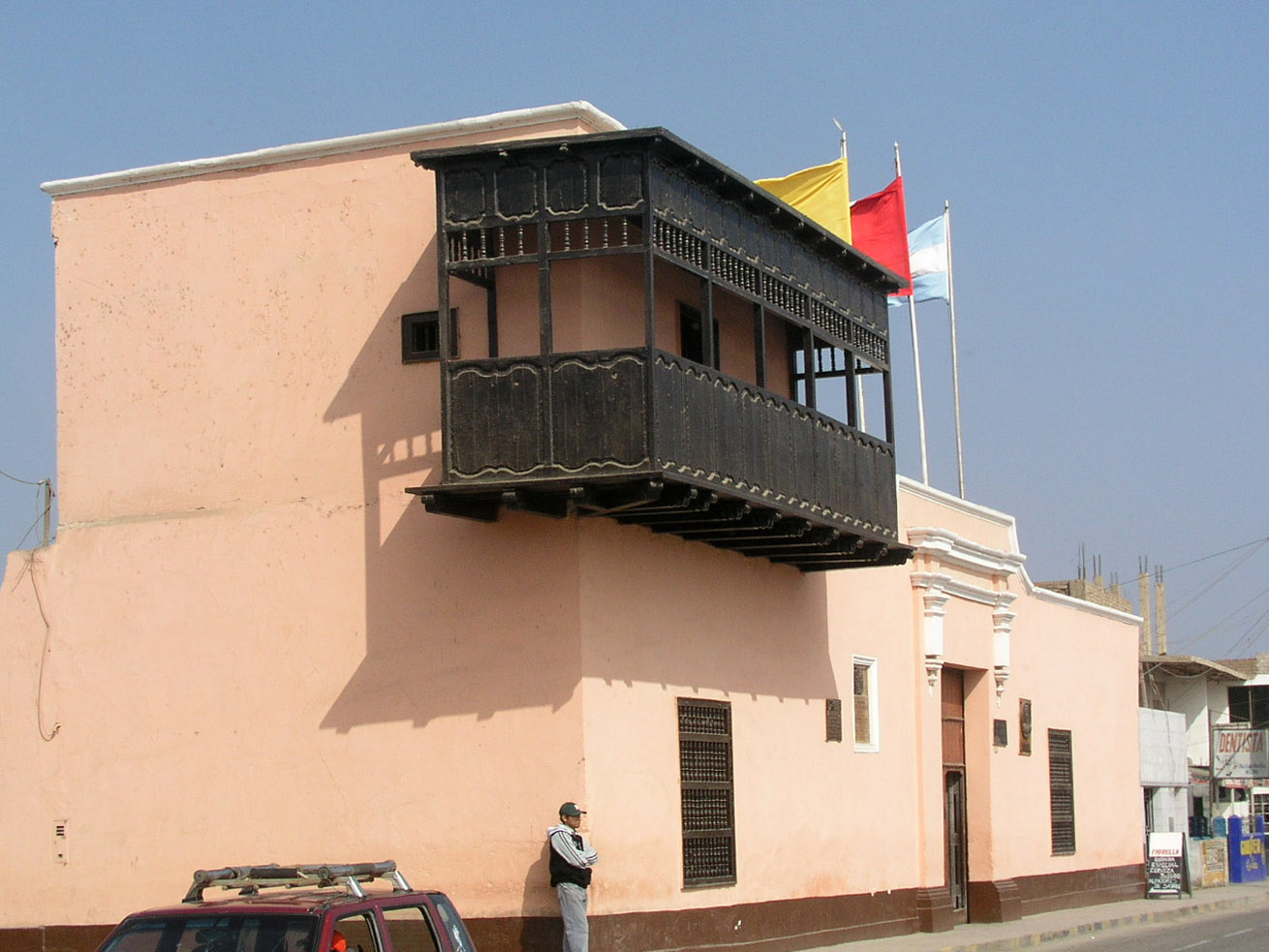

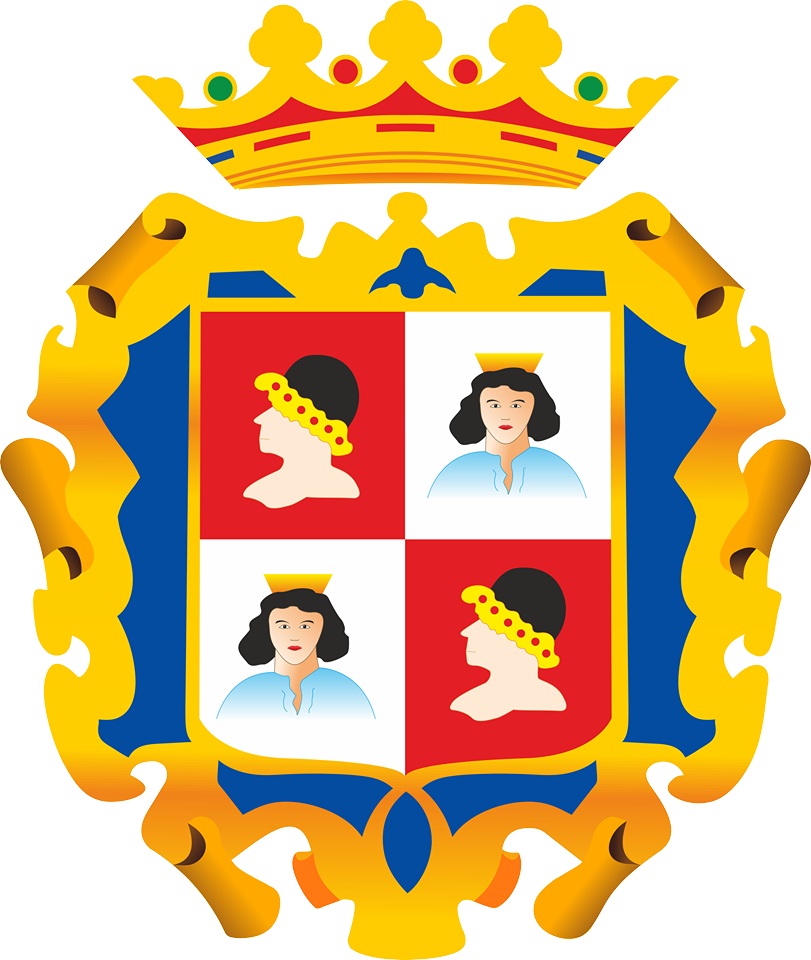
- Coat of arms
- Nickname: Cuna de la Independencia del Perú (Cradle of the Independence of Peru)
- Location within Peru
- Country: Peru
- Department: Lima
- Province: Huaura
- District: Huaura
- Founded: July 25, 1597

Government
  - Mayor: Juan José Reaño Antúnez
- Elevation: 30 m (98 ft)

Population (2017)
  - Total: 24,668
- Demonym(s): Huaurino, -na
- Time zone: UTC-5 (PET)

Huaura is a city in Peru. It is the capital of the homonymous district located in the province of Huaura in the department of Lima. It had an estimated population of 24,668 according to the 2017 census. It ceased to be the provincial capital in 1866 in favor of the city of Huacho and is part of the conurbation formed around the latter by means of two bridges over the Huaura River.

The city's main square houses the Huaura Museum, the site of the proclamation of the independence of Peru by José de San Martín in 1820.

== History ==
The city was founded under the name of Villa de Carrión de Velasco on July 25, 1597.

On November 27, 1820, José de San Martín proclaimed the independence of Peru from a balcony in an old Viceregal house that originally belonged to the Royal Customs of Lima, working today as the city's museum.

A constituent assembly known as the Huaura Assembly was held from August 3 to 24, 1836, and featured representatives from La Libertad, Lima, Huaylas, Maynas and Junín. On August 11, North Peru was officially established through the promulgation of its constitution by the then President Luis José de Orbegoso, naming Andrés de Santa Cruz—who triumphantly entered Lima on August 15—as the Supreme Protector of the state. Orbegoso also presented his resignation, but it was not approved by the assembly, who named him provisional president. The assembly also established the new territorial divisions of the country.

In 1920, festivities were held in the town's balcony as part of the Centennial of the Independence of Peru organised by the second government of Augusto B. Leguía.

On July 24, 1985, members of the Túpac Amaru Revolutionary Movement (MRTA) broke into the city's historic museum and stole a replica of the sable used by San Martín, the original first flag of Peru designed by San Martín and a replica of an Argentine flag. The relics were later recovered and returned, but the flag never returned to the city, instead remaining in Lima. A replica has since replaced the original flag during celebrations held in the city.

In 2021, the city was named as the emblematic city of the Bicentennial of the Independence of Peru, being visited by then president Francisco Sagasti.

== Climate ==
The city has a desert climate. The average annual temperature is 19.1 °C. Rainfall is almost nil.

Climate data for Huaura
| Month | Jan | Feb | Mar | Apr | May | Jun | Jul | Aug | Sep | Oct | Nov | Dec | Year |
|---|---|---|---|---|---|---|---|---|---|---|---|---|---|
| Daily mean °F | 71.1 | 72.5 | 72.1 | 69.4 | 65.8 | 63.5 | 63 | 61.7 | 62.1 | 63.1 | 65.5 | 68 | 66.5 |
| Daily mean °C | 21.7 | 22.5 | 22.3 | 20.8 | 18.8 | 17.5 | 17 | 16.5 | 16.7 | 17.3 | 18.6 | 20 | 19.1 |
Source: climate-data.org

== Festivities ==
| Date | Festivities |
|---|---|
| March–April | Holy Week |
| July 16 | Virgen del Carmen (Huaura) |
| July 28–29 | Fiestas Patrias |
| November 27 | First proclamation of the Independence of Peru from Huaura Balcony |

== See also ==
- Plaza Mayor, Lima, where independence was again proclaimed in 1821
- Sicuani, where South Peru was proclaimed in 1836
- Tapacarí, where the Bolivian Republic was proclaimed in 1836

== Bibliography ==
- Basadre Grohmann, Jorge (2014). Historia de la República del Perú [1822-1933]. Vol. 2. El Comercio. ISBN 978-612-306-353-5.
- Tamayo Herrera, José (1985). Nuevo Compendio de Historia del Perú. Editorial Lumen.
