= San Ignacio Municipality =

San Ignacio Municipality may refer to:

- San Ignacio Municipality, Santa Cruz, Bolivia
- San Ignacio Municipality, Beni, Bolivia
- San Ignacio, Chalatenango, El Salvador
- San Ignacio, Francisco Morazán, Honduras
- San Ignacio Cerro Gordo, Jalisco, Mexico
- San Ignacio Municipality, Sinaloa, Mexico
