= Church of Santa María Magdalena (Lima) =

Church in Pueblo Libre, Peru

Coordinates: 12°04′41″S 77°03′48″W

Church of Saint Mary Magdalene
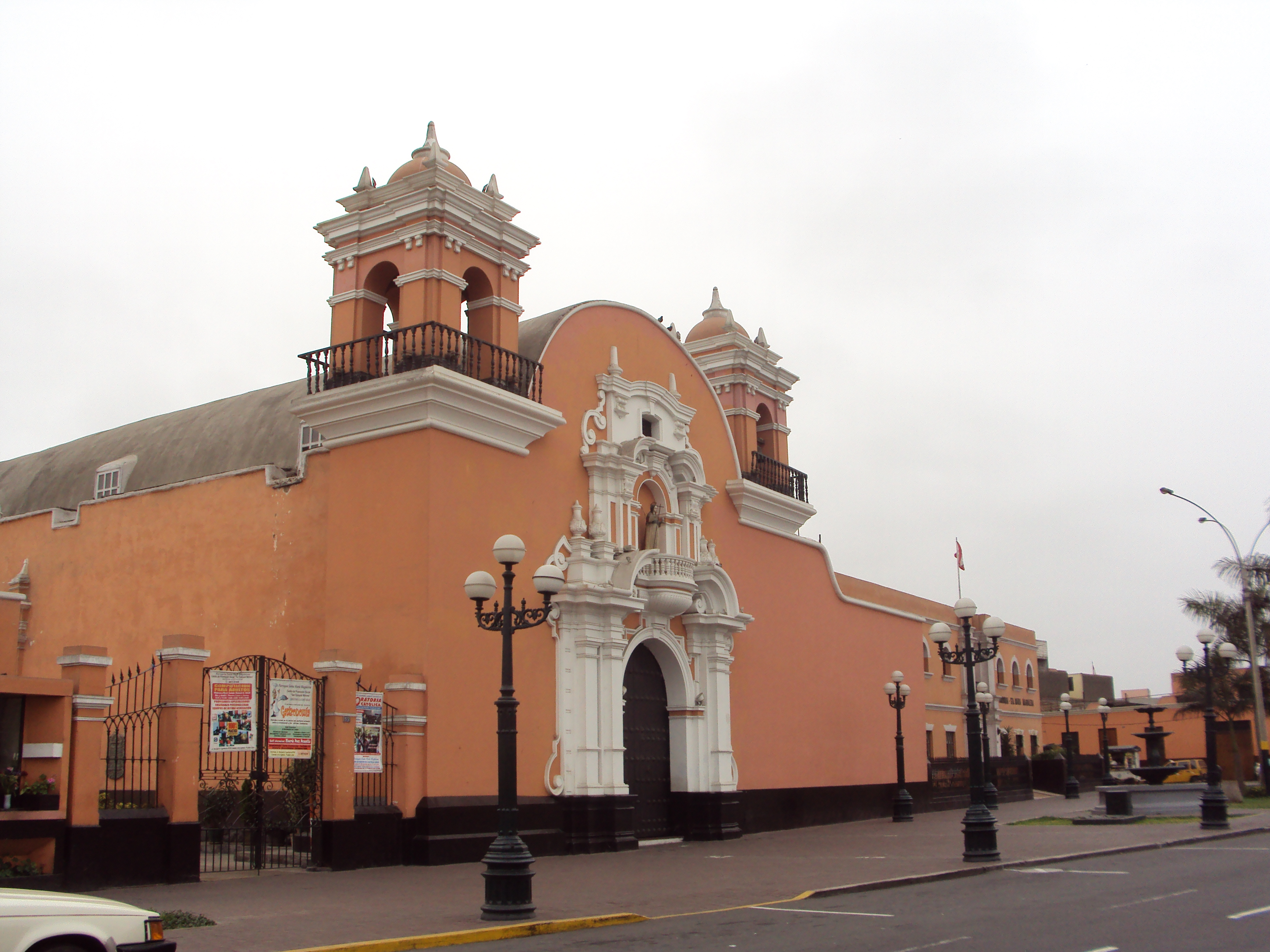
- Church of Saint Mary Magdalene
- Country: Peru
- Denomination: Roman Catholic

Architecture
- Style: Baroque

Administration
- Diocese: Lima

The Church of Saint Mary Magdalene (Spanish: Iglesia de Santa María Magdalena) is a Catholic church under the ecclesiastical jurisdiction of the Archdiocese of Lima, located at Avenida San Martin 1138, in the district of Pueblo Libre, Lima, Peru. It was declared Cultural Heritage of the Nation in 1942 by resolution LN° 9599.

It features a traditional Isabellan-style hall plan and a main altar with baroque decoration, as well as a series of eight side altars, all covered in gold leaf. Since 1944, the church and its premises have been run by the Order of Augustinian Recollects.

== History ==
Its construction began in 1557, on land donated to the Franciscan Order by the main cacique of the Valley of Lima, Gonzalo Taulichusco, after being baptized and so that the religious could begin evangelization, under the name of the Doctrine of the Blessed Magdalene. This donation was approved by Viceroy Andrés Hurtado de Mendoza, 3rd Marquis of Cañete, and confirmed in 1587 by Viceroy Fernando Torres y Portugal. It is the oldest rural church in Lima, since the land where it was settled was mostly farmland.

The church has undergone several modifications and repairs due to the earthquakes that have affected its structure.

== See also ==
- National Museum of Archaeology, Anthropology and History of Peru, located nearby
