= Waqra Punta =

Mountain in Peru

- Location within Peru

Highest point
- Elevation: 5,000 m (16,000 ft)
- Coordinates: 10°40′21″S 77°06′17″W

Geography
- Location: Peru, Lima Region
- Parent range: Andes

Waqra Punta (Quechua waqra horn, punta peak, ridge; first, before, in front of, "horn peak (or ridge)", Hispanicized spelling Huagra Punta) is a mountain in the Andes of Peru which reaches an altitude of approximately 5,000 m (16,000 ft) high. It is situated in the Lima Region, Cajatambo Province, Gorgor District, and in the Huaura Province, Ambar District. Waqra Punta lies northeast of Phiri Uya.
