= Muruqucha =

Mountain in Peru

- Location within Peru

Highest point
- Elevation: 5,193 m (17,037 ft)
- Coordinates: 10°58′37″S 76°35′23″W

Geography
- Location: Peru, Lima Region
- Parent range: Andes

Muruqucha (Quechua muru blunt; mutilated; stained; pip, grain; smallpox, qucha lake, Hispanicized spelling Morococha) is a 5,193-metre-high (17,037 ft) mountain near a little lake of that name in the Andes of Peru. It is located in the Lima Region, Huaura Province, Santa Leonor District. It lies southeast of Chururuyuq and east of Chururu.

The lake named Muruqucha is southeast of the mountain in the Pasco Region, Pasco Province, Huayllay District, at 10°59′23″S 76°34′40″W.
