= Ambar District =

Coordinates: 10.7563°S 77.2720°W

Ambar
- District
- Interactive map of Ambar
- Country: Peru
- Region: Lima
- Province: Huaura
- Capital: Ambar

Government
  - Mayor: Ruben Isidoro Fuentes Rivera Caldas

Area
  - Total: 919.4 km^{2} (355.0 sq mi)
- Elevation: 2,082 m (6,831 ft)

Population (2017)
  - Total: 2,208
  - Density: 2.402/km^{2} (6.220/sq mi)
- Time zone: UTC-5 (PET)
- UBIGEO: 150802

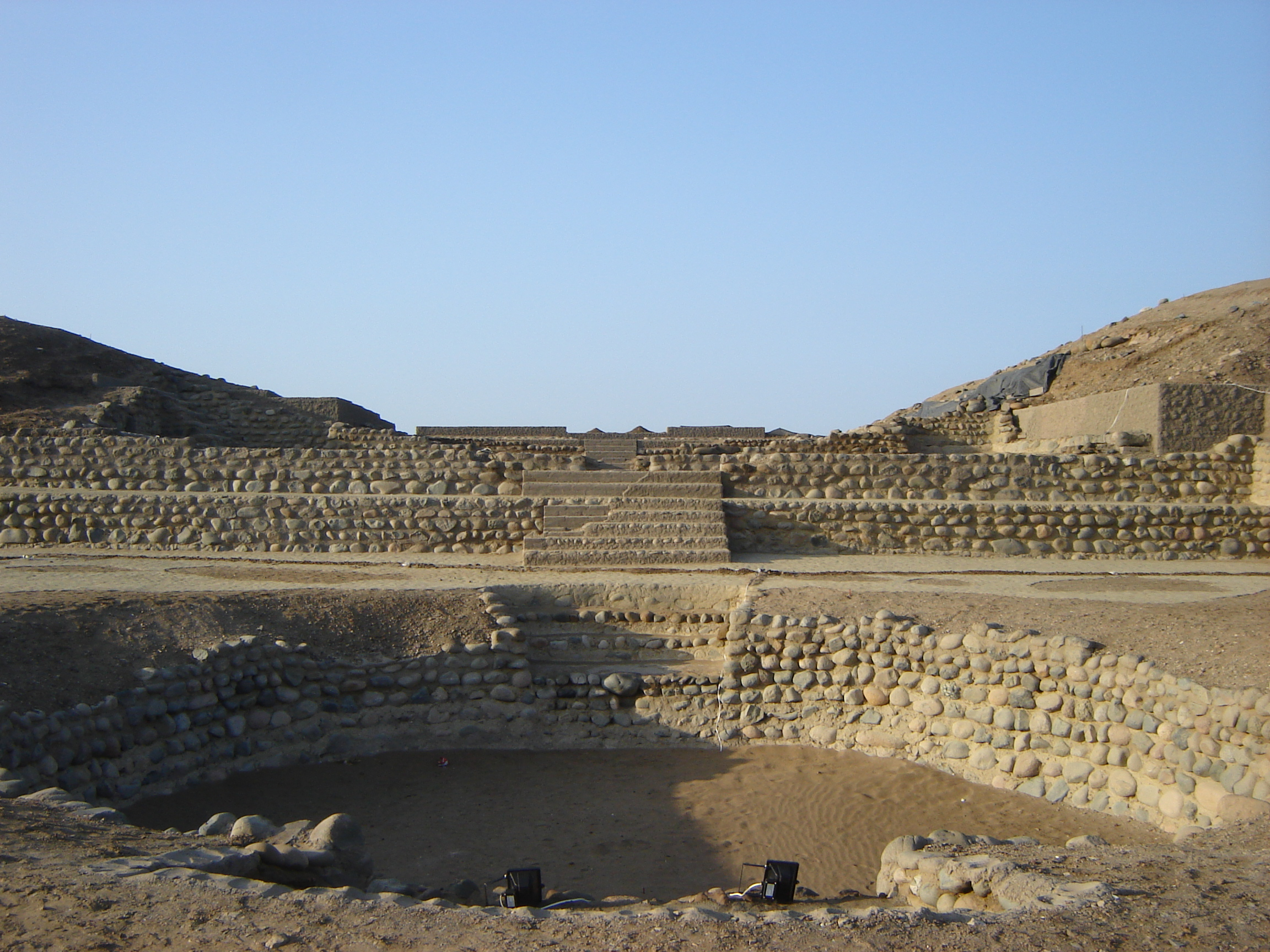
Front view of the Early Temple at Bandurria archaeological site.

Ambar District is one of twelve districts of the province Huaura in Peru.

== Geography ==
Some of the highest mountains of the district are listed below:

- Ch'ura
- Mataqucha
- Puka Parya
- Phasa Pukyu
- Phiri Uya
- Waqra Punta
- Wathiyaqucha
