= Checras District =

Coordinates: 10.9179°S 76.8253°W

Checras Chiqra
- District
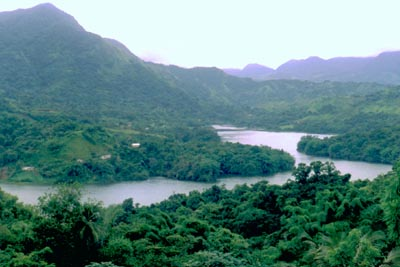
- Interactive map of Checras
- Country: Peru
- Region: Lima
- Province: Huaura
- Capital: Maray

Government
  - Mayor: Teodoro Modesto Rosas Estela

Area
  - Total: 166.37 km^{2} (64.24 sq mi)
- Elevation: 3,743 m (12,280 ft)

Population (2017)
  - Total: 929
  - Density: 5.58/km^{2} (14.5/sq mi)
- Time zone: UTC-5 (PET)
- UBIGEO: 150804

Checras District is one of twelve districts of the province Huaura in Peru.
