= Vegueta District =

Coordinates: 11.0208°S 77.6376°W

Vegueta
- District
- Interactive map of Vegueta
- Country: Peru
- Region: Lima
- Province: Huaura
- Founded: August 23, 1920
- Capital: Vegueta

Government
  - Mayor: Victor De los Santos (2019-2022)

Area
  - Total: 253.94 km^{2} (98.05 sq mi)
- Elevation: 12 m (39 ft)

Population (2017)
  - Total: 25,912
  - Density: 102.04/km^{2} (264.28/sq mi)
- Time zone: UTC-5 (PET)
- UBIGEO: 150812

Vegueta District is one of twelve districts of the province Huaura in Peru.
