= Santa Leonor District =

Coordinates: 10.9484°S 76.7449°W

Santa Leonor Distrito de Santa Leonor
- District
- Interactive map of Santa Leonor
- Country: Peru
- Region: Lima
- Province: Huaura
- Founded: June 3, 1940
- Capital: Jucul

Government
  - Mayor: Teodulo Garcia Flores

Area
  - Total: 375.49 km^{2} (144.98 sq mi)
- Elevation: 3,580 m (11,750 ft)

Population (2005 census)
  - Total: 1,224
  - Density: 3.260/km^{2} (8.443/sq mi)
- Time zone: UTC-5 (PET)
- UBIGEO: 150809

Santa Leonor District is one of the twelve districts that make up the province of Huaura in the Department of Lima, Peru. It is located within the juridsprudiction of the Regional Government of Lima.

== Geography ==
Some of the highest mountains of the district are listed below:

- Anta Ñawin
- Chuchun
- Chunta
- Chururu
- Chururuyuq
- Mankha Ukru
- Muruqucha
- Pari Chuku
- Puka Tampu
- Qawi
- Wamanripa
- Yana Uqhu
- Yuraq Allpa

== See also ==
- Q'asaqucha
