= Order of the Sun of Peru =

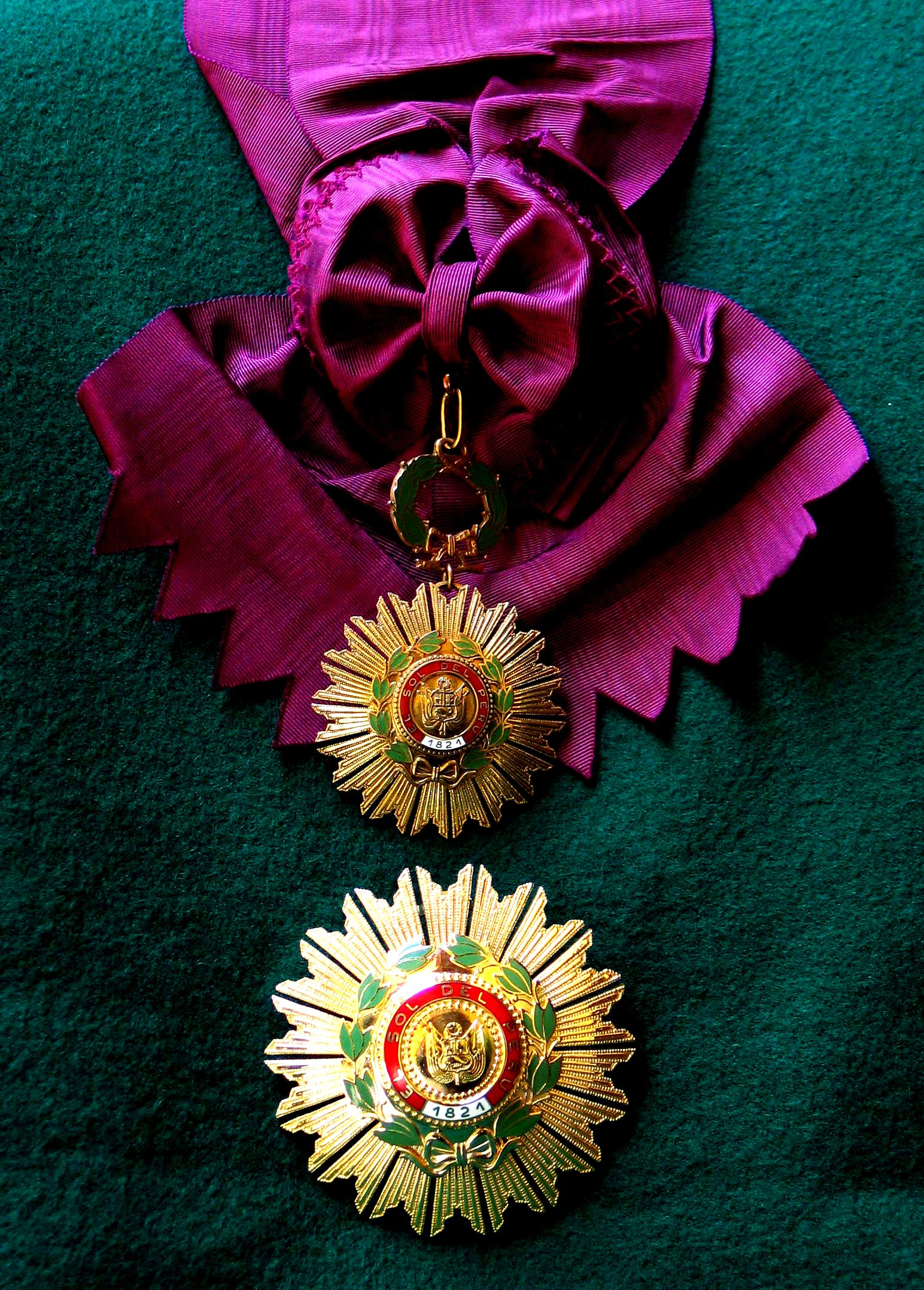
- Type: Order of merit
- Awarded for: Civil and military merit
- Description: Purple ribbon
- Presented by: the Republic of Peru
- Eligibility: All
- Status: Currently awarded
- Established: 8 October 1821, discontinued 1825, re-established 1921
- Ribbon of the Order

Precedence
- Next (higher): None (highest)
- Next (lower): Order of Merit for Distinguished Service

The Order of the Sun of Peru (Spanish: Orden El Sol del Perú), formerly known as the Order of the Sun, is the highest award bestowed by the nation of Peru to commend notable civil and military merit. The award is the oldest civilian award in the Americas, first being established in 1821. The imagery of the sun is associated with Inti, the Incan sun god and believed ancestor of the ruler to the Incan Empire once ruled over Peru.

== History ==
The Order was originally instituted on 8 October 1821 by General José de San Martín upon reaching Lima, to recognize those who had distinguished themselves in the campaign against the Spanish Royalists. The three classes of appointment to the Order were, in descending order of precedence: Founder, Meritorious and Associate.

It was discontinued four years later, after many grantees started to use the award as a nobility title, similar to the earlier Castile titles awarded by the colonial government. The Congress issued a law abolishing the Order of the Sun on 9 May 1825.

In 1921, the Order was re-established to commemorate the Centennial of Peruvian Independence.

== Classes ==
The award consists of the following classes:

1. Grand Collar
2. Grand Cross with Diamonds
3. Grand Cross
4. Grand Officer
5. Commander
6. Officer
7. Knight

Ribbon bars
Grand Collar	Grand Cross with Diamonds	Grand Cross	Grand Officer
Commander	Officer	Knight	

== Notable recipients ==
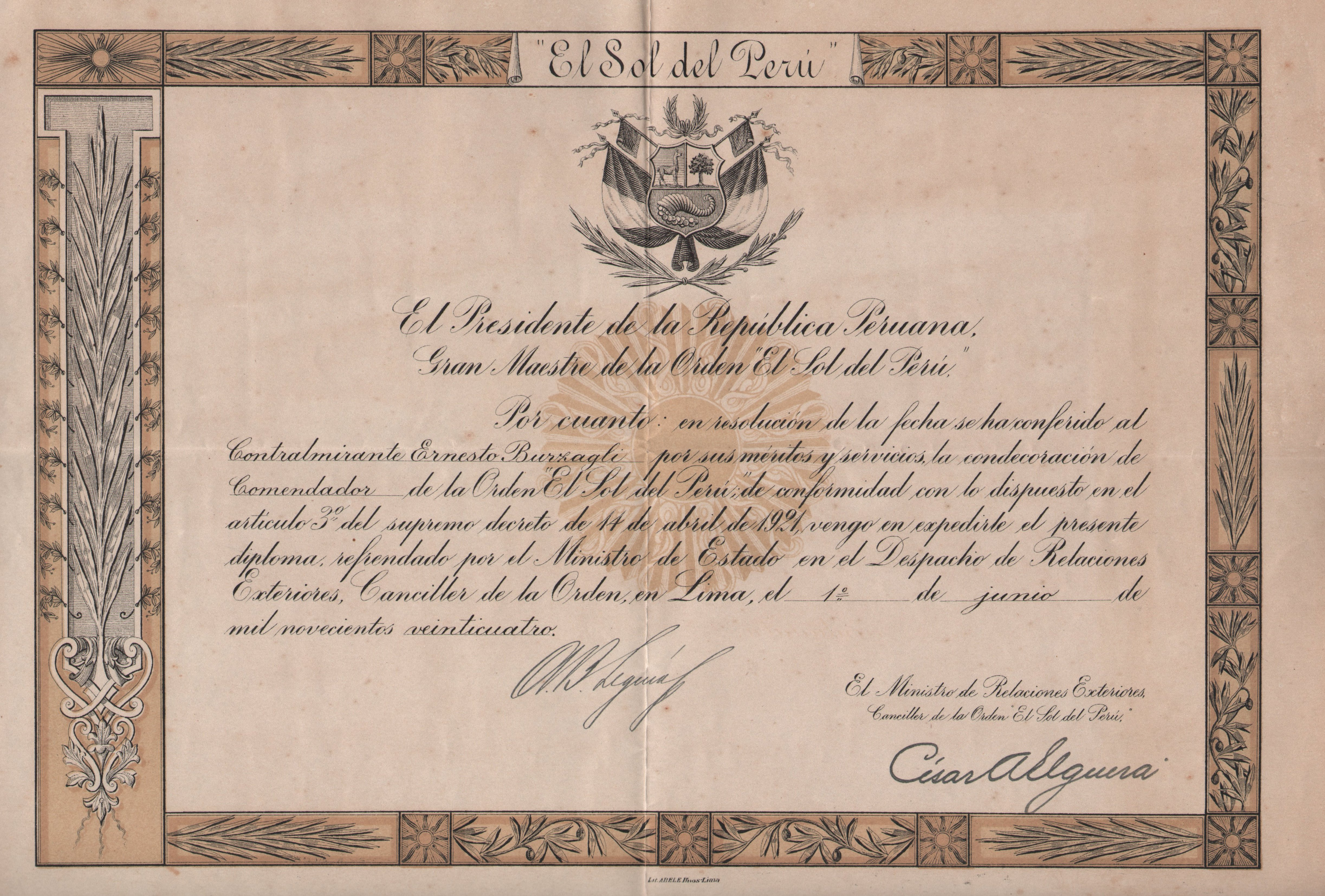
Certificate confirming that the Order of the Sun of Peru was conferred on Ernesto Burzagli in the name of the President of the Peruvian Republic in 1924.

=== Royalty ===
- Sultan Hassanal Bolkiah of Brunei, Grand Collar (12 November 2024)
- King Philip VI of Spain, invested as a Grand Cross (17 October 1991) and later promoted to Grand Collar (7 July 2015)
- Emir Tamim bin Hamad Al Thani of Qatar, Grand Collar (13 February 2014)
- King Abdullah II of Jordan, Grand Cross with Diamonds (23 May 2005)
- King Mohammed VI of Morocco, Grand Cross with Diamonds (30 November 2004)
- Queen Letizia of Spain (as Princess of Asturias), Grand Cross (5 July 2004)
- Prince Albert II of Monaco (as Hereditary Prince), Grand Cross (25 November 2003)
- King Ja'afar of Negeri Sembilan of Malaysia, Grand Cross with Diamonds (8 November 1996)
- King Rama IX of Thailand, Grand Cross with Diamonds (8 November 1996)
- Prince Michael of Kent, Grand Cross (2 November 1994)
- King Rama X of Thailand, Grand Cross (10 April 1993)
- Emperor Akihito, invested as a Grand Cross (11 May 1967) and later promoted to Grand Cross with Diamonds (13 March 1992)
- Empress Michiko, Grand Cross (13 March 1992)
- Queen Sofía of Spain, Grand Cross (17 October 1991)
- King Juan Carlos I of Spain, Grand Cross with Diamonds (8 November 1978)
- Emperor Haile Selassie, Grand Cross (1966)
- King Albert II of Belgium (as Prince of Liège), Grand Cross (23 October 1965)
- Prince Philip, Duke of Edinburgh, Grand Cross with Diamonds (13 February 1962)
- Empress Nagako, Grand Cross (24 April 1961)
- Queen Elizabeth II of the United Kingdom, Grand Cross with Diamonds (1960)
- King Gustaf VI Adolf of Sweden
- King Edward VIII of the United Kingdom (as Prince of Wales), Grand Cross (1931)
- Maharaja Jagatjit Singh of Kapurthala (1925)
- King Alfonso XIII of Spain, Grand Cross with Diamonds (1923)
- King Gustaf V of Sweden, Grand Cross with Diamonds (1923)
- King Christian X of Denmark, Grand Cross with Diamonds (1922)
- Queen Wilhelmina of the Netherlands, Grand Cross with Diamonds (1922)
- King Albert I of Belgium, Grand Cross with Diamonds (1922)
- King Victor Emmanuel III of Italy, Grand Cross with Diamonds (1922)
- King Haakon VII of Norway, Grand Cross with Diamonds (1922)
- Emperor Yoshihito of Japan, Grand Cross with Diamonds (1922)
- King Ferdinand I of Romania, Grand Cross with Diamonds (1922)
- Grand Duchess Charlotte of Luxembourg, Grand Cross with Diamonds (1922)
- King Leopold III of Belgium (as Prince of Belgium), Grand Cross with Diamonds (1922)

=== Other people ===
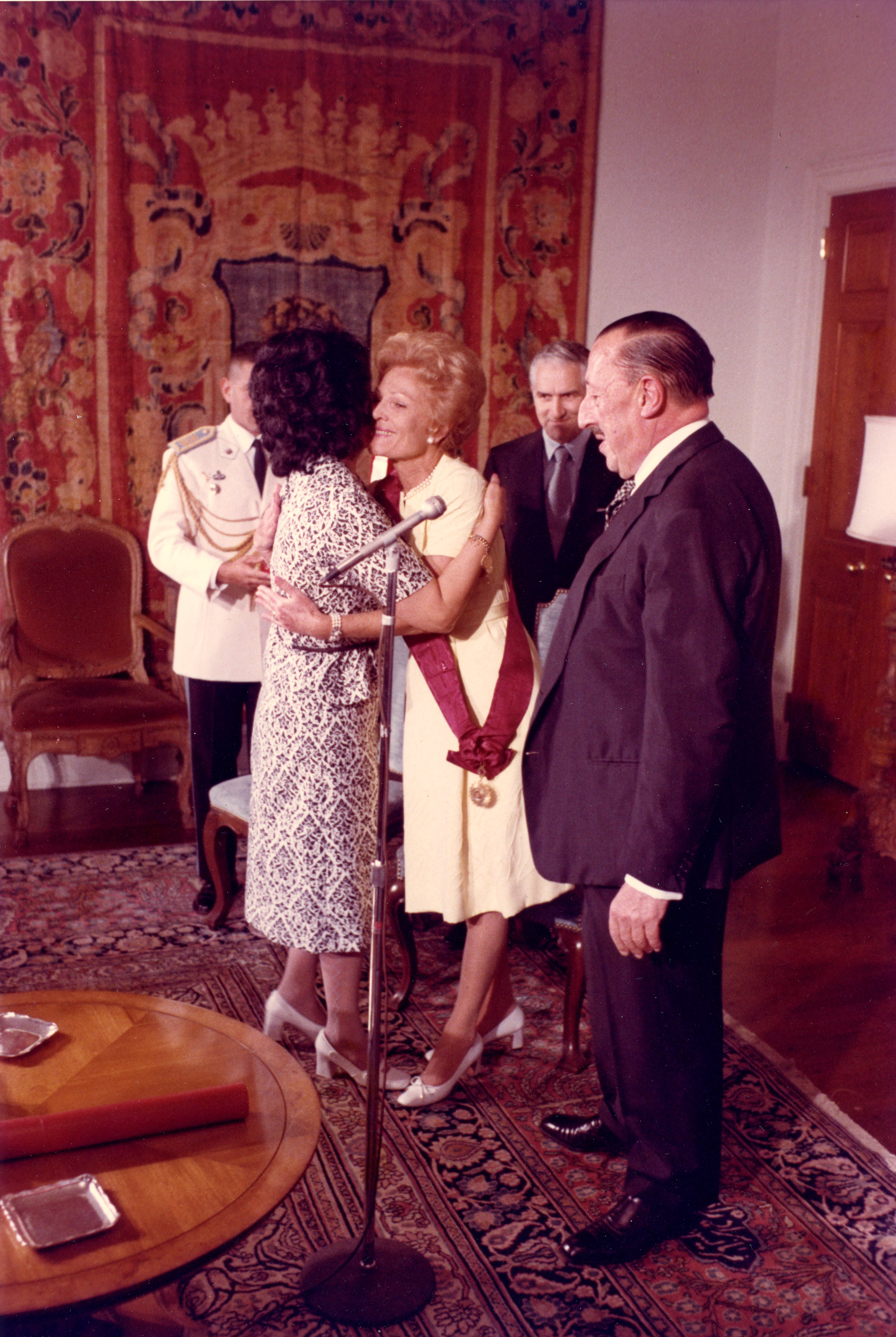
U.S. First Lady Pat Nixon is awarded the Grand Cross of the Order of the Sun for her efforts to deliver relief supplies after an earthquake in 1970. At left is Peruvian First Lady Consuelo Velasco; at right is the Peruvian Ambassador to the United States.

- Maricarmen Alva, Grand Cross (14 June 2023)
- Henry Harley "Hap" Arnold
- Fernando Belaúnde Terry, Grand Cross with Diamonds (20 July 1963)
- G. E. Berrios
- Herman Braun-Vega
- Leonid Brezhnev, Grand Cross with Diamonds (9 June 1978)
- Ernesto Burzagli
- Rosa Campuzano
- Arturo "Zambo" Cavero
- Nicolae Ceaușescu, Grand Cross with Diamonds (14 September 1973)
- Gerardo Chávez
- Chiang Kai-Shek
- Rafael Correa
- Roberto Dañino
- Plácido Domingo
- Friedrich Ebert, Grand Cross with Diamonds (1922)
- Francisco Estévanez Rodríguez
- Cristina Fernández de Kirchner
- Juan Diego Flórez
- Eduardo Frei, Grand Cross with Diamonds (13 November 1964)
- Frank Freyer
- Pietro Gasparri, Grand Cross with Diamonds (1922)
- Charles de Gaulle, Grand Cross with Diamonds (15 December 1969)
- Raphael Girard
- Pablo Grimberg Umansky
- Herbert Hervey, 5th Marquess of Bristol
- Thor Heyerdahl
- Guillermo Hillcoat
- Daisaku Ikeda
- Alexei Kosygin
- Sergey Lavrov
- Lee Hsien Loong
- Retno Marsudi, Grand Cross
- Antonio Fernando Lulli Avalos, Grand Cross
- Mahathir Mohamad
- George Marshall
- John McCain Sr.
- Paul McCartney
- Dmitry Medvedev
- Ramón Miranda Ampuero
- François Mitterrand, Grand Cross with Diamonds (9 October 1987)
- José Mujica
- Yasuhiro Nakasone
- Cristino Nicolaides
- Pat Nixon, Grand Cross with Diamonds (23 June 1971)
- Valentín Paniagua
- George Papandreou
- Alfredo Pareja Diezcanseco
- Carlos Andrés Pérez, Grand Cross with Diamonds (11 November 1976)
- Javier Pérez de Cuéllar, Grand Cross with Diamonds (29 March 1984)
- Eva Perón
- Marcelo Rebelo de Sousa
- Maria Reiche
- Ford O. Rogers
- María Rostworowski
- Manuela Sáenz
- Haile Selassie
- John F. Shafroth Jr.
- Sonoda Sunao
- Yma Sumac
- Fernando de Szyszlo
- Julio C. Tello
- Valentina Tereshkova
- Danilo Türk
- Donald Tusk
- Martín Vizcarra
- Somchai Wongsawat
- Gian Marco Zignago
- Anwar Choudhury
- Muhammad Yunus
- Anwar Ibrahim
- Luong Cuong
- Prabowo Subianto
- Marco Rubio
