= La Cruz del Viajero =

Coordinates: 12.078460°S 77.065048°W

La Cruz del Viajero (The Cross of the Traveller) is a monumental cross located in what now Pueblo Libre, a district of the city of Lima, Peru. It was erected in 1579 by Catholic missionaries. Travellers would stop at the cross to ask for protection on the road to the port of Callao, a route which was beset by bandits. In 1759 the cross was moved 100 metres from its original location to a plaza that bears its name on the corner of Torre Tagle and Julio C. Tello streets. Both José de San Martín and Simón Bolívar are said to have knelt before the cross.

The cross was declared a Cultural heritage of Peru in 1998.
