= Caujul District =

Coordinates: 10°48′21″S 76°58′44″W

Caujul
- District
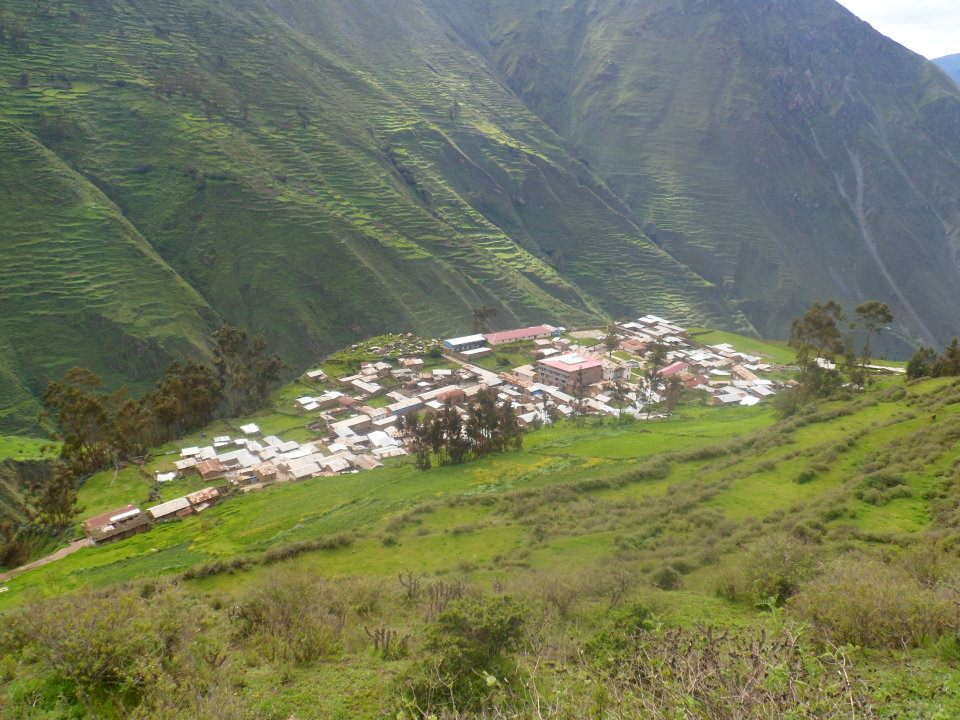
- The village of Caujul in the Oyón Province
- Interactive map of Caujul
- Country: Peru
- Region: Lima
- Province: Oyón
- Founded: January 30, 1871
- Capital: Caujul

Government
  - Mayor: Abel Salazar Ríos (2019-2022)

Area
  - Total: 105.5 km^{2} (40.7 sq mi)
- Elevation: 3,175 m (10,417 ft)

Population (2017)
  - Total: 576
  - Density: 5.46/km^{2} (14.1/sq mi)
- Time zone: UTC-5 (PET)
- UBIGEO: 150903

Caujul District is one of six districts of the province Oyón in Peru.

== See also ==
- Mataqucha
