= Gorgor District =

Coordinates: 10.6207°S 77.0412°W

Gorgor
- District
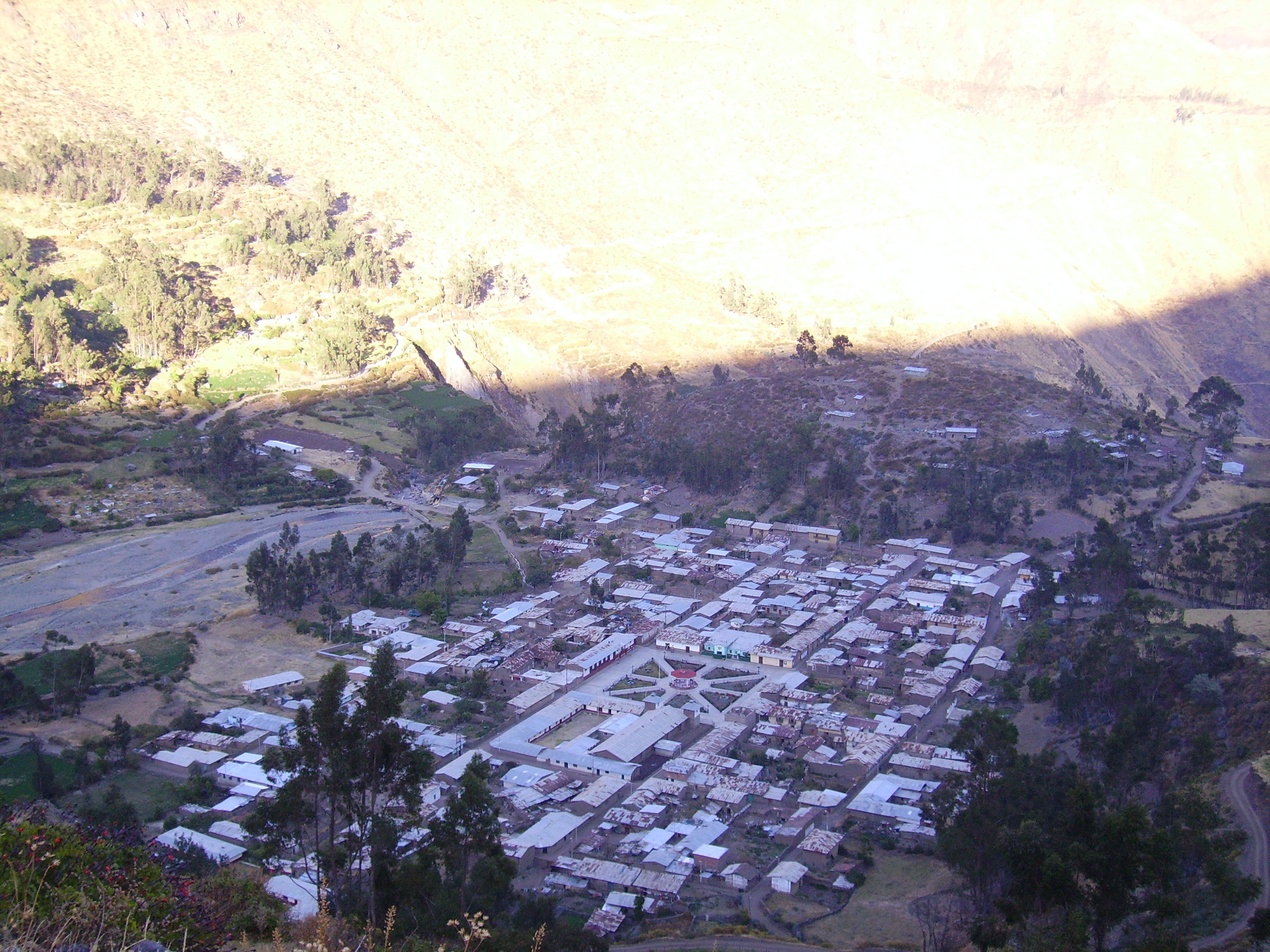
- Interactive map of Gorgor
- Country: Peru
- Region: Lima
- Province: Cajatambo
- Founded: January 2, 1857
- Capital: Gorgor

Government
  - Mayor: Hugo Diaz Ortega (2019-2022)

Area
  - Total: 309.95 km^{2} (119.67 sq mi)
- Elevation: 3,074 m (10,085 ft)

Population (2017)
  - Total: 1,672
  - Density: 5.394/km^{2} (13.97/sq mi)
- Time zone: UTC-5 (PET)
- UBIGEO: 150303

Gorgor District is one of five districts of the province Cajatambo in Peru.

== Geography ==
Some of the highest mountains of the district are listed below:

- Awkin
- Ch'ura
- Mataqucha
- Parya Ukru
- Puka Parya
- Punta Rukma
- P'ukru
- Q'ara Chuku
- Rukma
- Shawaq
- T'uruqucha
- Utkhush
- Wanchaq
- Waqra Punta
- Wathiyaqucha
- Yana K'uchu
