= Paccho District =

Coordinates: 10.9575°S 76.9330°W

Paccho
- District
- Interactive map of Paccho
- Country: Peru
- Region: Lima
- Province: Huaura
- Capital: Paccho

Government
  - Mayor: Jaime Floriano Granados Mejia

Area
  - Total: 229.25 km^{2} (88.51 sq mi)
- Elevation: 3,275 m (10,745 ft)

Population (2005 census)
  - Total: 2,079
  - Density: 9.069/km^{2} (23.49/sq mi)
- Time zone: UTC-5 (PET)
- UBIGEO: 150808

Paccho District is one of twelve districts of the province Huaura in Peru.
