= Julio C. Tello =

Peruvian archaeologist (1880 – 1947)

OSP Julio César Tello
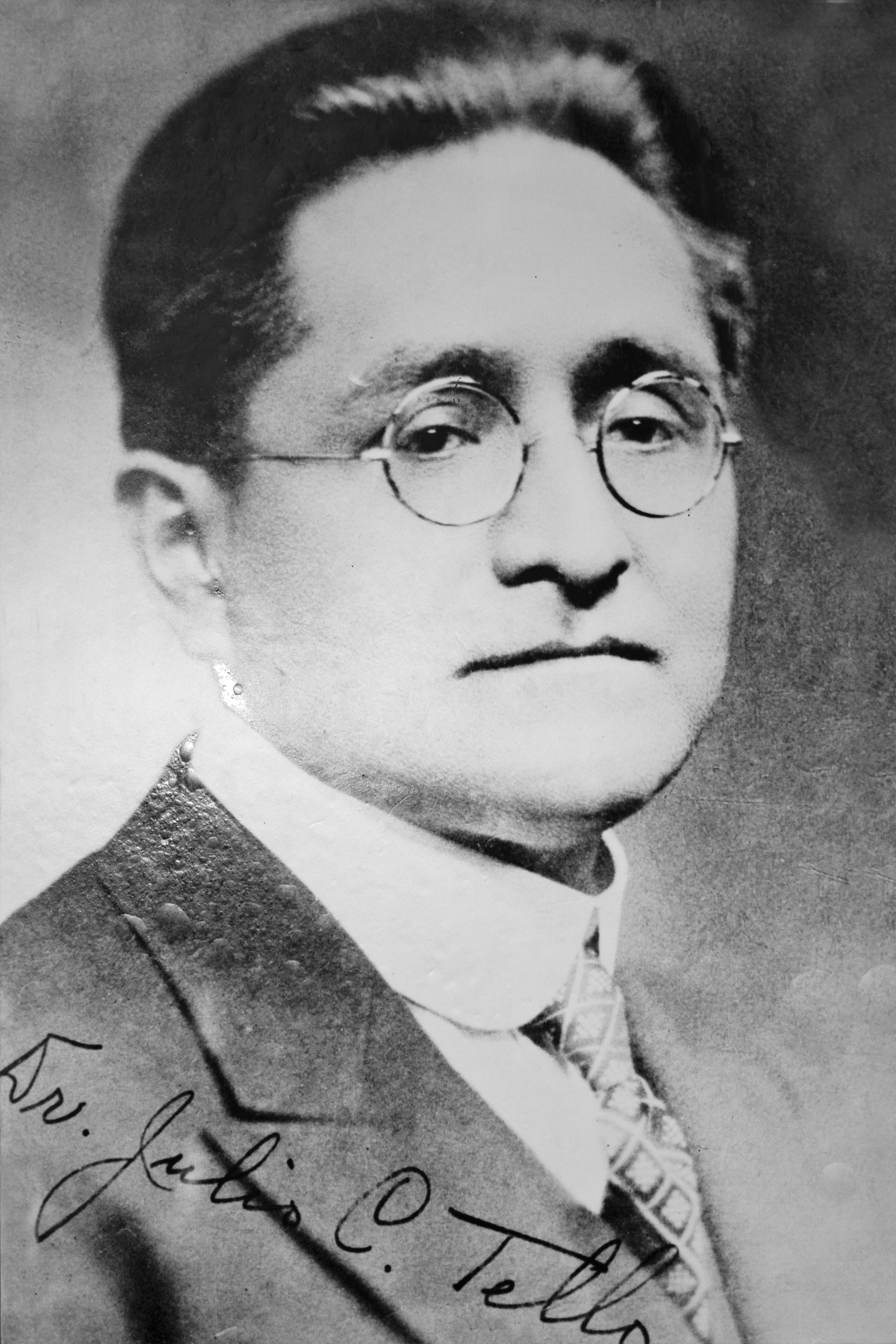
- Tello in his graduation portrait of Harvard University c. 1910
- Born: Julio César Tello Rojas; April 11, 1880; Huarochirí Province, Peru
- Died: June 3, 1947 (aged 67); Lima, Peru
- Known for: Discovering early Peruvian cultures, such as Paracas and Chavín
- Spouse: Olive Cheesman
- Honours: Order of the Sun of Peru

Academic background
- Education: Universidad Nacional Mayor de San Marcos; Harvard University

Academic work
- Discipline: Archaeology
- Institutions: National Museum of Anthropology and Archeology
- Notable students: Rebeca Carrión Cachot

Julio César Tello Rojas (April 11, 1880 – June 3, 1947) was a Peruvian archaeologist. Tello is considered the "father of Peruvian archeology" and was the first indigenous archaeologist in South America.

He made the major discoveries of the prehistoric Paracas culture, including nearly 400 textiles associated with mummified burials. He founded a national museum of archeology and served as its first director. In addition, he investigated Chavín de Huantar as the focus for his work in the Andean highlands, which he believed was significant for the development of ancient cultures in the region.

== Biography ==
Tello was born a "mountain Indian" in an Andean village in Huarochirí Province, Peru; his family spoke Quechua, the most widely spoken indigenous language in the nation. He gained a first-class education by persuading the Peruvian government to fund it. Tello completed his bachelor's degree in medicine at the National University of San Marcos in Peru in 1909.

While still a student, Tello studied the practice of trepanation among natives of Huarochirí, and amassed a very large collection of skulls. He was also studying early pathologies in the population. His collection became the basis for a collection at his university. His abilities were recognized early and senior men acted as mentors.

He was awarded a scholarship by Harvard University, where he learned English and earned his master's degree in anthropology in 1911. Next he went to Europe, where he studied archeology in Germany. In 1912 he attended the Congress of Americanists in England, a group in which he became prominent in later years. It was the beginning of his active international life.

Tello traveled widely during his career, and regularly invited other scholars to Peru, developing an international network of colleagues. Although Tello published a number of papers in his lifetime, they appeared in little-known journals and newspapers, so they were not well known then even to Spanish speakers. For some time his findings and theories were not widely known outside Peru, because he did not publish in recognized academic journals.

He collaborated with his student Rebeca Carrión Cachot, who also succeeded him as director of the National Museum of Anthropology and Archeology.

Apart from his seminal work on the discovery of the Paracas culture, as well as the Chavin culture, Tello's great contribution to archeology was his idea that pre-Columbian Andean culture emerged and developed in-situ. Max Uhle had argued that it was introduced from Mesoamerica. Since the late 20th century, Peruvian archeologist Ruth Shady and others have established that Caral-Supe, also known as Norte Chico, is the first civilization in the Americas, arising nearly 5,000 years ago.

== Marriage and family ==
In 1912 in England for a Congress of Americanists, Tello met Olive Mabel Cheesman, an English woman who was a student at London University. They married that year and returned to Peru, where they had several children together. Their eldest daughter died in December 1938.

== Career ==
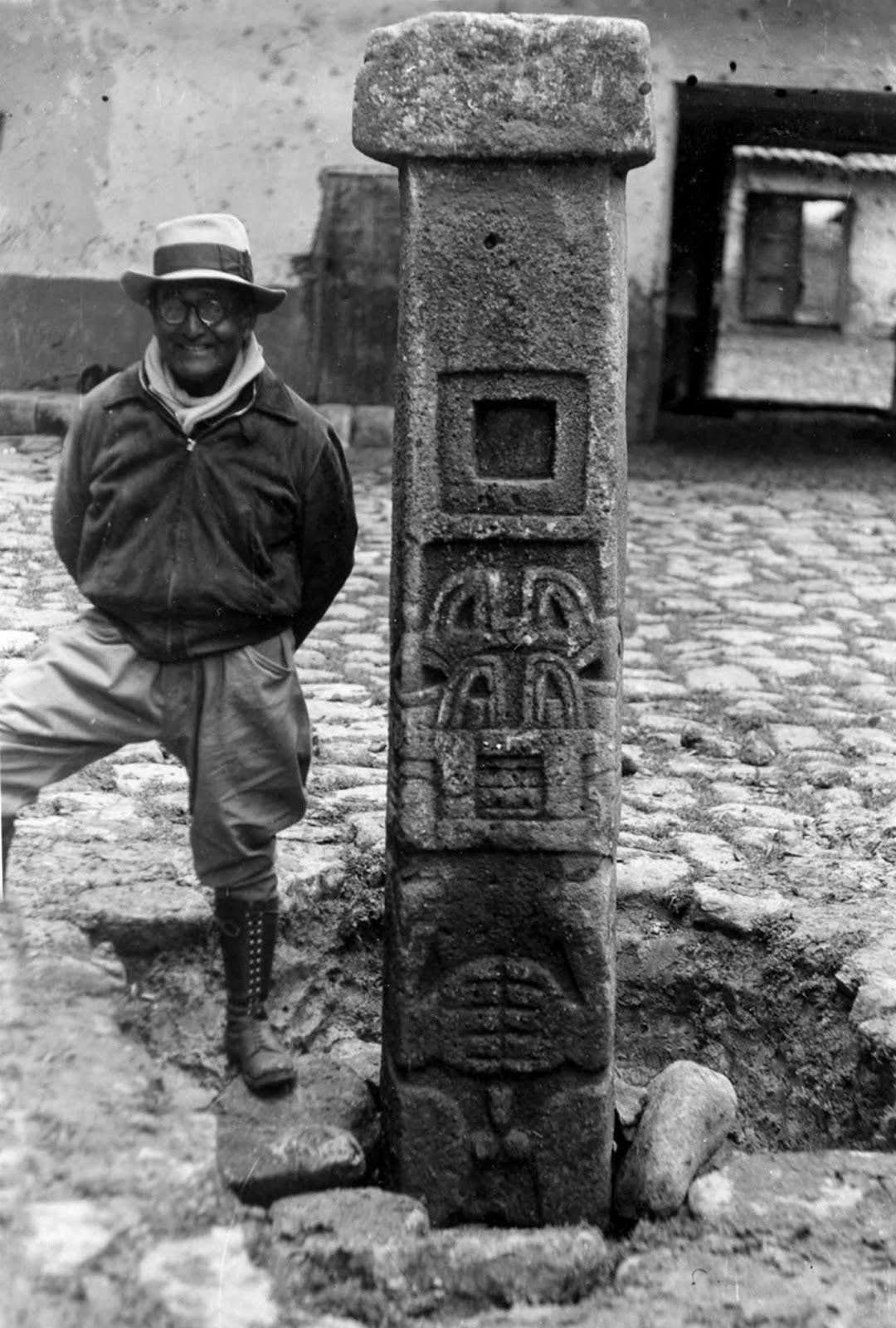
Tello during an archaeological expedition

In 1919 Tello was working with a team at the Chavín de Huantar archeological site, where he discovered a stele. (It has since been named for him, the Tello Obelisk.) Construction of the first temple at this major religious center was dated to 850 BCE. The work of Tello and others established that the site had been a center of a complex culture that lasted for several hundred years, to sometime between 500 and 300 BCE. Until late-20th century discoveries established the dates of the 5000-year-old Norte Chico site, the Chavín culture was believed to be the oldest complex civilization in Peru.

Tello is best known for his discovery in 1927 of 429 mummy bundles in the Cerro Colorado area of Peru on the Paracas Peninsula. He first visited the site on July 26, 1925. He was following a trail begun in 1915, when he had purchased ancient textiles in Pisco. On 25 October 1927, Tello and his team uncovered the first of hundreds of ceremonial mummified bundle burials.

Tello was the first in Peru to practice a scientific method of archeological excavation, to preserve stratigraphy and elements to establish dating and context. In 1928 the team began to remove the mummies and textiles for safekeeping. His findings and interpretations have been the most significant source of information regarding the Paracas culture, which dates to 750 BCE – 100 CE.

The necropolis contained ritual burials, in which corpses were placed in baskets in a sitting position. Each of the bodies was covered by large textiles, works of woven cotton that had been embroidered in wool to create elaborate designs. The arid climate had helped preserve the textiles. He discovered these textiles, which have been described as "spectacular". Tello and his team collected 394 textiles and gained funding from the Rockefeller Foundation for their preservation. They put more than 180 on display by 1938 at the Instituto de Investigaciones Antropologicas, where he and his team were on staff.

Unlike some of his colleagues, Tello long believed that the Andean highlands had been important centers of ancient culture. His study of this area was the focus of his work. His theory was proven by his work at sites such as Chavin de Huantar and Ayacucho, a center of Wari culture. In 1936 he, together with prominent scholars Alfred Kroeber, Samuel Lothrop, Wendell C. Bennett and others established the Institute for Andean Research (IAR), to organize and recognize contributions in the field.

In 1938 President Benavides approved a reorganization of the national museums. Impressed with the Paracas textile collection, he authorized the new Museo de Antropolgia to house it. On January 3, 1939, Tello was named its first director. This is now the Museo Nacional de Arqueología, Antropología e Historia del Perú.

The Julio C Tello Museum on the Paracas Peninsula is named in his honour. After the national marine reserve was established in 1975, the museum was built to house artifacts and interpret the archeology and culture of the Paracas, as well as the rich natural life of the marine reserve.

== Bibliography ==
- Tauro del Pino, Alberto: Enciclopedia Ilustrada del Perú. Tomo 16. TAB/UYU. Lima, PEISA, 2001. ISBN 9972-40-165-0
- Grandes Forjadores del Perú. Lima, Lexus Editores, 2000. ISBN 9972-625-50-8
- Burger, Richard, The Life and Writings of Julio C. Tello.America's First Indigenous Archaeologist. University of Iowa Press, 2010.

== Legacy and honors ==
- Considered the "father of Peruvian archeology".
- Richard L. Burger, The Life and Writings of Julio C. Tello, University of Iowa Press, 2009, makes his works and their significance available to a wider audience.
- Julio C. Tello Museum, named in his honor and established to hold his findings of the Paracas culture.
- Tello Obelisk, named in his honor, monument of the Chavín culture.

== See also ==
- Paracas Textiles
- Paracas culture
- Montegrande (archaeological site)
