= Leoncio Prado District, Huaura =

Coordinates: 11.0598°S 76.9297°W

Leoncio Prado
- District
- Interactive map of Leoncio Prado
- Country: Peru
- Region: Lima
- Province: Huaura
- Founded: January 30, 1953
- Capital: Santa Cruz

Government
  - Mayor: Maximo Saulo Carmin Barreto

Area
  - Total: 300.13 km^{2} (115.88 sq mi)
- Elevation: 3,278 m (10,755 ft)

Population (2017)
  - Total: 1,867
  - Density: 6.221/km^{2} (16.11/sq mi)
- Time zone: UTC-5 (PET)
- UBIGEO: 150807

Leoncio Prado District is one of twelve districts of the province Huaura in Peru.
