= San Ignacio, Honduras =

San Ignacio
- Municipality
- Location in Honduras
- Coordinates: 14°40′N 87°02′W
- Country: Honduras
- Department: Francisco Morazán

Area
  - Total: 333 km^{2} (129 sq mi)

Population (2015)
  - Total: 8,956
  - Density: 26.9/km^{2} (69.7/sq mi)

San Ignacio (Spanish pronunciation: [san iɣˈnasjo]) is a municipality in the Honduran department of Francisco Morazán.

== Notable people ==
- Luis Landa Escober (born 1875), academic, scientist and lawyer
