= National Museum of Archaeology, Anthropology and History of Peru =

Museum in Peru

Coordinates: 12°4′38″S 77°03′43″W

National Museum of the Archaeology, Anthropology, and History of Peru
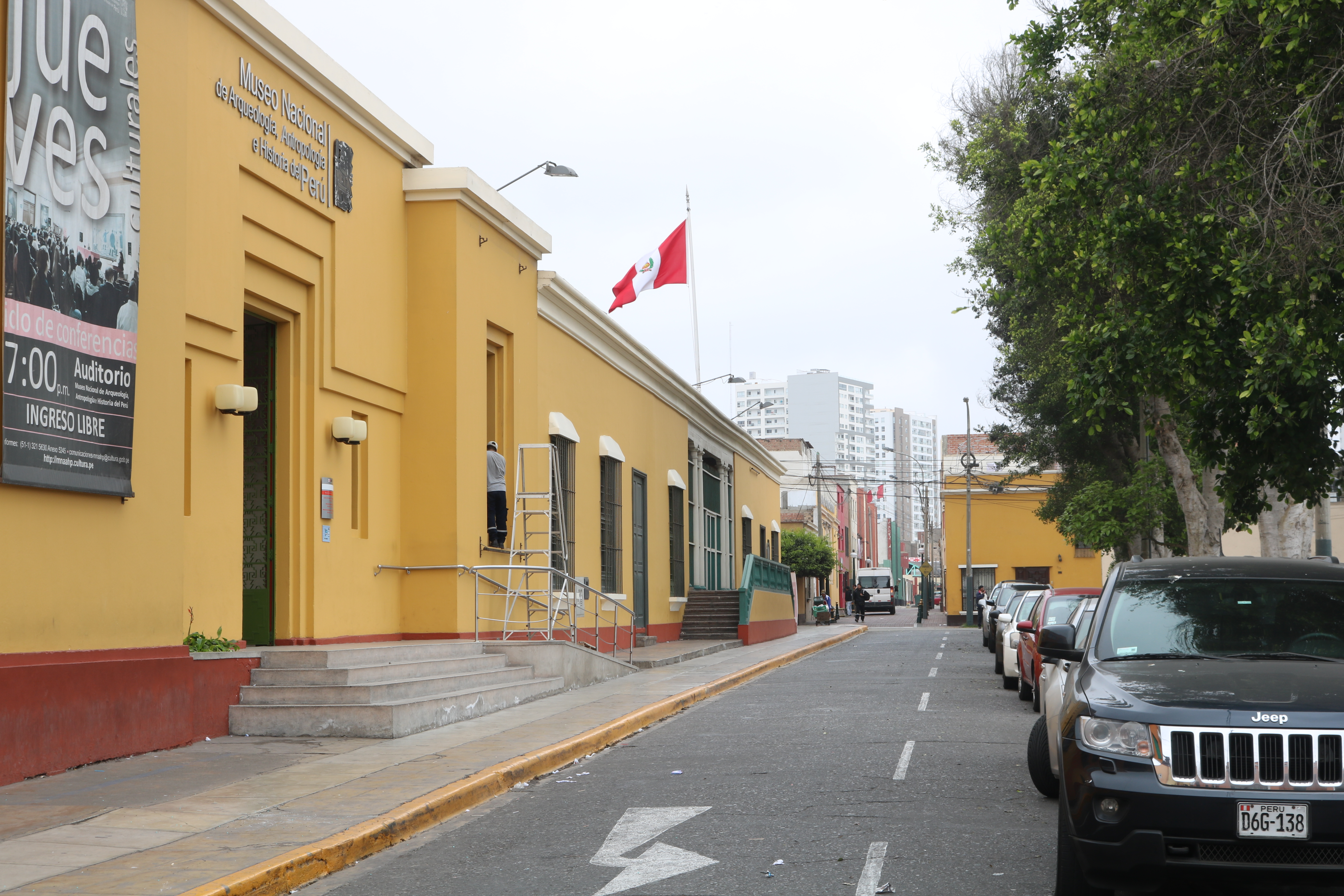
- Established: 1822
- Location: Lima, Peru
- Type: history
- Director: Sonia Guillén
- Website: mnaahp.cultura.pe

The National Museum of Archaeology, Anthropology, and History of Peru (Spanish: Museo Nacional de Arqueología, Antropología e Historia del Perú, MNAAHP) is the largest and oldest museum in Peru, housed at the Palacio de la Magdalena, located in the main square of Pueblo Libre, a district of Lima, Peru. The museum houses more than 100,000 artifacts spanning the entire history of human occupation in what is now Peru. Highlights include the Raimondi Stele and an impressive scale model of the Incan citadel, Machu Picchu. As of 2023, the museum is under restoration and very few rooms are open for visitors.

== History ==
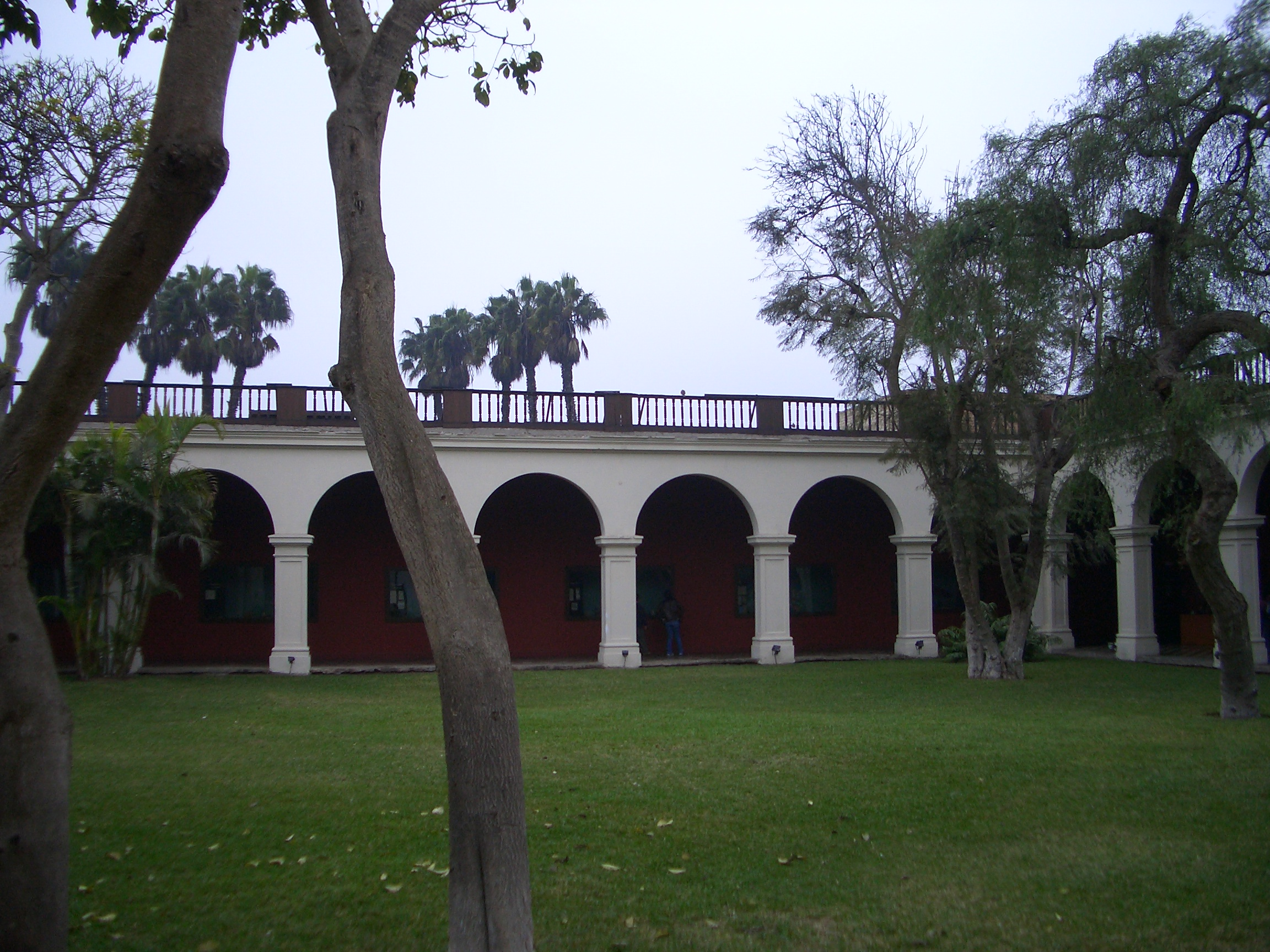
Courtyard of the National Museum

The National Museum of Peru (Spanish: Museo Nacional del Perú) was founded under the patronage of José de San Martín in 1822 by José Bernardo de Tagle, Bernardo de Monteagudo and Mariano Eduardo de Rivero y Ustáriz, who assumed the task of directing the project in 1826. Without a fixed location, The collection settled in various places until 1872, when it was exhibited in the main palace of the International Exhibition.

The first collection was made based on original archaeological excavations, donations and purchases of various pre-Hispanic objects. All of it, except the Raimondi Stele, disappeared as a result of looting during the occupation of Lima by Chilean troops during the War of the Pacific. Due to this, the Museum was dissolved as it did not have enough pieces for its exhibition.

On May 6, 1905, it was recreated under the name of Museum of National History (Spanish: Museo de Historia Nacional), with José Augusto de Izcue being appointed director, who hired the prestigious German archaeologist Max Uhle. Izcue was in charge of the colonial and republican area, while Uhle directed the pre-Hispanic themes. On July 29 of that year the new museum was inaugurated with the presence of President José Pardo y Barreda.

In 1911 Julio C. Tello assumed the archaeological area, with Emilio Gutiérrez de Quintanilla being director. By then the museum had a collection of more than 9,000 inventoried archaeological pieces, and an unestimated number of anthropological and historical objects. Due to disagreements between the director and Tello, the Archeology section became independent in 1924 as the Museum of Peruvian Archeology (Spanish: Museo de Arqueología Peruana), while the colonial and republican part adopted the name of the Bolivarian Museum (Spanish: Museo Bolivariano). Both museums, installed in the Magdalena Palace of Pueblo Libre, were inaugurated by President Augusto B. Leguía. While the pieces of the Bolivarian Museum were exhibited in the palace's premises, for the Museum of Archeology the facilities were modified, creating a new museum space by the Portuguese architect Raúl María Pereira. The Museum of Peruvian Archeology had a collection based on pre-existing archaeological pieces in the Museum of National History, to which the Larco collection was added. This was the collection of Víctor Larco Herrera, which President Augusto B. Leguía purchased from him in 1923 and formed, together with the Paracas de Tello collections, the basis of the collections of the current museum. Tello was in charge of increasing this collection based on excavations and archaeological research in various places in Peru, as well as appropriate restoration and conservation.

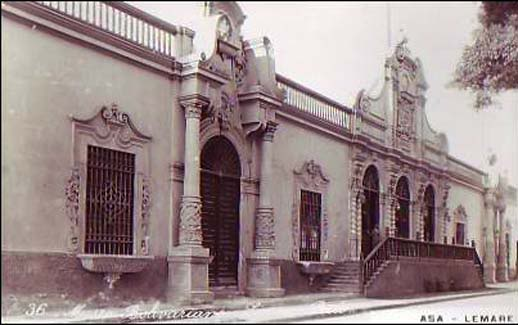
The Bolivarian Museum in 1930.

In 1930, Tello was dismissed. The Peruvian government decided to merge both museums, adopting the name with which it was born: National Museum (Spanish: Museo Nacional). One of the tasks of this institution, whose direction fell to Luis E. Valcárcel, was to supervise the creation of other museums in various cities in Peru. Another important task was the publication of a periodical magazine, the Revista del Museo Nacional, which was published continuously until 2001.

In 1945, at Tello's request, the newly established Superior Council of Museums once again divided the National Museum into the National Museum of Anthropology and Archeology (Spanish: Museo Nacional de Antropología y Arqueología), under the direction of Tello, and the National Museum of History (Spanish: Museo Nacional de Historia), with Valcárcel at the head. Both museums maintained their location in the palace.

In 1981 a robbery occurred at the Museum. Some thieves were able to bypass the security system and steal about 220 pieces of gold and silver, including the Tumi lambayeque.

Finally in 1992 they merged again, creating the current museum, and passing under the supervision of the now extinct National Institute of Culture. Among its directors are recognised intellectual personalities from Peru, such as Fernando Silva Santiesteban, Duccio Bonavia, Luis Guillermo Lumbreras, María Rostworowski and Franklin Pease.

== Collection ==
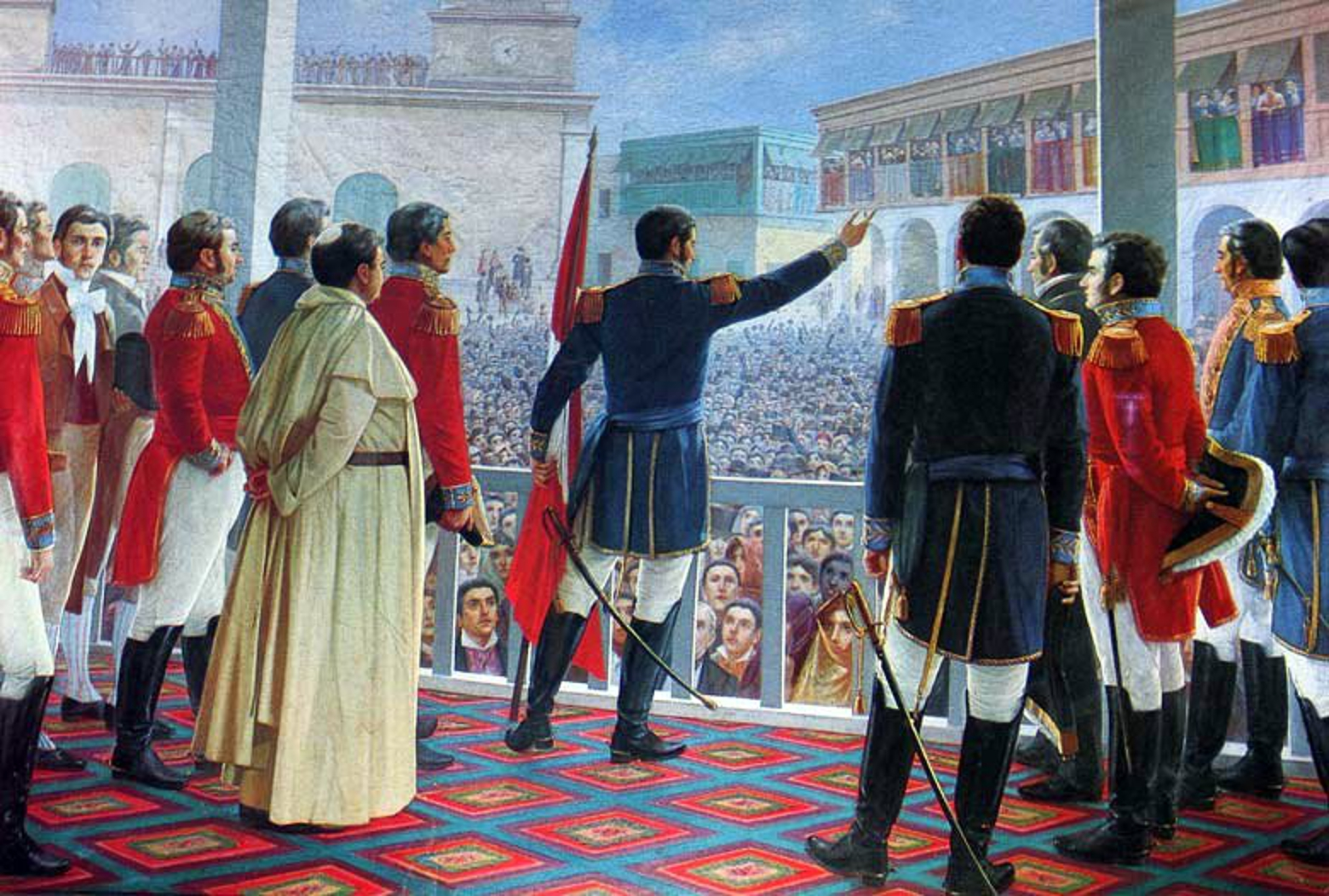
Juan Lepiani's Proclamación de la Independencia del Perú.

The MNAAHP has an enormous variety of historical cultural objects from Peruvian history, housing more than 300,000 pieces that cover the entire human occupation of what is now Peru. The museum's permanent exhibition occupies an area of 23,000 m^{2} spread across 30 rooms.

The importance and quality of the objects on display and stored in its museum reserves make it the most important museum in Peru. Among its most important treasures are the Crossed Hands of Kotosh, the Raimondi Stele of Chavín, the Tello Obelisk, mantles from Paracas, and various paintings from the viceregal period, mainly from the Cuzco School of painting, and from the Republican period, including works by some renowned painters such as José Gil de Castro.

== Former directors ==
- Rebeca Carrión Cachot
- Julio César Tello

== See also ==
- Museums in Lima
- Church of Santa María Magdalena (Lima), located nearby
