= Rebeca Carrión Cachot =

Peruvian archaeologist (1907 – 1960)

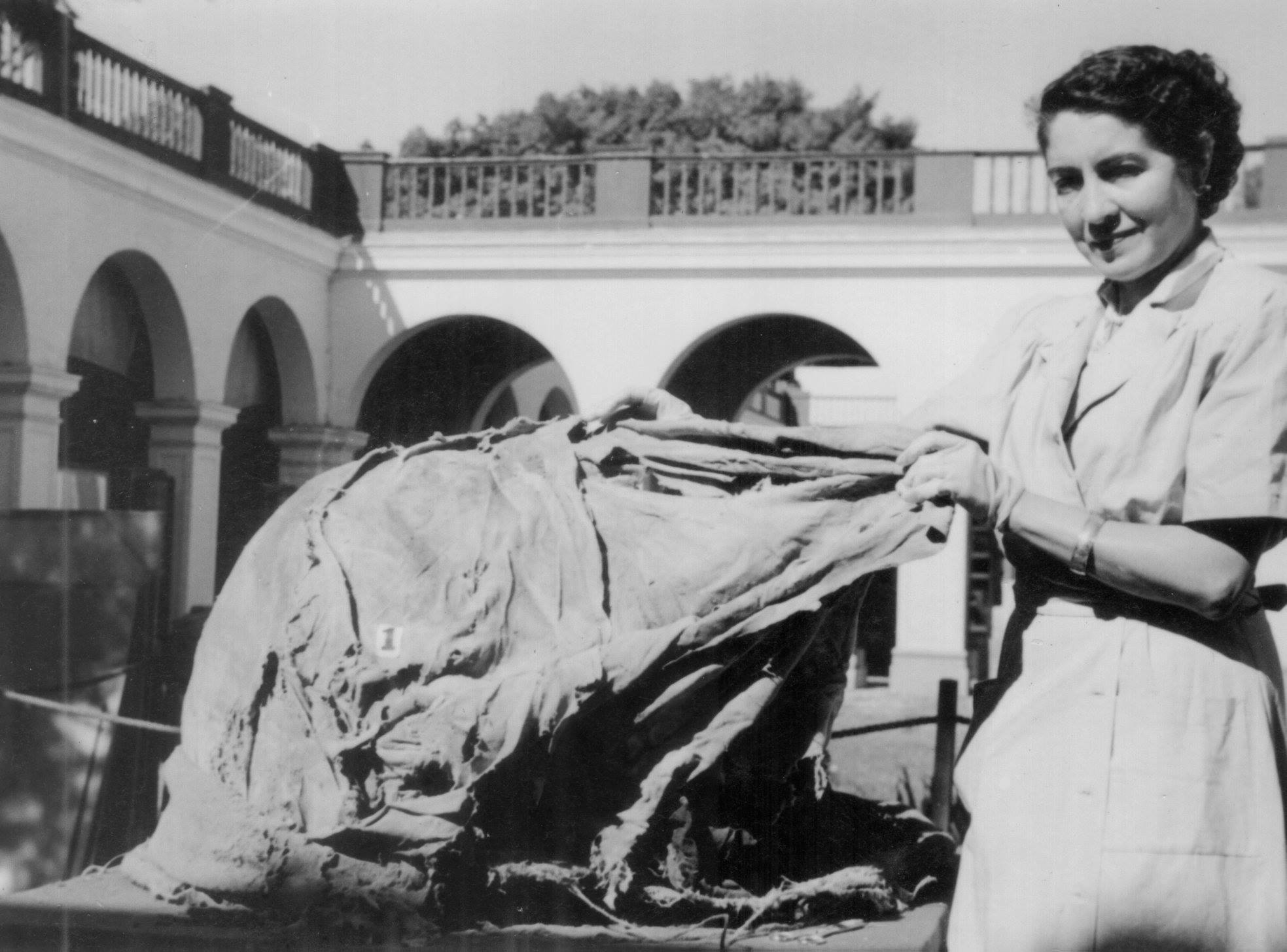
- Rebeca Carrión c. 1930
- Born: 18 December 1907; Lima, Peru
- Died: 6 April 1960 (aged 52); Guatemala city, Guatemala
- Occupations: Archaeologist, museum director
- Partner: Raphael Girard (m. 1955)
- Parent(s): Pedro José Carrión and Isabel Cachot

Academic background
- Education: National University of San Marcos

Academic work
- Discipline: Archaeology
- Institutions: National Museum of Archaeology, Anthropology and History of Peru

Rebeca Carrión Cachot (18 December 1907 – 6 April 1960) was a Peruvian archaeologist, historian and teacher, who had studied under Julio César Tello. She contributed significantly to the scientific research of various pre-Columbian cultures, including the Chavín and Paracas.

== Biography ==
Born on 18 December 1907, to Pedro José Carrión (a colonel of the Peruvian army) and Isabel Cachot (singer and composer), Carrión Cachot attended high school, where she was taught by Elvira García y García. She then pursued higher studies at the National University of San Marcos (UNMSN), where she graduated with a Bachelor of Letters in 1924. At that time she began to collaborate with Julio C. Tello in his archaeological research.

In 1928 she held the position of curator of the Museum of the National University of San Marcos. She received her doctorate in 1931, with a thesis entitled "The clothing in ancient Paracas". She taught at the UNMSM in the 1930s and 1940s, including chairing the course in Pre-Columbian Peruvian Art (1931 and 1946–1955), as well as Archaeology. At the Pontificia Universidad Católica del Perú she taught the course on the History of Peruvian Art. She was one of the first women to hold the university chair in Peru. She succeeded Tello as director of the National Museum of Anthropology and Archeology (1947–1955) and the Archaeological Museum of the University of San Marcos (1947–1955).

In 1949, she unwrapped the mummified person known as Paracas 49 on live television at the American Museum of Natural History. The remains were displayed there for 18 days in an exhibition entitled 'The Paracas Mummy'. This was the first time Carbon-14 dating was used on a Paracas individual's remains. During her career she also excavated at Kuntur Wasi and Ancón.

She died on 6 April 1960. Her remains were repatriated to be buried in the El Ángel Cemetery (es), Lima.

== Personal life ==
In 1955 she married the Swiss ethnologist Raphael Girard and she went on to reside in Guatemala city.

== Honours ==
- Ordre des Palmes Académiques
