= Hualmay District =

Coordinates: 11.0967°S 77.6129°W

Hualmay Walmay
- District
- Coat of arms
- Interactive map of Hualmay
- Country: Peru
- Region: Lima
- Province: Huaura
- Founded: December 6, 1918
- Capital: Hualmay

Government
  - Mayor: Crispulo Eddie Jara Salazar

Area
  - Total: 5.81 km^{2} (2.24 sq mi)
- Elevation: 22 m (72 ft)

Population (2005 census)
  - Total: 26,603
  - Density: 4,580/km^{2} (11,900/sq mi)
- Time zone: UTC-5 (PET)
- UBIGEO: 150805
- Website: munihualmay.gob.pe

Hualmay District is one of twelve districts of the province Huaura in Peru.
