= Palacio de la Magdalena (Peru) =

Cultural heritage site in Lima, Peru

Coordinates: 12.0774°S 77.0619°W

Magdalena Palace
- Palacio de la Magdalena
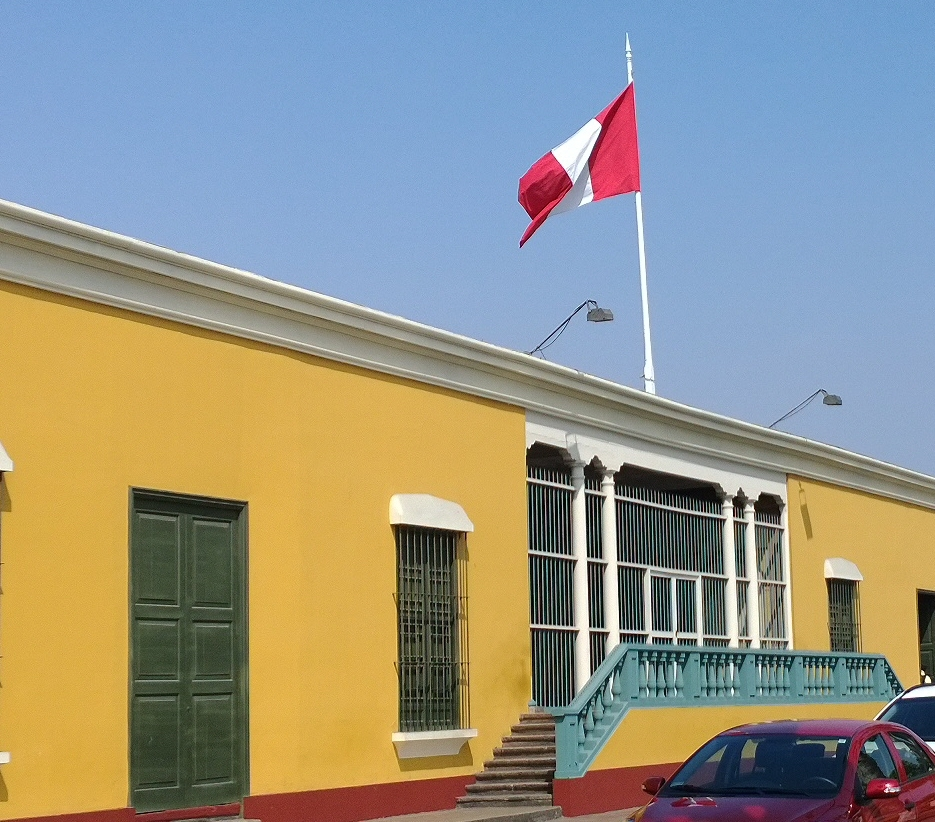
- The building in 2013
- Interactive map of the Magdalena Palace area
- Alternative names: Quinta de los Libertadores

General information
- Architectural style: Spanish colonial
- Location: La Magdalena, Peru
- Owner: Government of Peru; MNAAHP

The Palacio de la Magdalena (Spanish for Magdalena Palace) is a viceregal house located in the district of Pueblo Libre in Lima. It is located near the Plaza de los Libertadores, and is also known as the Quinta de los Libertadores. The building was declared a national monument in 1972.

== History ==
The building was the residence of the penultimate viceroy of Peru, Joaquín de la Pezuela, and is popularly known as Quinta de los Libertadores for having served as lodging for the Liberators José de San Martín and Simón Bolívar, who had the palace as their headquarters during the Peruvian independence campaign.

During the War of the Pacific it was the seat of the government of President Francisco García Calderón, the only national administration recognized by the Chilean Army during the occupation of Lima until late 1881.

== Description ==
The building is, next to the Casa Hacienda de Orbea, one of the most highlighted examples of colonial civil architecture in the district of Lima. Part of the adjacent land and some rooms of the residence were renovated to house the National Museum of Archaeology, Anthropology and History of Peru.

== See also ==
- Government Palace, the current seat of the government of Peru.
- Huaura Museum, where San Martín stayed and first proclaimed the independence of Peru before reaching Lima.

== Bibliography ==
- de la Puente Candamo, José Agustín (2008). Pueblo Libre: historia, cultura y tradición. Universidad Alas Peruanas. ISBN 978-9972-210-70-9.
