= Wamanripa (Huaura) =

Mountain in Peru

- Location within Peru

Highest point
- Elevation: 5,000 m (16,000 ft)
- Coordinates: 10°53′18″S 76°36′39″W

Geography
- Location: Peru, Lima Region, Huaura Province
- Parent range: Andes

Wamanripa (local name for Senecio or a species of it, also applied for Laccopetalum giganteum, hispanicized spelling Huamanrripa) is a mountain in the Andes of Peru, about 5,000 metres (16,404 ft) high. It is located in the Lima Region, Huaura Province, Santa Leonor District.
