= Q'asaqucha =

Lake in Lima, Peru

- Location within Peru
- Location: Lima Region
- Coordinates: 10°57′20″S 76°35′1″W
- Basin countries: Peru

Q'asaqucha (Quechua q'asa mountain pass, qucha lake, "mountain pass lake", Hispanicized spelling Casacocha) is a lake in Peru located in the Lima Region, Huaura Province, Santa Leonor District. It is situated south of the mountain Qata Warillu (Catahuarillo).
