= Elvira García y García =

Peruvian teacher (1862–1951)

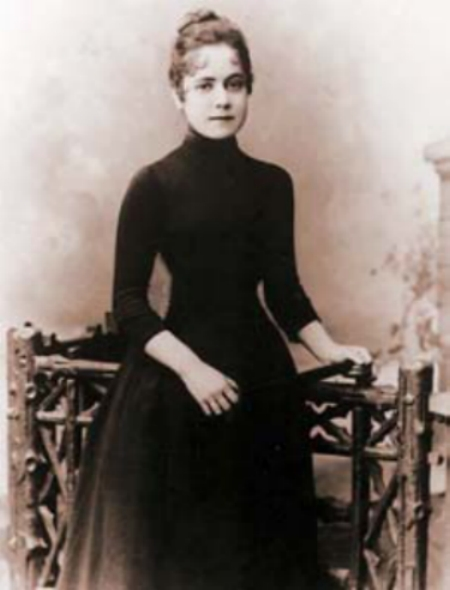
Elvira García y García

Elvira García y García (1862-1951) was a Peruvian educator and feminist.

== Biography ==
She founded the pioneer girls' school Liceo Peruano (1883) the leading feminist publication Liceo Fanning (1894-1914), and is regarded as a pioneer in women's education in Peru.

She was the daughter of Aurelio Garcia y Garcia, Rear-Admiral of the Peruvian Navy who was considered one of the "four aces" of Peru's incipient navy (along with Miguel Grau and Lizardo Montero Flores).

== Notable students ==
- Rebeca Carrión Cachot, archaeologist
