= Santiago Queirolo =

Santiago Queirolo (originally named Giacomo) was a Peruvian pisco producer based in Pueblo Libre, a district of Lima.

== History ==
Italian immigrant Santiago Queirolo Raggio arrived in Peru in the 1880s, joining the Italian community around Lima. Living in Pueblo Libre, then still little more than an agricultural town on the edge of Lima, he sold octopus and other seafood on the street before founding his tavern, Antigua Taberna Queirolo. Here he sold traditional Peruvian Creole food and bottles of wine and pisco from grapes grown on land he bought around Cañete, south of the city.

The liquor business grew, with Santiago Queirolo becoming a brand name for wines and spirits while the restaurant became only a side business.
