= Acain =

- Village
- Location in Peru
- Coordinates: 10°53′36″S 76°48′3″W
- Country: Peru
- Region: Lima Region
- Provinces: Huaura Province
- Time zone: UTC-5 (PET)

Acain is a village in Huaura Province, Peru. It lies at an altitude of 2197 metres. It is noted for its steep terracing. It lies roughly 14 kilometres by road from Churin in the northwest.
