= Ch'ura =

Mountain in Peru

- Location within Peru

Highest point
- Elevation: 5,084 m (16,680 ft)
- Coordinates: 10°40′08″S 77°04′51″W

Geography
- Location: Peru, Lima Region
- Parent range: Andes

Ch'ura (Quechua for a swamp with natural springs, Hispanicized name Churas) is a 5,084-metre-high (16,680 ft) mountain in the Andes of Peru. It is located in the Lima Region, Cajatambo Province, Gorgor District, and in the Huaura Province, Ambar District. Ch'ura lies northwest of Wanki and northeast of Waqra Punta at the end of the Phiru Uya valley.
