= Caleta de Carquin District =

Coordinates: 11.0918°S 77.6283°W

Caleta de Carquin
- District
- Interactive map of Caleta de Carquin
- Country: Peru
- Region: Lima
- Province: Huaura
- Founded: September 30, 1941
- Capital: Caleta de Carquin

Government
  - Mayor: Juana Rosa Ramos Ramos

Area
  - Total: 2.04 km^{2} (0.79 sq mi)
- Elevation: 14 m (46 ft)

Population (2005 census)
  - Total: 6,064
  - Density: 2,970/km^{2} (7,700/sq mi)
- Time zone: UTC-5 (PET)
- UBIGEO: 150803

Caleta de Carquin District is one of twelve districts of the province Huaura in Peru.
