= Chururu =

Mountain in Peru

- Location within Peru

Highest point
- Elevation: 5,010 m (16,440 ft)
- Coordinates: 10°58′16″S 76°36′38″W

Geography
- Location: Peru, Lima Region
- Parent range: Andes

Chururu (local name for a kind of flamingo (Phoenicoparrus jamesi, also applied for Phoenicoparrus andinus) also spelled Chururo) is a 5,010-metre-high (16,440 ft) mountain in the Andes of Peru. It is located in the Lima Region, Huaura Province, Santa Leonor District. It lies at the Yanama River southwest of Chururuyuq and west of Muruqucha.
