= Huaura District =

Huaura Wawra
- District
- Location of Huaura in the Huaura province
- Coordinates: 11°6′S 77°36′W
- Country: Peru
- Region: Lima
- Province: Huaura
- Founded: August 6, 1936
- Capital: Huaura

Government
  - Mayor: Jacinto Eulogio Romero Trujillo

Area
  - Total: 48,443 km^{2} (18,704 sq mi)
- Elevation: 67 m (220 ft)

Population (2017)
  - Total: 34,764
  - Density: 0.71763/km^{2} (1.8586/sq mi)
- Time zone: UTC-5 (PET)
- UBIGEO: 150806

Huaura District is one of twelve districts of the province Huaura in Peru.
