= Puka Parya =

Mountain in Peru

- Location within Peru

Highest point
- Elevation: 4,865 m (15,961 ft)
- Coordinates: 10°40′42″S 77°01′28″W

Geography
- Location: Peru, Lima Region
- Parent range: Andes

Puka Parya (Quechua puka red, parya reddish, copper or sparrow, Hispanicized spelling Puca Paria) is a 4,865-metre-high (15,961 ft) mountain in the Andes of Peru. It is situated in the Lima Region, Cajatambo Province, Gorgor District, and in the Huaura Province, Ambar District. Puka Parya lies northwest of Mataqucha and east of Wathiyaqucha.
