= Wathiyaqucha =

Mountain in Peru

- Location within Peru

Highest point
- Elevation: 4,965 m (16,289 ft)
- Coordinates: 10°40′39″S 77°02′27″W

Geography
- Location: Peru, Lima Region
- Parent range: Andes

Wathiyaqucha (Quechua wathiya roasted potatoes, a traditional dish, qucha lake, Hispanicized spelling Bateacocha) is a 4,965-metre-high (16,289 ft) mountain in the Andes of Peru. It is situated in the Lima Region, Cajatambo Province, Gorgor District, and in the Huaura Province, Ambar District. Wathiyaqucha lies between Wanki in the west and Puka Parya in the east.
