= Huaura province =

Province of Peru

Coordinates: 11°06′24″S 77°36′18″W

Huaura
- Province
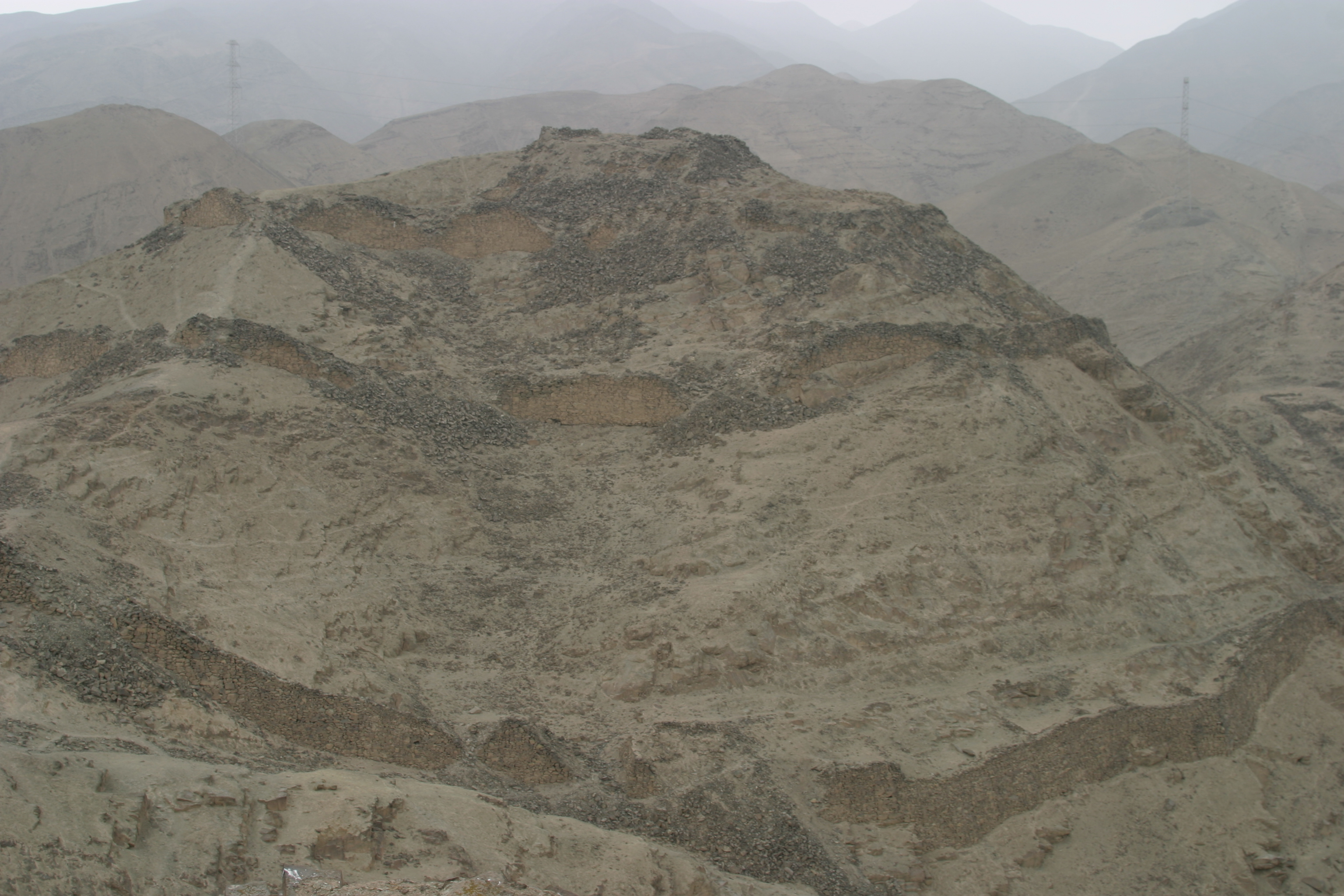
- The archaeological site of Acaray

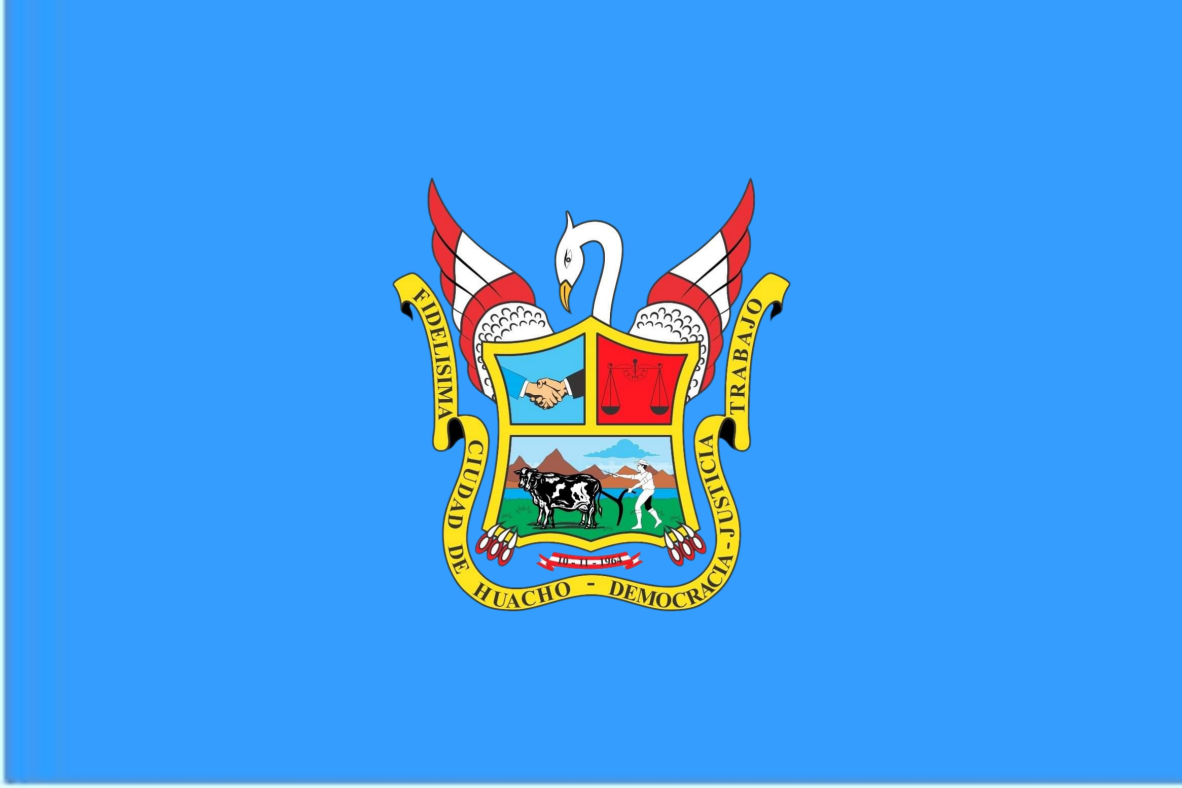
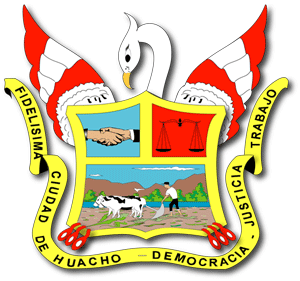
- Flag Coat of arms

- Location of Huaura in Lima
- Country: Peru
- Department: Lima
- Capital: Huacho

Government
  - Mayor: Crispulo Eddie Jara Salazar (2019-2022)

Area
  - Total: 4,891.92 km^{2} (1,888.78 sq mi)

Population
  - Total: 227,685
  - Density: 46.5431/km^{2} (120.546/sq mi)
- UBIGEO: 1501

Huaura is a province of the department of Lima, Peru. From the administrative point of view of the Catholic Church in Peru, it forms part of the Diocese of Huacho. Located on the Pacific coast of the country, it has a population of about 180,000 inhabitants. It is bordered by the province of Barranca and the Ancash Region in the north, the provinces of Cajatambo and Oyón and the Pasco Region in the east, the province of Huaral in the south and the Pacific Ocean in the west. Huacho is the capital of the province as well as the Regional Government of Lima.

== Geography ==
Some of the highest mountains of the province are listed below:

- Anta Chuku
- Anta Ñawin
- Chunta
- Churinqucha
- Chururu
- Chururuyuq
- Ch'ura
- Inka Pukyu
- Mankha Ukru
- Mataqucha
- Muruqucha
- Pachan Wallqa
- Pari Chuku
- Puka Parya
- Puka Tampu
- Phiri Uya
- Qawi
- Wamanripa
- Waqra Punta
- Wathiyaqucha
- Yana Uqhu
- Yuraq Allpa
- Yuraq Punta

== Political division ==
The 4,891.92 square kilometres (1,888.78 sq mi) is divided into twelve districts:

- Huacho (seat)
- Ambar
- Caleta
- Checras
- Hualmay
- Huaura
- Leoncio Prado
- Paccho
- Santa Leonor
- Santa María
- Sayán
- Vegueta

== Villages ==
- Acain

== See also ==
- Q'asaqucha
- Region Lima - Provinces
- Huacho
- Norte Chico
