= Chururuyuq =

Mountain in Peru

- Location within Peru

Highest point
- Elevation: 5,320 m (17,450 ft)
- Coordinates: 10°56′03″S 76°36′28″W

Geography
- Location: Peru, Lima Region
- Parent range: Andes

Chururuyuq (chururu local name for a kind of flamingo (Phoenicoparrus jamesi, also applied for Phoenicoparrus andinus) "the one with the chururu", Hispanicized spelling Chururuyo) is a 5,320-metre-high (17,450 ft) mountain in the Andes of Peru. It is located in the Lima Region, Huaura Province, Santa Leonor District. It lies northeast of Chururu.
