= Phiri Uya =

Mountain in Peru

- Location within Peru

Highest point
- Elevation: 5,015 m (16,453 ft)
- Coordinates: 10°41′24″S 77°07′00″W

Geography
- Location: Peru, Lima Region
- Parent range: Andes

Phiri Uya (Quechua phiri destroyed, uya face, "destroyed face", Hispanicized names Piriuya, Piríuyac) is a 5,084-metre-high (16,680 ft) mountain in the Andes of Peru. It is located in the Lima Region, Huaura Province, Ambar District. Phiri Uya lies at the Phiru Uya valley, southwest of Waqra Punta.
