= Pueblo Libre District, Lima =

District in Lima, Peru

Pueblo Libre
- District
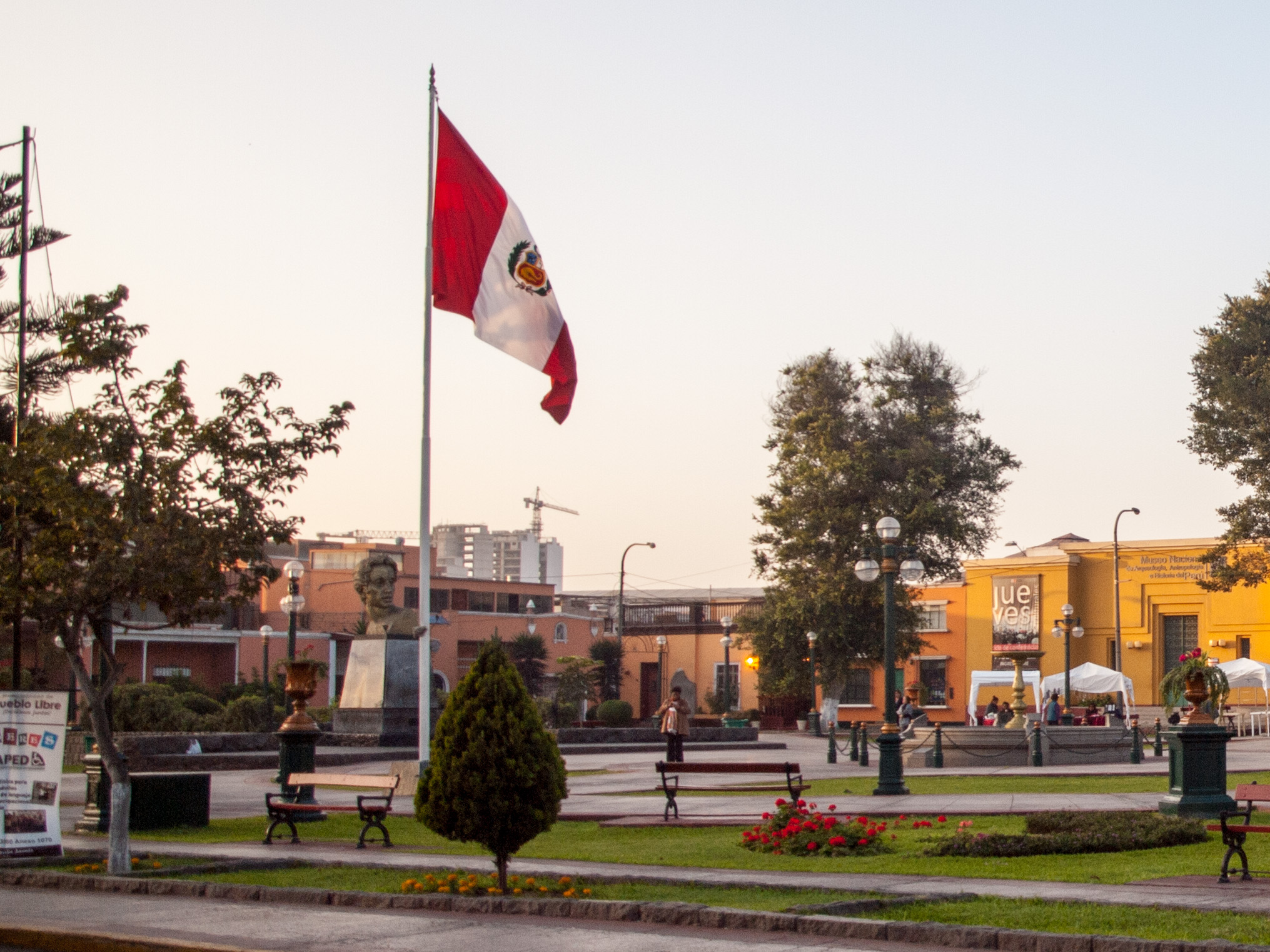

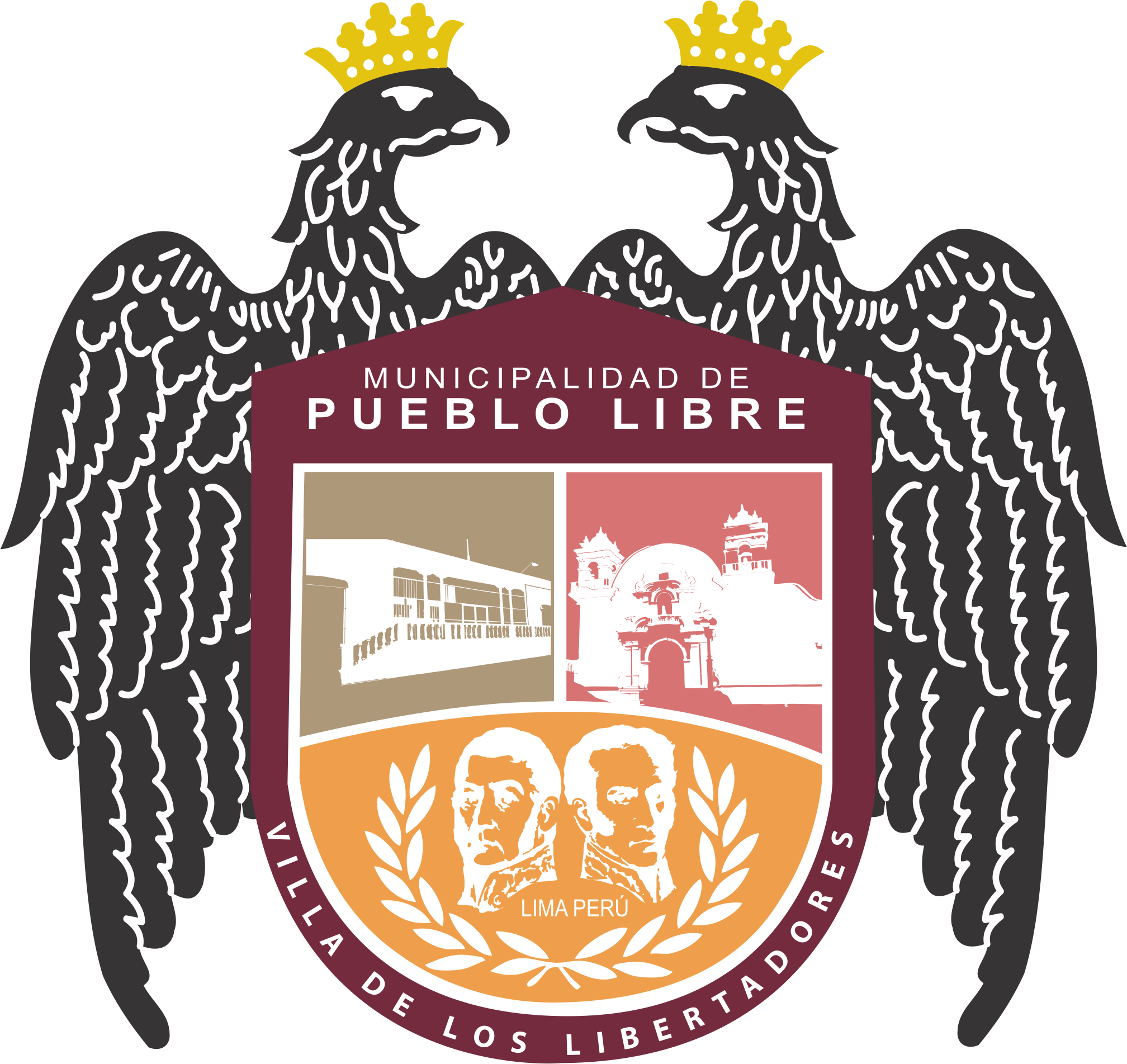
- Coat of arms

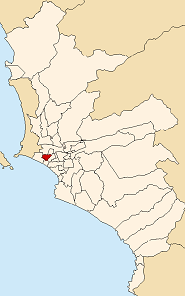
- Location in Lima Province
- Coordinates: 12°4′13″S 77°03′45″W
- Country: Peru
- Department: Lima
- Province: Lima
- Created: November 5, 1940
- Capital: Pueblo Libre
- Subdivisions: 1 populated centre

Government
  - Mayor: Mónica Rossana Tello López (2023-2026)

Area
  - Total: 4.38 km^{2} (1.69 sq mi)
- Elevation: 90 m (300 ft)

Population (2023)
  - Total: 99,591
  - Density: 22,700/km^{2} (58,900/sq mi)
- Time zone: UTC-5 (PET)
- UBIGEO: 150121
- Website: muniplibre.gob.pe

Pueblo Libre (Spanish: [ˈpwe.βlo ˈli.βɾe]; lit. 'free village') is a district of Lima, Peru. Created by Law 9162 of November 5, 1940, it is a middle-class residential district and has the most parks in Lima, also housing several branches of banks, local private universities and major corporations. Its name was granted by José de San Martín on April 10, 1822, as a recognition of the patriotism shown by its inhabitants during the Peruvian War of Independence.

== Name ==
The district was originally known as La Magdalena, also known as Magdalena Vieja (lit. 'Old Magdalena') to differentiate it from Magdalena Nueva, since 1672 in honour of Mary Magdalene. This name was granted to the Indian reduction located there, and was renamed following the Peruvian War of Independence. Its new name—originally El pueblo de los libres (lit. 'the village of the free')—was granted by José de San Martín on July 8, 1821, and made official by the Marquess of Torre Tagle on April 10, 1822.

== History ==
Pueblo Libre was founded in 1557 as Magdalena Vieja, before being renamed the Pueblo de los Libres in 1821 by José de San Martín. The name was given because of the great patriotism and desire for freedom San Martin saw from the people. Simón Bolívar, one of the liberators of South America, lived in Pueblo Libre. His colonial mansion is known today as the Palacio de la Magdalena, which houses the National Museum of Archaeology, Anthropology and History of Peru, having formerly housed the Magdalena government of Peru during the War of the Pacific. The Museum, also known by its initials MNAAHP, has collections of artifacts from Peruvian culture. It is one of the most visited museums in Lima and it is located at the heart of the district. Pueblo Libre has a rich history - museums, famous restaurants, and art galleries which are located in this district of Lima.

One of Pueblo Libre's oldest attractions is La Cruz del Viajero (The Cross of the Traveler). The cross was a symbol of faith and protection the conquistadores brought from Spain. Francisco Pizarro placed the cross in Pueblo Libre; soldiers would pray before going to war or when making a hard distant journey.

Situated not a long walk from Pueblo Libre's plaza is the Museo Larco Hererra, which houses a large collection of Moche artifacts. It offers Paracas textiles and collection of pottery. In the history section of the museum, it documents of the brutality of the Spaniards in the country and of the challenges it has faced since its independence.

On December 15, 2019, two teenage employees died when they were doing cleaning chores in a McDonald's restaurant in the district, across the street from Plaza San Miguel, a popular shopping centre. The event caused nationwide outrage, and the restaurant was ultimately closed permanently.

== Local landmarks ==
In addition to the National Museum of Archaeology, Anthropology, and History of Peru, the Larco Museum, and the Cross of the Traveler, Pueblo Libre features several other notable cultural and historical landmarks:

=== Mateo Salado Archaeological Complex ===
The Mateo Salado Archaeological Complex, also known as the Huacas of Mateo Salado, is a pre-Columbian huaca or ceremonial center attributed to the Ychsma culture (c. 1100–1450 CE). Located near the district's northern boundary, the site comprises five adobe pyramids and is considered one of Lima's most significant archaeological remains. Restoration and conservation efforts have been ongoing since the early 2000s.

=== Plaza de la Bandera ===
The Plaza de la Bandera, also called as Flag Square is a monumental square dedicated to the Peruvian flag. It is frequently used for patriotic ceremonies and public commemorations, reflecting the district's strong ties to Peru's independence history.

=== Santiago Queirolo Tavern ===
The Santiago Queirolo Tavern, also known as the Antigua Taberna Queirolo, is one of Lima's most traditional taverns. Established in the late 19th century, it is renowned for its pisco, wines, and classic Peruvian cuisine. The tavern remains a popular gathering place for locals and visitors, preserving the ambiance of Lima's historic cantinas.

== Geography ==
The district has a total land area of 4.38 km^{2}. Its administrative center is located 90 meters above sea level. It is part of Lima's Cono Centro, an unofficial subregion of the city.

=== Boundaries ===
- North: Lima and Breña
- East: Jesús María
- South: Magdalena del Mar
- West: San Miguel

=== Climate ===
Climate data for Lima
Month	Jan	Feb	Mar	Apr	May	Jun	Jul	Aug	Sep	Oct	Nov	Dec	Year
Record high °F	79	79	79	75	72	68	66	64	66	68	72	75	72
Record high °C	26	26	26	24	22	20	19	18	19	20	22	24	22
Average precipitation days	1	1	0	0	1	2	3	3	3	2	2	0	16
Average rainy days	4	2	3	2	5	11	12	15	13	7	5	3	82
Average relative humidity (%)	85	80	80	85	85	85	85	85	85	85	85	85	84.2
Mean monthly sunshine hours	179.1	169	139.2	184	116.4	50.6	28.6	32.3	37.3	65.3	89	139.2	1,284
Source: Weatherbase (Temperature, precipitation and humidity). and Universidad Complutense de Madrid (Sunlight)

== Demographics ==
According to the Census 2017 by the INEI, the district has 83,323 inhabitants.

== See also ==
- Administrative divisions of Peru
