= Luis Landa Escober =

Honduran scientist and lawyer (1875-1977)

Luis Landa Escober (December 28, 1875 – 1977) was a Honduran academic, scientist and lawyer.

Escober was born in San Ignacio, Cedros on 28 December 1875.

Escober was known for his papers on nature, botany, chemistry and the natural sciences. A member of the Society of Geography and History of Honduras, he was given several awards for his work in Honduras, including the Order of José Cecilio del Valle.

He lived to become a centenarian, dying at the age of 102 in 1977.
