= Lauricocha province =

Lauricocha
- Province
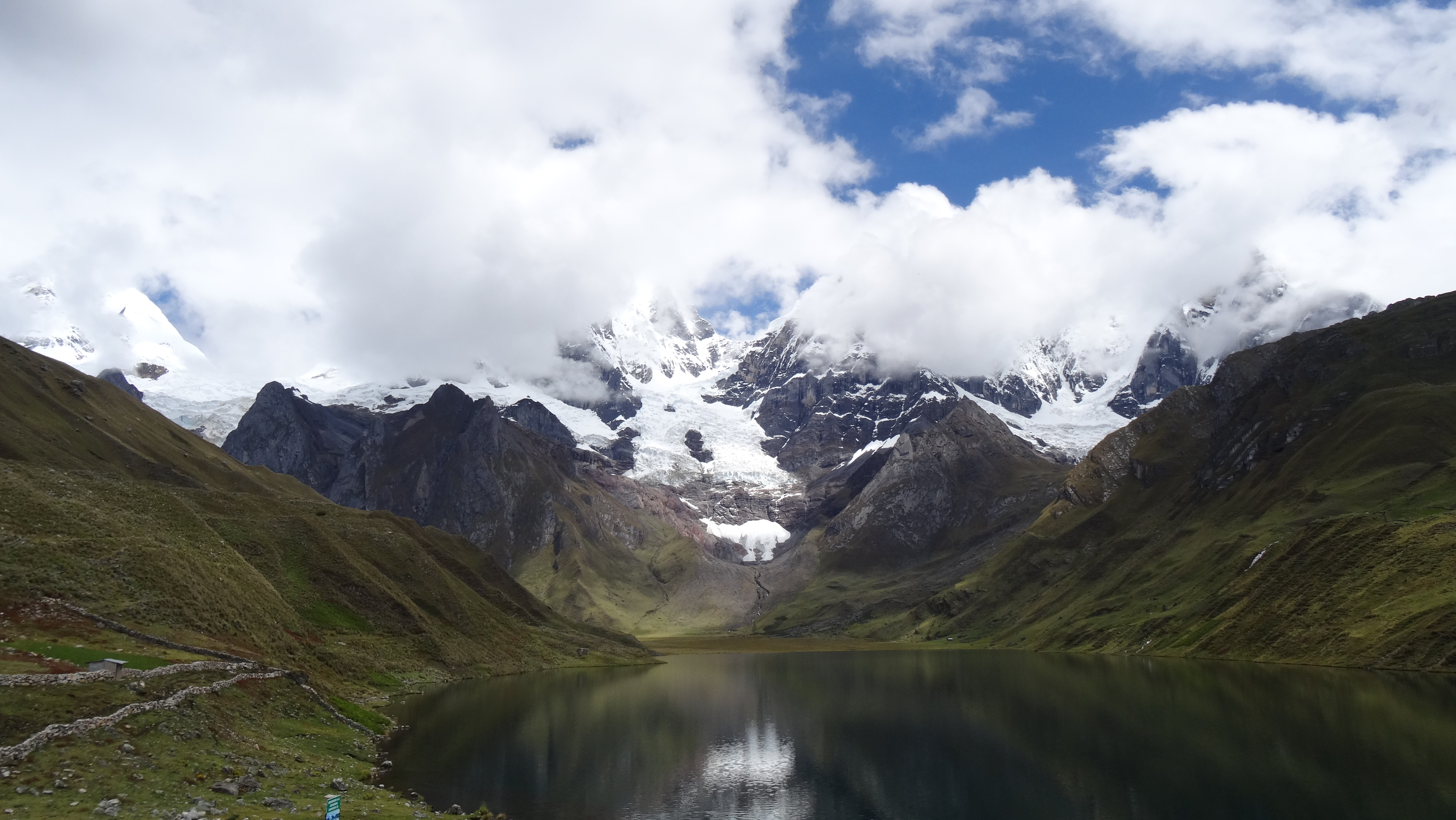
- The northeastern side of the Huayhuash range as seen from Lake Carhuacocha

- Flag

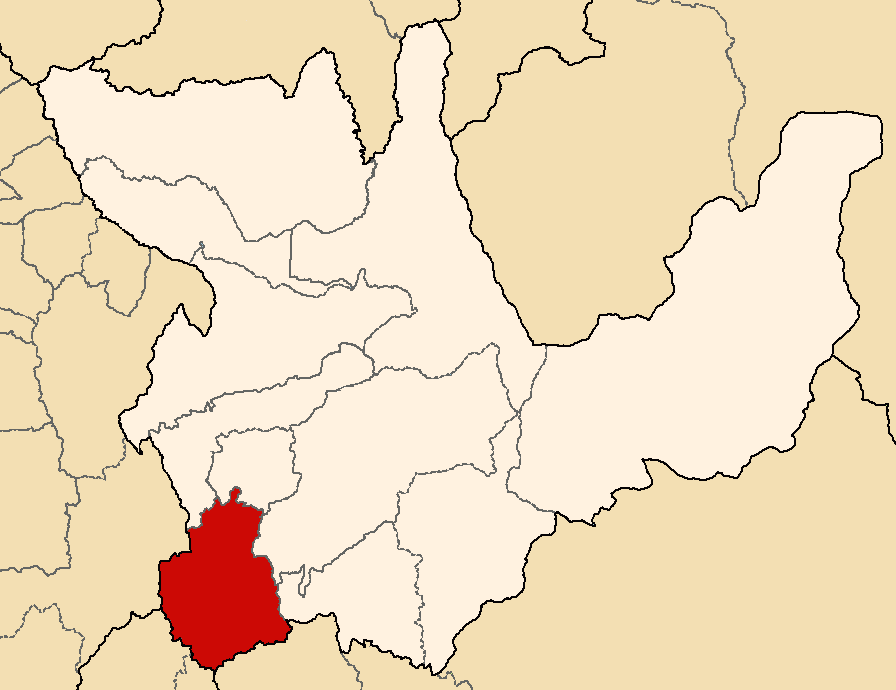
- Location of Lauricocha in the Huánuco Region
- Country: Peru
- Region: Huánuco
- Capital: Jesús

Area
  - Total: 1,860.13 km^{2} (718.20 sq mi)

Population
  - Total: 19,956 (2,017)
  - Density: 10.728/km^{2} (27.786/sq mi)
- UBIGEO: 1010

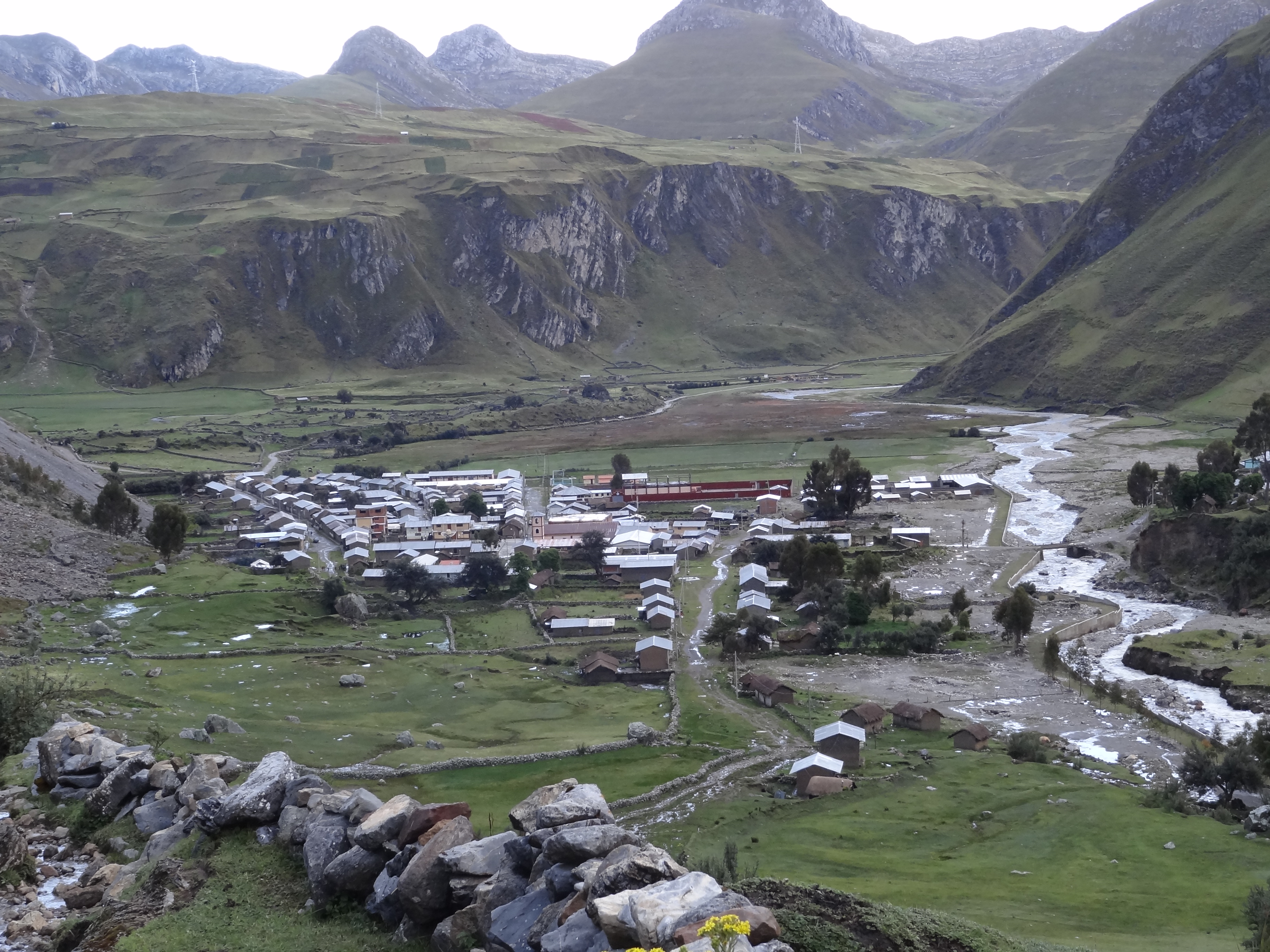
Queropalca

Lauricocha is one of 11 provinces of the Huánuco Region in Peru. The capital of the province is Jesús. The province is found at high elevations in the Andes. The highest elevation in the province is snow-capped Yerupaja peak with an elevation of 6,617 m (21,709 ft) and the lowest elevation is approximately 3,200 m (10,500 ft) along the Marañon River north of the town of Rondos. The population of the province was 19,956 in 2017 and had been declining for many years before that.

Lauricocha province is the source of the Marañon. Lauricocha Lake is the largest of many glacial lakes in the province. The lake and the headwaters of the Lauricocha and Nupe Rivers have been identified as among the sources of the Amazon River. The high, cool climate of the province limits economic activity. Agriculture is mostly pastoral and potatoes are the main crop. The Raura mine, producing copper, lead, silver, and zinc, is one of the highest mines in the world at an elevation of 4,791 m (15,719 ft). The province is popular for hikers and mountain climbers, especially to hike and climb in the Cordillera Huayhuash on the western border of Lauricocha. The major north-south Inca road, the Qhapaq Ňan, which runs from Cuzco to Quito, Ecuador, traverses Lauricocha province and is well-preserved along much of its route in this province.

== Location ==
The province is bordered by the provinces of Dos de Mayo and the Yarowilca in the north, the provinces of Huánuco and Ambo in the east, the Pasco Region in the south, and the Lima Region and the Ancash Region in the west.

== Geography ==
The Huayhuash or Waywash mountain range and the Rawra or Raura mountain range form the western border of the province. The highest peak of the province is Yerupaja. Other mountains are listed below:

- Allpa Pukyu
- Allpa Qutu
- Allqay
- Anka Wachaq
- Arpa Qaqa
- Atuq Wayin
- Chakraqucha
- Chawpi Hanka
- Chinkana
- Chuku Raqra
- Ch'uspiqucha
- Hamp'atu
- Jirish Hanka
- Kasha
- Kunkan
- Kunkayuq
- Kuntur Pata
- Kuntur Wachanan
- Kuntur Waqanan
- Kuraw
- Kushur Palla
- K'ark'a Pata
- Llamt'a
- Millpu
- Minaq
- Misa Pata
- Mit'urahu
- Nina Qaqa
- Parya
- Pata Wasin
- Pawqar Marka
- Pinqullu
- Puka Qucha
- Parya Qayqu
- Pukyu
- Puskan T'urpu
- Puywanqucha
- Phaqcha
- Qayqu
- Quraw
- Runtuy
- Saywa Punta
- Siqi
- Siula
- Tuna Wayi
- T'uyu Hirka
- Waka Qaqa
- Wamanripa
- Wank'a Marka
- Waraqayuq
- Wiru Wiru
- Yana Chaka
- Yana Chukchu
- Yana Hirka
- Yana Phaqcha
- Yarupaqa

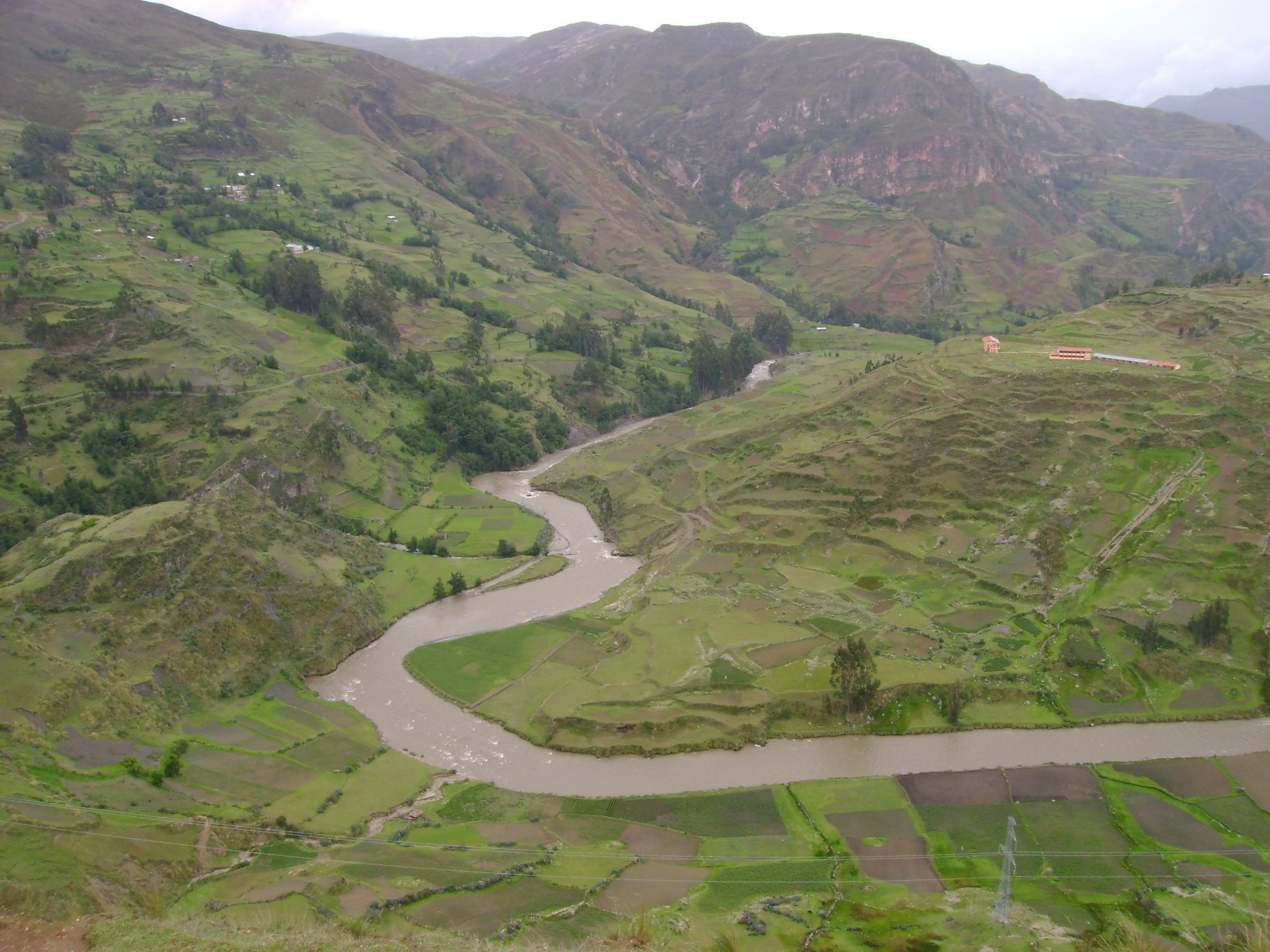
The Marañon River in Lauricocha province.

=== Climate ===
Climatic information about the province of Lauricocha is available for Rondos and San Miguel de Cauri. The climate of Lauricocha is cool and cloudy. In the Köppen Classification system, elevations below about 3,500 metres (11,500 ft) are usually Cfb climates (temperate, cool summers) or Cwb (temperate, cool summers, dry winters). At higher elevations, the climate is ET (Alpine tundra). At elevations of 3,500 m (11,500 ft), average monthly temperatures hover around 10 °C (50 °F) for every month of the year. Annual precipitation is about 850 millimetres (33 in). The permanent snowline in the Huayhuash and Raura mountains is about 5,000 metres (16,000 ft).

== Political divisions ==
Districts of the province of Lauricocha

Lauricocha Province is divided into seven districts (Spanish: distritos, singular: distrito), each of which is headed by a mayor (alcalde):

Districts of Lauricocha Province
District	Capital	Area	Population (1993)	Population (2017)	elevation (of capital)	coordinates (of capital)
Baños	Baños	192.1 km^{2} (74.2 sq mi)	3,298	2,086	3,409 m (11,184 ft)	10.075°S 76.375°W
Jesús	Jesús	455.8 km^{2} (176.0 sq mi)	7,157	4,362	3,486 m (11,437 ft)	10.034°S 76.582°W
Jivia District	Jivia	62.08 km^{2} (23.97 sq mi)	2,027	1,062	3,351 m (10,994 ft)	10.023°S 76.681°W
Queropalca	Queropalca	132.3 km^{2} (51.1 sq mi)	589	1,055	3,831 m (12,569 ft)	10.183°S 76.861°W
Rondos	Rondos	172.7 km^{2} (66.7 sq mi)	7,369	3,798	3,566 m (11,699 ft)	9.983°S 76.689°W
San Francisco de Asís	Huarin	86.9 km^{2} (33.6 sq mi)	2,997	1,356	3,437 m (11,276 ft)	9.965°S 76.618°W
San Miguel de Cauri	Cauri	821 km^{2} (317 sq mi)	8,551	6,237	3,588 m (11,772 ft)	10.107°S 76.601°W
Total: Lauricocha	Jesús	1,860 km^{2} (720 sq mi)	31,988	19,956		

== Ethnic groups ==
The province is inhabited by indigenous citizens of Quechua descent. Spanish, however, is the language which the majority of the population (89.48%) learnt to speak in childhood, 10.36% of the residents started speaking using the Quechua language (2007 Peru Census).

== See also ==
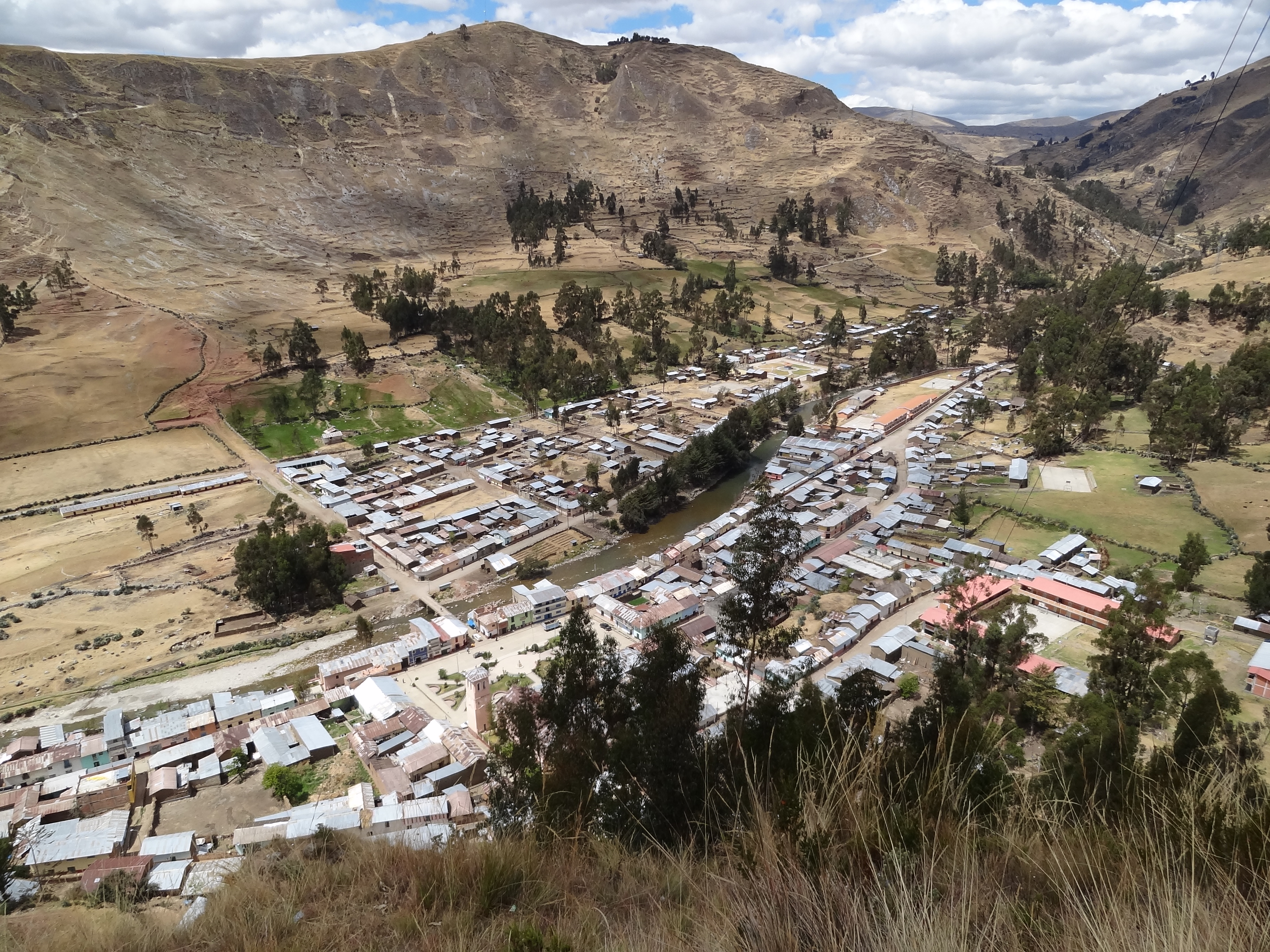
The town of Baňos on the Nupe River.

- Ch'uspiqucha
- Lauricocha Lake
- Lauricocha River
- Marañón River
- Mit'uqucha
- Ninaqucha
- Nupe River
- Pataqucha
- Puywanqucha
- Tampuqucha
- Tawlliqucha
- Tikra
- T'inkiqucha
- Qarwaqucha (Jesús-Queropalca)
- Qarwaqucha (San Miguel de Cauri)
- Waskhaqucha
