= Lauricocha =

Lauricocha (in hispanicized spelling) or Lawriqucha (Quechua for "bluish lake") may refer to:

== Lakes ==
- Lake Lauricocha, in Huánuco, Peru
- Lauricocha (Ancash), in the Ancash Region, Peru

== Rivers ==
- Lawriqucha River

== Places ==
- Lauricocha Province, a province in Peru
- Lauricocha (Huánuco), a village in Peru
- Lauricocha Culture, a sequence of cultural periods of Peru in the Huánuco area

== Others ==
- Margos-yarowilca-lauricocha - a language spoken by ca 80,000 Margos Chaulan Quechua in Peru
