= Kuntur Wachanan =

Mountain in Peru

- Location within Peru

Highest point
- Elevation: 4,800 m (15,700 ft)
- Coordinates: 10°19′31″S 76°46′53″W

Geography
- Location: Peru, Huánuco Region
- Parent range: Andes

Kuntur Wachanan (Quechua kuntur condor, wacha birth, to give birth, -na a suffix, 'where the condor is born', -n a suffix, also spelled Condorhuachanan) is a mountain in the Andes of Peru, about 4,800 m (15,700 ft) high. It lies between the Waywash mountain range in the west and the lake named Lawriqucha in the east. Kuntur Wachanan is situated in the Huánuco Region, Lauricocha Province, in the districts of Cauri and Jesús. The Waywash River (Huayhuash) flows along its northern slopes. It belongs to the Marañón watershed.

== See also ==
- Yana Hirka
