= Jesús, Peru =

Jesús
- Village
- Location within Peru
- Coordinates: 10°02′02″S 76°34′55″W
- Country: Peru
- Region: Huánuco
- Province: Lauricocha
- District: Jesús

Government
  - Mayor: Heriberto Hilarion Estrada Muñoz
- Elevation: 3,486 m (11,437 ft)
- Time zone: UTC-5 (PET)

Jesús is a town in central Peru, capital of the province of Lauricocha in the Huánuco region.

== Geography ==
Its coordinates are: 10°4'38.23 latitude south and 76º37'43.87 longitude west. It is located on the left side of the Lauricocha River (Nucon Valley, looking south to north), at an elevation of 3486 meters above mean sea level.

=== Transportation ===
You can reach the town by one of three ways:

- First, on the Panamerican Highway North: From Lima, La Unión, Huánuco, Wanuku Pampa, Rondos, Jivia and Jesús.
- Second, the central road: Lima, La Oroya, Huánuco, Wankapayaq, Yarumayu, Margos and Jesús.
- Third: Lima, Churin, Oyón, Raura, Cauri and Jesús.

== Tourism ==
Because of its location on the banks of the river Lauricocha (which gives rise to the Marañón River near the town of Rondos, to join the river Nupe), it is the starting point to visit the lagoon Lauricocha. Also, from the top of the hills that surround it, it is possible to observe on clear days the Cordillera Huayhuash in the southwest.
