= Yanajirca (Huánuco) =

Mountain in Peru

- Location within Peru

Highest point
- Elevation: 4,782 m (15,689 ft)
- Coordinates: 10°21′39″S 76°47′38″W

Geography
- Location: Peru, Huánuco Region
- Parent range: Andes, Raura

Yanajirca (possibly from Quechua yana black, hirka mountain) is a 4,782-metre-high (15,689 ft) mountain in the Andes of Peru. It lies in the north of the Raura mountain range and east of the Huayhuash range. The mountain is located in the Huánuco Region, Lauricocha Province, Jesús District. It is situated northwest of a lake named Patarcocha and southwest of Condorhuachanan. An intermittent stream named Luychos (Quechua for "deer", Luychu) originates on the southern slope of Yanajirca. It flows to the Huayhuash River which belongs to the watershed of the Marañón River.

== See also ==
- Chuspiccocha
- Lake Tinquicocha
