= Lake Carhuacocha (San Miguel de Cauri) =

Lake in Peru

- Location within Peru
- Location: Huánuco Region
- Coordinates: 10°25′13.3″S 76°41′31.8″W
- Basin countries: Peru

Lake Carhuacocha (possibly from Quechua qarwa leaf worm, larva of a beetle / pale / yellowish / golden, qucha lake) is a lake in Peru located in Huánuco Region, Lauricocha Province, San Miguel de Cauri District. It lies south of Lake Lauricocha, between Lake Tinquicocha in the west and Quiulacocha in the east, northeast of Raura mountain range.

== See also ==
- List of lakes in Peru
