= Jesús District, Lauricocha =

Coordinates: 10.0747°S 76.6286°W

Jesús District
- District
- Interactive map of Jesús District
- Country: Peru
- Region: Huánuco
- Province: Lauricocha
- Capital: Jesús

Government
  - Mayor: Heriberto Hilarion Estrada Muñoz

Area
  - Total: 449.9 km^{2} (173.7 sq mi)
- Elevation: 3,486 m (11,437 ft)

Population (2005 census)
  - Total: 5,919
  - Density: 13.16/km^{2} (34.07/sq mi)
- Time zone: UTC-5 (PET)
- UBIGEO: 101001

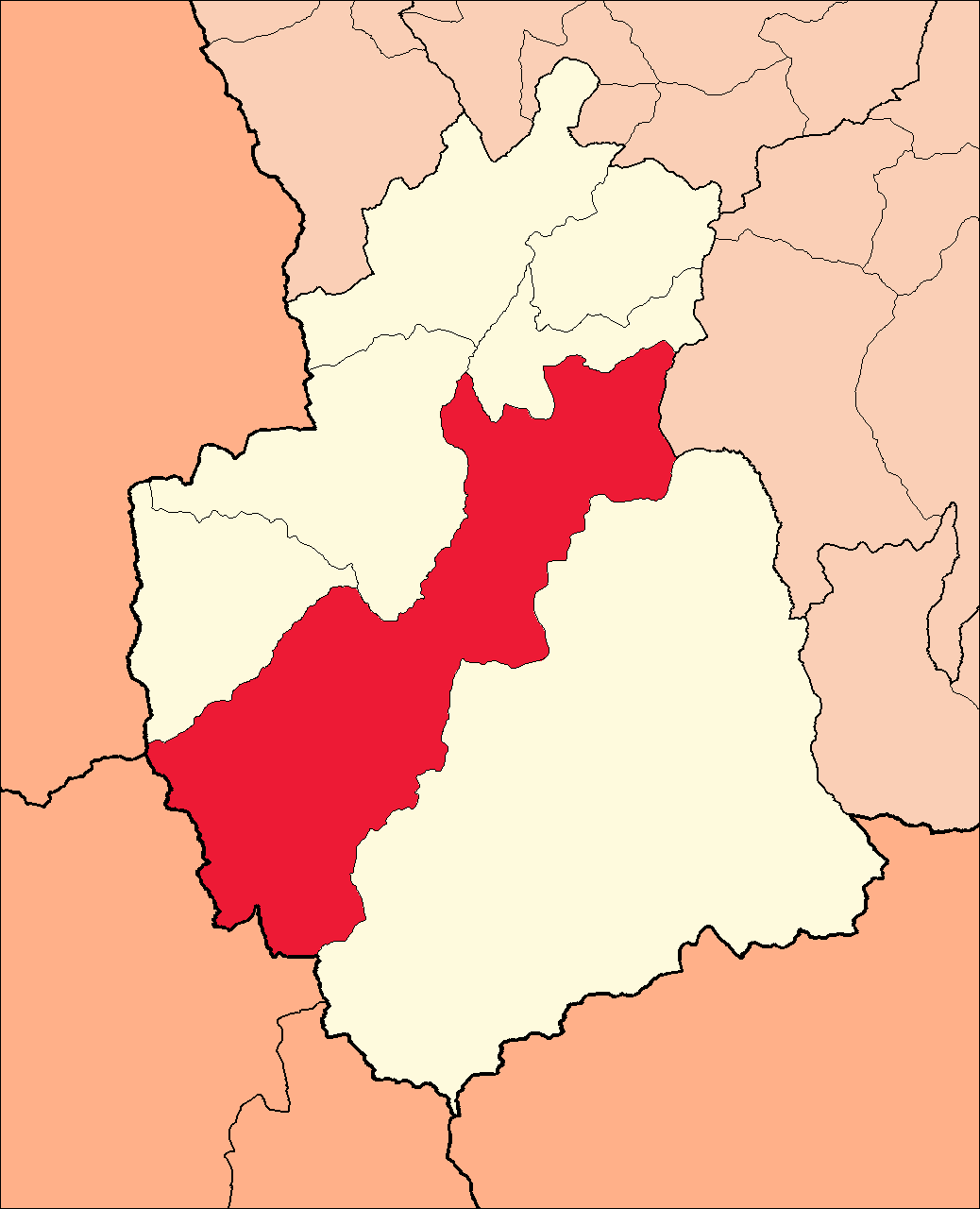
location of Jesús district within Lauricocha

Jesús District is one of seven districts of the province Lauricocha in Peru.

== Geography ==
The Waywash mountain range and the Rawra mountain range traverse the district. One of the highest peaks of the district is Siula. Other mountains are listed below:

- Kuntur Wachanan
- Kunkan
- Kuraw
- Pukaqucha
- Puskan T'urpu
- Wank'a Marka
- Yana Hirka
- Yarupaqa

== See also ==
- Lawriqucha River
- Qarwaqucha
- Tampuqucha
- Tikra
- Waskhaqucha
