= Lake Huascacocha (Huánuco) =

Lake in Peru

- Location within Peru
- Location: Peru; Huánuco Region
- Coordinates: 10°24′16″S 76°47′14″W

Lake Huascacocha (possibly from Quechua waskha or waska: rope; or wask'a: rectangle, long; and qucha: lake) or Lake Huacacocha is a lake in Peru located in Huánuco Region, Lauricocha Province, Jesús District. Lake Huascacocha lies in the north of the Raura mountain range, west of lakes Patarcocha and Chuspi.

== See also ==
- Yanajirca
