= San Miguel de Cauri District =

Coordinates: 10°08′19″S 76°37′22″W

San Miguel de Cauri Kawri
- District
- Interactive map of San Miguel de Cauri
- Country: Peru
- Region: Huánuco
- Province: Lauricocha
- Founded: December 26, 1940
- Capital: Cauri

Government
  - Mayor: Daniel Moises Davila Eunofre

Area
  - Total: 811.39 km^{2} (313.28 sq mi)
- Elevation: 3,588 m (11,772 ft)

Population (2005 census)
  - Total: 9,042
  - Density: 11.14/km^{2} (28.86/sq mi)
- Time zone: UTC-5 (PET)
- UBIGEO: 101007

San Miguel de Cauri District is one of seven districts of the Lauricocha Province in Peru.

== Geography ==
The Rawra mountain range traverses the district. Some of the highest mountains of the district are listed below:

- Ch'uspiqucha
- Kuntur Wachanan
- Parya Qayqu
- Puywanqucha
- Qayqu Anka

== See also ==
- Lawriqucha
- Lawriqucha River
- Patarqucha
- Qarwaqucha
- Tampuqucha
- Tawlliqucha
- T'inkiqucha
