= Tawlliqucha (Huánuco) =

Lake in the Huánuco Region of Peru

- Location within Peru
- Location: Peru; Huánuco Region
- Coordinates: 10°19′54″S 76°44′04″W

Tawlliqucha (Quechua tawlli, a kind of legume, qucha 'lake, lagoon', hispanicized spelling Taulicocha) is a lake in Peru located in the Huánuco Region, Lauricocha Province, Cauri District. It lies southeast of the larger lake named Lawriqucha, near the village of Tawlliqucha (Taulicocha).
