= Nupe =

Nupe or NUPE may refer to:

- Nupe people, of Nigeria
- Nupe language, their language
- Bida Emirate, also known as the Nupe Kingdom, their former state
- Nupe River, in the Huánuco Region, Peru
- National Union of Public Employees, a former trade union in the United Kingdom
- A member of the Kappa Alpha Psi fraternity in the United States
