= Rondos District =

Coordinates: 9°58′50″S 76°41′10″W

Rondos
- District
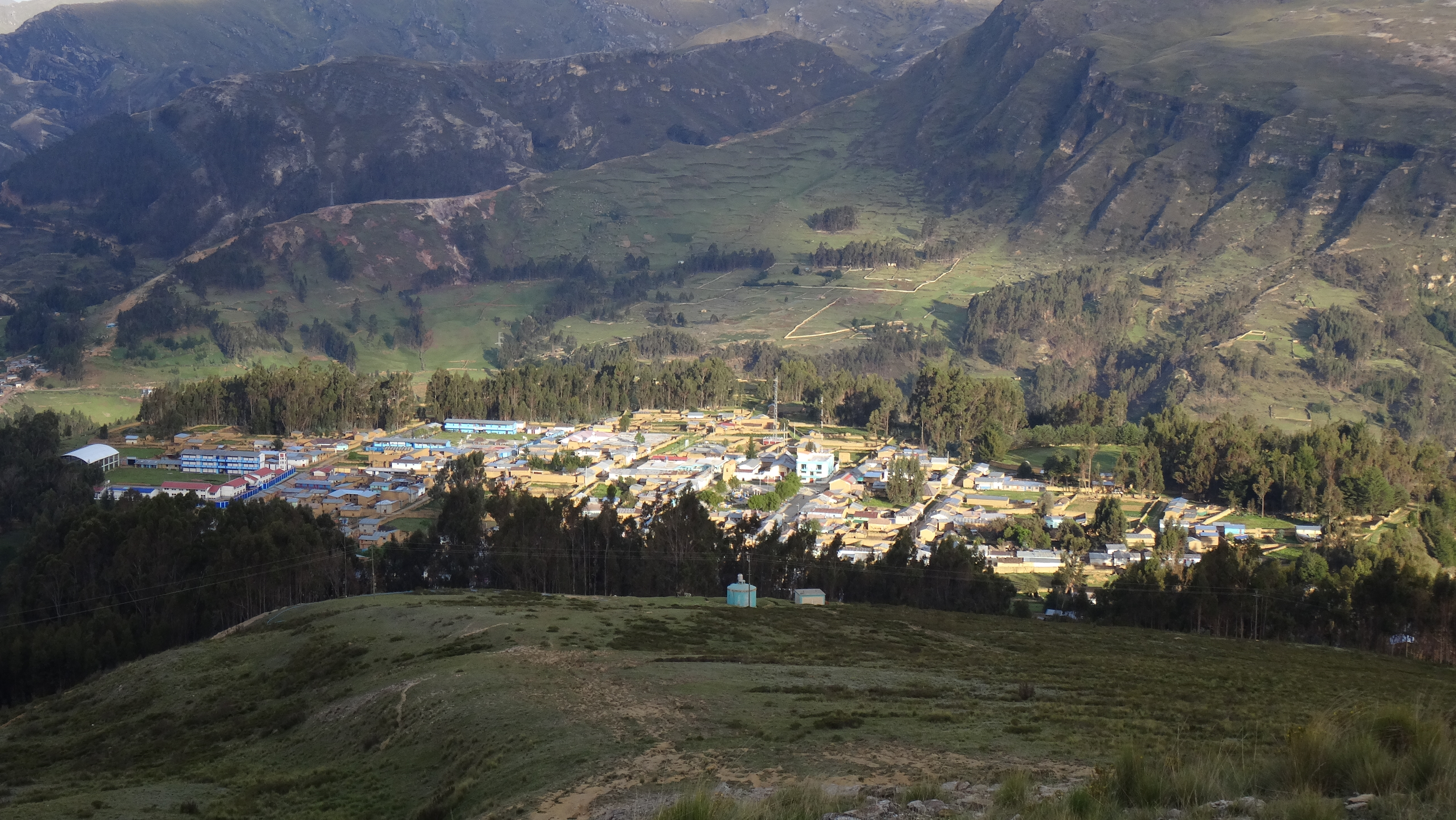
- The town of Rondos
- Interactive map of Rondos
- Country: Peru
- Region: Huánuco
- Province: Lauricocha
- Founded: December 27, 1932
- Capital: Rondos

Area
  - Total: 172.7 km^{2} (66.7 sq mi)
- Elevation: 3,566 m (11,699 ft)

Population (Peru 2017 Census)
  - Total: 3,798
  - Density: 21.99/km^{2} (56.96/sq mi)
- Time zone: UTC-5 (PET)
- UBIGEO: 101005

Rondos District is one of seven districts of the province Lauricocha in the Huanuco Region of Peru. The district had an area of 172.7 square kilometres (66.7 sq mi) and a population of 3,798 in 2017. The town of Rondos is the capital of the district and had a population of 826 in 2017. The town is situated on a mesa overlooking the junction of the Lauricocha and Nupe Rivers, 250 metres (820 ft) in elevation below Rondos, to form the Marañon River. The headwaters of both the Lauricocha and Nupe rivers have been proposed as sources of the Amazon River.

== Climate ==
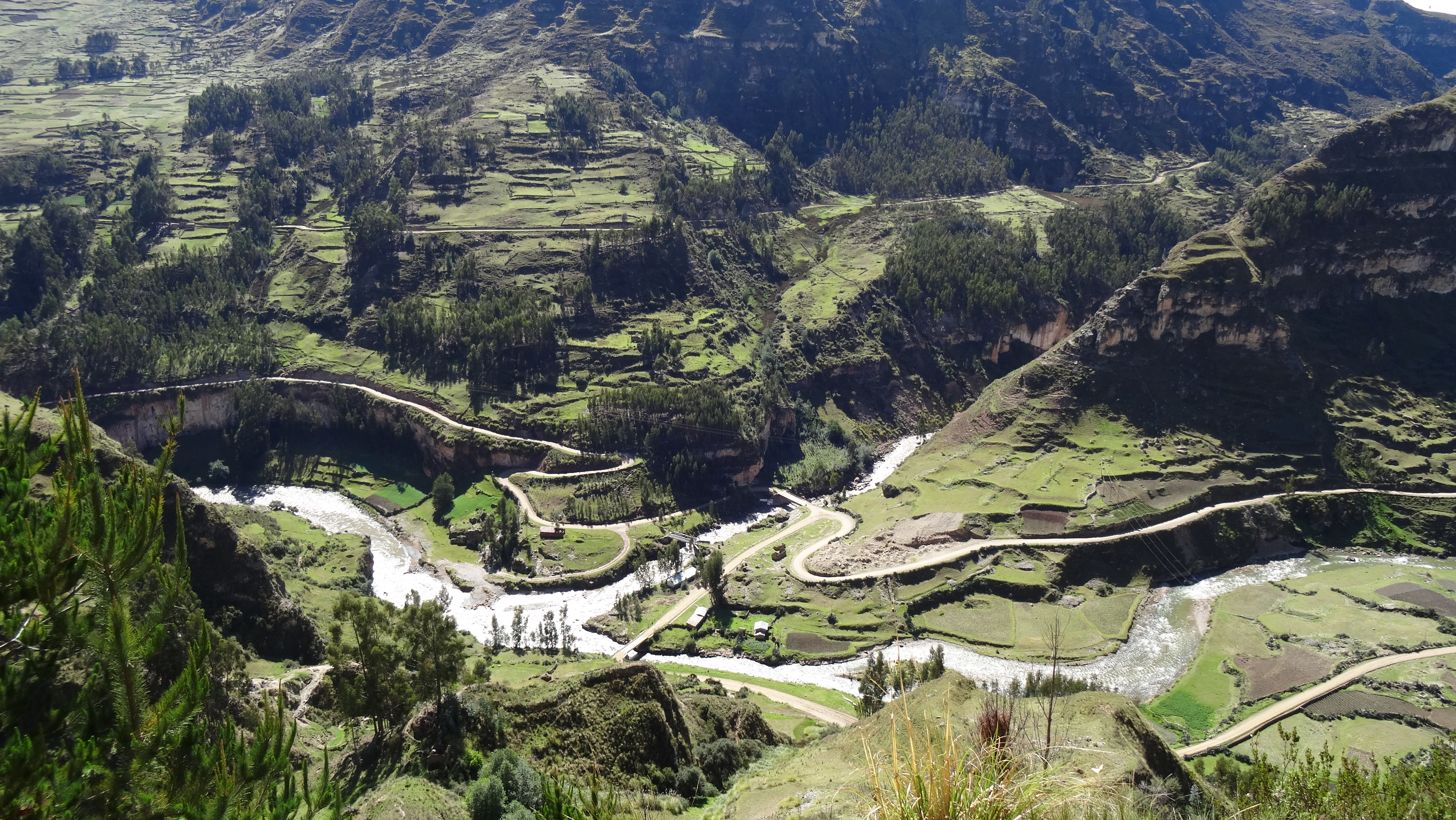
A view from the town of Rondos of the confluence of the Nupe and Lauricocha rivers forming the Marañon River.

The location within the tropics and the high elevation of Rondos impacts the climate which is typically cool and cloudy. Daily temperatures vary little during the course of a year and usually fall within a range of 2 °C (36 °F) to 17 °C (63 °F) degrees. Rarely does the temperature rise to above 19 °C (66 °F) or fall to below −1 °C (30 °F). The nearest weather station at San Miguel de Cauri, 30 km (19 miles) distant from Rondos, gets 872 mm (34.3 in) of precipitation annually. Most is between October and April with a distinct dry season from May to September.
