= Wank'a Marka =

Mountain in Peru

- Location within Peru

Highest point
- Elevation: 4,800 m (15,700 ft)
- Coordinates: 10°20′52″S 76°50′15″W

Geography
- Location: Peru, Huánuco Region
- Parent range: Andes

Wank'a Marka (Quechua wank'a rock, marka village, "black mountain", Hispanicized spelling Huancamarca) is a mountain in the Andes of Peru, about 4,800 m (15,700 ft) high. It is located in the Huánuco Region, Lauricocha Province, Jesús District. Wank'a Marka lies between the Waywash range and the Rawra mountain range, northwest of Asul Hanka and northeast of Puskan T'urpu.
