= Tikra =

Archaeological site in Peru

- Location within Peru
- 10°03′05″S 76°37′10″W
- Location: Peru, Huánuco Region

Tikra (Quechua tikray to turn upside down, Hispanicized spelling Ticra) is an archaeological site in Peru. It was declared a National Cultural Heritage by Resolución Directoral No. 952/INC on September 20, 2001. The site consists of circular buildings and square or rectangular burial towers (chullpa). Tikra is situated in the Huánuco Region, Lauricocha Province, Jesús District, near Tikra (San José de Ticra, San José de Ticras). It lies on the slopes of Pitaq Mach'ay (Pitac Machay, Pitacmachay) northeast of Jesús.
