= Source of the Amazon River =

Map of the Amazon River

The source of the Amazon River, the largest river in the world by discharge, has been a subject of exploring and speculations for centuries and continues to cause arguments even today. Determining the origin of the Amazon River has evoked broad debates among scholars, explorers, and travelers all over the world. Different definitions of a river's source have been used and continue to be used. Generally, four main criteria can be applied to determine the main source of a river: source flow rate, source length, watershed area of the source, and an altitude of its spring. At present, the Amazon River is not considered to have one unique source but a number of headstream areas. These are headwaters of three different Peruvian rivers that can be found in the high Andes: the Marañón, the Apurímac, and the Mantaro.

== Background ==
The Amazon River is the largest river in the world in terms of its flow rate. In addition, it is the second-longest river, measuring 6,575 km (4,086 mi) from its source to the mouth of the Atlantic Ocean after the Nile River which is considered to be the longest river in the world, although there is some dispute. About halfway through its length, upstream from the city of Iquitos, Peru, the Amazon divides into the Marañón and Ucayali, with the Ucayali in turn dividing into the Apurímac and the Mantaro rivers further upstream. The Marañón, Mantaro and Apurímac rivers all originate in the Peruvian Andes at altitudes over 5,000 metres (16,000 ft), and the headwaters of all three have been claimed to be the source of the Amazon. The Marañón has the greater discharge, but the Ucayali and its tributaries run for 2,738 kilometres (1,701 mi) compared to the 1,415 kilometres (879 mi) of the Marañón, which makes the Apurímac and the Mantaro the two most distant parts of the Amazon's headwaters.

== The Marañón River headwaters ==
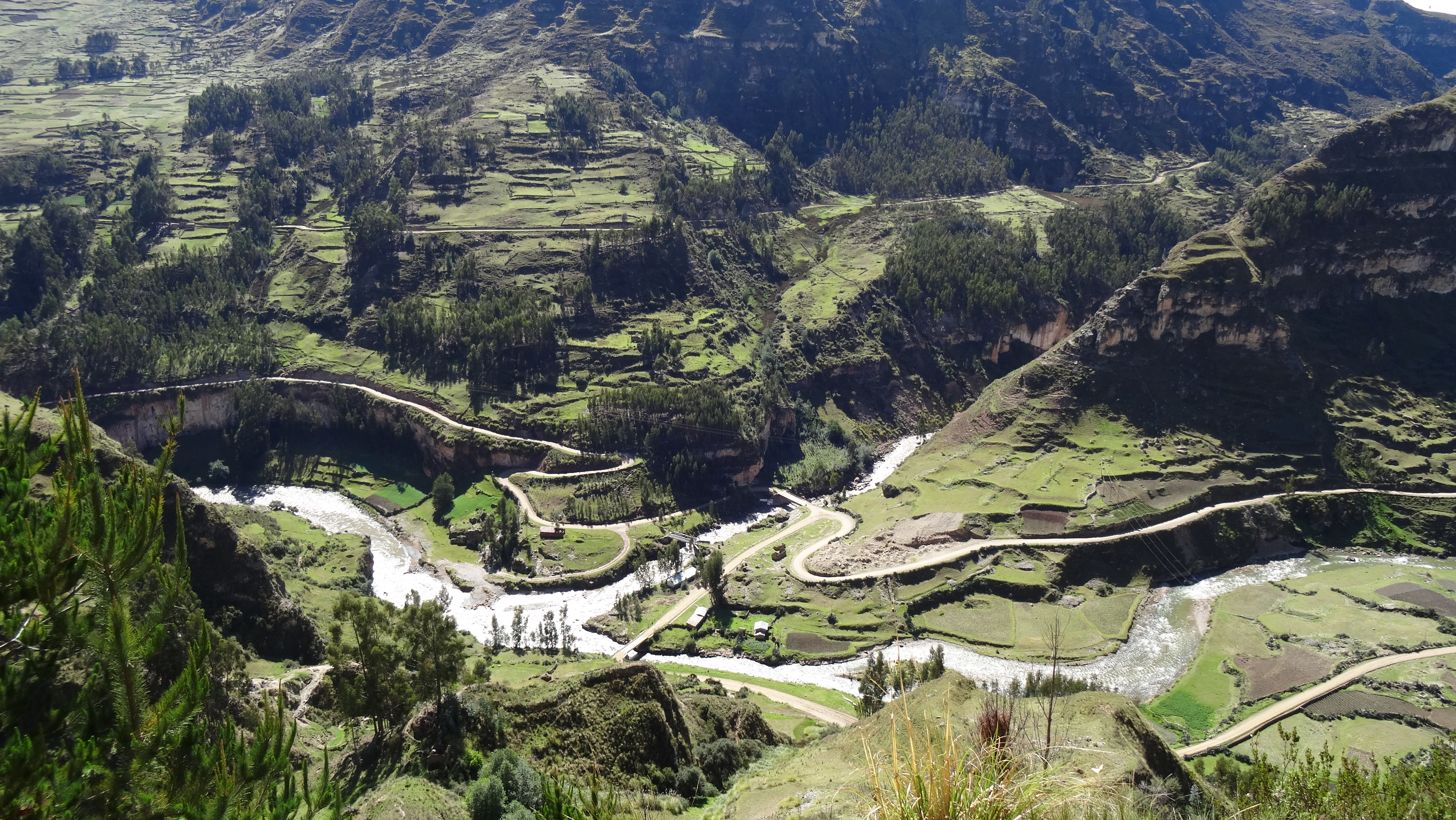
The Marañón River is formed by the union of the Nupe River (right) and the Lauricocha River (center) at an elevation of 10,882 feet (3,317 m).

The source of the Marañón River had been considered the main source of the Amazon River for a number of centuries. This source was determined by a Czech Jesuit priest named Father Samuel Fritz who sailed the Amazon River from its mouth upstream and drew the first map of the Amazon River basin. His map from 1707 shows the Marañón River as larger than the Ucayali River, and thus the main source of the Amazon River. Fritz believed that the Marañón contributed the most water of all the Amazon's tributaries, making it the most important headstream. He pinpointed the source of the Marañón River as Lake Lauricocha in the high Western Andes. This lake (10.313°S 76.696°W) is located at an altitude of 3,856 metres (12,651 ft). The Lauricocha River issuing from Lake Lauricocha joins the Nupe River 22 kilometres (14 miles) north of the lake near the town of Rondos and the union of the two small rivers forms what is afterwards known as the Marañón River.

Fritz's claim about the main source of the Amazon River was unchallenged for nearly 200 years. In the late 19th century, an Italian-born Peruvian geographer and scientist Antonio Raimondi proposed that the Nupe River, which he said was a longer and more voluminous river than the Lauricocha River, is the main head stream. The Nupe River has its origin in a system of small lakes near one of the highest peaks of the Huayhuash Range called Siula Grande. The uppermost lake 4,351 metres (14,275 ft) is called Quesillococha (10.282°S 76.869°W).

Half a century later, in 1952, two Englishmen, Sebastian Snow and John Brown, identified a small glacial lake called Niñococha, as the source of the Amazon River. The stream from this lake, located in the Raura mountain range, flows down through the Raura silver mine to Lake Lauricocha. Afterwards, Snow went down the Amazon River all the way to its mouth in the Atlantic Ocean. Lake Niñococha (10.458°S 76.764°W) is located at an altitude of 4,964 metres (16,286 ft).

== The Apurímac River headwaters ==
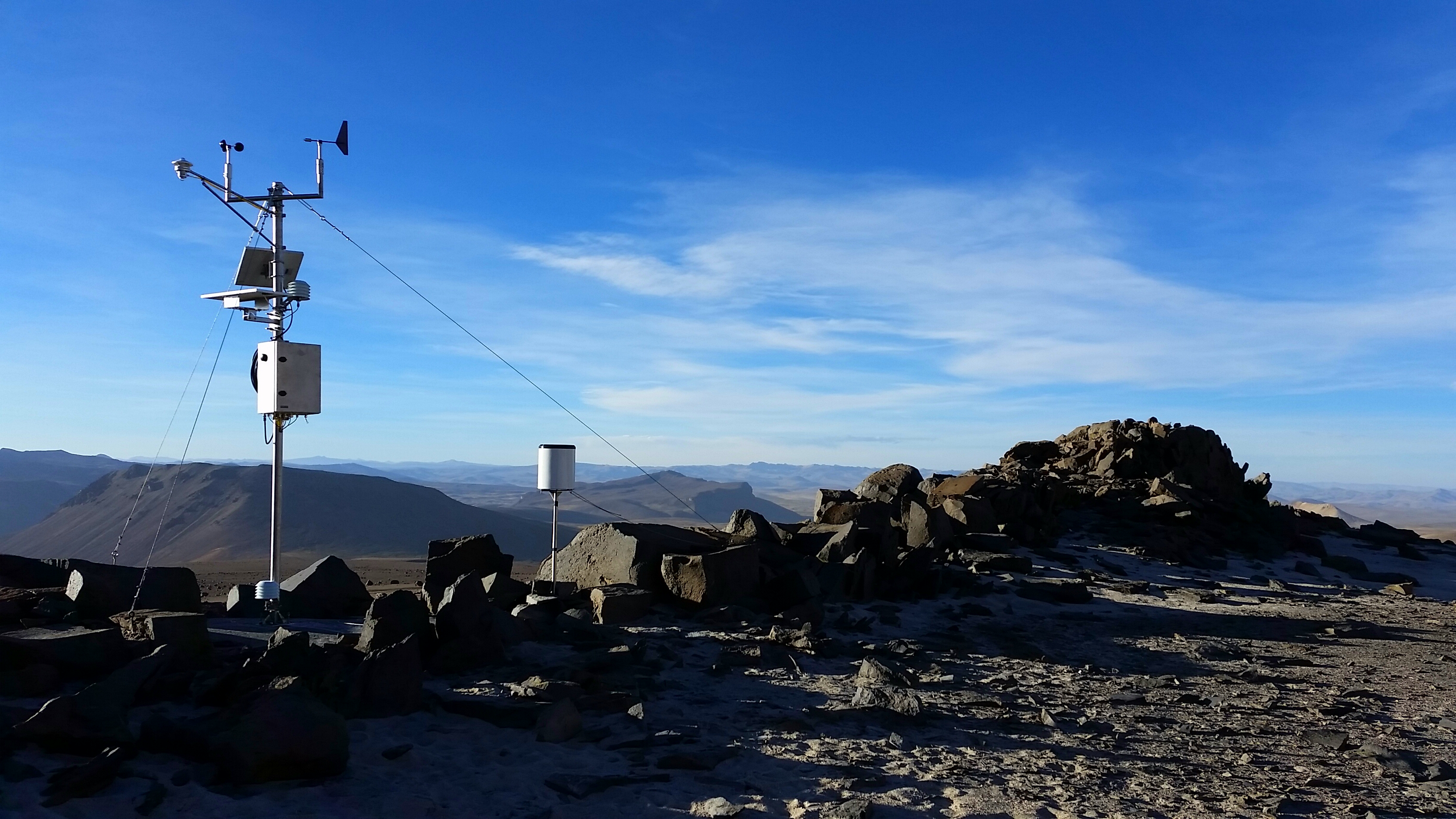
Climate station in the Amazon River headwaters near Nevado Mismi at the altitude of 5.280 m a.s.l.

In the 1930s attention turned to the headwaters of the Apurímac River. In 1935, Lake Vilafro (15.203°S 71.880°W), located at an altitude of 4,674 metres (15,335 ft) was identified as the main source of the Amazon River. In 1969, Carlos Peñaherrera del Aguila, a prominent Peruvian geographer, was the first to label the Carhuasanta River (and the Lloqueta River) flowing down the Mismi Mountain in southern Peru as a possible ultimate source. Two years later the eleven million dollar "Cousteau Amazon Expedition" examined the question, culminating in a six-hour television documentary entitled "Cousteau's Amazon", which was released in 1983. This expedition was broken into three separate groups and the upper Amazon section was covered by "The Flying Expedition" tasked with exploring the upper third from the river's origin on Mt. Mismi. The expedition utilised newly developed satellite imagery, measured by an American cartographic organization to determine the furthest point of flowing water to its meeting the Atlantic Ocean. The Upper Amazon expedition included an Eastern European multi-axled articulated Land Rover, a float plane Papagaiu, for aerial reconnaissance, and the Peruvian Air Force offered a high elevation helicopter to examine the upper levels of the Chila mountain range and Mt. Mismi.

Cousteau dispatched a team of German alpinists to summit the 18,000 feet (5,486 m) volcano and during their descent they found melt water dropping into a fissure. This deep cleft in the southern slope of Mismi varied in size from two meters to half a meter wide, angling down the slope. The stream within flowed nearly fifty meters before disappearing, becoming ground water, then emerging lower downstream to continue its course. Within this fissure, the water was deep enough to float a small craft presenting the expedition with an opportunity to navigate the highest and furthest origin of the Amazon. Cousteau brought American, Olympic trained kayaker Caril Ridley to the mountain, who with expedition support ascended the mountain from a small pampas lake, using a Llama train bearing ropes, kayak and equipment, and in June, 1982 became the first person to run the origins of the Amazon.

Later expeditions have refined our understanding of the river's many tributaries and meandering flow with its many-disputed origins. The definition of a "rivers origin" remains subject of debate by communities, organizations, expeditions and adventurers seeking to claim the prize. But this small lake at the northern foot of Mismi with its high elevation crevasse remains the most likely candidate.

A National Geographic Society expedition led by Loren McIntyre identified a small lake 15.516°S 71.692°W, 5,319 metres (17,451 ft) on the northern slope of the Mismi Mountain as the main source. This lake, named Lake McIntyre, later incorrectly appeared on some maps as "Laguna Bohemia". The real Laguna Bohemia 15.512°S 71.702°W, 5,148 metres (16,890 ft) was later identified by a Czech-Peruvian expedition led by Bohumír Janský as one of the main sources of the Amazon.

Other expeditions were led to this area. In 1996, Polish-born Jacek Palkiewicz and Peruvian Zaniel I. Novoa Goicochea refuted Lake McIntyre and identified a small spring beneath a cliff in the catchment of the Apacheta River near Nevado Choquecorao 15.521°S 71.761°W, 5,182 metres (17,001 ft) as the main source. Their argument was that the Apacheta is larger and longer than the Carhuasanta. However, this argument was later refuted. After the confluence of the Carhuasanta and Apacheta Rivers, the Lloqueta River originates.

In 1999–2000, a Czech scientific team led by Bohumír Janský from the Charles University in Prague, linked to the opinion of Carlos Peñaherrera del Aguila, cooperated with him and named the Carhuasanta River the main source of the Amazon. In 2011 Janský and his team published the results of a years-long project documenting their claim. They described four streams (Carhuasanta, Apacheta, Sillanque and Ccaccansa) forming the Lloqueta River in great detail. Based on these outcomes, the Carhuasanta River is the longest and has the largest drainage area. They identified two sources of the Carhuasanta River, Laguna Bohemia (or Lake Bohemia) and so-called Rocky Spring. In order to monitor the hydrological conditions and have further evidence to support the claim, Janský's team has since installed a number of hydrological and climatic stations in this area. Present research confirms their claim of the Carhuasanta River as the main source of the Amazon in the sense of the highest uninterrupted flow rate. By 2007, all glaciers in the area of Lloqueta River headwaters disappeared as a consequence of ongoing climate change. This fact resulted in a change of local hydrological conditions but the two identified sources remain uninterrupted.

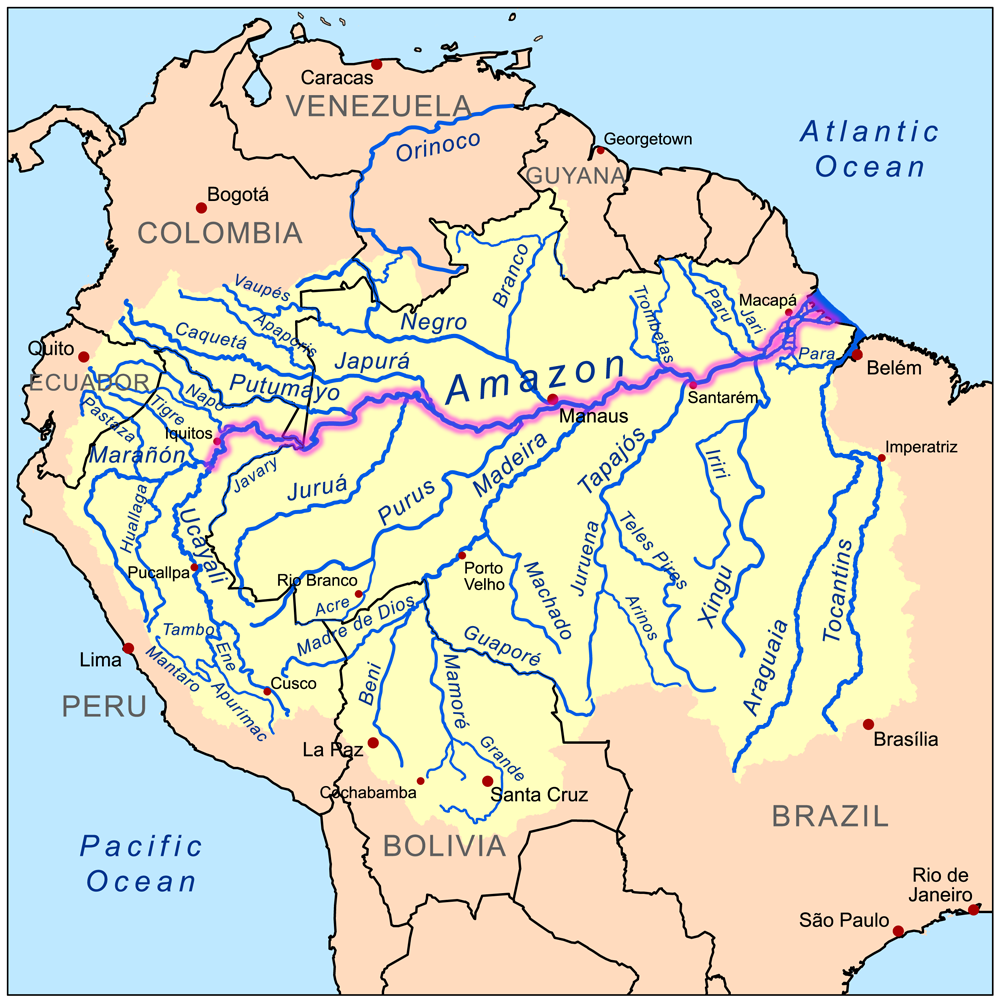
Map of the Amazon River drainage basin with the Amazon River highlighted

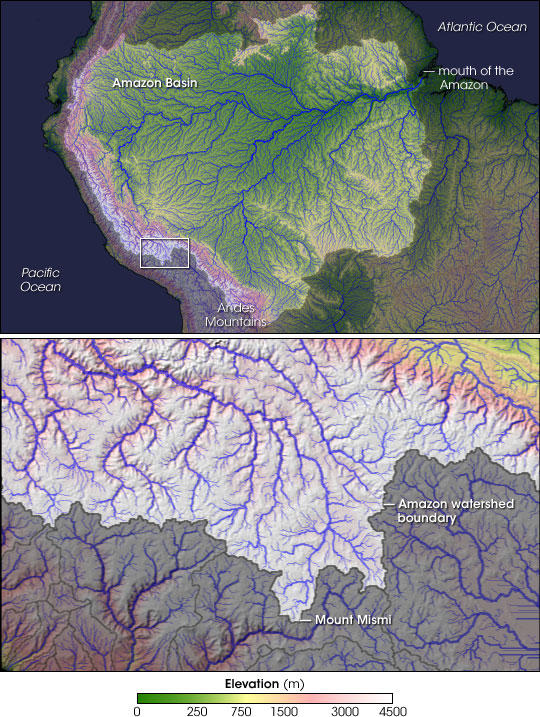
The Apurímac source of the Amazon.

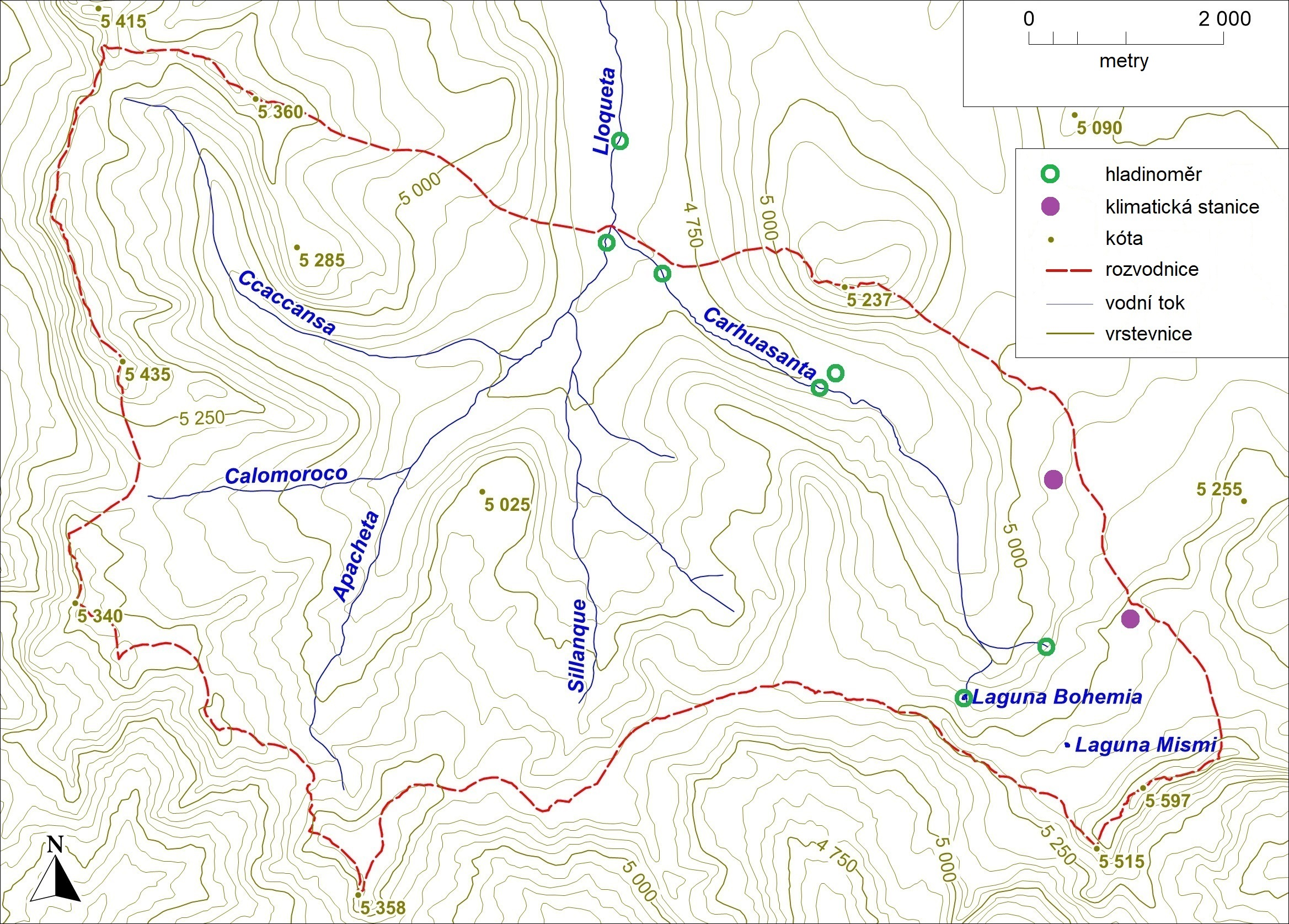
Amazon River headwaters map

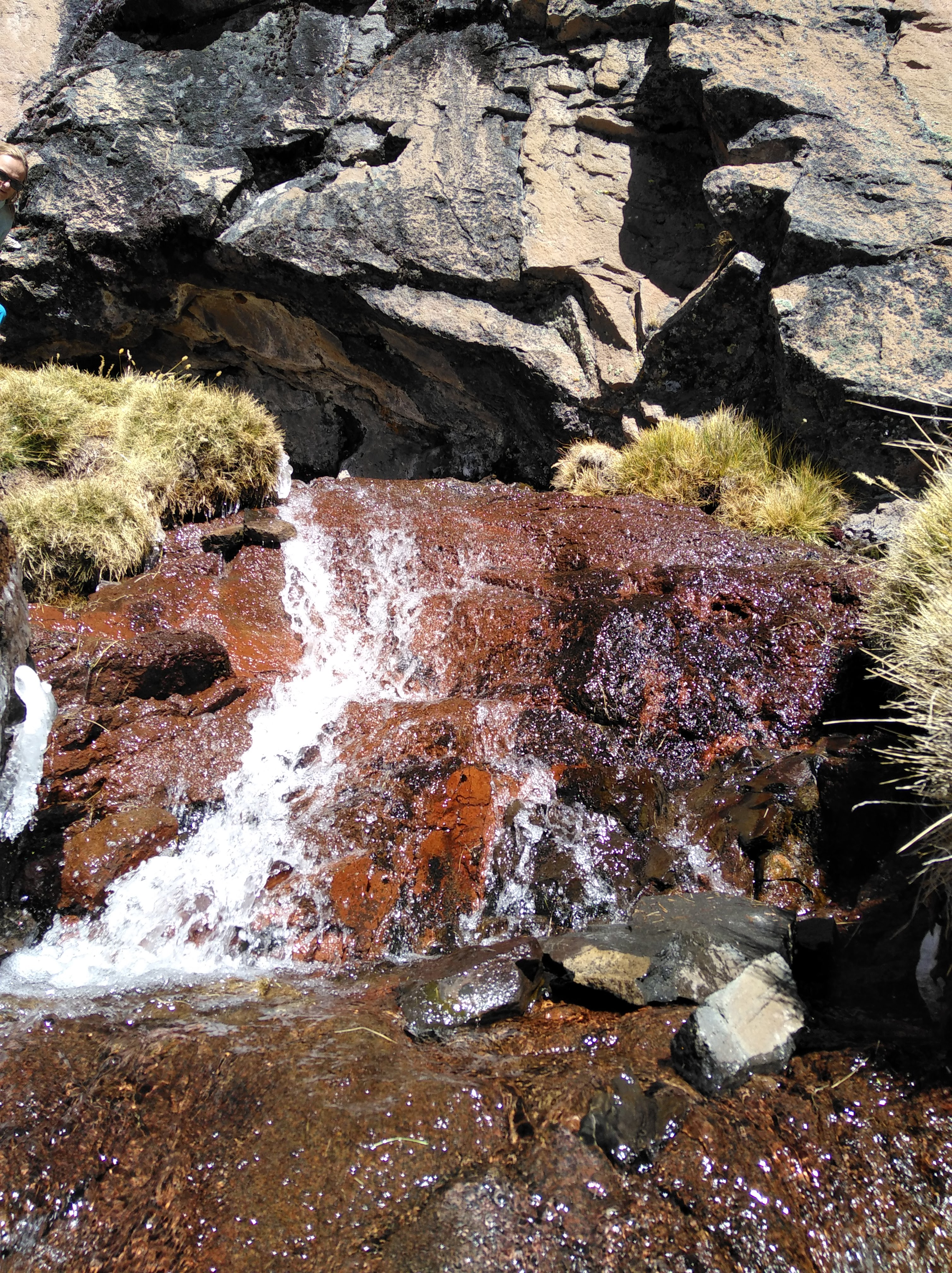
Carhuasanta Rocky Spring

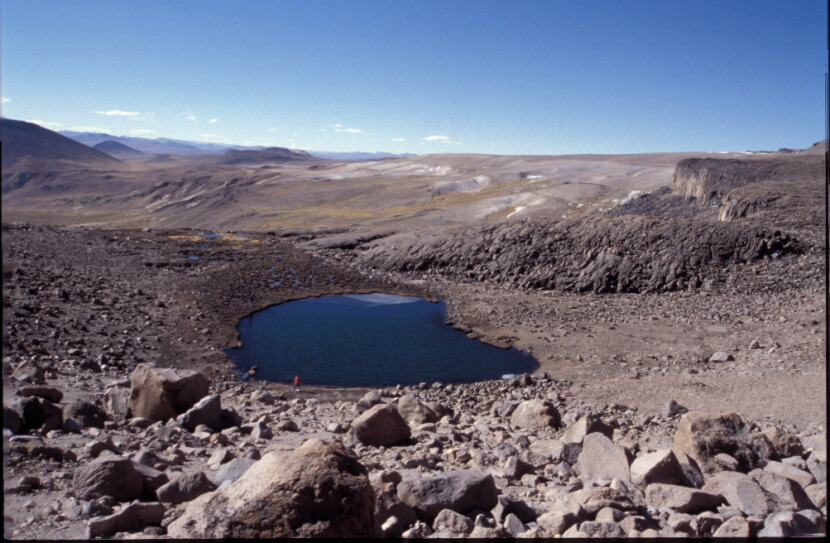
Carhuasanta Laguna Bohemia

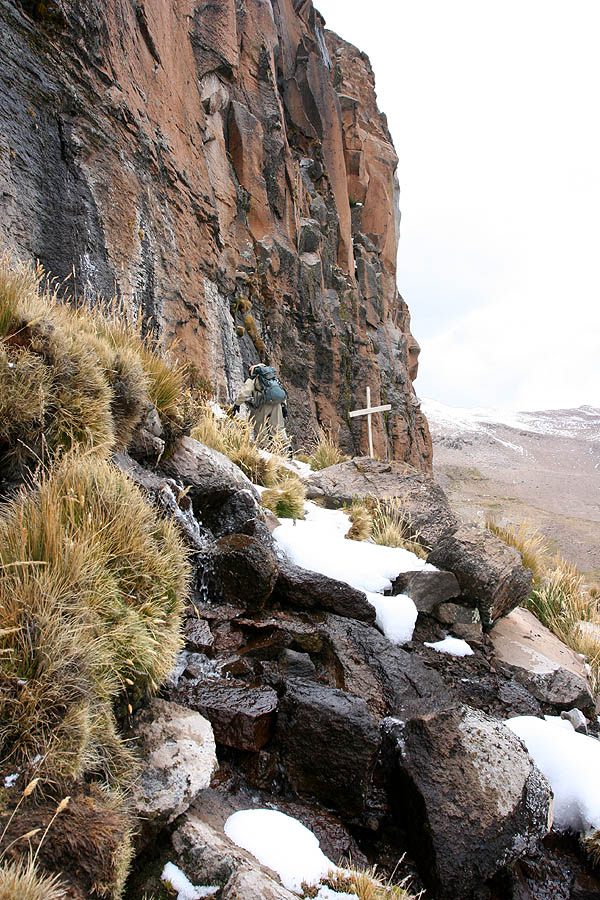
The cross marks a spring, the headwater of the Apacheta River, one of the two sources of the Amazon on the Apurímac River.

== The Mantaro River headwaters ==
In 2014, James Contos and Nicholas Tripcevich came up with a finding that the most distant source of the Amazon is called the Mantaro River. They located the most distant spring in the headwaters of Lake Junin in the Rumi Cruz mountains 10.732°S 76.648°W, at an elevation of 5,220 metres (17,130 ft). Contos and Tripcevich calculated and compared the length of the Apurímac 734.3 kilometres (456.3 mi) and Mantaro Rivers 809 kilometres (503 mi) and found that the Mantaro River is about 75 kilometres (47 mi) longer. Nevertheless, Contos and Tripcevich acknowledge that the flow of the Mantaro River source is interrupted several months a year and thus a drop of water at its source may not complete the journey to the mouth of the Amazon.

== Headstream areas of the Amazon River ==
Traditionally, many geographers and explorers have defined a source as the most distant point upstream that provides the largest volume of water to a river. However, this criterion is not easy to employ in the case of most of the world's largest rivers. Depending on which definition or interpretation is preferred, there can certainly be a couple of different answers for the source of a given river. Thus, a number of headstream areas of the Amazon River should be considered:

1. the Marañon River (the Lauricocha and Nupe Rivers) in a historical context;
2. the Mantaro River with the most distant but semi-permanent spring;
3. the Apurímac River (the Carhuasanta River) with the most distant source of uninterrupted flow.

History of claims and hypotheses concerning the Amazon River headwaters
Author	Year	Source
S.J. Santos García	1935	Laguna Vilafro
Michel Perrin	1953	Cerro Huagra
Gerardo Diánderas	1953	Cerro Huagra - Río Monigote
Helen a Frank Schreider	1968	Laguna Vilafro
Nicholas Asheshov	1969	Nevado Minaspata
Carlos Peñaherrera del Águila	1969	Nevado Mismi – Carhuasanta River
Loren McIntyre	1971	Nevado Choquecorao
Walter Bonatti	1978	Río Huarajo
Jean Michel Cousteau	1982	Nevado Choquecorao
Jacek Palkiewicz, Zaniel I. Novoa Goicochea	1997	Nevado Quehuisha - Apacheta River
Bohumír Janský (Expedition Hatun Mayu 1999)	1999	Nevado Mismi - Carhuasanta River
Andrew Pietowski, Andrew Johnston (Amazon Sources 2000 Expedition National Geographic)	2000	Rio Lloqueta tributaries: Carhuasanta, Sillanque, Apacheta, Calomarco, Ccaccansa
Bohumír Janský (Czech-Peruvian expedition Hatun Mayu 2000)	2000	Nevado Mismi - headwaters territory with sources of Carhuasanta, Ccaccansa, Apacheta and Sillanque
