= Lake Patarcocha =

Lake in Peru

- Location within Peru
- Location: Huánuco Region
- Coordinates: 10°23′23″S 76°45′36″W
- Basin countries: Peru
- Max. length: 2.75 km (1.71 mi)
- Max. width: 1 km (0.62 mi)
- Surface elevation: 4,130 m (13,550 ft)

Lake Patarcocha is a lake in Peru located in the Huánuco Region, Lauricocha Province, Cauri District at a height of about 4,130 m. It lies in the north-east of Raura mountain range, north-west of lakes Tinquicocha and Chuspi. Lake Patarcocha is 2.75 km long and 1 km at its widest point.

== See also ==
- Puyhuanccocha
- Lake Huascacocha
- List of lakes in Peru
