= Lake Tambococha =

Lake in Peru

- Location within Peru
- Location: Huanuco Region
- Coordinates: 10°9′24″S 76°39′56″W
- Basin countries: Peru
- Surface elevation: 3,800 metres (12,467 ft)

Lake Tambococha (possibly from Quechua tampu inn, qucha lake) is a lake in Peru located in the Huanuco Region, Lauricocha Province, at the border of the districts Cauri and Jesús. It lies at a height of about 3,800 metres (12,467 ft), between mountain Pinculloc in the northwest and Canchamachay in the southeast.

Tampuqucha is situated near an Inca road and near the archaeological site of Tunsukancha (or Tunsunkancha).

== See also ==
- List of lakes in Peru
