= Nupe River =

River in Peru

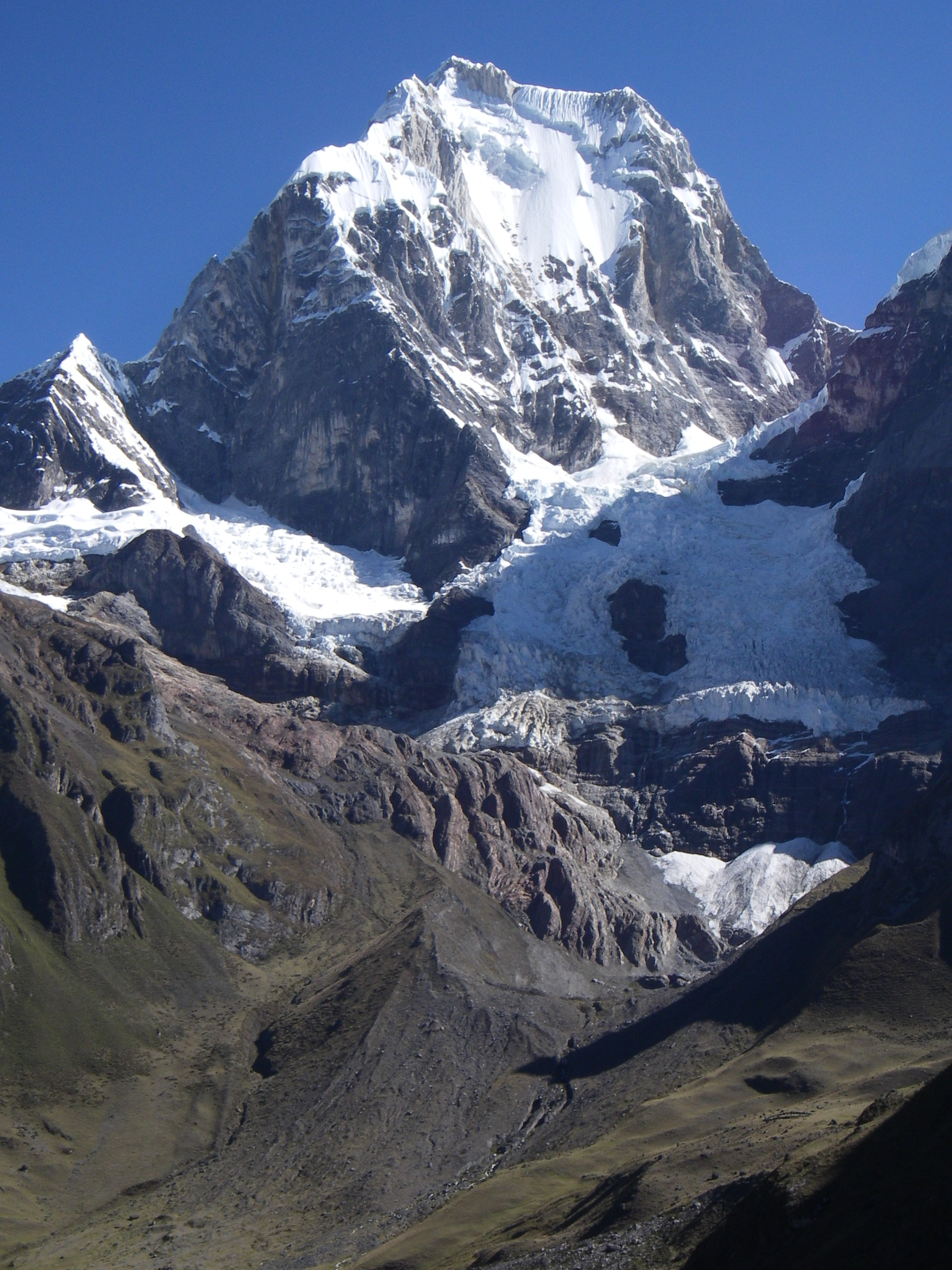
The glaciers of Yerupaja are one of the sources of the Nupe River.

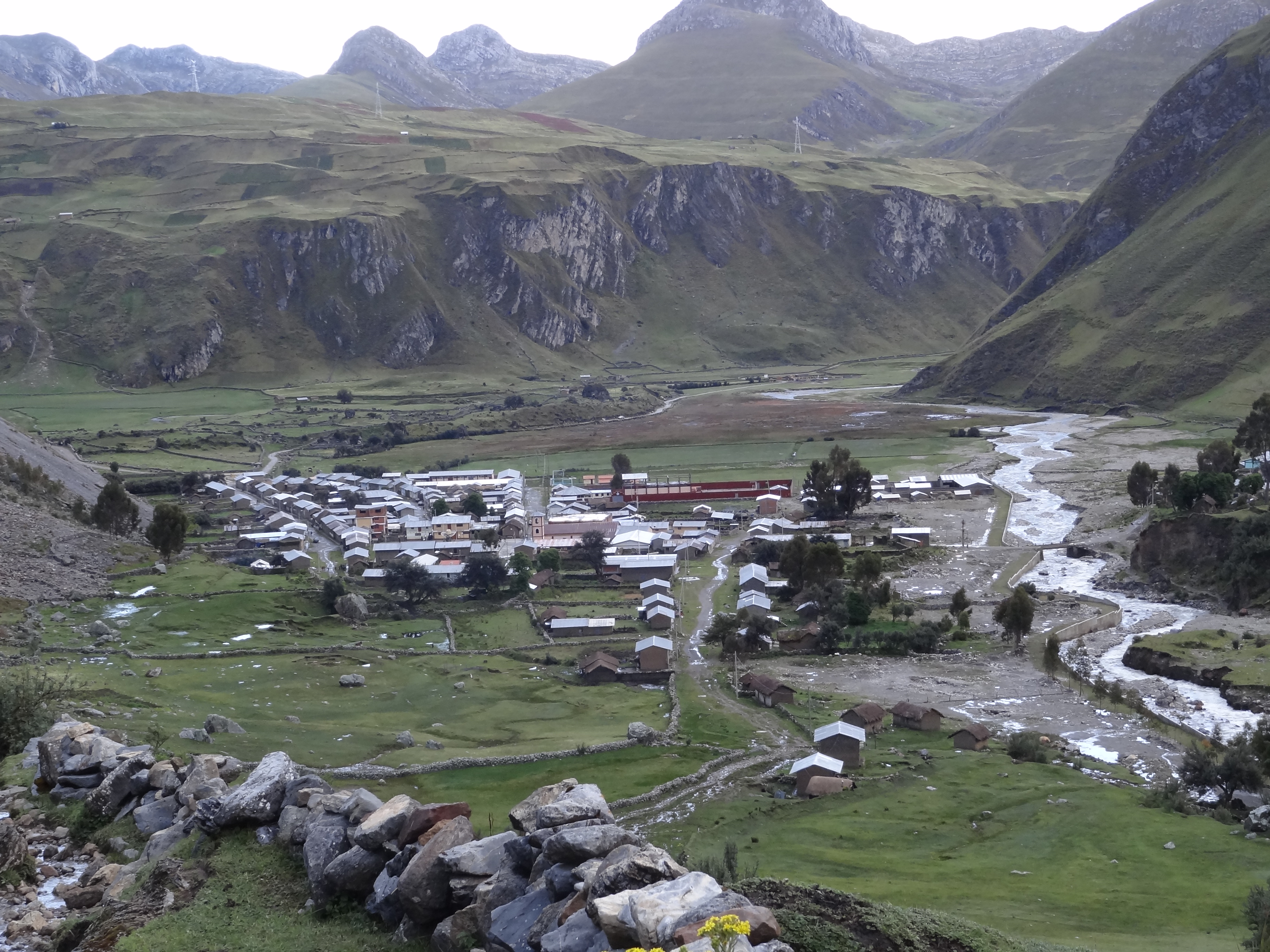
The Nupe River flows by Queropalca, elevation 3,829 metres (12,562 ft).

The Nupe is a small river in the Huánuco Region in Peru. It rises in the Cordillera Huayhuash and joins the Lauricocha River forming what is then called the Marañón River, one of the two largest upstream contributors to the Amazon River. The headwaters of the Nupe have been proposed as one of the sources of the Amazon.

The source of the Nupe River is Quesillococha lake (10.282°S 76.869°W) at an elevation of 4,351 metres (14,275 ft). The lake is at the foot of the Saropo Este glacier on the lower slopes of Siula Grande mountain, elevation 6,344 metres (20,814 ft), one of the highest peaks in the Cordillera Huayhuash of the Andes. Upstream tributaries of the Nupe also flow from the glaciers below Yerupajá, 6,635 metres (21,768 ft) elevation, the second-highest mountain in Peru. The Nupe has a length of 85 kilometres (53 miles) before joining the Lauricocha River near the village of Rondos. The elevation at the junction of the rivers is 3,318 metres (10,886 ft).

The headwaters of the Marañon, especially Lauricocha Lake and river, were long considered the source of the Amazon. However, in the late 19th century, an Italian-born Peruvian geographer and scientist Antonio Raimondi proposed that the Nupe River, longer and more voluminous than the Lauricocha River, was the main head stream. Other sources at the headwaters of the Apurimac and Mantaro rivers have since been proposed as the source of the Amazon.

Several villages are located along the course of the Nupe River, the largest being Queropalca with a population of 779 in 2017 and Baños with a population of 975 in 2017. Rondos, near the junction of the Nupe and Lauricocha, had a population of 709 in 2017. The major north-south Inca road, the Qhapaq Ňan, which ran from Cuzco to Quito, Ecuador, crossed the Nupe River on a bridge, no longer in existence, north of the town of Baños. The remnants of the road and a hot spring, enclosed by a rock wall built during the Inca period, are near the crossing.

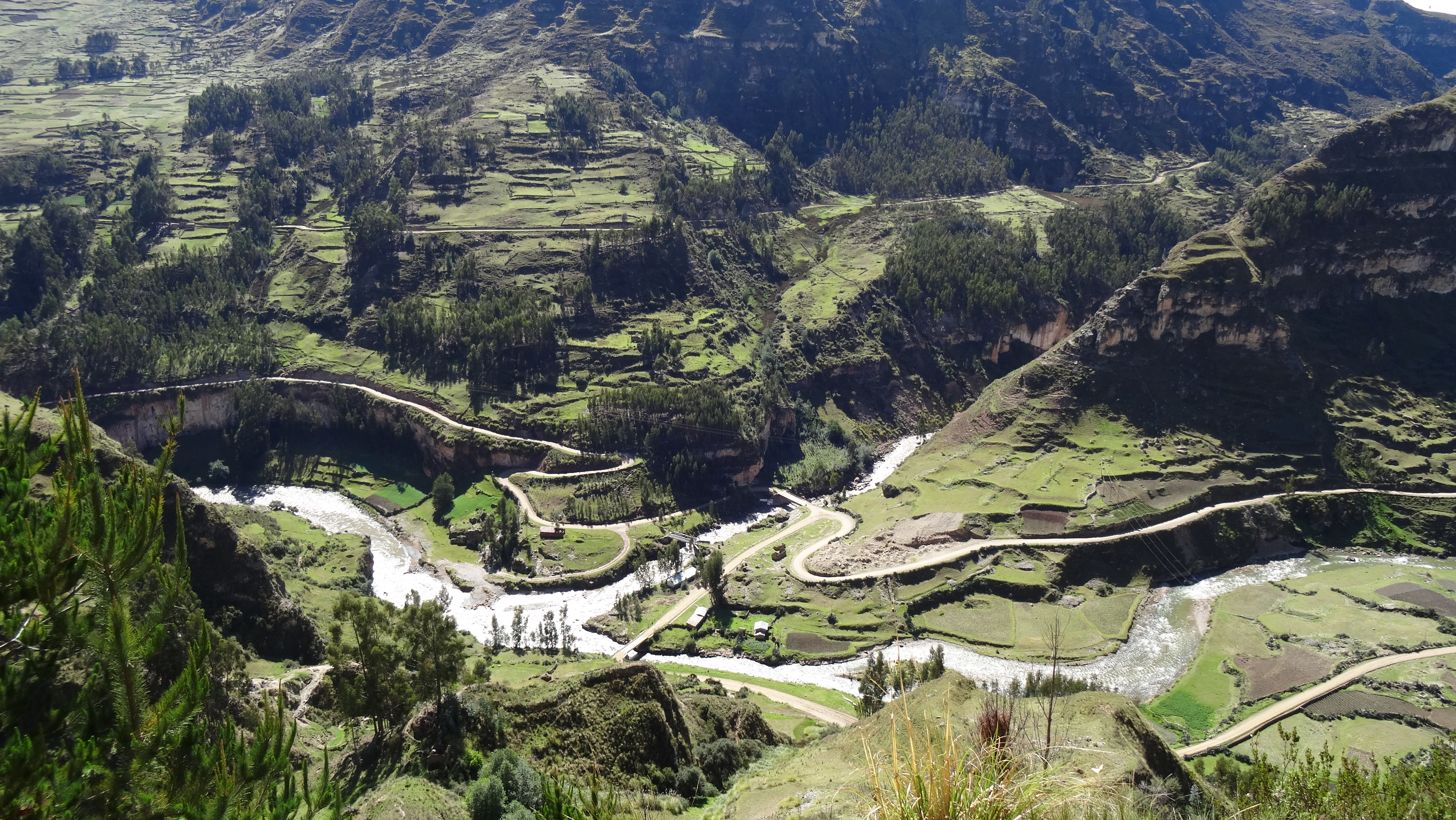
The Nupe (bottom right) joins the Lauricocha River (center) to form the Marañón.
