= Chuspiccocha (Huánuco) =

Mountain in Peru

- Location within Peru

Highest point
- Elevation: 5,000 m (16,000 ft)
- Coordinates: 10°22′54″S 76°43′52″W

Geography
- Location: Peru, Huánuco
- Parent range: Andes, Rawra

Chuspiccocha (Quechua ch'uspi insect, generic name of flies or two-winged insects; fly, qucha lake, lagoon, "fly lake" or "insect lake") is a mountain at a lake of that name in the Raura mountain range in the Andes of Peru, about 5,000 m (16,000 ft). It is located in the Huánuco Region, Lauricocha Province, Cauri District.

Lake Chuspi lies southwest of the mountain at 10°24′16″S 76°44′46″W. It is situated at the foot of Chira (4,777 metres (15,673 ft)) at a height of 4,156 metres (13,635 ft).
