= Baños District =

Coordinates: 10°04′22″S 76°44′01″W

- District
- Interactive map of Baños District
- Country: Peru
- Region: Huánuco
- Province: Lauricocha
- Capital: Baños

Government
  - Mayor: Manuel Lolo Gamarra Espinoza

Area
  - Total: 182.66 km^{2} (70.53 sq mi)
- Elevation: 3,409 m (11,184 ft)

Population (2005 census)
  - Total: 5,435
  - Density: 29.75/km^{2} (77.06/sq mi)
- Time zone: UTC-5 (PET)
- UBIGEO: 101002

Baños District is one of seven districts of the province Lauricocha in Peru.
