= Lawriqucha River =

Coordinates: 9.9886°S 76.6824°W

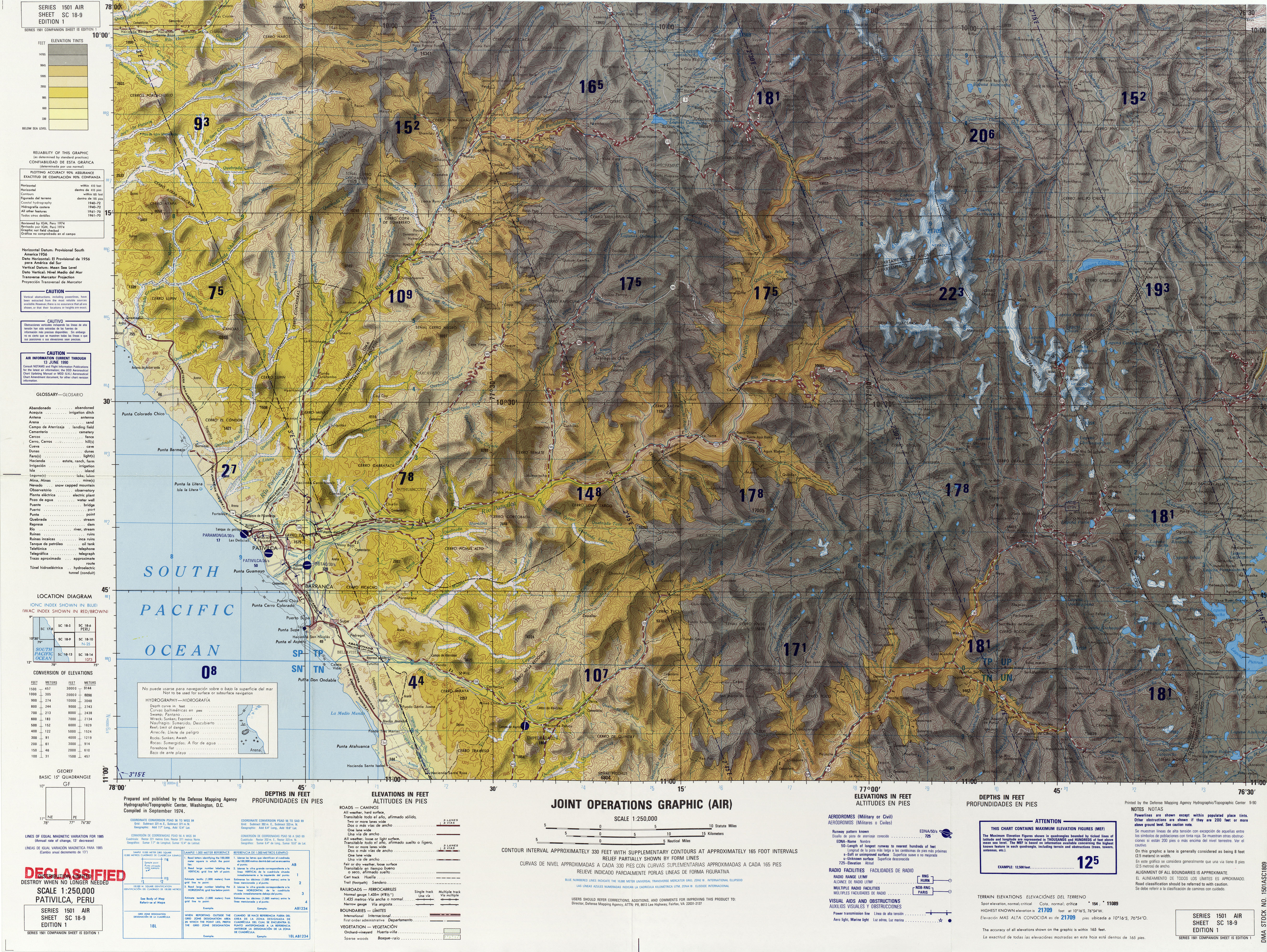
- The headwaters of the Lawriqucha River may be seen in Sections 19 and 22 of this map. Map can be magnified.
- Etymology: Quechua

Location
- Country: Peru
- Region: Huánuco

Physical characteristics
- Mouth: Marañón River

Lawriqucha River (Huánuco Quechua lawri bluish, Quechua qucha lake, lagoon, "bluish lake", hispanicized spelling Lauricocha) is a river in the Huánuco Region in Peru. It belongs to the watershed of the Marañón River. The river is named after the lake Lawriqucha or Lauricocha.

The Lawriqucha River originates in a small glacial lake called Niñococha in the Raura mountain range at an elevation of 4,809 metres (15,778 ft). In 1952 this lake was identified as the source of the Amazon River by an English explorer, Sebastian Snow. Several other sources of the Amazon have been proposed. From Niñococha the river flows north through the Raura mine to Lake Lauricocha. Extensive mining began in the headwaters of the Lauricocha in 1927. The Raura mine is one of the highest in the world operating up to an elevation of 4,791 m (15,719 ft). The extensive area of mining activity has polluted some of the area's lakes and interrupted the flow of the river.

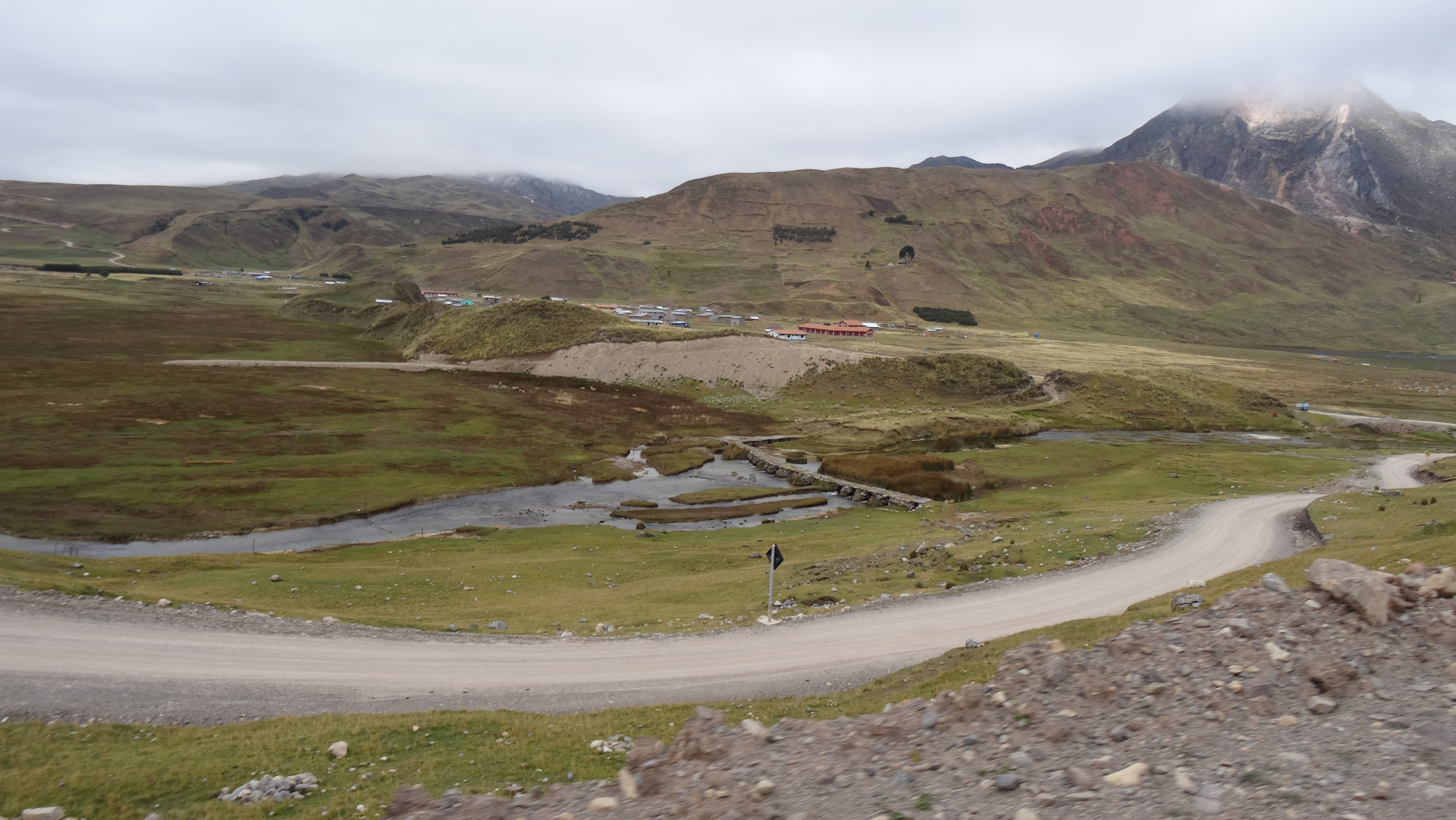
An Inca stone bridge crosses the Lauricocha near the hamlet of Lauricocha.

Near Lauricocha Lake is a stone bridge across the river, dating back to the Inca Empire and still in use for horse and foot travel, and the Lauricocha caves where archaeologists have found evidence of human habitation 10,000 years ago. The river continues flowing north near the villages of Cauri (Kawri), Jesús and Jivia. Near the town of Rondos (Runtus) the Lawriqucha joins the Nupe River to form the Marañón. The elevation at the junction of the rivers is 3,316 metres (10,879 ft).

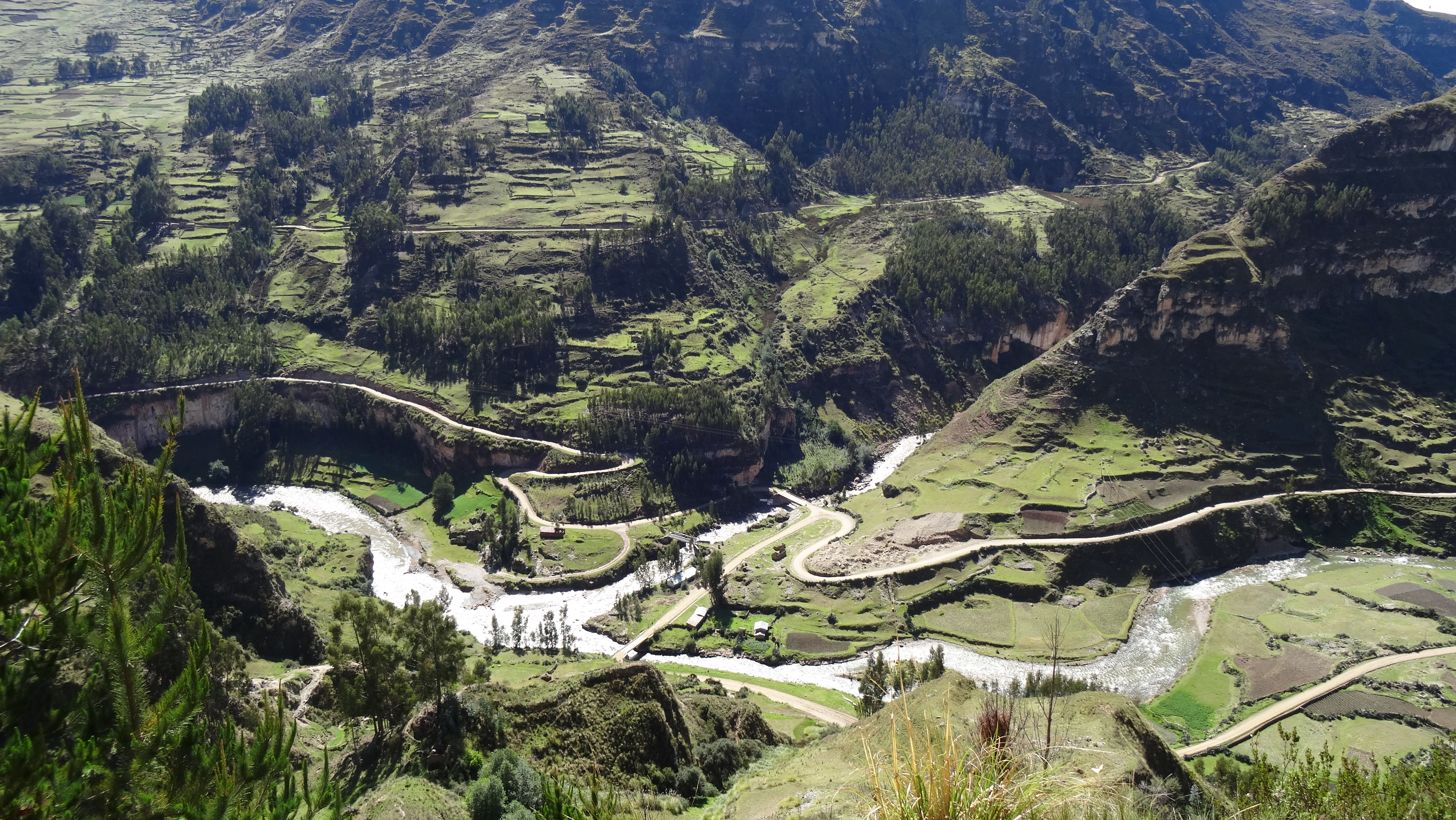
The Nupe (bottom right) joins the Lauricocha River (center) to form the Marañón.

The total length of the Lawriqucha River, in straight-line distance from Niñococha Lake to its junction with the Nupe, is about 50 kilometres (31 miles). A U.S. intelligence agency map of the area calls the lower portion of the Lauricocha River the Quebrada Linda ("Beautiful Gorge").
