= Jivia District =

- District
- Interactive map of Jivia District
- Coordinates: 10°01′16″S 76°42′16″W
- Country: Peru
- Region: Huánuco
- Province: Lauricocha
- Founded: September 6, 1920
- Capital: Jivia

Government
  - Mayor: Romel Espinoza Ambrosio

Area
  - Total: 61.31 km^{2} (23.67 sq mi)
- Elevation: 3,351 m (10,994 ft)

Population (2005 census)
  - Total: 1,928
  - Density: 31.45/km^{2} (81.45/sq mi)
- Time zone: UTC-5 (PET)
- UBIGEO: 101003

Jivia District is one of seven districts of Lauricocha Province in Peru.

== See also ==
- Lawriqucha River
