= Lake Tinquicocha =

Lake in Peru

- Location within Peru
- Location: Huanuco Region
- Coordinates: 10°25′32″S 76°44′07″W
- Basin countries: Peru
- Max. length: 2 km (1.2 mi)
- Max. width: 0.47 km (0.29 mi)
- Surface elevation: 4,365 m (14,321 ft)

Lake Tinquicocha (possibly from Quechua t'inki union, qucha lake) is a lake in Peru located in the Huanuco Region, Lauricocha Province, Cauri District at a height of about 4,365 m. It is located in the Raura mountain range, southeast of Lake Patarcocha, west of Lake Carhuacocha and north of the smaller Lake Puyhuancocha. Lake Tinquicocha is 2 km long and 0.47 km at its widest point.

== See also ==
- List of lakes in Peru
