= Puyhuanccocha =

High mountain in Peru

- Location within Peru

Highest point
- Elevation: 5,200 m (17,100 ft)
- Coordinates: 10°28′11″S 76°43′15″W

Geography
- Location: Peru, Pasco Region
- Parent range: Andes, Raura

Puyhuanccocha (possibly from Quechua puywan heart of an animal, qucha lake, "heart lake") is a mountain in the Raura mountain range in the Andes of Peru. It is located in the boundary of the regions of Huánuco and Pasco. Its summit reaches about 5,200 m (17,060 ft) above sea level.

A lake named Puyhuancocha lies at the northwestern slope of the mountain at 10°27′22″S 76°44′10″W. It is located south of Lake Tinquicocha.
