= Lauricocha, Huánuco =

Lauricocha is a small parish in the central Andean highlands of Peru.

Lauricocha is located at 10°19′20″S 76°40′00″W on the shores of Lago Lauricocha in the Huánuco Region. The parish consists of half a dozen houses, scattered at an elevation of 3,850 m in a sparsely populated area near the village of Antacolpa, and 25 kilometres northwest of Yanahuanca, the capital of the province of Daniel Alcides Carrión.

25 kilometres west of the parish there is Yerupajá, which is the highest mountain in the Cordillera Huayhuash at (6,635 m) and among the ten highest summits in South America.
