= Sebastian Snow =

British explorer (1929–2001)

Sebastian Edward Farquharson Snow, (21 January 1929 – 20 April 2001), born in Midhurst, Sussex, was an English adventurer who is notable for his explorations of the Amazon River.

== Travels ==
Educated at Eton, Snow was exempted from the National Service on account of a sports injury and began his travels at age 22.

This was in 1951, when Snow went on his first expedition to South America, after having answered an advertisement in The Times to join a hydrological survey of the source-waters of the Amazon. With John Brown, he was eventually able to prove that the Ninococha ("Child Lake"), a glacier lake, was the source of the Marañón, the Amazon's most voluminous tributary. This was not ground-breaking news, however, since Ninococha's status as the ultimate source of the Amazon was something previous French explorers to the region had posited on good evidence. Snow and Brown merely confirmed empirically what was already widely believed by geographers. Nevertheless, this expedition remained Snow's chief claim to fame during his lifetime, earning both men election as fellows of the Royal Geographical Society.

Beginning in 1973 in the Argentinian city of Ushuaia, Snow set out to walk the length of the Americas, from Patagonia to Alaska along the Pan-American Highway, a distance of some 15,000 miles. His travel companion during the gruelling and dangerous traversal of the Darién Gap was a young Canadian, Wade Davis, later to gain fame in his own right as an ethno-botanist and author. Severe health problems forced him to take a break shortly after crossing the Darién Gap, but a few months later Snow resumed his journey from the precise point in Costa Rica at which it had been interrupted. However, Snow never completed the second half of his journey, abandoning it only a few weeks later.

Snow's other adventures included motorcycling through Lapland, travelling on foot through much of the Middle East, and climbing Chimborazo, Cotopaxi, and Sangay. At least three online obituaries to Snow may be traced. All those cited mention Brown too.

== Travel books ==
- My Amazon Adventure describes his 1952–3 exploration of the Amazon Basin. John Brown's account of the same trip was called Two Against the Amazon, published by Hodder and Stoughton in 1952.
- The Rucksack Man describes his walk from Patagonia to Costa Rica.
- Half a Dozen of the Other describes six of his other South American expeditions.
