= Marañón River =

Marañón River Spanish: Río Marañón
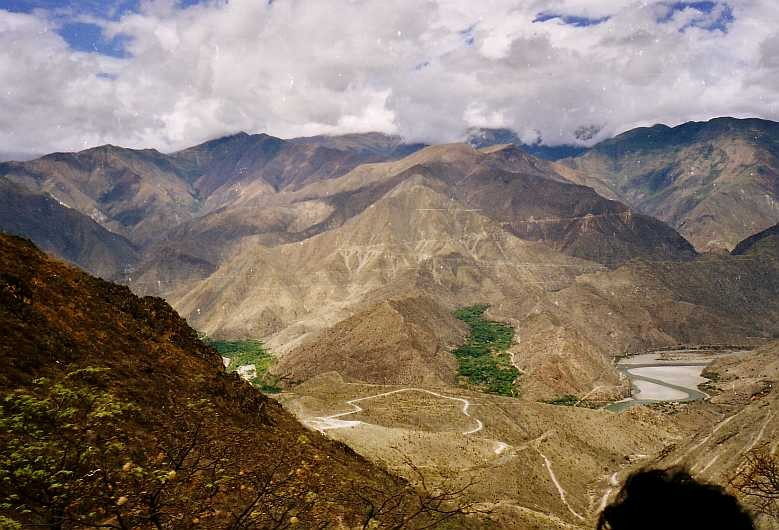
- Valley of the Marañón between Chachapoyas (Leimebamba) and Celendín

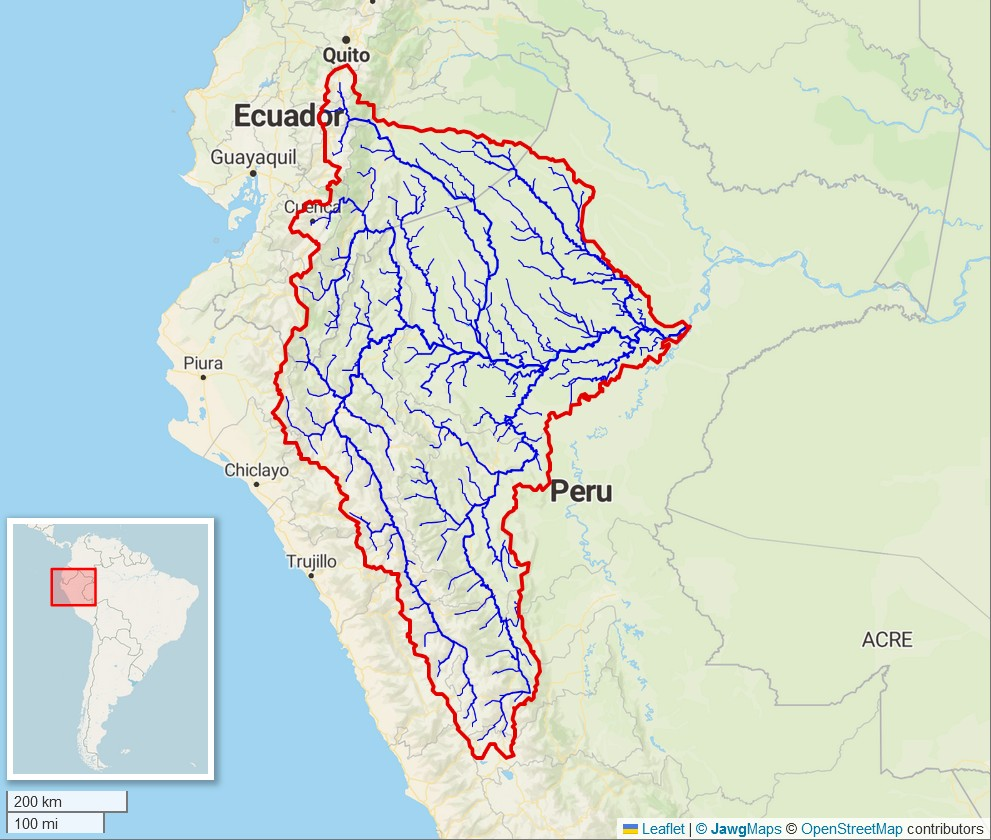
- Marañón River watershed (Interactive map)
- Native name: Awriq mayu (Quechua)

Location
- Country: Peru

Physical characteristics
- Source: Andes
  - location: Confluence of Lauricocha and Nupe
  - coordinates: 9°59′16.674″S 76°40′58.854″W
  - elevation: 3,304 m (10,840 ft)
- 2nd source: Nupe
  - location: Huayhuash
  - coordinates: 10°16′44.598″S 76°52′3.2268″W
  - elevation: 4,351 m (14,275 ft)
- 3rd source: Lauricocha
  - location: Raura
  - coordinates: 10°25′23.88″S 76°44′7.4544″W
  - elevation: 4,964 m (16,286 ft)
- Mouth: Amazon River
  - coordinates: 4°26′43.4076″S 73°27′11.5812″W
  - elevation: 0 m (0 ft)
- Length: 1,737 km (1,079 mi)
- Basin size: 358,000 km^{2} (138,000 mi^{2}) to 364,873.4 km^{2} (140,878.4 mi^{2})
- Discharge
  - location: Confluence of Ucayali
  - average: (Period: 1965–2013)16,675.89 m^{3}/s (588,903 cu ft/s) 16,708 m^{3}/s (590,000 cu ft/s) (Period: 1971–2000)17,957.6 m^{3}/s (634,170 cu ft/s)

Basin features
- Progression: Amazon → Atlantic Ocean
- River system: Amazon
- Tributaries
  - left: Tigre, Cunincu, Urituyacu, Nucuray, Ungumayo, Pastaza, Sasipahua, Morona, Cangaza, Santiago, Cenepa, Chinchipe, Choros, Linlín, Artesamayo, Choropampa, Magdalena, Cortegana, Chipche, Mireles, Chusgón, San Sebastián, Casga, Mamara, Mayas, Actuy, Rupac, Yanamayo, Puchca, Contan, Vizcarra, Nupe
  - right: Yanayacu, Huallaga, Cahuapanas, Potro, Apaga, Samiria, Nieva, Cananya, Chiriaco, Utcubamba, Congón, Rumirumi, Shuve, Chumuch, Pusac, Lavasen, Gansul, San Miguel, Challas, Tantamayo, San Juan, Lauricocha

The Marañón River (Spanish: Río Marañón, IPA: [ˈri.o maɾaˈɲon], Quechua: Awriq mayu) is the principal or mainstem source of the Amazon River, arising about 160 km (100 miles) to the northeast of Lima, Peru, and flowing northwest across plateaus 3,650 m (12,000 feet) high, it runs through a deeply eroded Andean valley, along the eastern base of the Cordillera of the Andes, as far as 5° 36′ southern latitude; from where it makes a great bend to the northeast, and cuts through the jungle Ande in its midcourse, until at the Pongo de Manseriche it flows into the flat Amazon basin. Although historically, the term "Marañón River" often was applied to the river all the way to the Atlantic Ocean, nowadays the Marañón River is generally thought to end at the confluence with the Ucayali River, after which most cartographers label the ensuing waterway the Amazon River.

As the Marañón passes through high jungle in its midcourse, it is marked by a series of unnavigable rapids and falls.

The Marañón was the subject of a landmark legal ruling related to the rights of nature. In March 2024, a Peruvian court ruled in response to a case brought by Mari Luz Canaquiri Murayari that the river itself has fundamental rights, including the right to ecological flows and to be free from pollution.

== Geography ==
The Marañón River is Peru's second-longest river, according to a 2005 statistical publication by the Instituto Nacional de Estadística e Informática.

== Source of the Amazon ==
The Marañón River was considered the source of the Amazon River starting with the 1707 map published by Padre Samuel Fritz, who indicated the great river "has its source on the southern shore of a lake that is called Lauriocha, near Huánuco." Fritz believed that the Marañón contributed the most water of all the Amazon's tributaries, making it the most important headstream.

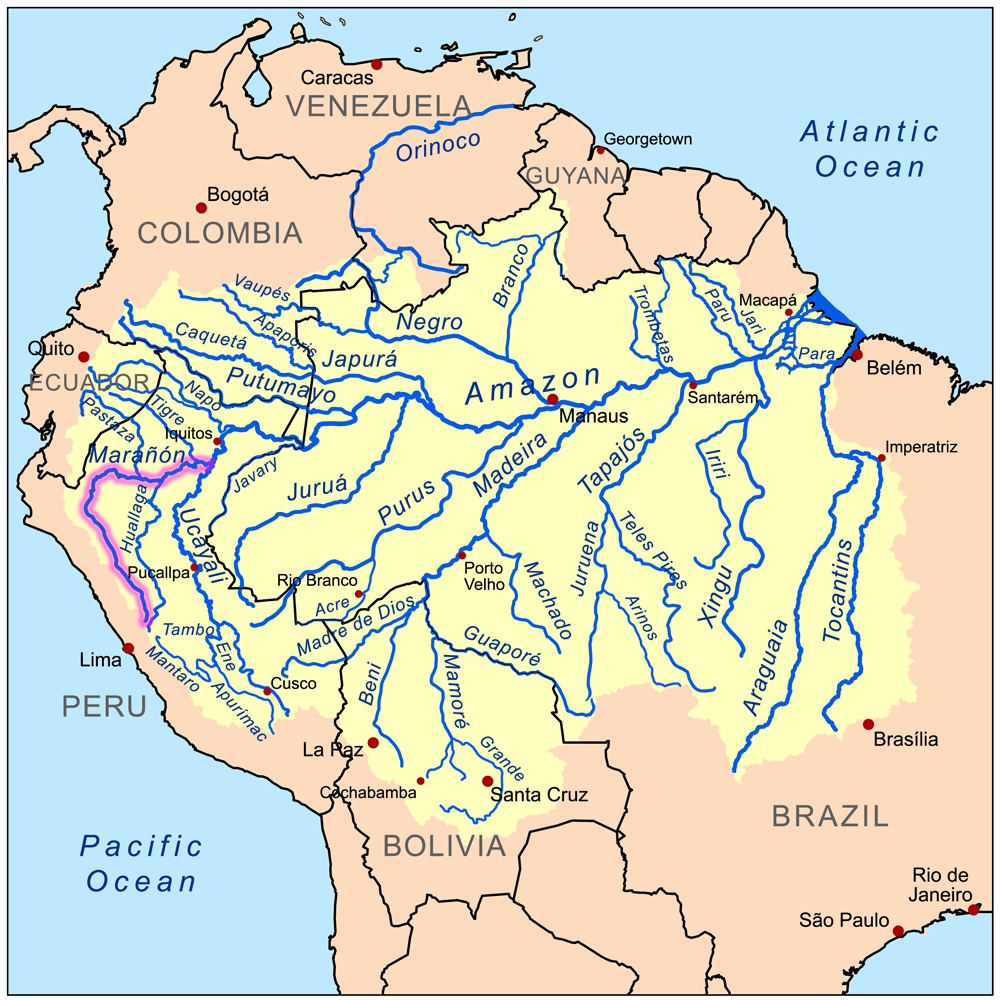
Location of the Marañón within the Amazon Basin

For most of the 18th–19th centuries and into the 20th century, the Marañón River was generally considered the source of the Amazon. Later explorations have proposed two headwaters rivers of the Marañón in the high Andes as sources of the Amazon: the Lauricocha and Nupe Rivers. The Lauricocha and Nupe unite near the village of Rondos to form from their confluence downstream the river that is called the Marañón.

Although the Apurimac and Mantaro rivers also have claims to being the source of the Amazon, the Marañón River continues to claim the title of the "mainstem source" or "hydrological source" of the Amazon due to its contribution of the highest annual discharge rates.

== Description ==
The initial section of the Marañón contains a plethora of pongos, which are gorges in the jungle areas often with difficult rapids. The Pongo de Manseriche is the final pongo on the Marañón located just before the river enters the flat Amazon basin. It is 5 km (3.1 mi) long and located between the confluence with the Rio Santiago and the village of Borja. According to Captain Carbajal, who attempted ascent through the Pongo de Manseriche in the little steamer Napo, in 1868, it is a vast rent in the Andes about 600 m (2000 ft) deep, narrowing in places to a width of only 30 m (100 ft), the precipices "seeming to close in at the top." Through this canyon, the Marañón leaps along, at times, at the rate of 20 km/h (12 mi/h). The pongo is known for wrecking many ships and many drownings.

Downstream of the Pongo de Manseriche, the river often has islands, and usually nothing is visible from its low banks, but an immense forest-covered plain known as the selva baja (low jungle) or Peruvian Amazonia. It is home to indigenous peoples such as the Urarina of the Chambira Basin , the Candoshi, and the Cocama-Cocamilla peoples.

A 552-km (343-mi) section of the Marañón River between Puente Copuma (Puchka confluence) and Corral Quemado is a class IV raftable river that is similar in many ways to the Grand Canyon of the United States, and has been labeled the "Grand Canyon of the Amazon". Most of this section of the river is in a canyon that is up to 3000 m deep on both sides – over twice the depth of the Colorado's Grand Canyon. It is in dry, desert-like terrain, much of which receives only 250–350 mm/rain per year (10–14 in/yr) with parts such as from Balsas to Jaén known as the hottest infierno area of Peru. The Marañón Grand Canyon section flows by the village of Calemar, where Peruvian writer Ciro Alegría based one of his most important novels, La serpiente de oro (1935).

== Historical journeys ==
=== La Condamine, 1743 ===
One of the first popular descents of the Marañón River occurred in 1743, when Frenchman Charles Marie de La Condamine journeyed from the Chinchipe confluence all the way to the Atlantic Ocean. La Condamine did not descend the initial section of the Marañón by boat due to the pongos. From where he began his boating descent at the Chiriaco confluence, La Condamine still had to confront several pongos, including the Pongo de Huaracayo (or Guaracayo) and the Pongo de Manseriche.

=== Flornoy, 1941-1942 ===
In 1936, Bertrand Flornoy was appointed chargé de mission at the National Museum of Natural History of France, which sent him on study and exploration missions in Amazonia and the Andes. He specialised in the Peruvian Upper Amazon, and in 1941 and 1942 discovered the sources of the Río Marañón, one of the tributaries of the Amazon.

=== The Grand Canyon of the Amazon ===
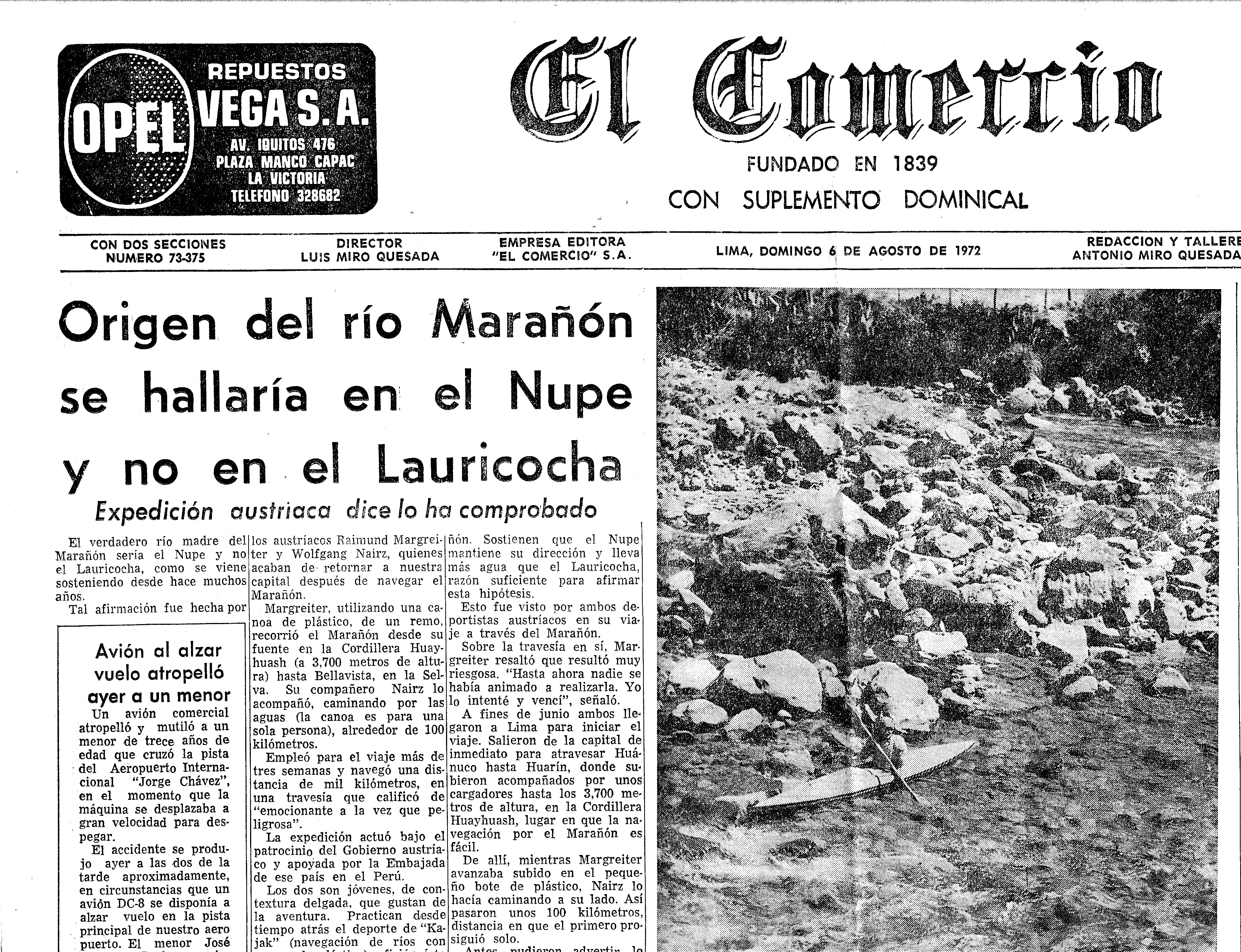
Photo of the front page of the Peruvian daily newspaper El Comercio from August 6, 1972, featuring a report on the first kayaking expedition down the headwaters of the Amazon — the Marañón River and Nupe River — by Austrian surgeon and mountaineer Raimund Margreiter.

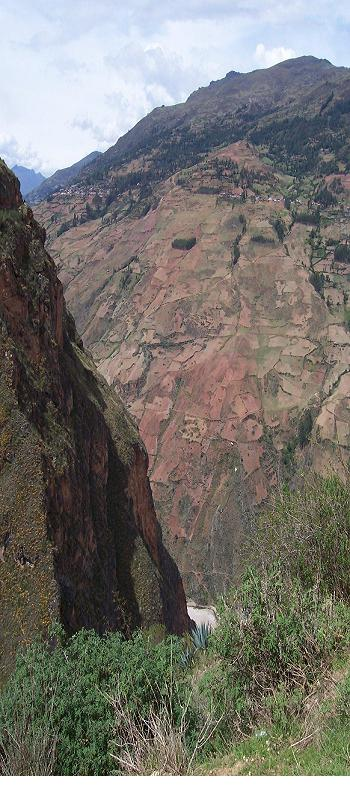
Marañón River as seen from Quchapata in Peru

The upper Marañón River has seen a number of descents. An attempt to paddle the river was made by Herbert Rittlinger in 1936. Sebastian Snow was an adventurer who journeyed down most of the river by trekking to Chiriaco River starting at the source near Lake Niñacocha.

In 1972, Austrian surgeon and mountaineer Raimund Margreiter became the first person to kayak down the upper Amazon River. His expedition, during which he was initially accompanied overland by Wolfgang Nairz, took him down the Marañón River from an elevation of 3,700 meters to Bellavista at 280 meters above sea level. During this journey, they also identified the Nupe River as the source of the Amazon River.

In 1976 and/or 1977, Laszlo Berty descended the section from Chagual to the jungle in a raft. In 1977, a group composed of Tom Fisher, Steve Gaskill, Ellen Toll, and John Wasson spent over a month descending the river from Rondos to Nazareth with kayaks and a raft. In 2004, Tim Biggs and companions kayaked the entire river from the Nupe River to Iquitos. In 2012, Rocky Contos descended the entire river with various companions along the way.

== Hydroelectric dams ==
The Marañón River may supply 20 hydroelectric mega-dams planned in the Andes, and most of the power is thought to be destined for export to Brazil, Chile, or Ecuador. Dam survey crews have drafted construction blueprints, and the environmental impact statements have been available since November 2009 for the Veracruz dam, and since November 2011, the Chadin2 dam. A 2011 law stated "national demand" for the hydroelectric energy, while in 2013, Peruvian President Ollanta Humala explicitly made a connection with mining; the energy is to supply mines in the Cajamarca Region, La Libertad, Ancash Region, and Piura Region. Construction of the 406 MW dam in Chaglla District started in 2012.

=== Concerns ===
Opposition arose because the dams are expected to disrupt the major source of the Amazon, alter normal silt deposition into the lower river, damage habitat and migration patterns for fish and other aquatic life, displace thousands of residents along the river, and damage a national treasure "at least as nice as the Grand Canyon in the USA". Residents have launched efforts to halt the dams along the river with conservation groups such as SierraRios and International Rivers.

Potential ecological impacts of 151 new dams greater than 2 MW on five of the six major Andean tributaries of the Amazon over the next 20 years are estimated to be high, including the first major break in connectivity between Andean headwaters and lowland Amazon and deforestation due to infrastructure.

== Water Pollution ==
The Marañón River has been polluted by oil pipelines and mining activities in its watershed. Between 1970 and 2019, over 60 spills have been documented from the Norperuano oil pipeline. Mercury and other toxic chemicals have been released from illegal mining.

== See also ==
- Extinct languages of the Marañón River basin
- List of rivers of Peru
- Loreto Region
- Maina Indians
- World Commission on Dams
