= Lake Lauricocha =

Lake in Huanuco, Peru

- Location within Peru

- Coordinates: 10.311°S 76.697°W
- Basin countries: Peru
- Max. length: 7 km (4.3 mi)
- Max. width: 1.5 km (0.93 mi)
- Surface elevation: 3,856 m (12,651 ft)

Lake Lauricocha (possibly from Huánuco Quechua lawri bluish, Quechua qucha lake, lagoon, "bluish lake") is a lake in the Andes mountains of central Peru, within Huánuco Region.

== Geography ==
The lake, formed by glacial action, is located on the western slopes of the Raura mountain range and the Cordillera Huayhuash which rises to elevations of more than 6,000 metres (20,000 ft). The lake has a surface elevation of 3,856 metres (12,651 ft) and has an east-west orientation. It is 7 kilometres (4 mi) long, 1.5 kilometres (1 mi) wide and has an average depth of 75 metres (246 ft) The lake is part of the basin of the Lauricocha River, A Jesuit priest named Samuel Fritz drew a map in 1707 which showed the Marañón River as the main stream of the Amazon River. He identified Lake Lauricocha as the source of the Amazon. Several additional places have since been proposed as sources of the Amazon.

The Lauricocha River flows out of the lake. A hamlet also called Lauricocha is near the outlet of the lake. A stone bridge dating from the Inca Empire crosses the river. The bridge is part of the Qhapac nan, the Inca road system, which passed here enroute from Cuzco to Quito in present-day Ecuador. Overlooking the lake is Lauricocha cave, an archaeological site with evidence of human beings residing there 12,000 years ago.

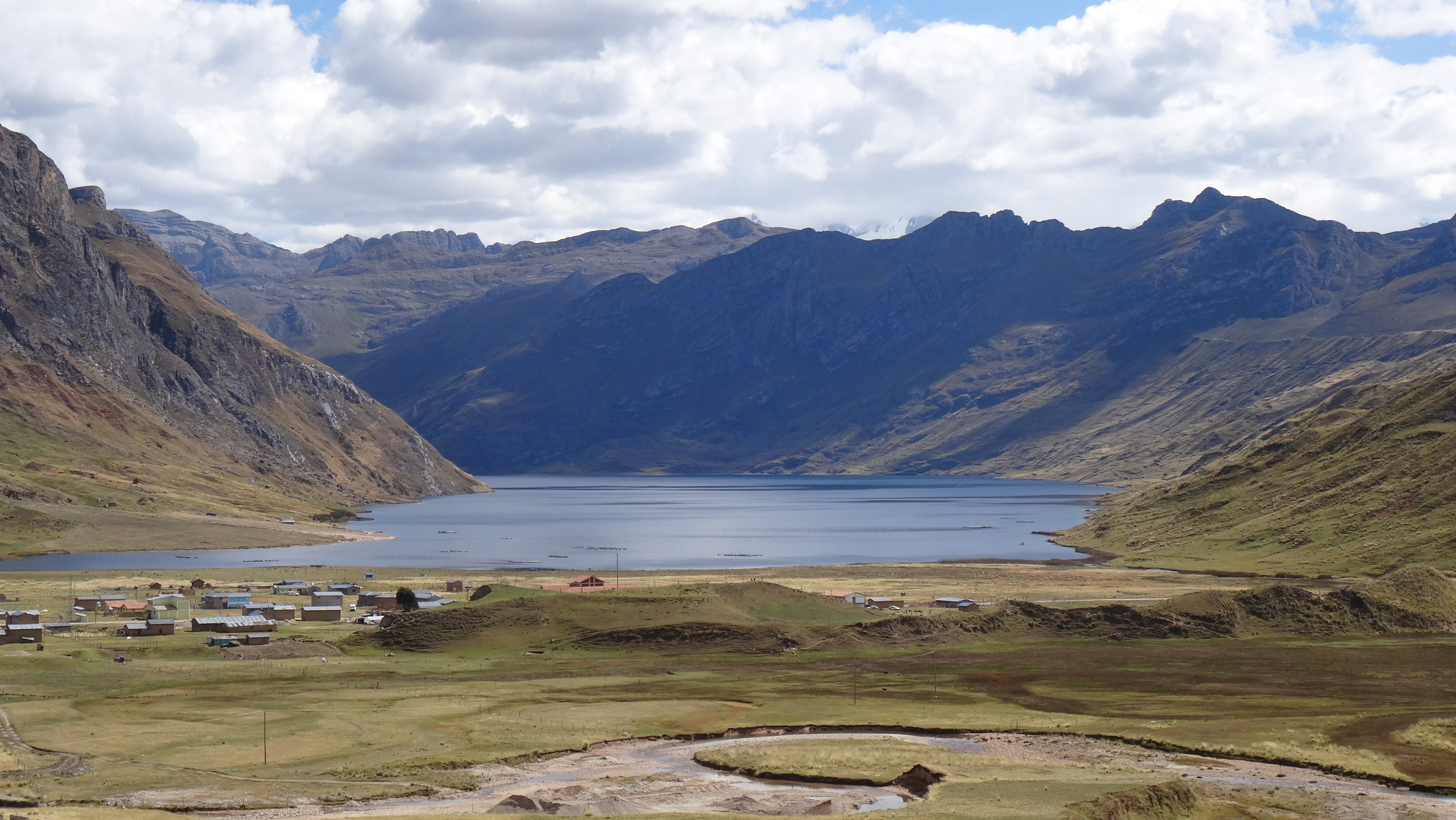
Lake Lauricocha and the hamlet of Lauricocha at the outlet of the lake.

== Ecology ==
The predominant species of fish in the lake is the introduced rainbow trout. Among the fauna present around the lake are birds like ducks, tinamous and hawks; and mammals like tarucas, vizcachas, foxes and skunks.
