= 1955 British Kangchenjunga expedition =

First ascent of the 3rd highest mountain

Coordinates: 27°42′09″N 88°08′48″E

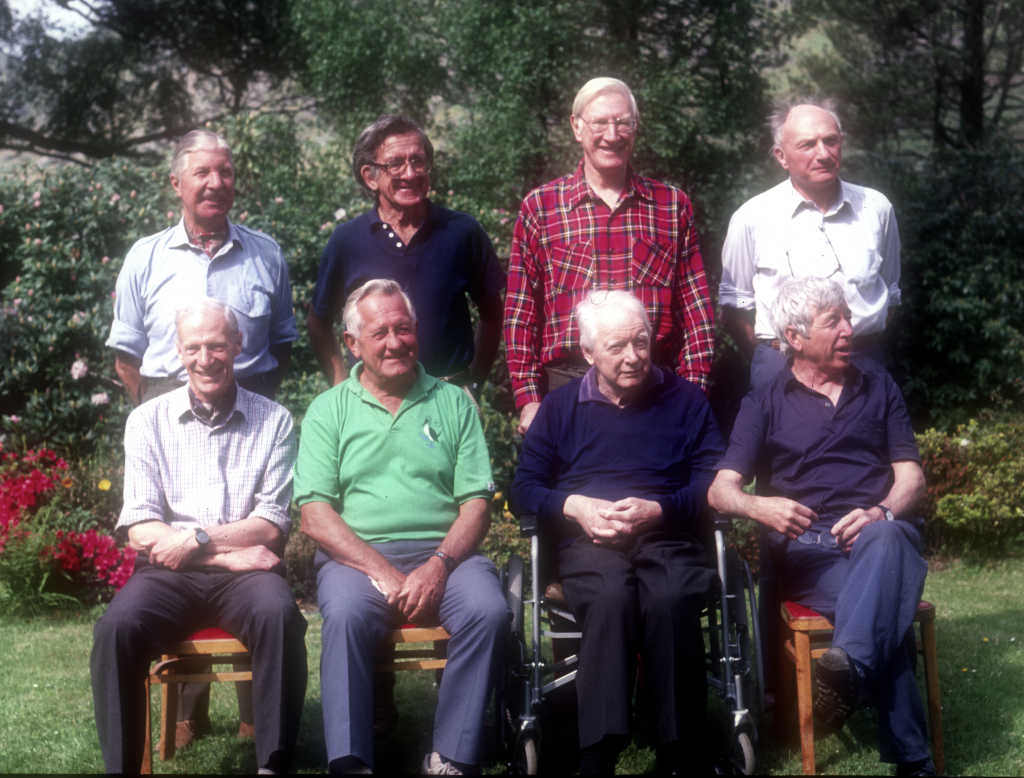
Kangchenjunga expedition 1990 reunion at the Pen-y-Gwryd Hotel, showing, left to right: Back: Tony Streather, Norman Hardie, George Band and John Clegg Front: Neil Mather, John Jackson, Charles Evans and Joe Brown

The 1955 British Kangchenjunga expedition succeeded in climbing the 28,168-foot (8,586 m) Kangchenjunga, the third highest mountain in the world, for the first time. The expedition complied with a request from the Sikkim authorities that the summit should not be trodden on so the climbers deliberately stopped about five feet below the summit. George Band and Joe Brown reached the top on 25 May 1955, and they were followed the next day by Norman Hardie and Tony Streather. The expedition was led by Charles Evans who had been deputy leader on the 1953 British Mount Everest expedition.

The expedition trekked from Darjeeling in India along the border with Sikkim and then through Nepal to the Yalung Valley. They unsuccessfully attempted a climbing route reconnoitred by a team led by John Kempe the year before but succeeded along a different route up the Yalung Face, one that Aleister Crowley's 1905 Kanchenjunga expedition had first attempted.

In mountaineering circles at the time and more recently, the climb is sometimes regarded as a greater achievement than the ascent of Mount Everest two years earlier.

== Background ==
=== Political ===
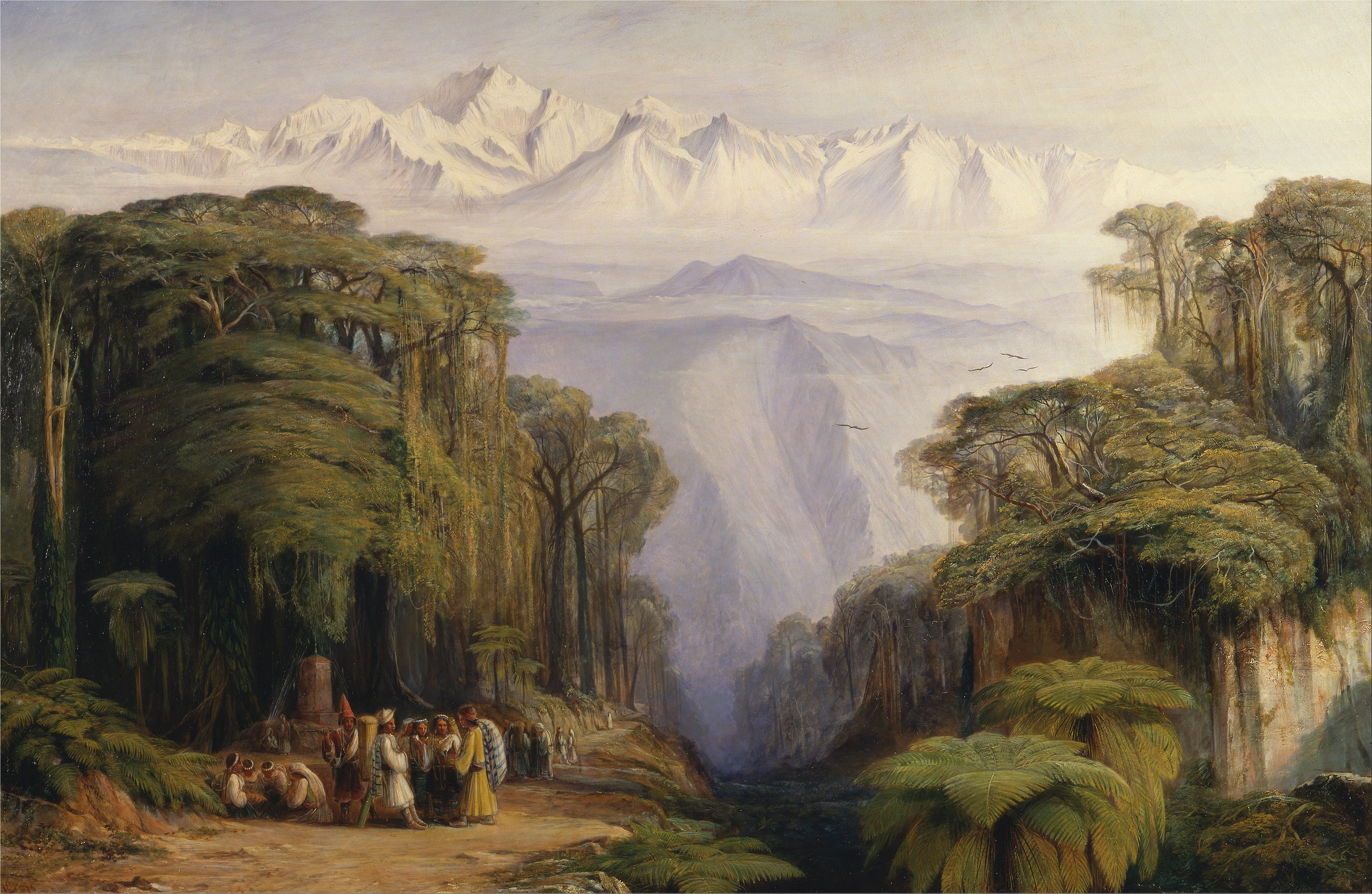
Painting by Edward Lear of Kangchenjunga seen from Darjeeling in India

Following the ascent of Everest in 1953 and K2 in 1954, Kangchenjunga, the third highest mountain in the world, had become the highest unclimbed mountain. The mountain is on the border between Nepal and Sikkim and can be approached from either side. It is the most widely visible of the 8000-metre peaks and can be well seen from Darjeeling in West Bengal. In 1955 Sikkim had a degree of control over its internal affairs and would not allow any attempt to climb the mountain. However, from 1950 Nepal had been permitting a few mountaineering expeditions, particularly enabling reconnaissance of routes to Everest, and were willing to allow an attempt on Kangchenjunga from the west.

=== Exploration ===
Kangchenjunga is a highly active mountain with avalanches constantly streaming down its sides. It is somewhat distanced from the line of the Himalayas and, because it is near where the monsoon approaches from the Bay of Bengal, the monsoon season persists longer than for any other of the eight-thousanders.

Throughout the 20th century and from even before that time, the mountain had been explored by many teams and the two routes attempted in 1955 – both of them up the Yalung Face of the mountain from the Yalung glacier – had been reconnoitred in 1905 by a Swiss team led by Jules Jacot-Guillarmod with Aleister Crowley as climbing leader (Note: Crowley describes the 1905 expedition in The Confessions of Aleister Crowley.) and by John Kempe in 1954. (Note: Kempe (1955) describes the 1954 expedition.) Kempe's report led to the Alpine Club agreeing to sponsor a reconnaissance effort which might also attempt to reach the summit.

A detailed map of the region was produced by Marcel Kurz in 1931.

=== Team members ===
The members of the team were led by Charles Evans (36 years of age at the time of the climb), who had been deputy leader on the 1953 British Mount Everest expedition. The rest of the team included:

- Norman Hardie (30 years), a New Zealander, was deputy leader and had explored the Barun Valley with Edmund Hillary in 1954.
- George Band (26 years), had been on the 1953 Mount Everest expedition and was responsible for food.
- Joe Brown (24 years), was an outstanding rock climber in Britain and the Alps.
- John Clegg (29 years) was the expedition doctor and an Alpine climber.
- John Jackson (34 years), with considerable Himalayan experience, had been on the 1954 Kangchenjunga reconnaissance expedition.
- Tom McKinnon (42 years) was the expedition photographer with considerable Himalayan experience.
- Neil Mather (28 years) was an ice and snow climber in the Alps.
- Tony Streather (29 years), with broad mountaineering experience including on the 1953 American Karakoram expedition, was responsible for porters and had knowledge of Hindustani.
- Dawa Tensing (about 45 years) was sirdar (chief Sherpa). He had been Evans' personal Sherpa on the 1952 Cho Oyu and 1953 Everest expeditions where he had twice reached the South Col. (Note: Dawa Tensing is not to be confused with Tenzing Norgay who had also been on the 1952 Swiss and 1953 British Everest expeditions.)
- Annullu, deputy sirdar, had also been at the South Col in 1953. There were about 30 Sherpas from Solu Khumbu (Note: Sherpas named were: Dawa Tensing, Annullu, Aila, Ang Dawa (from Kunde), Ang Dawa (from Namche Bazaar), Ang Norbu, Ang Temba, Changjup, Da Tsering, Gyalgen, Hlakpa Sonar, Ila Tenzing, Lobsang, Mingma Tenzing, Pasang Sonar, Phurchita, Pemi Dorje, Tashi, Topke, Urkien.) and 300 porters from Darjeeling.

=== Equipment ===
Considerable advances had been made in equipment in preparation for the 1953 Everest expedition and so additional changes for 1955 were less substantial. Rather than taking vacuum-packed, high-altitude food, they took packs for ten-man-days to be shared out so individual tastes could be better accommodated.

Their high-altitude boots were of a neater design which allowed for canvas overboots and crampons on top of the whole lot. Their oxygen equipment was improved in design. Supplemental oxygen was used by the climbers above Camp 3 and by the Sherpas above Camp 5. They took two closed-circuit sets, largely for experimental purposes, but they relied on open-circuit systems which were also found to be generally more satisfactory. A set weighed only 80% of the Everest design. The flow valves were made of rubber to avoid problems of blockage by ice but unfortunately, when the rubber became cold and rigid overnight, the valves would leak badly when turned on in the morning. Early starts were sometimes delayed while the equipment was being warmed up. Another problem was that the climbers lost weight during the climb so that their face masks no longer fitted well and this also caused a waste of gas. Worse, the leak could cause their goggles to mist up – removing these, even just to wipe them, risked becoming snowblind. In all, 6 long tons (6.1 tonnes) of supplies had to be carried from Darjeeling.

== Expedition ==
=== Departure for Darjeeling ===
Shortly before they sailed from Liverpool on 12 February 1955, they were told that for spiritual reasons the Sikkim government objected to any attempt at all to climb the mountain, even from Nepal, so before they departed Darjeeling Evans went to Gangtok to visit the Dewan (prime minister) with whom he reached a compromise that the expedition could go ahead provided that once they were sure of being able to reach the summit they would go no higher and they would not desecrate the vicinity of the summit. (Note: George Band wrote: "Europeans are not alone in admiring it, for the devout Sikkimese, in whose country the whole East face lies, accord it the reverence given to a god, and to them we owe its name, Kang-chen-dzö-nga, meaning 'The Five Sacred Treasuries of the Snows'. In their view, any attempt to climb the mountain, even from the Nepalese side, would be a form of sacrilege, so it was necessary for Charles Evans to make a special journey to Gangtok to discuss the problem with the Dewan (their 'Prime Minister'), representing the Sikkim Durbar. His friendly and understanding mediation resulted in permission for us to continue with our plans, provided that we pledged ourselves to observe two conditions: not to go beyond the point on the mountain at which we were assured of a route to the top, and not, however high our reconnaissance might take us, to desecrate the immediate neighbourhood of the summit. It was a happy solution, to which we, as mountaineers, were glad to agree, and one which promised better for our future friendship than a stiff ungenerous attitude on either side would have done.") (Note: Doug Scott wrote: "The expedition was brilliantly led by Charles Evans who created a wonderful team effort that put George [Band] and Joe Brown in position to make the first ascent ... to within 10 ft of the summit. There they stopped, in deference to the people of Sikkim who had requested that the climbers not disturb the protecting deities that they said dwelt on the summit".)

=== March-in and first base camp ===
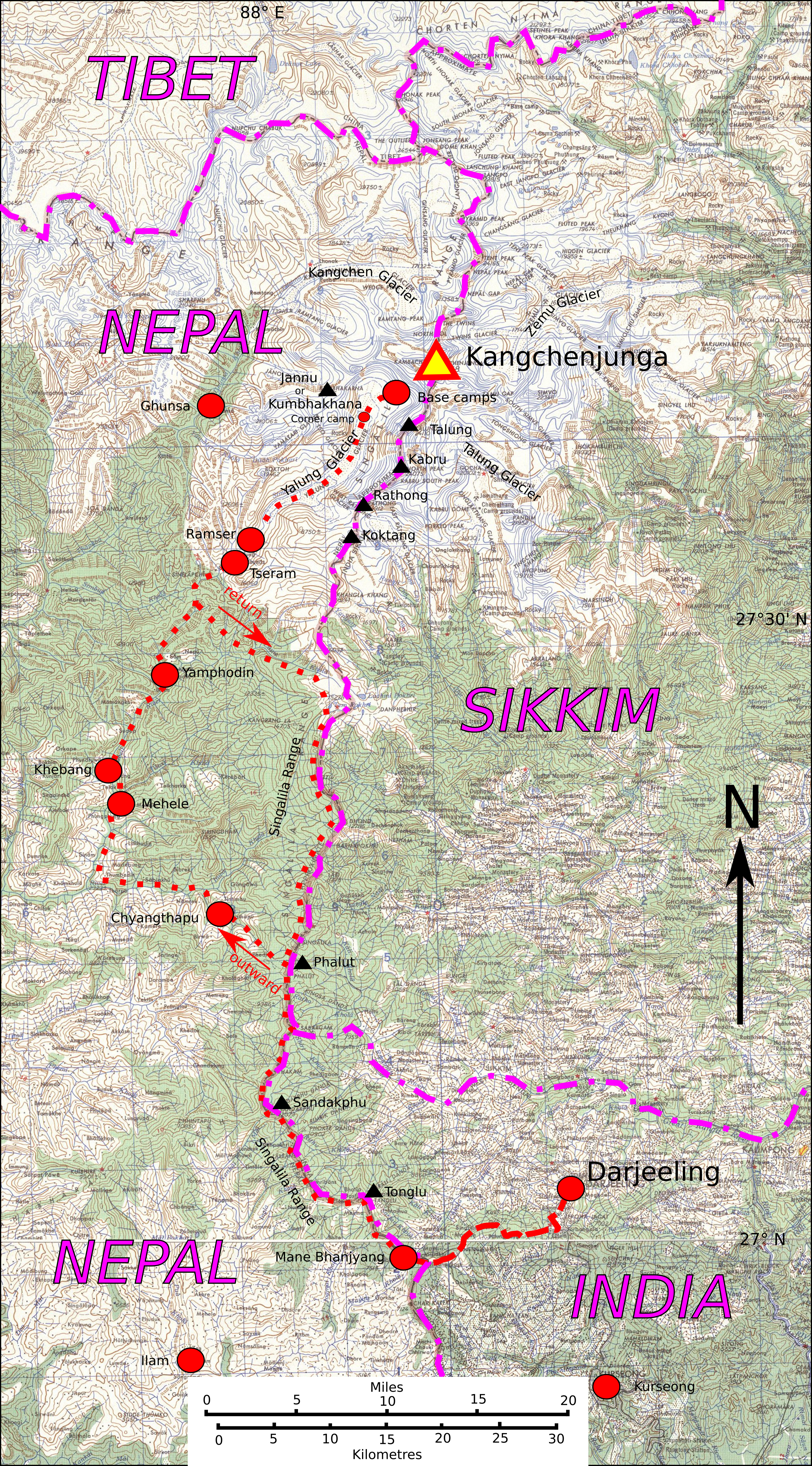
Route to the mountain from Darjeeling

They left Darjeeling on 14 March for the 16-mile (26 km) journey to Mane Bhanjyang transporting their baggage in a convoy of dilapidated trucks. (Note: From Darjeeling to Kangchenjunga in a direct line is some 46 miles (74 km) but the party's route was twice as long.) This was the last large village on the road before their 10-day trek started on a track up to the crest of the Singalila Ridge from where, at 10,000 feet (3,000 m), there were three Indian government rest houses along the route north, the first being at Tonglu. At Phalut they turned west to enter the jungles of Nepal. After Chyangthapu they headed north again through intensively cultivated terraced land. At Khebang (now Khewang) there was a long climb up to the pass leading to the Yalung valley where there was again jungle, which eventually turned into the gravel outwash of the Yalung glacier. After Tseram (now Cheram) were the remains of a monastery at Ramser and, near the terminal moraine of the 13-mile (21 km) Yalung glacier at 13,000 feet (4,000 m), the porters were paid off because the route up the glacier was too difficult for them. Yalung Camp was established as a substantial camp from where to acclimatise by climbing many nearby peaks. (Note: Jannu and Kabru were particularly conspicuous from Yalung Camp but these mountains were not climbed.) Accurate theodolite measurements were taken of features in the vicinity of Kangchenjunga's Yalung, or southwest, face. A supply chain for food for the Sherpas – tsampa and atta – was organised from Ghunsa village two days carry away. Also, plans were made for the future moving of goods from Yalung to a base camp much higher up the glacier.

The trek to Yalung Camp had taken 10 days and when they left after their acclimatisation period there was a four-day trek up the glacier to a base camp to be established at the foot of Kempe's Buttress, at the foot of the route suggested by the reconnaissance of the year before. Because the porters had been paid off the trek to base camp had to be done repeatedly in very poor weather. The left bank (southeastern side) of the glacier was subject to continual avalanches from Talung so they took the right bank even though the ice was very broken there.

=== Attempt via Kempe's Buttress ===
Kempe's Buttress flanks the eastern side of an icefall that descends Kangchenjunga from about 23,500 feet (7,200 m) to the glacier at 18,000 feet (5,500 m). The top of the buttress is at 19,500 feet (5,900 m) and from there Kempe had thought there might be a feasible way further up the icefall. (Note: Band says the Upper Icefall is 3,500 feet (1,100 m) and the Lower 2,000 feet (610 m) high descending to the Yalung Glacier at 18,000 feet (5,500 m). Kempe estimated the altitude of the top of Buttress at 20,000–21,000 feet (6,100–6,400 m) whereas Evans says 19,500 feet (5,900 m).) From the top of the Buttress, however, Band and Hardie took two days trying to get onto the icefall itself. Evans and Jackson joined the effort and although they then managed to get onto the icefall they could make no further progress. Band, who had climbed Everest's Khumbu Icefall, wrote:

We spent two days of the most exhilarating ice-climbing of our lives, trying to find a route through ... it made the Khumbu Icefall look like a children's playground ... Were we to be defeated so soon?

Fortunately, Hardie spotted a small glacier descending the Western Buttress – the wall on the far side of the glacier – and the small glacier reached down from a location they called the "Hump" to a point on the icefall roughly level with their vantage point. (Note: Trevor Braham says this ramp was spotted on the 1954 reconnaissance from the slopes of Talung Peak. The 1955 party estimated the altitude of the pass over the Hump as 20,500 feet (6,200 m).) So, they decided to abandon their present attempt and try all over again hoping to reach the western side of the icefall. The intention was to climb up to the Hump along the western side of the Western Buttress and to achieve this involved moving base camp.

Attempt starting at Kempe's Buttress
Camp	Altitude (Note: Altitudes in metres calculated from referenced figures in feet.)		Date occupied (1955)	Description
Camp	feet	metres	Date occupied (1955)	Description
Base	18,000	5,500	12 April	Kempe's second base camp
Camp 1	19,500	5,900	19 April	Top of Kempe's buttress (Note: Kempe's high point (but estimated by Kempe at 20,000–21,000 feet (6,100–6,400 m)..)
high point	20,000	6,100	22 April	Height reached on this route by 1955 party. They descended after observing an alternative route.

=== Attempt from Pache's grave ===
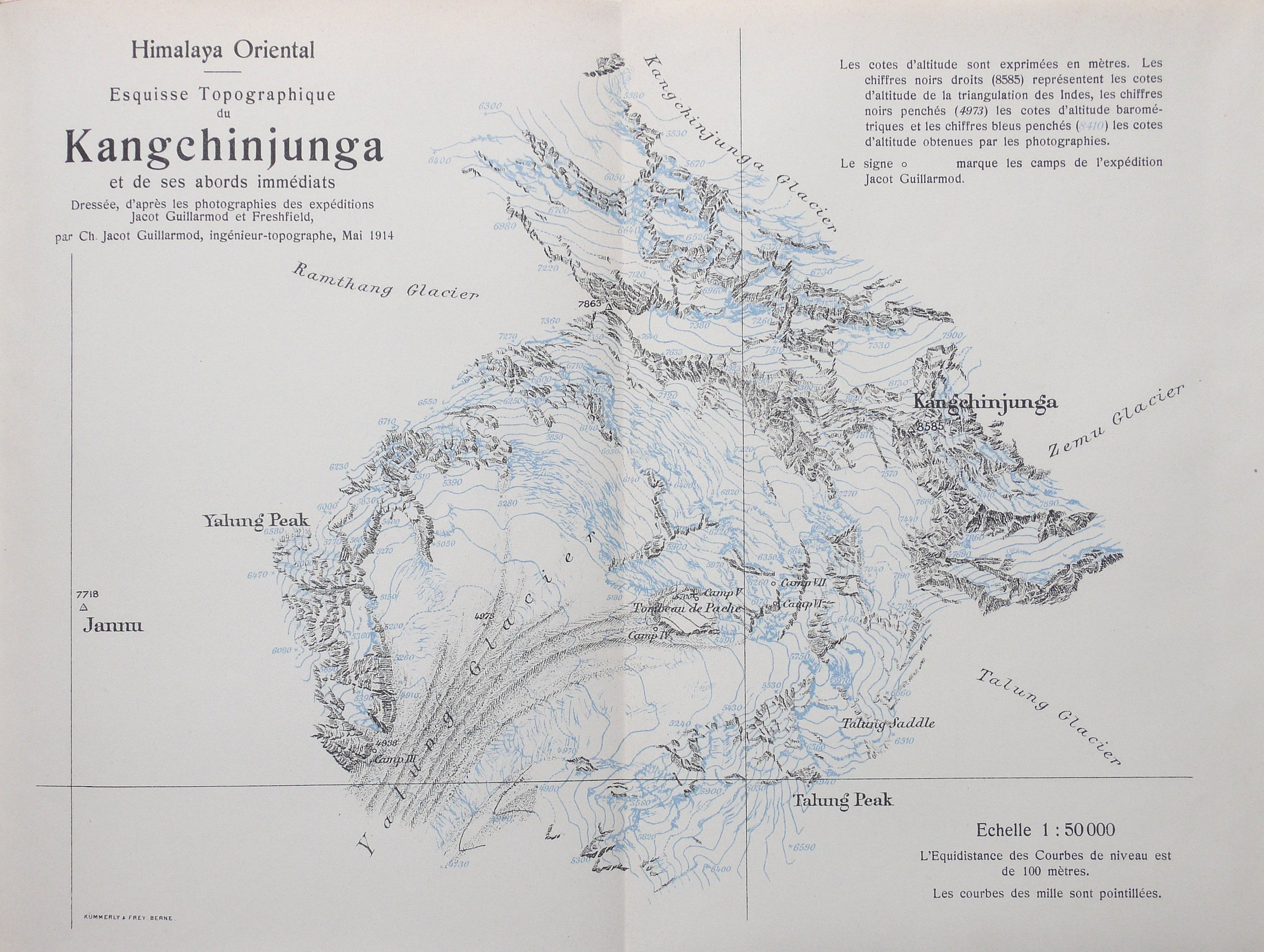
1914 map drawn by Jules Jacot-Guillarmod employing photographs from the 1899 Freshfield and 1905 Jacot-Guillarmod expeditions. The 1905 camps are marked, camp V being beside Pache's grave.

As it happens the location of the second base camp was where, on Crowley's 1905 expedition, Alexis Pache and three porters were laid to rest after they had been killed in an avalanche. The wooden cross and gravestone still stood there. Kempe's team had investigated the area the previous year but considered it would tend to lead towards the subsidiary peak Kangchenjunga West leaving a difficult traverse to the main summit. Also, the route was vulnerable to avalanches.

Evans' plan was to climb to the Hump and then drop down to the Lower Icefall. They would then attempt the short climb to the top of the Lower Icefall to reach a plateau at the foot of the Upper Icefall. From there the Great Shelf – a snow shelf cutting across the Yalung Face from about 23,500 feet (7,200 m) in the southeast to 25,500 feet (7,800 m) in the northwest – should lead to a dark rock cirque, the "Sickle", beside a steep snow gangway leading to within striking distance of the summit. (Note: The Great Shelf, Gangway and Sickle can all be clearly seen from Darjeeling.) The rocks of the Sickle were the first outcrop to be reached after the Hump.

Locations of camps
Camp	Altitude		Date occupied (1955)	Description
Camp	feet	metres	Date occupied (1955)	Description
Base	18,100	5,500	23 April	at Pache's Grave
Camp 1	19,700	6,000	26 April	above the "narrows"
Camp 2	20,400	6,200	28 April	on the "Plateau" above Lower Icefall
Camp 3	21,800	6,600	4 May (Note: Established 9 May)	Advanced Base camp at the "Valley" below Upper Icefall
Camp 4	23,500	7,200	12 May	above Upper Icefall, level with and before Great Shelf
Camp 5	25,300	7,700	13 May	ledge below ice cliff at foot of "Sickle" and "Gangway".
Camp 6	26,900	8,200	24 May	small site dug out halfway up "Gangway"
Summit	28,168	8,586	25 May (Note: Second party summited 26 May 1955.)	stopped five feet below summit.

=== Lower and upper icefall ===
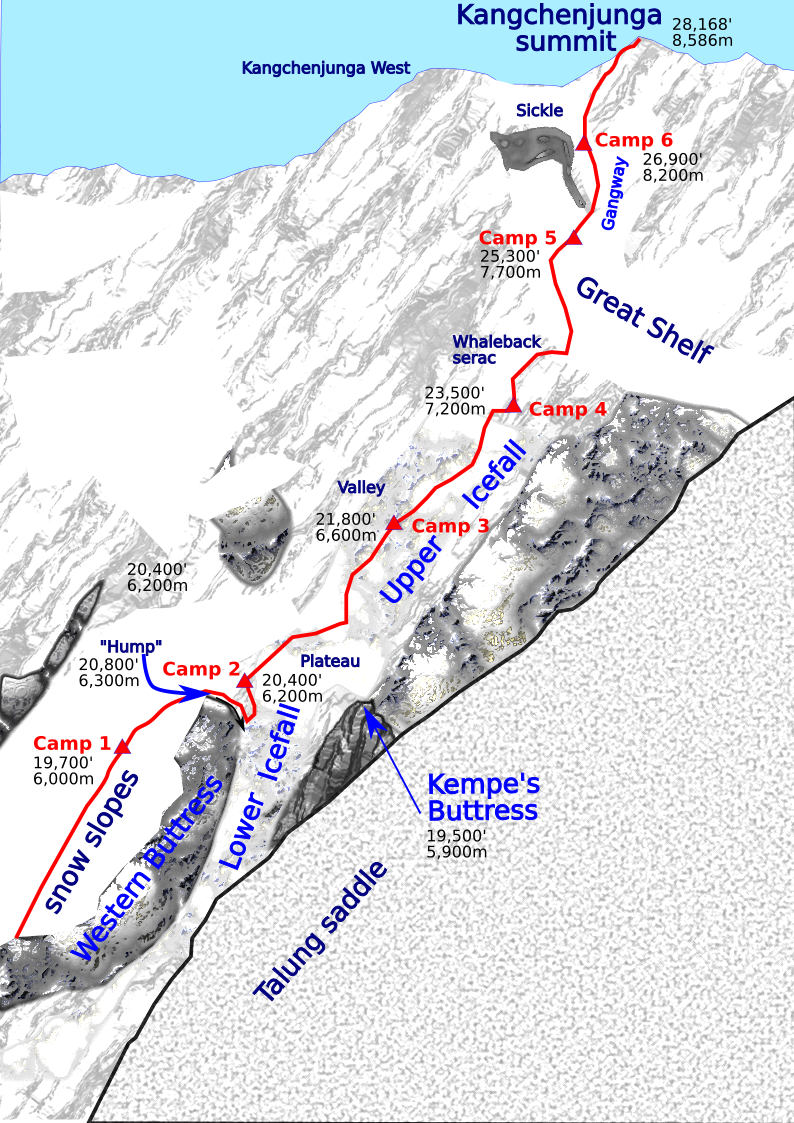
Route up Yalung Face

By 26 April Band and Hardie had pitched Camp 1 two-thirds of the way up the very steep snow slopes on the western side of the Western Buttress. To go higher involved crossing a crevasse 20 feet (6.1 m) wide which was eventually made suitable for Sherpas with a ladder and 200 feet (61 m) of ropes. Up to the Hump and down the ramp on the other side the slopes were about 40° and the descent to the icefall was a drop of some 400 feet (120 m). They struggled up the edge of the icefall to reach the spacious avalanche-free plateau (Note: The Plateau was about 0.5 miles (0.80 km) long and 0.25 miles (0.40 km) wide.) between the Upper and Lower Icefall. The Plateau was an excellent location for Camp 2 which was soon established by Evans and Brown. For three weeks without a single day being missed, supplies were ferried between Base Camp and Camp 2, stopping overnight at Camp 1 on the way up.

On 29 April Evans and Brown were close to the eventual site of Camp 3 but that night a storm hit. When they tried to descend to Camp 1 the depth of snow and the severe avalanches meant they had to go back to Camp 2 where there was a shortage of food. It was only on 4 May they could reach the site for Camp 3 – by 9 May it was fully equipped as Advance Base Camp at 21,800 feet (6,600 m) by teams of Sherpas and climbers ferrying up and down the mountain. On 12 May Evans and Hardie set up Camp 4 and next day they were able to attain the Great Shelf where there were good snow conditions and they went on to find a suitable location for Camp 5, sheltered by an ice cliff at 25,300 feet (7,700 m), the greatest height ever reached on the mountain.

=== Upper camps ===
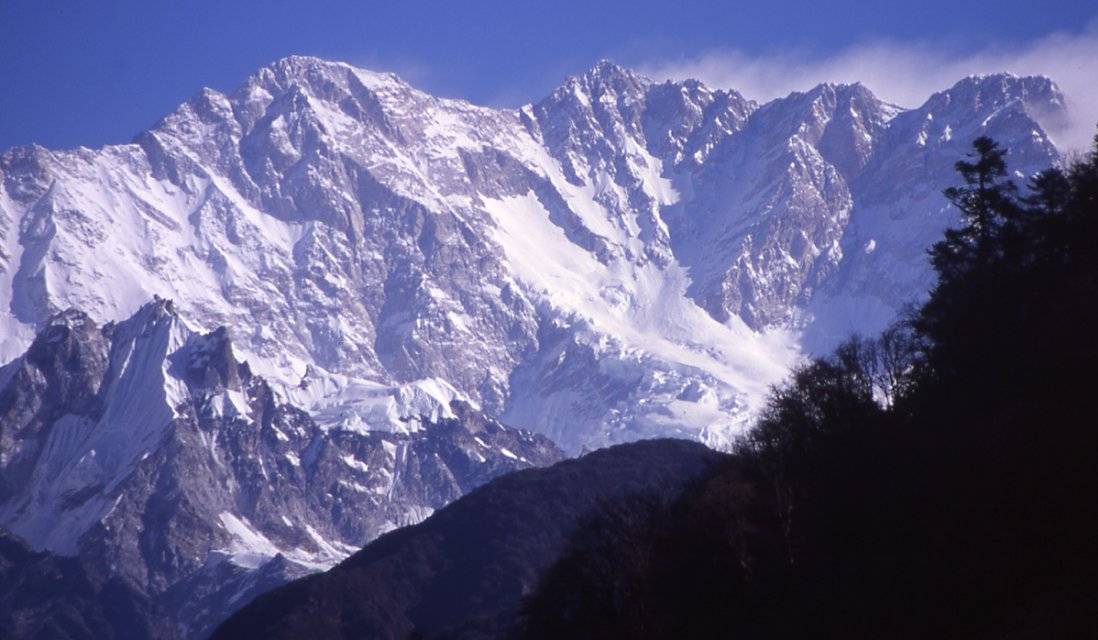
Yalung or Southwest Face of Kanchengjunga

Streather, Mather and their Sherpas started stocking Camp 4 while the rest of the climbers returned to recuperate at Base Camp. When there, Evans announced the detailed plans for the next few days – the reconnaissance had turned into a bid for the summit. Jackson, McKinnon and their Sherpas would stock Camp 5. Brown and Band, the first summit pair, supported by Evans, Mather and four Sherpas would follow a day later. The supporting climbers would establish Camp 6 as near to the top of the Gangway as possible. Hardie and Streather would be a second assault team, supported by two Sherpas and moving up a day later still.

Things did not get off to a good start. Streather became snowblind and was unable to get above Camp 4 and many of the supplies had to be dumped below Camp 5. Jackson and McKinnon were unable to descend to Camp 3 so had to stay at Camp 4 with Brown and Band. That night a blizzard developed and it seemed the monsoon might be imminent. However, Jackson and McKinnon were able to descend to Camp 3. On the third day the storm conditions abated so Evans, Mather, Brown, Band and three Sherpas set off for Camp 5 only to find an avalanche had swept away many of the supplies that had been dumped there. After a day of unscheduled rest at Camp 5 they then made good progress but when they reached a rocky outcrop at the planned height for Camp 6, 26,900 feet (8,200 m), there was nowhere at all suitable. They had to dig a ledge out of the 45° snow slope where, after two hours work, they created a ledge 4 feet 6 inches (1.37 m) wide for a tent 5 feet (1.5 m) wide. Despite the conditions they had an evening meal of asparagus soup, lambs' tongues and drinking chocolate. Band and Brown remained at Camp 6 for the night of 24 May, wearing all their clothes, including boots, inside their sleeping bags and using a low flow of supplemental oxygen.

=== Summit attempts ===
Kangchenjunga expedition videos
- Alpine ClubCast 9: A Kangchenjunga Special; Marking the 65th anniversary of the first ascent of Kangchenjunga. In particular an interview with Joe Brown (2m30s–11m30s)
- Extracts of 1955 expedition footage from BBC Television documentary (no sound) Background information in Horrell (2018).
- 2011 expedition taking same route as in 1955; Report of 2011 expedition by Gatta (2011).

==== 25 May 1955 – Brown and Band ====
At 05:00 a fine day beckoned and by 08:15 Brown and Band were ready to set off up the Gangway where they found very good snow conditions. Going to the top of the Gangway would have led to an awkward lengthy route along the west ridge to the summit so their plan was to veer to the right off the Gangway onto the southwest face and so reach the ridge quite close to the summit. A suitable line had been spotted from below but it was unclear where to actually turn off the Gangway. In the event they turned too soon and had to backtrack, so wasting 1½ hours. The next stage involved rock climbing and then there was a 60° snow slope. They could only afford to use a low rate of oxygen (two litres a minute each) and this seemed to sustain Brown better than Band so they stopped alternating the lead climbing and Brown stayed going first. After over five hours of continuous climbing they reached the ridge and the summit pyramid could be seen 400 feet (120 m) above.

They took a brief rest and a snack until 14:00 when they had two hours of oxygen left – they had to reach the summit by 15:00 to avoid an emergency bivouac on the way down. Brown led a final rock climb up a 20-foot (6 m) tall crack with a slight overhang at the top (grade about "very difficult" ignoring the altitude). This required oxygen at six litres a minute and the climb led to a stance from where, to their surprise, the actual summit was just 20 feet (6 m) away and five feet (1.5 m) higher up. It was 14:45 on 25 May 1955. Even though this was the first ascent of the mountain, as agreed they did not go up onto the summit itself. There was a layer of cloud at 20,000 feet (6,100 m) so they could only see the highest peaks – Makalu, (Note: Although the British team knew about the ongoing French expedition to Makalu, they did not know Makalu had been successfully climbed ten days earlier.) Lhotse and Everest, 80 miles (130 km) away to the west.

They started the descent, discarding their oxygen sets when they were empty after one hour. As it got dark they reached their tent to be greeted by Hardie and Streather who had arrived there to make a second attempt if the first had failed. Band and Brown thought it was too dangerous to continue straight down to Camp 5 so that night four men had to survive in the small two-man tent that jutted out over the edge of the narrow ledge cut into the steep slope. Brown was in great pain through the night suffering from snowblindness.

==== 26 May 1955 – Hardie and Streather ====
Next morning Hardie and Streather decided a second summit attempt was worthwhile so they set off along the same route but avoiding the previous pair's detour. At the rock wall immediately before the summit Brown and Band had left a sling hanging to help them climb but Hardie and Streather continued further around the base of the wall and found an easy snow slope up to just below the summit which they reached at 12:15. They spent an hour at the top before descending successfully. Hardie and Streather had carried 2400 litres of oxygen each compared to Band and Brown's 1600 litres but unfortunately a couple of mishaps led to about half of it leaking away and Streather ended up having to descend without supplementary oxygen. They stayed at Camp 6 overnight and next day continued down to Camp 5 to be met by Evans and Dawa Tensing who had been waiting there to support both pairs of climbers attempting the summit.

=== Departure ===
Pemi Dorje, one of the Sherpas and Dawa Tenzing's brother-in-law, died at base camp on 26 May. On 19 May he had fallen into a crevasse and become exhausted helping with the carry to Camp 5 and, although he got safely down to base camp and initially appeared to be recovering, he died. As the various parties started to come down the mountain snow and ice were rapidly melting leaving some snow bridges and ladders in an increasingly dangerous state. Evans decided to leave the mountain quickly, taking only equipment that could be readily carried and abandoning the rest. By 28 May the expedition had left the mountain.

On the initial march-in, to avoid high passes that might be snowbound, they had left the Singalila Ridge quite far south at Phulat to head down into the jungle of Nepal. On the return march in heavy rain they went up onto the ridge further north, after Ramser, and followed along the crest to avoid leeches infesting the valleys at the time of the monsoon. (Note: Crowley has a good deal to say about the leeches in this region.) On 13 June they were back at Darjeeling

== Assessment ==
A day after Norman Hardie and Tony Streather made the second ascent, a coded message was sent back to London announcing their success. The news made headlines around the world, but the expedition never made such an impact as previous ascents such as Everest or K2. In addition, none of the team received national honours at the time. Evans' and Band's publications did not encourage any of the usual nationalist feelings: their reports made no mention of flags placed on the summit.

In a 1956 American Alpine Journal editorial Francis Farquhar said:

The ascent of Kangchenjunga last year by the party led by Charles Evans deserves a good deal more acclaim than seems to have been accorded it. In several respects it was a greater mountaineering achievement than the ascent of Everest. Although not quite the highest mountain in the world, it is so close to it as to be definitely in the same pre-eminent class. But in sheer magnitude, in the vastness of its quadruple system of glaciers, in its enormous cliffs, and in its interminable ridges, it is unequalled on the earth's surface. Moreover, until Evans undertook to solve its problems last year, it seemed as if it might be the one great mountain in the world that could not be climbed.

Over fifty years later Doug Scott, who had climbed Mount Everest and Kangchenjunga, wrote it was:

... a remarkable climb and one of the finest achievements in the annals of British mountaineering. ... The first ascent of Everest was a remarkable achievement but what made the climbing of Kangchenjunga even more impressive was that on Everest only 900 ft of the ascent route remained unexplored since the Swiss had got so high the year before. On Kangchenjunga there was 9000 ft of untested ground to negotiate and this was found to be more technically difficult than on Everest, with most of the difficulties near the summit.

In 2005 Ed Douglas wrote for the British Mountaineering Council: "In 1955 British climbers made the first ascent of Kangchenjunga, a mountain with an even more formidable reputation than Everest. The nation may have forgotten a unique sporting achievement ...".

Right back in 1956 Evans was prescient when he wrote of the Sherpas he so much admired:

It would be naive to suppose that they can never change. Except those of the strongest character, it is unlikely that they can be proof against the great growth of Himalayan travel, and the penetration into the remotest places of caravans whose assumption is that it is money that matters. We are lucky to have enjoyed their friendship in days when they have not yet been much exposed to the chance of harm.

The next expedition to Kangchenjunga was not until 1973, a full eighteen years after the first ascent. A Japanese team attempted to reach the West summit but two died after reaching the summit.
