= Waraqu (Pasco) =

Mountain in Peru

- Location within Peru

Highest point
- Elevation: 4,800 m (15,700 ft)
- Coordinates: 10°35′06″S 75°55′26″W

Geography
- Location: Peru, Pasco Region
- Parent range: Andes

Waraqu (Quechua for cactus, Hispanicized spelling Barraco) is a mountain in the Waqurunchu mountain range in the Andes of Peru, about 4,800 m (15,748 ft) high. It is located in the Pasco Region, Pasco Province, Huachón District. It lies northeast of Ñat'iqucha and southeast of Waqurunchu and Yanaqucha.
