= Puka Uru =

Mountain in Peru

- Location within Peru

Highest point
- Elevation: 4,650 m (15,260 ft)
- Coordinates: 10°28′40″S 76°01′54″W

Geography
- Location: Peru, Pasco Region
- Parent range: Andes

Puka Uru (Quechua puka red, uru tick; spider, "red tick" or "red spider", Hispanicized names Pucaoro Grande or Pucuaro Grande) is a mountain in the Andes of Peru, about 4,650 m (15,260 ft) high. It is located in the Pasco Region, Pasco Province, Ticlacayan District. Puka Uru lies northwest Qiwllaqucha, one of the highest peaks of the Waqurunchu mountain range.
