= Mishiguaganan (mountain) =

Mountain in Peru

- Location within Peru

Highest point
- Elevation: 4,600 m (15,100 ft)
- Coordinates: 10°33′41″S 75°59′36″W

Geography
- Location: Peru, Pasco Region
- Parent range: Andes, Huaguruncho

Mishiguaganan (possibly from Ancash Quechua mishi cat, Quechua waqay crying, to cry, -na a suffix, "where the cat cries", -n a suffix) is a mountain in the Huaguruncho mountain range in the Andes of Peru, about 4,600 m (15,100 ft) high. It is located in the Pasco Region, Pasco Province, Ticlacayán District, southwest of Huaguruncho.
