= Tamboragra =

Mountain in Peru

- Location within Peru

Highest point
- Elevation: 4,996 m (16,391 ft)
- Coordinates: 10°30′54″S 75°54′26″W

Geography
- Location: Peru, Pasco Region
- Parent range: Andes, Huaguruncho

Tamboragra or Tambo Ragra (possibly from Quechua tampu inn, raqra fissure, crack, crevice, "tampu crack" or "tampu crevice") is a 4,996-metre-high (16,391 ft) mountain in the Huaguruncho mountain range in the Andes of Peru. It is located in the Pasco Region, Pasco Province, on the border of the districts of Huachón and Ticlacayan. Tamboragra lies west of Añilcocha and northeast of Huaguruncho.
