= Ñausacocha =

Mountain in Peru

- Location within Peru

Highest point
- Elevation: 5,152 m (16,903 ft)
- Coordinates: 10°28′49″S 75°56′33″W

Geography
- Location: Peru, Pasco Region
- Parent range: Andes, Huaguruncho

Ñausacocha (possibly from Quechua ñawsa blind, qucha lake, "blind lake") is a 5,152-metre-high (16,903 ft) mountain and a nearby lake of the same name in the Huaguruncho mountain range in the Andes of Peru. The mountain and the lake are located in the Pasco Region, Pasco Province, Ticlacayán District, north of Huaguruncho.

Lake Ñausacocha lies at the southwestern slope of the peak at 10°29′19″S 75°57′05″W.
