= 1905 Kanchenjunga expedition =

Failed attempt to climb the Kangchenjunga in 1905

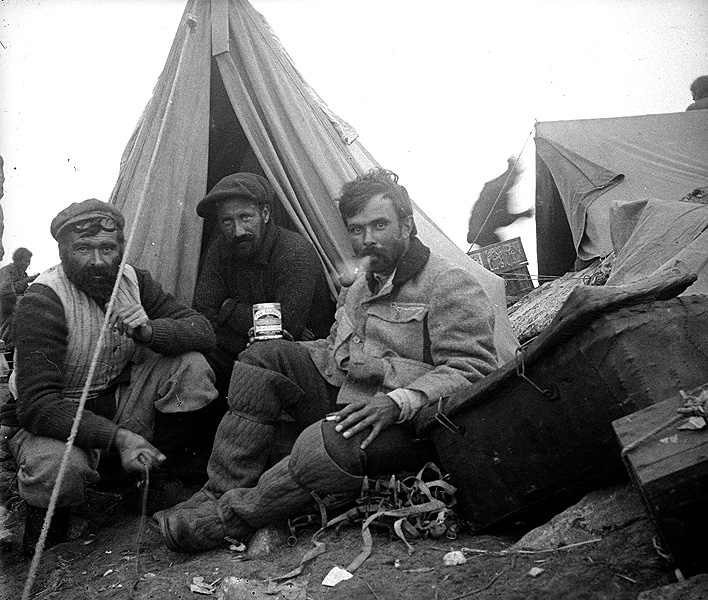
Jules Jacot-Guillarmod, Charles-Adolphe Reymond and Alcesti C. Rigo De Righi (from left to right) at the base camp of Kanchenjunga Expedition

The 1905 Kanchenjunga expedition was a Himalayan mountaineering expedition aimed to climb to the summit of the third-highest mountain in the world, Kangchenjunga, which would ultimately only be achieved in 1955.

The expedition was an idea of the Swiss doctor and photographer Jules Jacot-Guillarmod. In April 1905 he proposed his plans to the British occultist Aleister Crowley, with whom he had participated in Oscar Eckenstein's K2 expedition in 1902. Crowley agreed to join the expedition because as the climbing leader he would have the opportunity to break the altitude record. The record at the time was held by either William Woodman Graham, Emil Boss and Ulrich Kaufmann on Kabru (7,315 m), a widely contested, but possibly accurate claim, or Matthias Zurbriggen on Aconcagua (6,962 m).

Jacot-Guillarmod recruited two of his countrymen, Alexis Pache and Charles-Adolphe Reymond, while Crowley recruited his hotelkeeper in Darjeeling, the young Italian Alcesti C. Rigo de Righi, as transport officer. On July 31 the five left with three Kashmiri servants (who had been in the K2 expedition as well), and about 230 local porters. Armed with Douglas Freshfield's map of the range and Vittorio Sella's pictures, created during a circumnavigation of the massif in 1899, Crowley planned to climb the southwest face of Kanchenjunga over the Yalung Glacier. When Camp IV was made above this glacier, the team had fallen apart: Jacot-Guillarmod especially was shocked by Crowley's arrogant behavior and brutal treatment of the (barefooted) porters. Camp V was still made around 6,200 m, and on September 1, Crowley, Pache, Reymond and a group of porters made it to about 6,500 m before a small avalanche forced a nervous retreat. In his autobiography, Crowley claimed they reached about 25,000 feet or 7,620 m and claimed to have held the altitude record until the 1922 British Mount Everest expedition reached 8,320 m.

The next day Jacot-Guillarmod and De Righi attempted to depose Crowley from expedition leadership. The argument could not be settled, and Jacot-Guillarmod, De Righi, and Pache decided to retreat from Camp V to Camp III. At 5 pm they left with four porters on a single rope, but a fall precipitated an avalanche that killed three porters as well as Alexis Pache. People in Camp V heard "frantic cries" and Reymond immediately descended to help, but Crowley stayed in his tent. That evening he wrote a letter to a Darjeeling newspaper stating that he had advised against the descent and that "a mountain 'accident' of this sort is one of the things for which I have no sympathy whatever". The next day Crowley passed the site of the accident without pausing nor speaking to the survivors and left on his own to Darjeeling, where he took the expedition funds, which mostly had been paid by Jacot-Guillarmod. The latter would get at least some of his money back after threatening to make public some of Crowley's pornographic poetry.

The 1955 British Kangchenjunga expedition was the first to succeed in reaching the summit, starting off on the same route as pioneered in 1905.
