= Mike Westmacott =

British mountaineer (1925-2012)

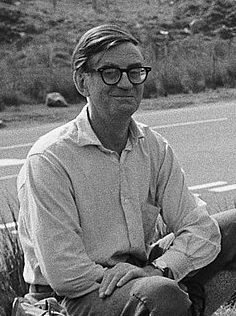
- Born: 12 April 1925; Babbacombe, Torquay, Devon
- Died: 20 June 2012 (aged 87); Grange-over-Sands, Cumbria
- Education: Corpus Christi College, Oxford
- Occupations: Statistician and economist
- Known for: member of the 1953 British Mount Everest Expedition

Michael Horatio Westmacott (12 April 1925 – 20 June 2012) was a British mountaineer who was a member of the team which made the first ascent of Mount Everest.

== Biography ==
Westmacott was born on 12 April 1925 at Coombe House, St George's Crescent in Babbacombe, Torquay, Devon. He was the oldest of three children of Horatio Westmacott, who served in the Royal Navy, and Irene Mary Juanita Gwennap Moore. His sisters were Monica Mary Westmacott and Catherine Penelope Westmacott.

Westmacott was educated at Radley College, Radley near Abingdon, Oxfordshire and Corpus Christi College, Oxford, where, after the war, he read mathematics.

During World War II he served as an officer with the British Indian Army Corps of Engineers in Burma. In Burma he was involved in building bridges with the King George V's Bengal Sappers and Miners with 150 Japanese PoWs under his command.

After the war Westmacott worked for some years as an agricultural statistician at Rothamsted Experimental Station. In 1957 he married Sally, Sarah Ellen Seddon. In the early 1960s he started working for Shell International as an economist and for a period from 1963 he was stationed in the US.

He retired in 1985 and moved to the Lake District. On 20 June 2012 he died in Grange-over-Sands, Cumbria.

== Mountaineering ==
Westmacott climbed extensively in the United Kingdom and the European Alps before becoming a member of the 1953 British Mount Everest Expedition which was led by John Hunt. While Edmund Hillary and Tenzing Norgay were making the first ascent of the 8,848 m (29,029 ft) Everest mountain in 1953, it was Westmacott and his team of Sherpas who kept open the expedition's vital line of supply and return.

In 1956 he joined John Kempe, George Band, John Streetly, John William Tucker and Dr Donald Stafford Matthews on an expedition to the Peruvian Andes. Streetly and Westmacott successfully made the first ascent of the 5,723 metres (18,776 ft) Huagaruncho on 17 August 1956.

Whilst based in the US he joined a small party in 1964 on the first successful rock climbing expedition to the Arrigetch Peaks of Alaska. Westmacott and his wife were members of the teams which made first ascents of several of the area's granite spires.

A small expedition to the Hindu Kush in 1968, with his wife, Trevor Braham, and Hugh Thomlinson, led to the first ascent of a 5,681 m (18,638 ft) peak near Wakhikah Rah in NE Chitral.

He became president of the Alpine Club (1993–1995) and was instrumental in establishing the Alpine Club's Himalayan Index. He was also elected president of the Climbers Club (1978–1980).
