= Hatun Ukru (Pasco) =

Mountain in Peru

- Location within Peru

Highest point
- Elevation: 4,650 m (15,260 ft)
- Coordinates: 10°28′22″S 76°03′56″W

Geography
- Location: Peru, Pasco Region
- Parent range: Andes

Hatun Ukru (Quechua hatun big, ukru hole, pit, hollow, "big hollow", Hispanicized and broken name Jatunucero) is a 4,650-metre-high (15,260 ft) mountain in the Andes of Peru. It is located in the Pasco Region, Pasco Province, Ticlacayan District, northwest of the Waqurunchu mountain range.
