= Huachón District =

Coordinates: 10.6388°S 75.9493°W

Huachón Wachun
- District
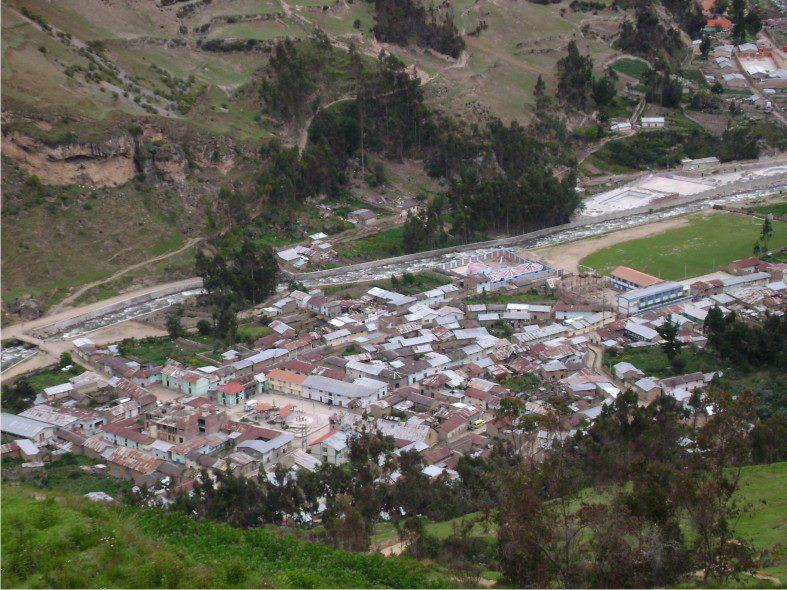
- Huachón
- Interactive map of Huachón
- Country: Peru
- Region: Pasco
- Province: Pasco
- Founded: December 27, 1923
- Capital: Huachón

Government
  - Mayor: Teodoro Urbano Duran Flores

Area
  - Total: 471.68 km^{2} (182.12 sq mi)
- Elevation: 3,400 m (11,200 ft)

Population (2005 census)
  - Total: 5,511
  - Density: 11.68/km^{2} (30.26/sq mi)
- Time zone: UTC-5 (PET)
- UBIGEO: 190102

Huachón District is one of thirteen districts of the Pasco Province in the Pasco Region of Peru. Its seat is Huachón.

== Geography ==
The Waqurunchu mountain range traverses the district. Some of the highest mountains of the district are listed below:

- Añilqucha
- Chuqimayu
- Millpu
- Ñat'iqucha
- Ñawsanqa
- Tampu Raqra
- Tinyaqucha
- Uskhu Raqra
- Waqurunchu
- Waraqu
- Yana Chaka
- Yana Chuku
- Yanaqucha
