= Alfred Gregory =

British mountaineer (1913–2010)

- Born: Alfred Gregory; 12 February 1913
- Died: 9 February 2010 (aged 96); Emerald, Victoria, Australia
- Occupations: Mountain climber, explorer, photographer
- Spouse: Sue Gregory

Alfred Gregory FBIPP, FRPS (Hon) (12 February 1913 – 9 February 2010) was a British mountaineer, explorer and professional photographer. A member of the 1953 British Mount Everest Expedition that made the first ascent of Mount Everest, he was in charge of stills photography and, as a climbing member of the team, reached 28,000 feet (8,500 metres) in support of the successful Hillary-Tenzing assault on the summit.

== Early life ==
The son of a grocer, Gregory was aged three when his father was killed in World War I. Gregory was educated at Blackpool Grammar School, Lancashire. Before World War II he climbed extensively in the Lake District of England, Scotland and the Alps, and during the 1940s he led several new routes in Britain. During the war he became a Major in the Black Watch, serving in North Africa and Italy. In 1952 he joined Eric Shipton’s Cho Oyu expedition.

During the 1950s he led several expeditions to the greater ranges. These included the 1955 Merseyside Himalayan Expedition to Rolwaling and the Gauri Sankar massif, where a plane table survey was made and 19 peaks were climbed, including Parchamo. Then to Distaghil Sar (1957), Ama Dablam (1958), the Karakoram and the Cordillera Blanca in Peru.

== Photography ==
For 20 years he worked freelance for Kodak UK, lecturing on photography and presenting his pictures to large audiences throughout Britain and Europe.

He spent a lifetime travelling on photographic assignments around the world and his pictures were regularly syndicated to 35 countries. Along with his wife Sue he produced many photojournalistic picture stories through the Tom Blau Camera Press News Agency in London. His work has been exhibited throughout Britain, France, Belgium, America, Africa, Poland and Australia.

In 2002 they held a joint exhibition at the 80 Gold Street Gallery, in Collingwood, Victoria, with photographs of 'Walls, Doors and Windows'.

== Death ==
Gregory died "peacefully in his sleep" on 9 February 2010 in Emerald, Victoria, where he spent the last 15 years of his life with wife Suzanne. He was three days shy of his 97th birthday.

== Publications ==
- The Picture of Everest (1953)
- Alfred Gregory's Everest (published for the 40th anniversary of the first ascent)
- Blackpool: a Celebration of the 60s
- Alfred Gregory: Photographs from Everest to Africa
