= Yana Chuku (Pasco) =

Mountain in Peru

- Location within Peru

Highest point
- Elevation: 4,996 m (16,391 ft)
- Coordinates: 10°27′12″S 75°53′27″W

Geography
- Location: Peru, Pasco Region
- Parent range: Andes

Yana Chuku (Quechua yana black, chuku hat, "black hat", also named Yanachuco Grande) is a mountain and a ridge in the Andes of Peru. Its highest peak is located in the Pasco Region, Pasco Province, on the border of the districts of Huachón and Ticlacayan. The ridge extends to the northeast along the Ranra Kancha and Yana K'uchu valleys.
