= Ticlacayán District =

Coordinates: 10.5348°S 76.1635°W

Ticlacayán
- District
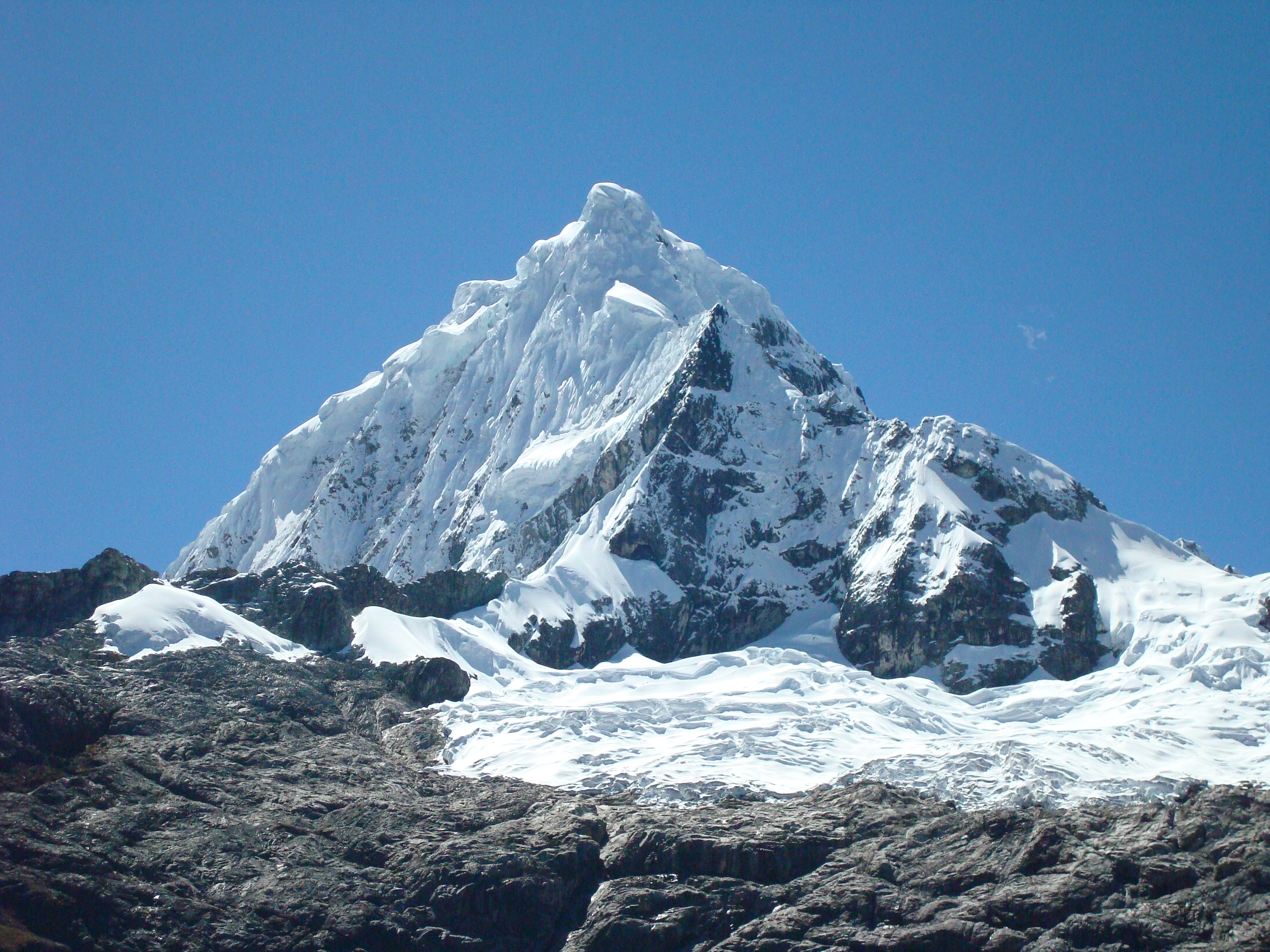
- Waqurunchu
- Interactive map of Ticlacayán
- Country: Peru
- Region: Pasco
- Province: Pasco
- Founded: June 14, 1958
- Capital: Ticlacayán

Government
  - Mayor: Ronald David Meza Diaz

Area
  - Total: 585.1 km^{2} (225.9 sq mi)
- Elevation: 3,500 m (11,500 ft)

Population (2005 census)
  - Total: 4,309
  - Density: 7.365/km^{2} (19.07/sq mi)
- Time zone: UTC-5 (PET)
- UBIGEO: 190110

Ticlacayán District is one of thirteen districts of the Pasco Province in the Pasco Region of Peru. Its seat is Ticlacayán.

== Geography ==
The Waqurunchu mountain range traverses the district. One of the highest mountains of the district is Waqurunchu at 5,748 m (18,858 ft). Other mountains are listed below:

- Anka Wachanan
- Awki
- Hatun Ukru
- Kasha Pata
- Llama Lluchka
- Luychu
- Manka P'ukru
- Marayniyuq
- Mina Kasha
- Mishi Waqanan
- Muruqucha
- Ñawsan
- Ñawsaqucha
- Parya Punta
- Puka Uru
- Puma Hirka
- Puma Wayin
- Qaqa Mach'ay
- Qiwllaqucha
- Ranra Tampu
- Raqray
- Saqra Mach'ay
- Shaywa Punta
- Tampu Raqra
- T'uru Hirka
- Wachwa Rumi
- Wank'a Wank'a
- Waqay Rumi
- Waqurunchu (Huá.-Pas.)
- Yana Chuku
- Yanaqucha
- Yuraq Mit'u
