= Kanchha Sherpa =

Nepali mountaineer (1932–2025)

- Ang Phurba
- Born: 1932; Namche Bazaar, Solukhumbu District, Nepal
- Died: 16 October 2025 (aged 92); Kathmandu, Nepal
- Other name: Ang Phurba
- Occupations: Mountaineer, porter, lodge owner
- Known for: Last surviving member of the 1953 British Mount Everest Expedition
- Spouse: Ang Lhakpa Sherpa
- Children: 6
- Relatives: Tenzing Chogyal Sherpa (grandson)

Kanchha Sherpa (born Ang Phurba and also spelled Kancha Sherpa; 1932 – 16 October 2025) was a Nepali mountaineer and high-altitude porter, best known as the last surviving member of the 1953 British Mount Everest Expedition, which achieved the first successful ascent of the world's highest peak. He was among the Sherpas who supported Sir Edmund Hillary and Tenzing Norgay during their historic climb.

== Early life ==
Kanchha Sherpa was born in 1932 in Namche Bazaar, a Sherpa village in the Solukhumbu District of Nepal. His family originated from Thame, and his father worked as a porter on trade routes between Solukhumbu and Tibet. His birth name was Ang Phurba, but his mother had always called him ‘Kanchha’.

As a teenager, Kanchha went to Darjeeling, India, in search of work. There he met Tenzing Norgay, who recognised him as the son of a fellow mountaineer from an earlier expedition. Norgay helped him join the 1953 British Mount Everest Expedition as one of the 103 Sherpas employed by the team, earning five rupees a day.

== 1953 British Mount Everest Expedition ==
At the age of 19, Kanchha Sherpa joined the 1953 British Mount Everest Expedition led by John Hunt, as one of the 103 Sherpas employed by the team, earning five rupees a day. The expedition successfully placed Sir Edmund Hillary and Tenzing Norgay on the summit on 29 May 1953.

Although he did not reach the summit, Kanchha played a role in carrying supplies up to the South Col, reaching altitudes above 8,000 metres (26,000 ft). He was one of only three Sherpas to make it to the expedition’s highest camps.

In later interviews, Kanchha recalled helping the team build a wooden bridge across a large crevasse in the Khumbu Icefall, using pine logs cut and carried from Namche Bazaar.

== Later life and death ==
Following the 1953 expedition, Kanchha continued working as a high-altitude porter for the next two decades, retiring in 1973 at his wife’s request due to the risks involved. He later ran a trekking lodge, Nirvana Home, in Namche Bazaar, where he shared stories of the first ascent with visiting trekkers.

In his later years, he became an advocate for Sherpa welfare and environmental conservation in the Everest region. He founded the Kanchha Sherpa Foundation, which promoted education and preserved Sherpa cultural traditions.

Kanchha was featured in documentaries, including Kancha Sherpa (2019), produced by BPC Sweden, which chronicled his life and spiritual outlook. His autobiography, Tough and Cheerful, was published in 2022.

Kanchha Sherpa died at his home in Kapan, Kathmandu, on 16 October 2025, aged 92. According to family members, he had been suffering from throat problems in his final months. His death was widely mourned across Nepal’s mountaineering community. The Nepal Mountaineering Association described him as “a legend and an inspiration” and called for state recognition of his contributions. He was survived by his wife, Ang Lhakpa Sherpa, four sons, two daughters, eight grandchildren, and one great-granddaughter.

== See also ==
- 1953 British Mount Everest expedition
- Tenzing Norgay
- Sir Edmund Hillary
- Sherpa people
