= Naticocha =

Mountain in Peru

- Location within Peru

Highest point
- Elevation: 4,610 m (15,120 ft)
- Coordinates: 10°35′35″S 75°57′39″W

Geography
- Location: Peru, Pasco Region
- Parent range: Andes, Huaguruncho

Naticocha (possibly from Quechua ñat'i, nati sickness; bowels; the most hidden, qucha lake) is a 4,610-metre-high (15,125 ft) mountain in the Andes of Peru. It is located in the Pasco Region, Pasco Province, Huachón District, southwest of Yanacocha.
