= 1953 British Mount Everest expedition =

First successful ascent of Mount Everest

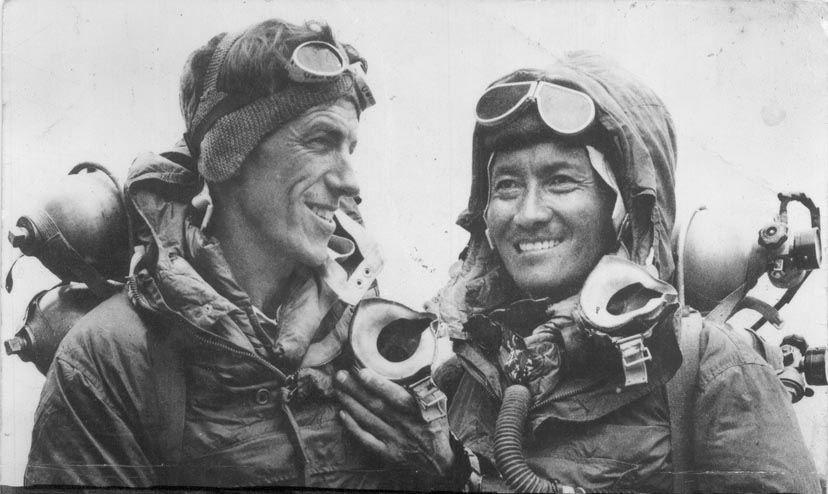
Edmund Hillary and Tenzing Norgay in 1953

The 1953 British Mount Everest expedition was the ninth mountaineering expedition to attempt the first ascent of Mount Everest, and the first confirmed to have succeeded when Tenzing Norgay and Edmund Hillary reached the summit on 29 May 1953 at 11:30 a.m. Led by Colonel John Hunt, it was organised and financed by the Joint Himalayan Committee. News of the expedition's success reached London in time to be released on the morning of Queen Elizabeth II's coronation, on 2 June that year.

== Background ==
Identified as the highest mountain in the world during the 1850s, Everest became a subject of interest during the Golden Age of Alpinism, although its height made it questionable if it could ever be climbed. In 1885, Clinton Thomas Dent's Above the Snow Line suggested that an ascent might be possible. Practical considerations (and World War I) prevented significant approaches until the 1920s. George Mallory is quoted as having said he wanted to climb Everest "Because it's there", a phrase that has been called "the most famous three words in mountaineering". Mallory famously disappeared on Everest during the 1924 British Mount Everest expedition and the location of his body remained a mystery for 75 years.

Most early attempts on Everest were made from the north (Tibetan) side, but the Chinese Communist Revolution, and the subsequent annexation of Tibet by the People's Republic of China led to the closure of that route. Climbers began to look at an approach from the Nepalese side. The 1952 Swiss Mount Everest Expedition, climbing from Nepal, reached an elevation of about 8,595 m (28,199 ft) on the southeast ridge, setting a new climbing altitude record.

=== Leadership, preparations and training ===
John Hunt, a British Army Colonel, while with the BAOR, was serving on the staff at Supreme Headquarters Allied Powers Europe when to his surprise he was invited by the Joint Himalayan Committee of the Alpine Club and the Royal Geographical Society to lead the British Everest expedition of 1953. Eric Shipton had been widely expected to be the leader, because he had led the Mount Everest reconnaissance expedition from Nepal in 1951, as well as the unsuccessful Cho Oyu expedition in 1952, from which expedition most of the climbers selected had been drawn. However, the committee had decided that Hunt's experience of military leadership, together with his credentials as a climber, would provide the best chance for expedition to succeed. The British felt under particular pressure, as the French had received permission to mount a similar expedition in 1954, and the Swiss another in 1955, meaning that the British would not have another chance at Everest until 1956 or later. As Shipton wrote of his position presented to the committee on 28 July 1952: "My well-known dislike of large expeditions and my abhorrence of a competitive element in mountaineering might well seem out of place in the present situation." This statement, according to George Band, "sealed his own fate".

Several members of the British expedition had a strong loyalty to Shipton and were unhappy that he had been replaced. Charles Evans, for instance, stated, "It was said that Shipton lacked the killer instinct – not a bad thing to lack in my view." Edmund Hillary was among those most opposed to the change, but he was won over by Hunt's personality and by his admission that the change had been badly handled. George Band recalls Committee member Larry Kirwan, the Director-Secretary of the Royal Geographical Society, saying that "they had made the right decision but in the worst possible way".

Hunt later wrote that the Joint Himalayan Committee had found the task of raising funds for the expedition challenging:

One of the principal tasks of the Joint Himalayan Committee in addition to those of conceiving the idea of an Everest expedition, seeking political sanction, deciding matters of policy in preparation, is to finance it. Only those who have had this care can fully appreciate the work and anxiety of raising very substantial funds for an enterprise of this nature, coloured as it inevitably is in the mind of the public by a succession of failures, with no financial security other than the pockets of the Committee members themselves.

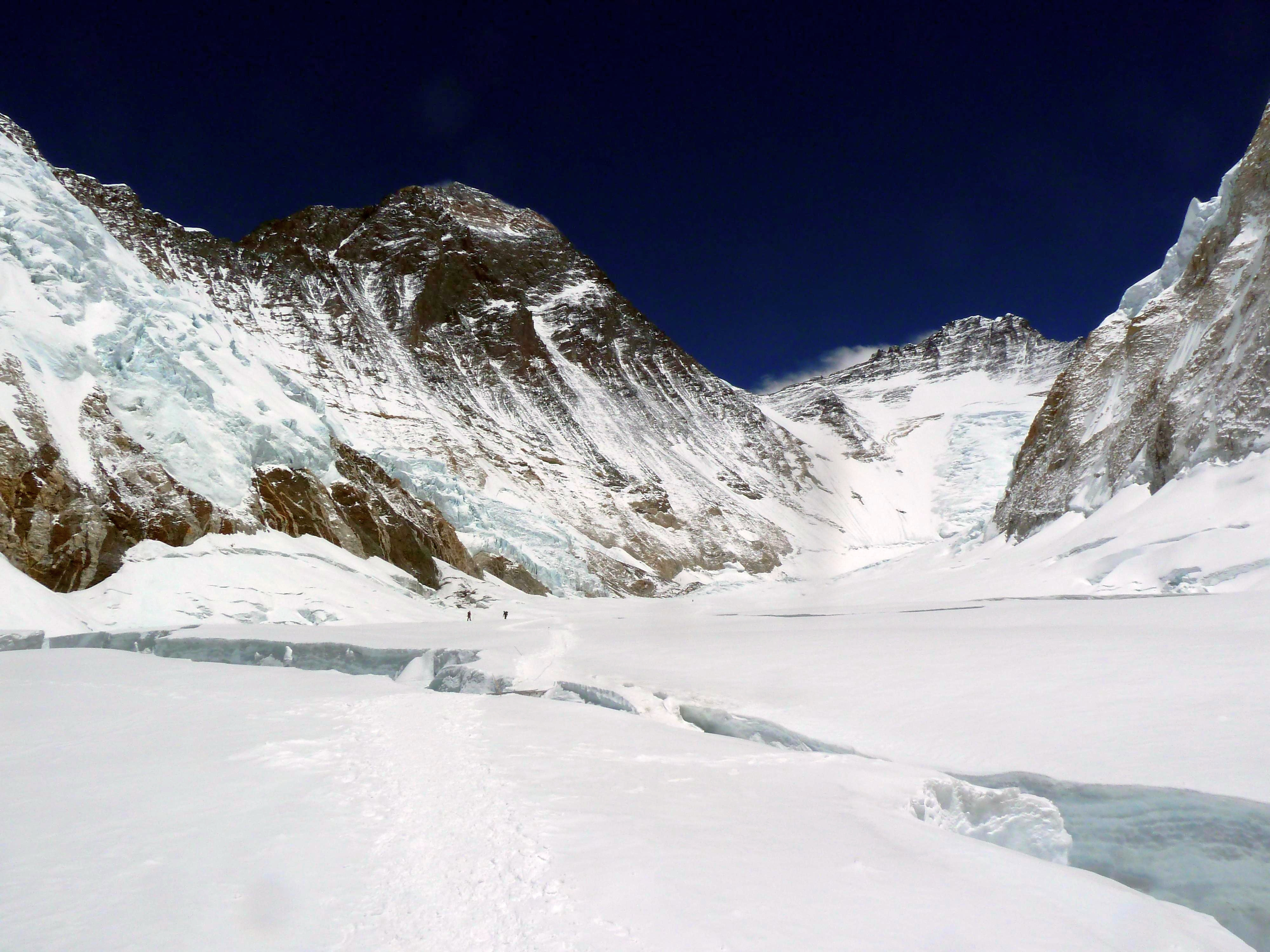
The Western Cwm, above the Khumbu Icefall. The Lhotse Face (centre right) was climbed trending left to the South Col (depression, centre), with the south-east ridge leading to Mount Everest's summit

Initial training took place in Snowdonia in Wales during the winter. The Pen-y-Gwryd hotel was used as a base camp, and the team furthered their mountaineering skills on the slopes of Snowdon and the Glyderau. Testing of the oxygen equipment took place at the Climbers Club Hut at Helyg near Capel Curig.

The party departed for Nepal from Tilbury, Essex, England aboard the S.S. Stratheden bound for Bombay on 12 February, bar Tom Bourdillon, Griffith Pugh, and Hunt, who required surgery to resolve an infection of the "antrum" (Hunt's account does not specify, but this was possibly the mastoid antrum of the temporal bone, or the maxillary antrum of the sinus). Evans and Alfred Gregory had flown on ahead to Kathmandu on 20 February, as the Advance Party. Hillary and George Lowe approached Nepal from New Zealand, Lowe by sea and Hillary by air, as his "bees were in a busy state at that time of year". Although a sea passage was cheaper, Hunt stated that the main reason for choosing it over an air journey was "the further chance which life in a ship would provide for us to settle down as a team in ideal conditions, accompanied by no discomfort, urgency or stress".

In Kathmandu, the party was looked after by the British ambassador, Christopher Summerhayes, who arranged rooms with embassy staff, there being no hotels in Kathmandu at the time. In early March twenty Sherpas, who had been chosen by the Himalayan Club, arrived in Kathmandu to help carry loads to the Western Cwm and the South Col. They were led by their Sirdar, Tenzing Norgay, who was attempting Everest for the sixth time and was, according to Band, "the best-known Sherpa climber and a mountaineer of world standing". Although Tenzing was offered a bed in the embassy, the remaining Sherpas were expected to sleep on the floor of the embassy garage; they urinated in front of the embassy the following day in protest at the lack of respect they had been shown.

== Expedition ==
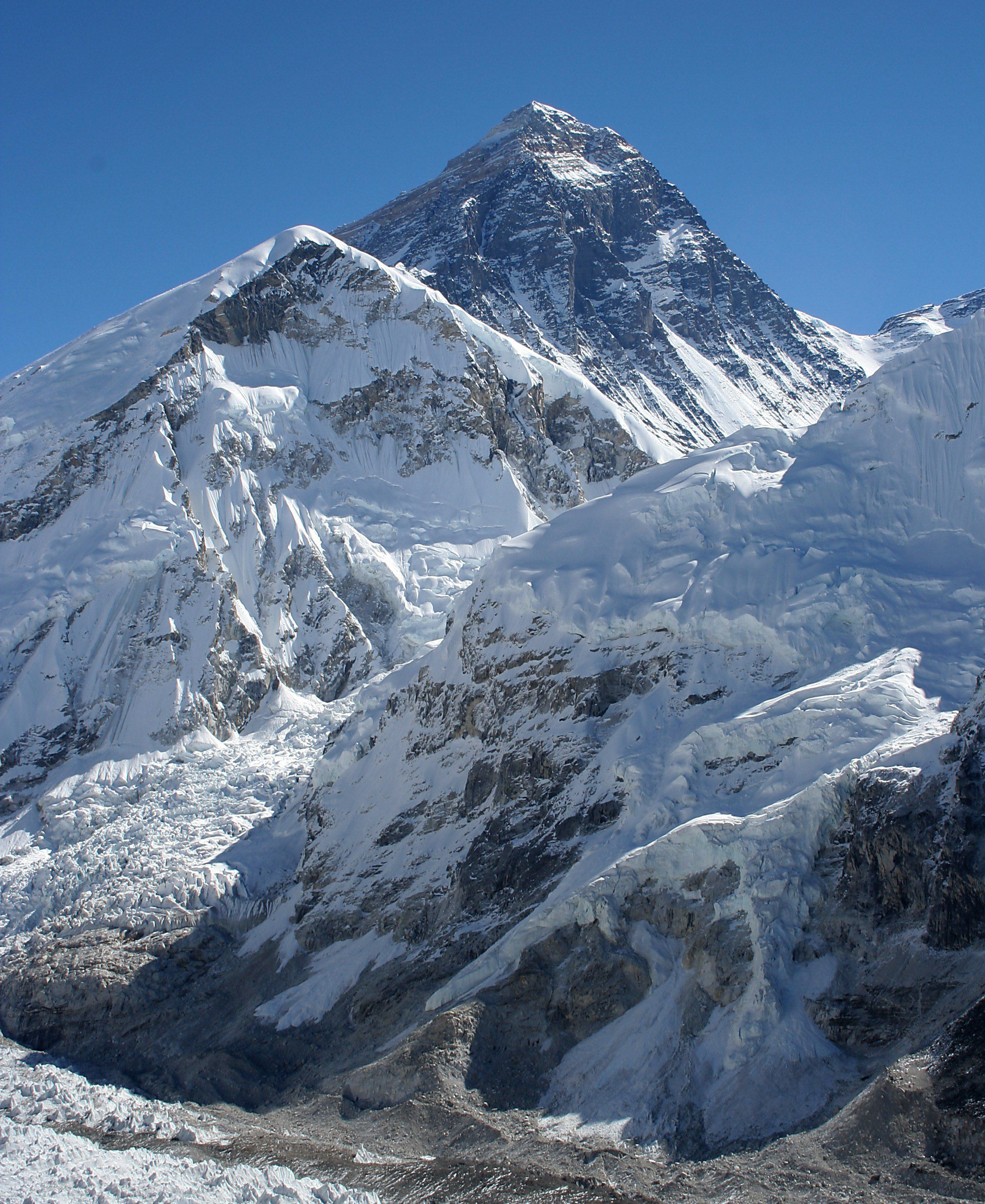
Mount Everest. The route the British took started up the Khumbu Icefall − seen spilling out of the Western Cwm (hidden from view) − Lhotse Face and reached the South Col (snowy depression, extreme right), finishing up the south-east ridge (right-hand skyline)

The first party, together with 150 porters, left Kathmandu for Mount Everest on 10 March, followed by the second party and 200 porters on 11 March. They reached Thyangboche on 26 and 27 March respectively, and between 26 March and 17 April engaged in altitude acclimation.

Hunt planned for three assaults of two climbers each including "a third and last attempt" if necessary; although after two consecutive assaults, a wait for some days would be necessary to "recover our strength" and to replenish the camps. The plan for the first two assaults had been announced by Hunt on 7 May. The first assault party using closed-circuit oxygen equipment was to start from Camp VIII and aim to reach the South Summit (and if possible the Summit), composed of Tom Bourdillon and Charles Evans as only Bourdillon could cope with the experimental sets. The second assault party using open-circuit oxygen equipment was to be the strongest climbing pair, Ed Hillary and Tenzing Norgay; to start from Camp IX higher on the South Col. The third assault party would have been Wilf Noyce and Mike Ward.

If the (spring) expedition failed a post-monsoon autumn attempt would be undertaken (as the Swiss had done in 1952 – permission was for the whole year; although the Swiss arrived too late).

=== Base camp ===
The "Icefall party" reached Base Camp at 17,900 ft (5455 m) on 12 April 1953. A few days were then taken up, as planned, in establishing a route through the Khumbu Icefall, and once this had been opened teams of Sherpas moved tonnes of supplies up to Base.

=== Assault on the summit ===
A series of advanced camps were created, slowly reaching higher up the mountain. Camp II at 19,400 feet (5,900 m) was established by Hillary, Band and Lowe on 15 April, Camp III at the head of the Icefall at 20,200 feet (6,200 m) on 22 April, and Camp IV the Advance Base at 21,000 feet (6,400 m) by Hunt, Bourdillon and Evans on 1 May. These three made a preliminary reconnaissance of the Lhotse Face on 2 May, and Camp V at 22,000 feet (6,700 m) was established on 3 May. On 4 May, Bourdillon and Evans, supported by Ward and Wylie, reached Camp VI at 23,000 feet (7,000 m) on the Lhotse Face, and just under a fortnight later on 17 May, Wilfrid Noyce and Lowe established Camp VII at 24,000 feet (7,300 m). By 21 May, Noyce and the Sherpa Annullu (the younger brother of Da Tenzing) had reached the South Col, just under 26,000 feet (7,900 m).

Mount Everest and surrounding terrain

The first of two climbing pairs previously selected by Hunt, Tom Bourdillon and Charles Evans, set out for the summit on 26 May. They successfully made the first ascent of the 8,750 m (28,700 ft) South Summit at 1 pm, coming within 100 m (300 ft) of the final summit. They could see that between the South Summit and the Summit was a thin crest of snow and ice on rock, with a rock step (the Hillary Step). Before starting, Evans had a problem with a damaged valve in his oxygen set which took over an hour to fix; then they climbed at the unprecedented rate of almost 1,000 feet (300 m) per hour. At 28,000 feet (8,500 m), when they changed soda lime canisters, Evans' set had another problem which Bourdillon could not fix; Evans kept going but his breathing was painfully laboured. They reached the South Summit at 1 pm (at that time the highest summit climbed), but were forced to turn back at 1.20 pm after becoming exhausted, defeated by problems with the closed-circuit oxygen sets and lack of time.

Union Jack flag hoisted on summit during 1953 expedition.

On 27 May, the expedition made its second assault on the summit with the second climbing pair, the New Zealander Edmund Hillary and Sherpa Tenzing Norgay from Nepal. Norgay had previously ascended to a record high point on Everest as a member of the Swiss expedition of 1952. They left Camp IX at 6.30 am, reached the South Summit at 9 am, and reached the summit at 11:30 am on 29 May 1953, climbing the South Col route. Before descending, they remained at the summit long enough to take photographs and to bury some sweets and a small cross in the snow. They were not using open-circuit oxygen sets; after ten minutes taking photographs on the summit without his oxygen set on, Hillary said he "was becoming rather clumsy-fingered and slow-moving" because of not using bottled oxygen. On returning from the summit, Hillary's first words to George Lowe were "Well, George, we knocked the bastard off". Stobart got the descending party to give no indication to those like Hunt and Westmacott, waiting in agony and suspense at Advance Base (Camp IV), that Hillary and Tenzing had succeeded until they were close enough for Stobart to catch the emotion of the moment on film.

=== News event ===
Jan Morris, the correspondent on the spot of The Times newspaper, heard the news at Base Camp on 30 May and sent a coded message by runner to Namche Bazaar, where a wireless transmitter was used to forward it as a telegram to the British Embassy in Kathmandu. Morris' encoded message to her paper read: "Snow conditions bad stop advanced base abandoned yesterday stop awaiting improvement". "Snow conditions bad" was the agreed code to signify that the summit had been reached; "advance base abandoned" referred to Hillary and "awaiting improvement" referred to Tenzing. (Note: For other summiters the phrases were "Ridge camp untenable" (Evans) and "assault postponed" (Westmacott). And "wind still troublesome" meant "attempt failed". The plan for the first two assaults had been announced by Hunt on 7 May. The message was initially interpreted at the embassy to mean that Bourdillion and Tenzing had reached the summit, but this was corrected before release. Another source said that the message included the actual date uncoded: "... abandoned May 29 stop...". Morris had a simple code (on codecards) so that names and key events could be disguised in messages sent to Kathmandu even though it was impracticable to encode the whole message. The summit was "Golliwog", John Hunt was "Kettle" or "Stringbag" and Wilfrid Noyce was "Radiator" or "Windowsill". Three thousand feet was "Waistcoat Crossword Amsterdam." Messages were sent to Arthur Hutchison, the Times correspondent at Katmandu by runner "in the true cleft-stick tradition" and forwarded via the British Embassy. But Morris did not want the message of success to leak out, or to give obviously encoded messages to Mr Tiwari of the Indian Government wireless station at Namche, who had been asked to assist the expedition by handling urgent messages. So she developed a simple code (though it could only be used once or twice) to send enciphered but apparently sensible messages; they "would make perfect sense, but it would be the wrong sense". She kept two copies, and sent one by runner to Hutchison at Katmandu. The code, to tell London of success and to name the successful assault party members was: Message to begin: Snow Conditions Bad; Band: South Col Untenable; Bourdillon: Lhoste Face Impossible; Evans: Ridge Camp Untenable; Gregory: Withdrawal to West Basin; Hillary: Advanced Base Abandoned; Hunt: Camp Five Abandoned; Lowe: Camp Six Abandoned; Noyce: Camp Seven Abandoned; Tenzing: Awaiting Improvement; Ward: Further News Follows; Westmacott: Assault Postponed; Wylie: Weather Deteriorating; Sherpa: Awaiting Oxygen Supplies; All else – Genuine (possibly the date of success was sent "uncoded"); So after receiving the news of success Morris typed a message before she went to sleep that night: "Snow conditions bad stop advanced base abandoned yesterday stop awaiting improvement" and added to the bottom "All well". Which being interpreted meant: "Summit of Everest reached on May 29 by Hillary and Tenzing" John Hunt at Base Camp had lost hope that news of the successful ascent would reach London for the Coronation, and they listened with "growing excitement and amazement" when it was announced on All India Radio (from London) on the evening of 2 June, the day of the Coronation. At 2 pm on 1 June, the Indian Wireless News bulletin had announced that the expedition had failed.)

The message was received and understood in London in time for the news to be released, by coincidence, on the morning of Queen Elizabeth II's coronation on 2 June. The conquest of Everest was perhaps the last major news item to be delivered to the world by runner. (Note: The expedition did not have a transmitting set because of the extra weight and also "because it would have required a wireless officer to be added to our already large party"; though there were short-wave receivers for news and weather forecasts etc and eight VHF "walkie-talkies" for use between camps (unlike a transmitting set, they could be powered by dry batteries).)

== Aftermath ==
Returning to Kathmandu a few days later, the expedition learned that Hillary had already been appointed a Knight Commander of the Order of British Empire and Hunt a Knight Bachelor for their efforts. On 22 June, the Government of Nepal gave a reception for the members of the expedition at which the senior queen of the country presented Tenzing with a purse of ten thousand rupees, which was then about £500. Hillary and Hunt were given kukris in jewelled sheaths, while the other members received jewelled caskets. The same day, the Indian government announced the creation of a new gold medal, an award for civilian gallantry modelled on the George Medal, of which Hunt, Hillary and Tenzing would be the first recipients. On 7 June it was announced that Queen Elizabeth II wished to recognise the achievement of Tenzing, and on 1 July, 10 Downing Street announced that following consultation with the governments of India and Nepal the Queen had approved the award of the George Medal to him. Some commentators have seen this lesser honour as a reflection of the "petty bigotry" that men such as Norgay experienced during this period, although many other Indians and Nepalis had previously received knighthoods and it has been suggested that the Indian prime minister, Jawaharlal Nehru, refused permission for Norgay to be knighted. Hunt received his knighthood in July 1953, on his return to London.

Further honours continued to descend on the members of the expedition: the Hubbard Medal of the National Geographic Society, which had never before been awarded on a team basis, although individual medals were struck in bronze for Hunt, Hillary and Tenzing; the Cullum Geographical Medal of the American Geographical Society, the Founder's Medal of the Royal Geographical Society; the Lawrence Medal of the Royal Central Asian Society; and honorary degrees from the universities of Aberdeen, Durham, and London. In the New Year Honours list of 1954, George Lowe was appointed a Commander of the Order of the British Empire for his membership of the expedition; the 37 team members also received the Queen Elizabeth II Coronation Medal with MOUNT EVEREST EXPEDITION engraved on the rim.

The expedition's cameraman, Tom Stobart, produced a film called The Conquest of Everest, which appeared later in 1953 and was nominated for an Academy Award for Best Documentary Feature.

Although Hillary and Tenzing represented their triumph as belonging to a team effort by the whole of the expedition, there was intense speculation as to which of the two men had actually been first to set foot on the summit of Everest. In Kathmandu, a large banner depicted Tenzing pulling a "semi-conscious" Hillary to the summit. Tenzing eventually ended the speculation by revealing in his 1955 (ghost-written) autobiography Man of Everest that Hillary was first. After this Hillary himself wrote that following his ascent of the 40-foot Hillary Step, lying just below the summit:

I continued on, cutting steadily and surmounting bump after bump and cornice after cornice looking eagerly for the summit. It seemed impossible to pick it and time was running out. Finally I cut around the back of an extra large lump and then on a tight rope from Tenzing I climbed up a gentle snow ridge to its top. Immediately it was obvious that we had reached our objective. It was 11.30 a.m. and we were on top of Everest!

Shipton commented on the successful ascent: "Thank goodness. Now we can get on with some proper climbing."

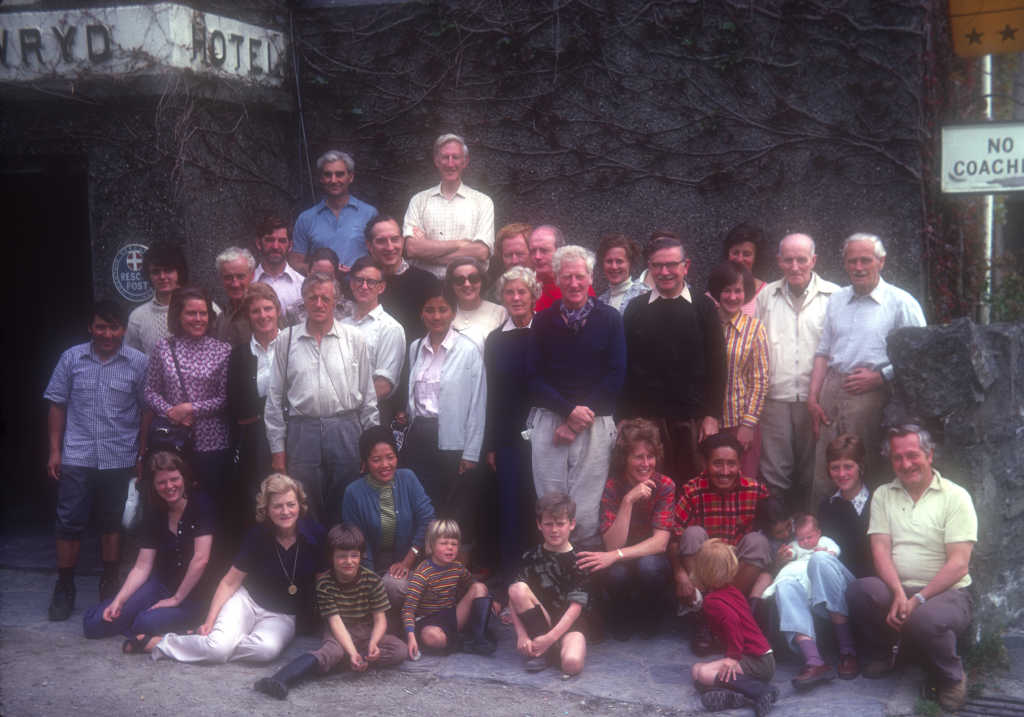
Everest reunion of 1963. Team members with family and notable guests at Pen-y-Gwryd hotel. Sherpa Tenzing wears a red tartan shirt.

== Expedition participants ==
The expedition participants were selected for their mountaineering qualifications and also for their expertise in providing a number of other necessary skills and support services. While most were from the United Kingdom itself, they were also drawn from other countries of the British Empire and Commonwealth of Nations. The leader, Hunt, had been born in India.

Name	Function	Profession	Age at time of selection (1 November 1952)
(United Kingdom) John Hunt	Expedition leader and mountaineer	British Army Colonel	42
(United Kingdom) Charles Evans	Deputy expedition leader and mountaineer	Physician	33
(United Kingdom) George Band	Mountaineer	Graduate in geology	23
(United Kingdom) Tom Bourdillon	Mountaineer	Physicist	28
(United Kingdom) Alfred Gregory	Mountaineer	Director of travel agency	39
(United Kingdom) Wilfrid Noyce	Mountaineer	Schoolmaster and author	34
(United Kingdom) Griffith Pugh	Doctor and mountaineer	Physiologist	43
(United Kingdom) Tom Stobart	Cameraman and mountaineer	Cameraman	38
(United Kingdom) Michael Ward	Expedition doctor and mountaineer	Physician	27
(United Kingdom) Michael Westmacott	Mountaineer	Statistician	27
(United Kingdom) Charles Wylie	Organizing secretary and mountaineer	Soldier	32
(New Zealand) Edmund Hillary	Mountaineer	Apiarist	33
(New Zealand) George Lowe	Mountaineer	Schoolmaster	28
(Nepal) (India) Tenzing Norgay	Mountaineer and guide		38
(Nepal) Sherpa Annullu	Mountaineer and guide		

The mountaineers were accompanied by Jan Morris, the correspondent of The Times newspaper of London, and by 362 porters, so that the expedition in the end amounted to over four hundred men, including twenty Sherpa guides from Tibet and Nepal, with a total weight of ten thousand pounds of baggage. Kanchha Sherpa, the last surviving member of this expedition team, died in October 2025 at the age of 92.

== See also ==
- Timeline of climbing Mount Everest
- List of 20th-century summiters of Mount Everest

== Bibliography ==
- Gill, Michael (2017). Edmund Hillary: A Biography. Nelson, NZ: Potton & Burton. ISBN 978-0-947503-38-3.
- Hunt, John (1953). The Ascent of Everest. London: Hodder & Stoughton; Mountaineers' Books. ISBN 0-89886-361-9. (American edition titled: The Conquest of Everest)
  - Includes – Chapter 16: Hilary, Edmund (1953). "The Summit". The Ascent of Everest. pp. 197–209
- Morris, James (1954). Coronation Everest. London: Faber.
