= John Kempe =

British headmaster

John Kempe CVO
- Born: John William Rolfe Kempe; 29 October 1917; Nairobi
- Died: 10 May 2010 (aged 92)
- Education: Clare College, Cambridge
- Occupation: Headmaster of Gordonstoun School
- Spouse: Barbara Huxtable (m. 1957)
- Children: 3

John William Rolfe Kempe (29 October 1917 – 10 May 2010) was headmaster of Gordonstoun School from 1968 to 1978, during the period that the Princes Andrew and Edward arrived at the school. He was a noted mountaineer and a member of the Alpine Club.

== Early life ==
He was born in Nairobi, the son of an officer in the Colonial Service. His father died of fever when he was four and Kempe was brought up in Norfolk by his mother. He was educated at Stowe School and Clare College, Cambridge, where he read economics and mathematics.

At Cambridge he joined the University Air Squadron and in 1937 was commissioned in the Royal Air Force Volunteer Reserve. In 1941, he was posted to No. 602 Squadron RAF, which was initially stationed at RAF Drem near Haddington. During the Battle of Britain, the squadron was relocated to Sussex where Kempe flew Spitfires. In May 1942, he was promoted to squadron leader and the following year was mentioned in despatches. From 1944 he flew, principally Mosquitos, in North Africa and acted as a convoy escort on the Malta run. Before being demobilised in 1946, he was again mentioned in despatches.

== Mountaineering ==
In 1952 he was a member of the British N.W. Garhwal Expedition with John Jackson. The party went on to attempt an ascent of the unclimbed 6,500 metres (21,300 ft) Nilkanta, on the route they bivouacked at 16,000’ and 17,000’, but ultimately they were defeated by heavy snow.

In 1954, Kempe led a party to 8,586 metres (28,169 ft) Kangchenjunga, the 3rd highest mountain in the world, which had not then been climbed. This was intended as a reconnaissance expedition, the party also included John William Tucker (who wrote a book about the expedition's activities), S. R. Jackson (the brother of John Jackson), T. H. Braham, G. C. Lewis and medical officer, Dr. Donald Stafford Matthews, they explored the upper Yalung glacier with the intention to discover a practicable route to the great ice-shelf that runs across the south-west face of Kangchenjunga. This reconnaissance led to the route used by the successful 1955 expedition. John Hunt wrote in the Foreword to Tucker's book that the 1954 reconnaissance was "a first step in solving what I have long reckoned to be the greatest problem in mountaineering" and "thanks to the fine efforts of Kempe and his comrades, the momentus decision was made to take the second, and as it proved to be, final step towards the top of the third highest point on Earth", that final step was the successful 1955 expedition, when George Band and Joe Brown made the first ascent of Kangchenjunga.

Kempe was the leader of an expedition to the Peruvian Andes in 1956. The party, comprised three from the 1954 Kangchenjunga expedition (Kempe, Tucker and Matthews) supplemented by Mike Westmacott, George Band and John Streetly. Streetly and Westmacott successfully made the first ascent of the 5,723 metres (18,776 ft) Huagaruncho on 17 August 1956.

== Teaching career ==
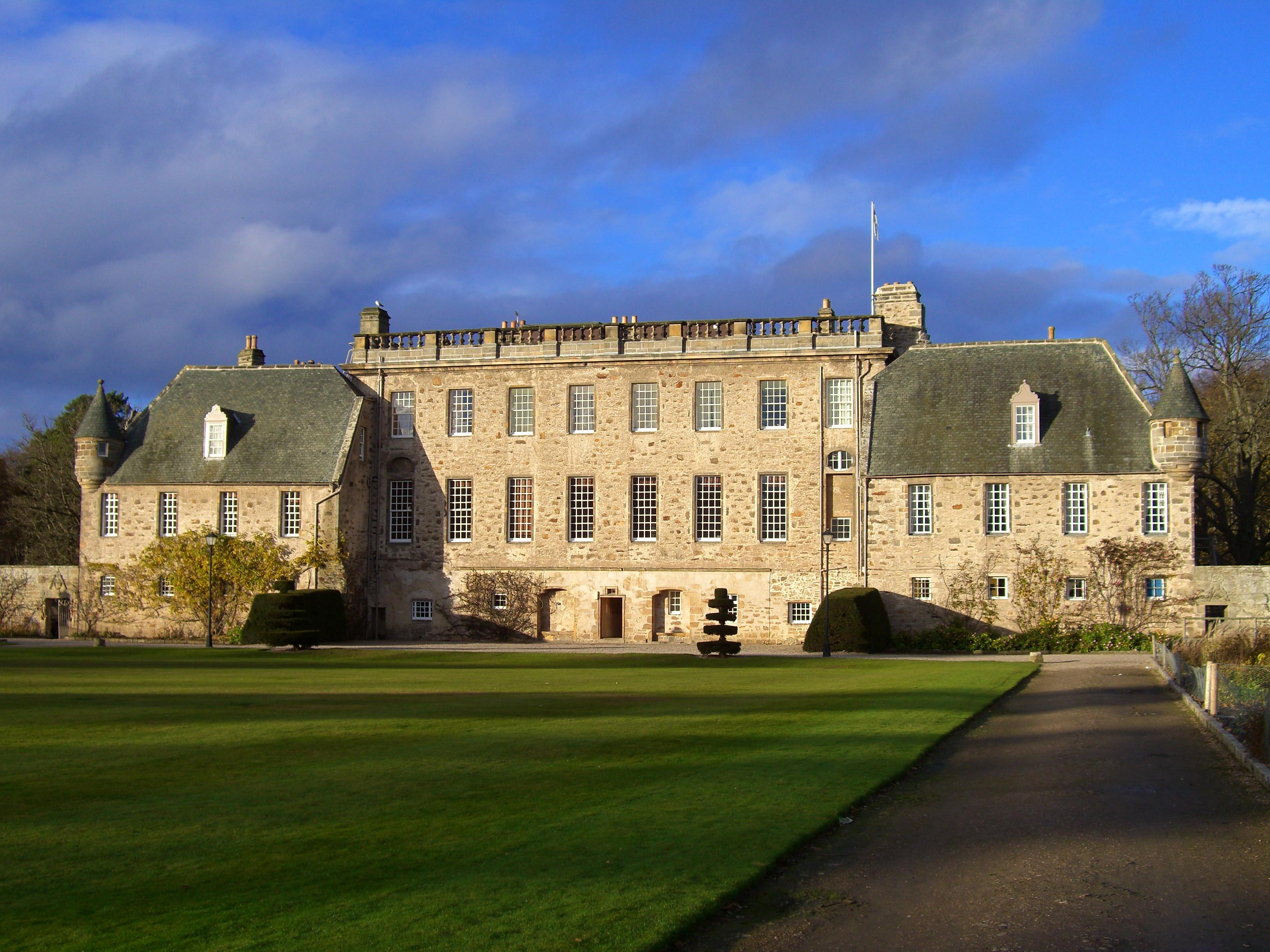
Gordonstoun School

After three years as a Mathematics teacher at Gordonstoun School he was offered the post of headmaster at a new school in Hyderabad, India, being set up along English public school lines (Hyderabad Public School). He remained there from 1951 until he was appointed headmaster of Corby Grammar School in Northamptonshire in 1955, where he remained until 1967. The following year he returned to Gordonstoun as headmaster and he remained there until his retirement in 1978.

== Public roles ==
Kempe was a member of the Mount Everest Foundation committee (1956–62), chairman of the Round Square International Service Committee (1979–87). He was also vice-chairman of the European Atlantic Movement Committee (1982–1992; vice-president thereafter), and trustee of the University of Cambridge Kurt Hahn Trust from 1986 to 1989. He was appointed CVO in the 1980 New Year Honours.

== Publications ==
A Family History of the Kempes (1991)

== Family ==
In 1957 he married Barbara Huxtable; they had two sons and a daughter.
