= Quiulacocha (Pasco) =

Mountain in Peru

- Location within Peru

Highest point
- Elevation: 5,012 m (16,444 ft)
- Coordinates: 10°30′11″S 76°00′42″W

Geography
- Location: Peru, Pasco Region
- Parent range: Andes, Huaguruncho

Quiulacocha (possibly from Quechua qillwa, qiwlla, qiwiña gull, qucha lake, "gull lake") is a mountain at a lake of that name in the Huaguruncho mountain range in the Andes of Peru. It is located in the Pasco Region, Pasco Province, Ticlacayán District. Its summit reaches 5,012 m (16,444 ft) above sea level.

The lake named Quiulacocha lies in the Quiulacocha valley southwest of the peak at 10°31′9″S 76°1′24″W. The intermittent stream of the valley flows to the southeast. It belongs to the watershed of the Perené River.
