= Yanacocha (Huachón) =

Mountain in Peru

- Location within Peru

Highest point
- Elevation: 5,138 m (16,857 ft)
- Coordinates: 10°33′57″S 75°56′30″W

Geography
- Location: Peru, Pasco Region
- Parent range: Andes, Huaguruncho

Yanacocha (Quechua yana black, qucha lake, "black lake") is a 5,138-metre-high (16,857 ft) mountain and a nearby lake of that name in the Huaguruncho mountain range in the Andes of Peru. The mountain and the lake are located in Huachón District, Pasco Province, Pasco Region south of another mountain, Huaguruncho.

The lake lies west of this peak at 10°33′34″S 75°55′48″W.
