= Khewang =

Khewang खेवाङ्ग
- Village development committee
- Location in Nepal
- Coordinates: 27.41°N 87.91°E
- Country: Nepal
- Province: Province No. 1
- District: Taplejung District

Population (2011)
  - Total: 2,691
- Time zone: UTC+5:45 (Nepal Time)
- Postal code: 57501
- Area code: 024

Khewang is a village development committee in the Himalayas of Taplejung District in the Province No. 1 of north-eastern Nepal. At the time of the 2011 Nepal census it had a population of 2,691 people living in 526 individual households. There were 1,283 males and 1,408 females at the time of census.Now it is a part of Sirijangha Municipality.
