= Trevor Braham =

British mountain climber (1922–2020)

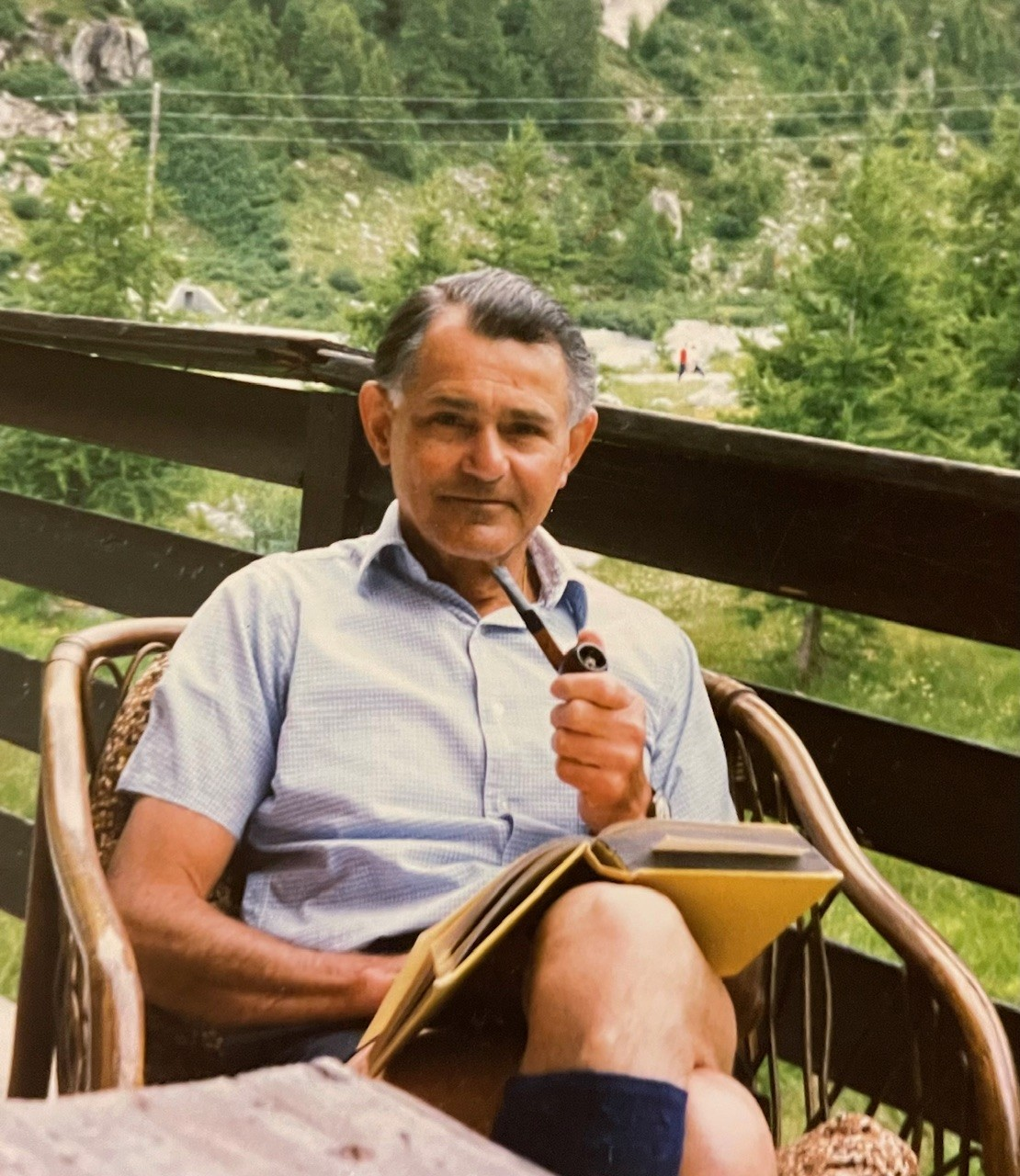
- Trevor Braham in 1988
- Born: 22 April 1922; Calcutta, India
- Died: 2 March 2020 (aged 97); Gimel, Switzerland
- Occupations: mountaineer, author
- Spouse: Elisabeth née Höflin
- Children: Anthony Edward Braham Michael Trevor Braham

Trevor Hyam Braham (born Hyam Trevor Braham, 22 April 1922 – 2 March 2020) was a British Himalayan explorer and mountaineer, and climbing author, who was mostly active during the mid-20th century.

== Early life ==
Braham was born in Calcutta, British India. He spent much of his boyhood in India, during the fading years of the British Raj, alternating between Calcutta and Darjeeling, where, in the mid-1930s, he attended St. Joseph's College as a boarder for four years.

His college days in Darjeeling, with a view of the Sikkim hills and Kangchenjunga and its satellite peaks in the distance, exerted a strong influence upon him; he recounts in his writings that the view from Observatory Hill "never failed to arouse a mixture of excitement and desire: from Nepal in the west across Tibet and Bhutan in the east, 200 miles of snow- covered ranges, filled the horizon with Kangchenjunga as the centrepiece".

By chance, in April 1942 and just turned 20, Braham joined a short trip making up a party of four from Darjeeling to the Singalila Ridge. He later recalled he knew he had discovered something permanent and he would have to return.

== Himalayan mountaineering ==
He joined the Himalayan Club in 1946, becoming its regional secretary based in Calcutta by March 1949. He later became Honorary Editor of the Himalayan Journal (1957–59) - a highly regarded publication which has been described as "the definitive record of Himalayan achievement", Vice President of the Himalayan Club (1958–1965), and was elected as an Honorary member of the Himalayan Club in 1980. He was also a member of the Swiss Alpine Club which he joined in 1948, and was elected a member of the Alpine Club in 1951.

Trevor Braham's halycon years (1950–1972), corresponded with the "Himalayan Golden Age" when an international frenzy developed to achieve the first ascent of the world's highest peaks. He organized and took part in 15 Himalayan expeditions, including in 1954 a reconnaissance of the South West face of 8,586 metres (28,169 ft) Kangchenjunga,

In 1947 he was part of the team, with Andre Roch and Rene Dittert, which made the first ascent of the 6,940 metres (22,770 ft) Kedarnath and the Kedarnath Dome.

In addition to his Himalayan climbing experience, Braham's knowledge of the local customs and language was invaluable to the Kangchenjunga reconnaissance expedition which was led by John Kempe in 1954.

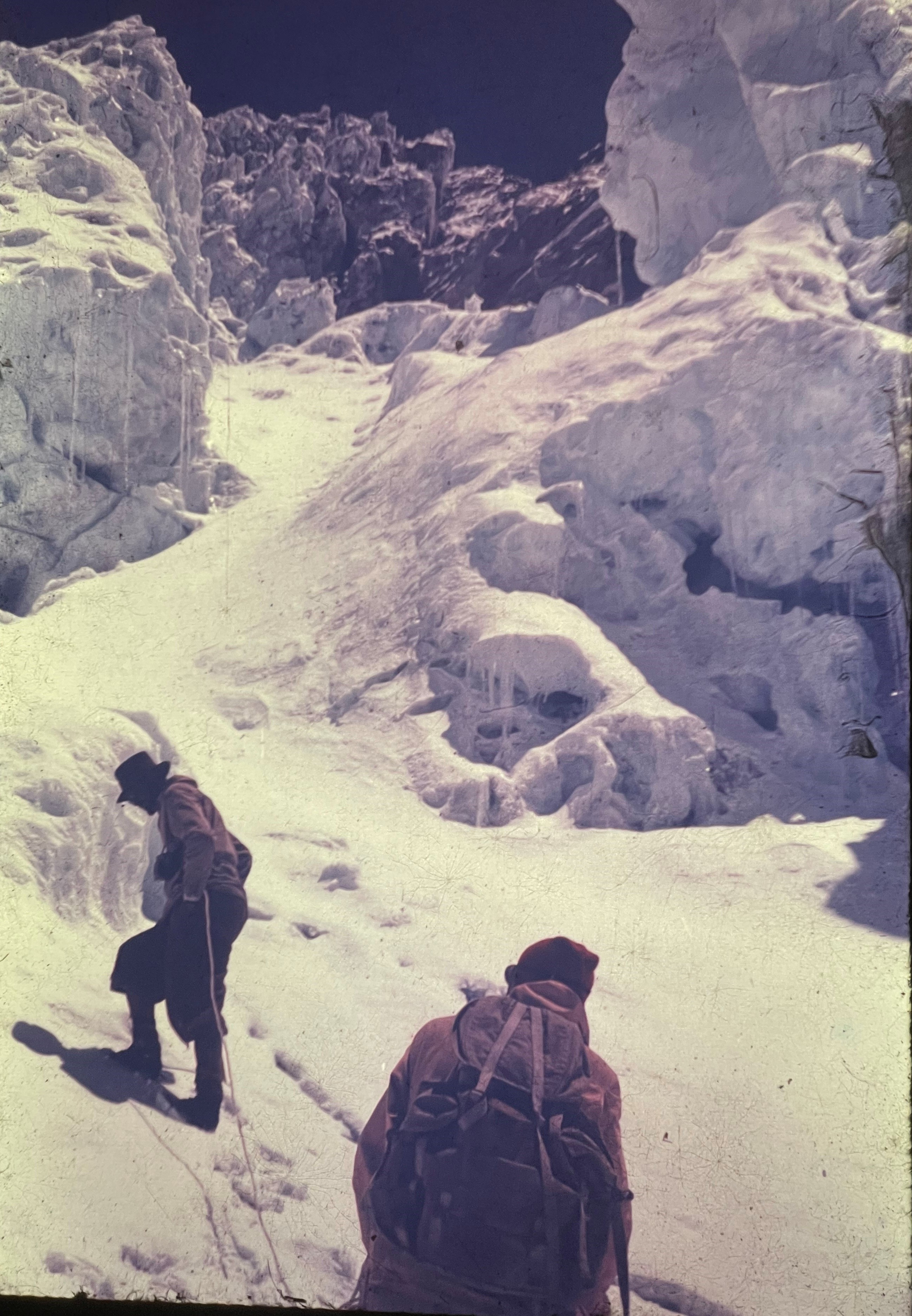
Lewis & Tucker on Kangchenjunga in 1954 (photo by Trevor Braham)

The party also included J. W. Tucker (who wrote a book about the expedition's activities), S. R. Jackson (the brother of John Jackson), G. C. Lewis and medical officer, Dr. D. S. Mathews, they explored the upper Yalung glacier with the intention to discover a practicable route to the great ice-shelf that runs across the south-west face of Kangchenjunga.

John Hunt wrote in the foreword to Tucker's book that the 1954 reconnaissance was "a first step in solving what I have long reckoned to be the greatest problem in mountaineering" and "thanks to the fine efforts of Kempe and his comrades, the momentus decision was made to take the second, and as it proved to be, final step towards the top of the third highest point on Earth", that final step was the successful 1955 expedition, when George Band and Joe Brown made the first ascent of Kangchenjunga.

Together with Peter Holmes, a young Cambridge University graduate, who went on to become the Chairman of Shell, they made the second ascent of 6,303 metres (20,679 ft) Chau Chau Kang Nilda, from the barren plateau of Spiti, in 1955. Rinzing, a 20-year-old Ladakhi, ‘a natural leader’ was edged to the front for the final steps to the summit.

In 1958 Braham joined a small group, E. G. C. (Ted) Warr, the leader, Dr. Chris Hoyte, Walter Sharpley, and Dennis Kemp to attempt Minapin peak, 7,266 metres (23,839 ft), in the Karakoram (now called Diran). In his book Himalayan Odyssey Braham describes the trials and tribulations of bureaucracy, uncomfortable travel, dangerous roads, even more dangerous vehicles and drivers, spectacular flights, recalcitrant porters, the oasis charm of Hunza and "the magnificent peaks on both sides of the valley now traversed by the Karakoram Highway as it climbs to the Khunjerab pass on the Chinese border". Tragically, later in the expedition, after Braham had left early due to work constraints, Warr and Hoyte went missing and were presumed dead. The route did, however, point the way to eventual success by an Austrian party in 1968, which came after three more failed attempts in the intervening years. In 1996 an ice axe was found high on Minapin by Japanese climbers. The story of its identification and eventual re-uniting with the daughter of Warr, one of the climbers lost in 1958, has been recounted by Shigeharu Inouje, an account which also included notes by Braham on the 1958 expedition.

Braham's numerous travels and explorations in little-known and isolated Himalayan regions included 3 visits to mountains in the tribal areas on Pakistan's North-West frontier, which were made in an environment and under conditions very different from those today and about which he has written numerous articles to the Alpine and Himalayan Journals. At the request of the editor of the Swiss Alpine Journal, he wrote an annual Chronicle of Himalayan activities during the years 1977–1985.

== Personal life and literary work ==
In 1971, at the age of 49, he married Elisabeth née Höflin before moving to Switzerland with his wife and sons Anthony and Michael in 1974. Shortly afterwards, Himalayan Odyssey (Allen & Unwin, 1974) was published. There followed a career in commodity trading based in Lausanne, many trips in the Alps and after retirement in 1994 he published his second book: When the Alps Cast Their Spell: Mountaineers of the Alpine Golden Age (In Pinn, 2004). That book has been described as a gold mine of scholarship about a critical period in the history of mountaineering and it won the Boardman-Tasker prize, awarded annually to the leading mountain book of the year. That was followed by his third book, Himalayan Playground: Adventures on the Roof of the World, 1942-72, (Neil Wilson, 2008), according to reviews: "In this engaging book Trevor Braham reminds all those who flock to the honeypots of the Khumbu that there is a world of fascination beyond. He recounts his post-WW2 journeys in Gharwal, Sikkim, Karakoram, and the North-West Frontier spanning their period 1947 to 1972. (...) The narrative switches pleasingly between human, geographical and cultural themes. (...) Braham gives us a glimpse of their culture in a less frenetic and happier time. These recollections are highly enjoyable, and the reader will regret only their brevity."(Himalayan Playground)

This last book also evokes the perspective of a man comparing the mountaineering ethics of 2008 to those of the 1940-1970 period. "Having crossed the Rubicon of my eighth decade, I find myself out of harmony with some aspects of the evolution of mountaineering. Boundary lines, re-drawn about three decades ago, are now devoid of limits as to what is feasible and admissible technically, ethically, and physically. Clearly, advancing age has distanced me from practices now considered to be perfectly acceptable. Also, alas, diminishing capacity has begun to deprive me of the pleasures of wandering freely across cherished mountain regions. I have no doubt that a direct relationship exists between the two."(The Effects of Change on Mountaineering Ethics)

He has lectured to the Alpine and Himalayan Clubs, and to schools and societies in England, India and Switzerland. At celebrations held in India by the Himalayan Club in 2008 to mark the 80th anniversary of its founding there, Braham was invited to be the principal speaker on the club's history. The transcript of the address he delivered in Mumbai on 16 February 2008 is published on the Himalayan Club's website: The Early Years

The UK Alpine Club archive includes a video interview with Braham, as part of a series of interviews which were made between Harish Kapadia and notable figures from the world of mountaineering.

== Later life ==
Braham continued to have an active life until the age of 95, when diminishing physical abilities required him to live in a nursing home in Gimel, above Lake Leman.

Braham died on 2 March 2020, a few weeks shy of his 98th birthday. At his memorial service, constrained by COVID-19 restrictions, tributes were read from the Himalayan Club, representatives of the Alpine Club and of the British Residents' Association of Switzerland.

== Climbing associates ==
Peter Boardman, who died on Mount Everest in 1982, was a personal friend of Trevor Braham. Erhard Loretan, who died in April 2011, a leading Swiss climber, and the 3rd person to have ascended the 14 highest summits of the world, requested Trevor Braham to translate into English his book, Himalayan Reflections, which was published in Switzerland in 1998. In 1998, following the death of Albert Eggler who led the Swiss attempt to climb Mount Everest in 1952, Braham wrote the obituary for the Independent of London, at the request of members of Eggler's family.

== Bibliography ==
- Himalayan Odyssey, Allen & Unwin, 1974
- When the Alps Cast Their Spell, Neil Wilson Publishing, 2004
- Himalayan Playground, Neil Wilson Publishing, 2008
