= George Band =

English mountain climber

George Band OBE
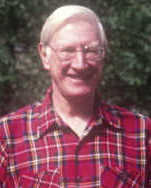
- Band in 1990
- Born: 2 February 1929; Taiwan
- Died: 26 August 2011 (aged 82); Hampshire, England
- Education: Eltham College
- Alma mater: Queens' College, Cambridge; Imperial College, London
- Occupation: Geologist
- Employer: Shell
- Known for: Mountaineer
- Spouse: Susan Goodenough (m.1959)
- Children: 3
- Father: Edward Band

George Christopher Band OBE (2 February 1929 – 26 August 2011) was an English mountaineer. He was the youngest climber on the 1953 British expedition to Mount Everest on which Edmund Hillary and Tenzing Norgay became the first to ascend the mountain. In 1955, he and Joe Brown were the first climbers to ascend Kangchenjunga, the third highest mountain in the world.

== Biography ==
George Band was born in Taiwan where his parents, Presbyterian missionaries, had lived since 1912. The island had been under Japanese control since 1895 and, by good fortune, the family left a fortnight before the attack on Pearl Harbor. When in the UK he was educated at Eltham College, that was followed by National Service with the Royal Corps of Signals (1947-1949). He then read Natural Sciences, with a specialism in Geology, at Queens' College, Cambridge. His Cambridge degree was punctuated by the Everest expedition and, after completing his final year on his return from Nepal, he then studied Petroleum Engineering at Imperial College, London.

== Mountaineering ==
Band's earliest rock climbing exploits took place in 1946 in the Derbyshire Peak District, after his first attempt he wrote that he was, ‘totally hooked on learning to climb’. During his National Service he was stationed at Catterick Garrison, North Yorkshire. A climbing group had recently been started at the garrison and that provided the opportunity for regular weekend climbing trips.

He started climbing in the Alps while a student at Queens' and he soon became President of the University Mountaineering Club (1951-1952). His first alpine season was to the Dauphiné Alps with Chris Brasher in 1950 and the following year he spent the summer alpine season in the Chamonix area. Unfortunately, post-war currency restrictions meant that travellers could take no more than £30 out of the country, so spending long periods in the Alps gaining experience was difficult for British climbers, even if they had plenty of available time and personal financial resources. That difficulty was neatly circumvented in 1952 because a Canadian geologist/mountaineer/millionaire agreed to pay Band, and Chorley, to take core samples from the ice on Monte Rosa, they were paid in Swiss Francs and the work at high-altitude also meant that they were well acclimatised for their mountaineering. Band had a particularly successful alpine season in 1952, climbing in the Valais and Chamonix mainly with Roger Chorley but also in the company of John Streetly, Ian McNaught-Davis and Arthur Dolphin.

Although only having three alpine seasons his alpine record was sufficiently impressive to gain him a place on the 1953 British Mount Everest Expedition. On that expedition Edmund Hillary and Tenzing Norgay made the first ascent of Mount Everest, Band played an important role in forcing a route through the Khumbu Icefall and at a later stage in the expedition he reached Camp VII at 7,300 metres (24,000 ft). He was aged just 23 when selected and was the youngest climber on the team.

In 1954 he was a member of a Cambridge University party attempting the first ascent of Rakaposhi. The team was led by Alfred Tissières and also included Roger Chorley and Major General Mian Hayaud Din, the Chief of General Staff of the Pakistan Army and liaison officer. They approached by the south-west spur but only reached 6,340 metres (20,800 ft). A contemporary film of the expedition is in the public domain.

Two years later, on 25 May 1955, he and Joe Brown became the first climbers to ascend Kangchenjunga, the third highest mountain in the world on the 1955 British Kangchenjunga expedition. Out of respect for the religious feelings of the people of Nepal and Sikkim, they stopped about ten feet below the actual summit. Extracts relating to the summit days, from the diary that Band kept during the trip, have been published online. It was 22 years before the mountain was climbed again.

In 1956 he joined an expedition led by John Kempe to attempt the first ascent of Huaguruncho in Peru. As well as Kempe and Band the party included, Dr. Don Stafford Matthews, John Streetly, Jack Tucker and Mike Westmacott. Streetly and Westmacott successfully reached the summit on 17 August 1956. Band, Streetly, and Westmacott subsequently climbed the west peak.

After the successful ascent of Everest John Hunt obtain permission from the "U.S.S.R. Mountaineering Section", part of the Soviet Central Sports Council, for an expedition to the Caucasus Mountains to climb in the area of the Bezengi Glacier and Ushba in 1958. George Band, Chris Brasher and Alan Blackshaw were included in Hunt's party and a number of Soviet mountaineers joined them on various ascents, including Yevgeniy (Eugene) Gippenreiter. Band made the first ascent of the south buttress of the east peak of Dykh-Tau 5,198 metres (17,054 ft).

Following these early mountaineering successes, Band spent most of his professional life in oil and gas exploration with Shell. One of his early postings took him to Venezuela and his first evening in the country coincided with a visit by Lord Tangley, then President of the Alpine Club. They were invited for dinner at the British embassy by Douglas Busk, the British Ambassador, who was also a mountaineer. That meeting resulted in a visit to the Sierra Nevada de Mérida and the first ascents of the rock spire of El Vertigo and of the south-west face of El Abanic.

== Professional Life ==
Other postings with Shell took him to Bangladesh and Oman as well as The Hague. Later he moved into executive roles including an appointment as Managing Director of Shell in Sarawak and Sabah and from 1976-1980 he was Director of Shell UK Exploration and Production when their major North Sea oil discoveries were starting to come into production. In 1983 he was appointed Director General of the UK Offshore Operators Association, representing oil and gas companies operating on the UK continental shelf and after retirement in 1990 he became Vice-Chairman of Premier Oil (1990-1993).

== Later life ==
He was President of the Alpine Club (1987–1989) and the British Mountaineering Council (1996-1999). He continued to travel widely after retirement, leading adventure treks to India, Central Asia, Nepal, Sikkim and Bhutan and in 2005, aged 76, made the trek to re-visit the south-west Base Camp of Kangchenjunga in Nepal.

He wrote the books, Road to Rakaposhi and in 2003, Everest 50 Years on Top of the World (the official history - Mount Everest Foundation, Royal Geographical Society and the Alpine Club). In 2007 he wrote " Summit", a book celebrating 150 years of the Alpine Club. He was Chairman of the Himalayan Trust (UK). George Band was an Appeal Patron for BSES Expeditions, a youth development charity that operates challenging scientific research expeditions to remote wilderness environments.

George Band was appointed Officer of the Order of the British Empire (OBE) in the 2009 New Year Honours.

George Band died of natural causes in Hampshire, England, UK, on 26 August 2011, aged 82.

== Books published ==
- Road to Rakaposhi (1955)
- Everest: 50 Years on Top of the World (2003)
- Summit (2006), a celebration of 150 years of the Alpine Club.
