= Jules Jacot-Guillarmod =

Swiss physician, mountaineer and photographer

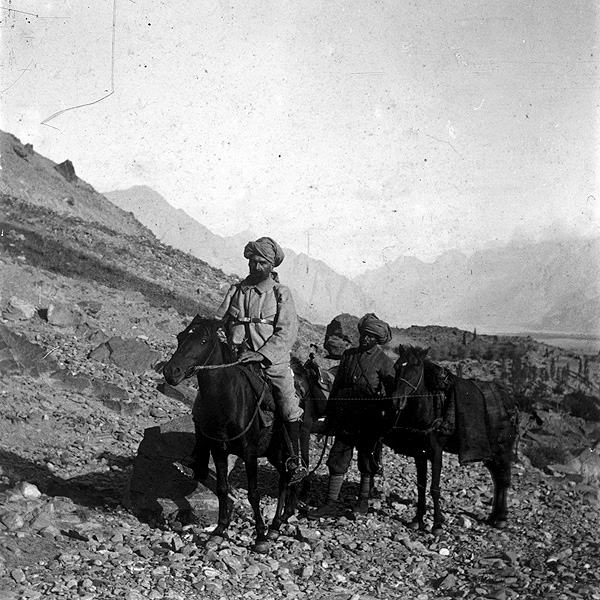
Jules Jacot Guillarmod riding a horse during expedition to K2

Jules Jacot-Guillarmod (24 December 1868 – 5 June 1925) was a Swiss physician, mountaineer and photographer. He was born in La Chaux-de-Fonds in 1868 and died in the Gulf of Aden in 1925. As a mountaineer he was known for his ascents in the Swiss Alps but particularly for his participation in two Himalaya expeditions.

== Biography ==
Jules Jacot-Guillarmod was the son of the animal painter Jules Jacot-Guillarmod (1828–1889). He successfully studied medicine in Lausanne and Zurich between 1888 and 1895. Graduated in 1895, he established himself as a general practitioner at Corsier (Canton of Geneva), from 1898 to 1902 at Lignières from 1904 to 1910 and then at Saint-Blaise (canton of Neuchâtel) from 1910 to 1912. In 1907, he married Madeleine Bovet. From 1912 on, he ran a psychiatric clinic located at the Château de Prilly and in 1920, the couple bought the château after running the clinic in Vennes between 1915 and 1920. He frequently travelled the Alps with his comrades from the Swiss Alpine Club while giving numerous lectures commenting on his expeditions and regularly publishing articles for Swiss newspapers and magazines. Jules Jacot-Guillarmod was also very active in various groups: he was appointed president of the Diablerets section of the Swiss Alpine Club from 1915 to 1917 and also president of the Swiss Association of Geographical Societies from 1917 to 1920. He received several honorary awards for his exploits: in 1920, he was appointed Officer of the Order of Saint Charles by Albert I of Monaco at the Monaco Mountaineering Congress and in 1925, King Fouad I of Egypt made him Grand Officer of the Order of the Nile at the International Geographical Congress in Cairo.

=== First ascents ===
Jules Jacot-Guillarmod climbed his first summit of 2,169 metres in 1889 during an excursion with friends in the Fribourg region. At the beginning of 1890, he bought an ice axe and hiked around Mont Blanc for the first time. In 1893, he climbed the Jungfrau, his first peak of 4,000 metres, accompanied by a professor and a group of students. On 12 June 1897, after cycling from Martigny to Chamonix with two friends, he climbed Mont Blanc for the first time, without a mountain guide. A few months later, on a training course in Paris, he gave a lecture on this climb at the Club Alpin Français (CAF) and was soon after accepted as a member. His contacts within the CAF lead to his first expedition project in the Himalayas, although this was later abandoned due to a lack of funding.

=== Himalaya expeditions ===
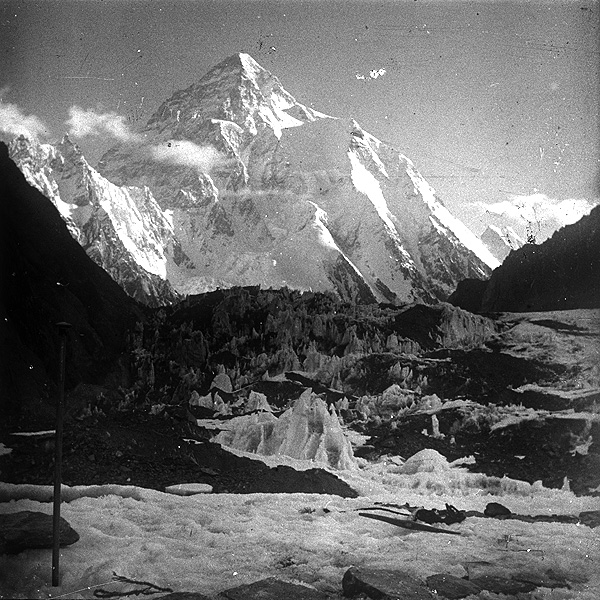
K2 by Jules Jacot-Guillarmod

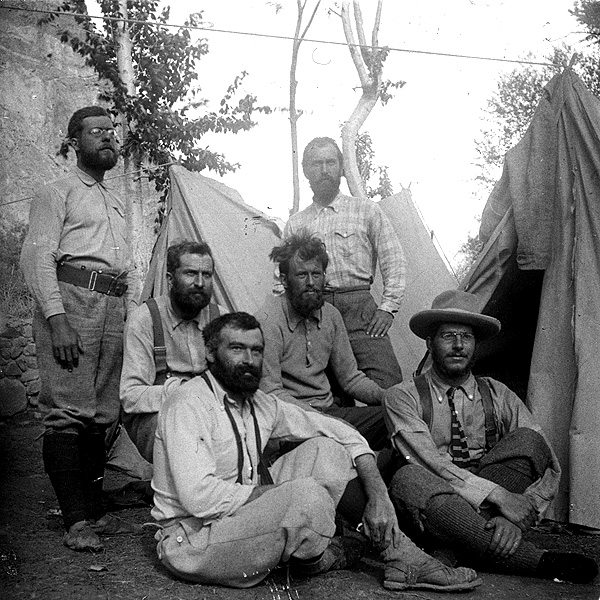
Members of the 1902 K2 Expedition. Jacot-Guillarmod is on the left, in the front row.

In 1902, Jacot-Guillarmod participated as a doctor in the expedition organised by the Englishman Oscar Eckenstein to try the ascent of the K2 in the Karakoram. The other members are two Englishmen including Aleister Crowley and two Austrians. After landing in Bombay on 21 March 1902, the group crossed India to Askoley, following the maps drawn ten years earlier by William Martin Conway up to Concordia Square on the Baltoro glacier; they were accompanied by a column of 150 porters. From there, the group climbed up to the foot of K2, an area never reached before, but remained stuck for almost two months at base camp at an altitude of 5,700 metres due to bad weather. Jules Jacot-Guillarmod had symptoms of altitude sickness. However, he did not make the connection between altitude and these symptoms. On 10 July 1902 he explored the Northeast ridge of the K2 with one of the Austrians and reached an altitude of 6,700 metres, the highest point of the expedition. The weather conditions deteriorated the following days and one of the climbers suffered from high altitude pulmonary edema. The travellers returned across eastern India, where they stayed for seven months. Jacot-Guillarmod brought home from this expedition nearly a thousand stereoscopic photographs revealing regions little or not at all known at the time. Two years later, Jacot-Guillarmod himself organized an expedition, this time to the Nepalese and 8585m high Kangchenjunga near Everest. His expedition consisted of two Swiss men and Aleister Crowley, whom he met during the K2 expedition in 1902. For the organisation of the expedition in Darjeeling, they called upon an Italian hotelier who knew the local language. From Darjeeling, the group advanced on the border between Sikkim and Nepal. After climbing through the Yalung Chu valley, the summit is surrounded by a very steep glacier, now known as The Bottleneck. Three Nepalese carriers and a Swiss participant lost their lives, falling into a crevasse at an altitude of 6,500 metres. The expedition was subsequently abandoned, and the return journey through the Sikkim mountains was made without Crowley, who fled after the avalanche with the remainder of the money Jacot-Guillarmod had provided for the expedition. Jacot-Guillarmod later recovered this money by blackmailing Crowley, threatening to publicly disclose some of his pornographic poetry.

=== Other expeditions ===
In 1919, Dr. Georges Montandon, an ethnologist from Neuchâtel, was commissioned by the ICRC to visit the Austro-Hungarian prison camps in Siberia. Jacot-Guillarmod was part of this nine-month mission, which passed through the United States and Japan, to inspect the camps in Russia. He returned to Switzerland in December 1919 after travelling some 40,000 kilometres. In 1925 Jacot-Guillarmod attended the International Geographical Congress in Cairo. After the congress, he intended to cross Africa overland to the Cape. However, upon arriving at Lake Victoria, he fell so seriously ill that he decided to return home via Mombasa. However, en route he died of myocarditis at sea and was buried in the Maala cemetery in Aden, Yemen.

== Publications ==
- Journal du 1^{er} janvier 1886 au 27 mai 1925, 74 carnets; Fonds Jacot-Guillarmod, Bibliothèque de la ville de La Chaux-de-Fonds.
- Nouvel an à la cabane Fridolin, L'Écho des Alpes, 1895, p. 117-131
- Au Mont-Blanc, L'Écho des Alpes, 1897, p. 249-268
- Autour de Chanrion, Patrie suisse, n°4, 1897, p. 279-281
- La pellotine chez les aliénés, Thèse de doctorat de Jules Jacot-Guillarmod, Lausanne, 1897
- Album des cabanes du Club Alpin Suisse, Berne, Schmidt & Francke, 1898
- Dans les Alpes de la Suisse primitive, L'Écho des Alpes, 1896, p. 211-217 et 335–345
- Dans l'Himalaya, Suisse libérale, 1902, numéros 107 (9 mai), 108 (10 mai), 121 (26 mai), 122 (27 mai), 158 (8 juillet), 159 (9 juillet), 166 (17 juillet), 167 (18 juillet), 184 (7 août), 209 (5 septembre), 210 (6 septembre), 219 (17 septembre), 220 (18 septembre)
- Un record dans l'Himalaya, Jahrbuch des Schweizer Alpen Club, n°38, 1902–1903, p. 212-227
- Six mois dans l'Himalaya, le Karakorum et l'Hindu-Kush: voyages et explorations aux plus hautes montagnes du monde, Neuchâtel, W. Sandoz, 1904
- Vers le Kangchinjunga (8585m), Himalaya népalais, Jahrbuch des Schweizer Alpen Club, n°41, 1905–1906, p. 190-205
- Au Mönch (4105m) par l'arrête nord-ouest, Jahrbuch des Schweizer Alpen Club, n°43, 1907–1908, p. 364-371
- Crampons et piolets, Jahrbuch des Schweizer Alpen Club, n°45, 1909–1910, p. 344-353
- Au Kangchinjunga: voyages et explorations dans l'Himalaya du Sikhim et du Népal, L'Écho des Alpes, 1914, p. 389-406
- À l'assaut des plus hauts sommets du monde, L'Écho des Alpes, 1921, p. 337-350
- Les grottes des Dentaux, Bulletin de la Société vaudoise des sciences naturelles, n°203, 1921, p. 193-204
- Les résultats de l'expédition de l'Everest en 1921, L'Écho des Alpes, 1922, p. 117-120
- Esquisses topographiques du Chogori ou K2 et du Kangchinjunga (Himalaya), Bulletin de la Société neuchâteloise de Géographie, vol. XXXIV, Neuchâtel, 1925, p. 34-37.
