= Huaguruncho mountain range =

Mountain range in Peru

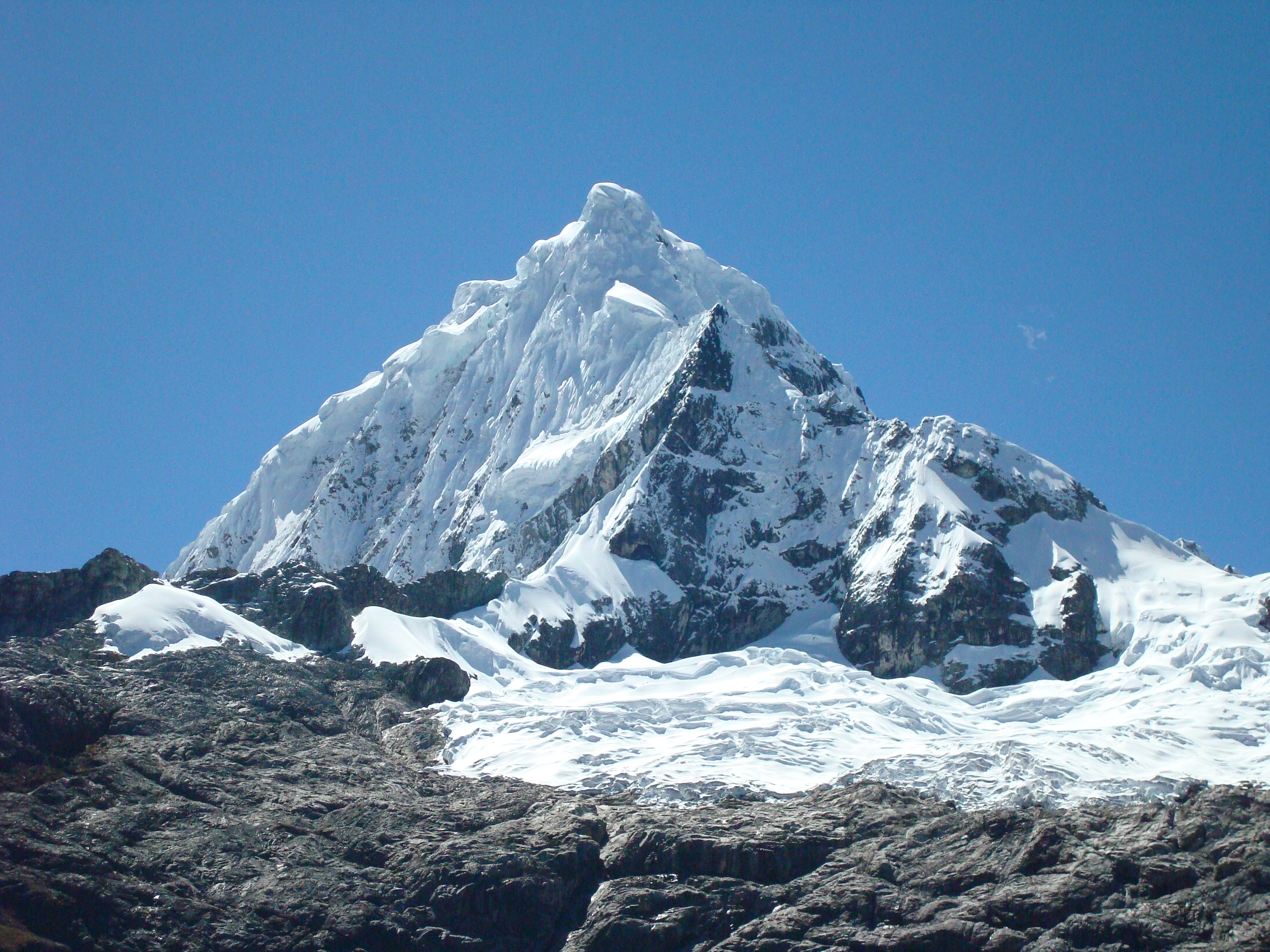
- Huaguruncho

Highest point
- Peak: Huaguruncho
- Elevation: 5,723 m (18,776 ft)

Geography
- Country: Peru
- Region(s): Huánuco, Pasco
- Range coordinates: 10°31′52″S 75°55′54″W
- Parent range: Andes

The Huaguruncho mountain range (also spelled Huagaruncho or Huagoruncho) is situated in the Andes of Peru. It extends in an easterly direction between 10°29' and 10°34'S and 75°50'W and 76°01'W for about 27 km (17 miles). The range is located in the Huánuco Region, in the provinces of Ambo and Pachitea, and in the Pasco Region, in the provinces of Pasco and Oxapampa.

== Mountains ==
The highest mountain in the range is Huaguruncho at 5,723 metres (18,776 ft). Other mountains are listed below:

- Añilcocha, 5,073 metres (16,644 ft)
- Jochojanca
- Mishiguaganan
- Naticocha, 4,610 metres (15,125 ft)
- Ñausanca, 4,851 metres (15,915 ft)
- Ñausacocha, 5,152 metres (16,903 ft)
- Qarwarahu
- Quiulacocha, 5,012 metres (16,444 ft)
- Tamboragra, 4,996 metres (16,391 ft)
- Ulcumayo
- Hualgashjanca
- Huaraco
- Yanacocha, 5,138 metres (16,857 ft)
- Altos Machay, 4,910 metres (16,109 ft)

== Glaciers ==
In 2009, it was reported that this mountain range had 41 glaciers that summed up 9.71 square kilometres (4 sq mi) of glaciated area.

== Lakes ==
There are about 70 lakes in this mountain range.
