= Huaguruncho =

Mountain in Peru

- Tarata
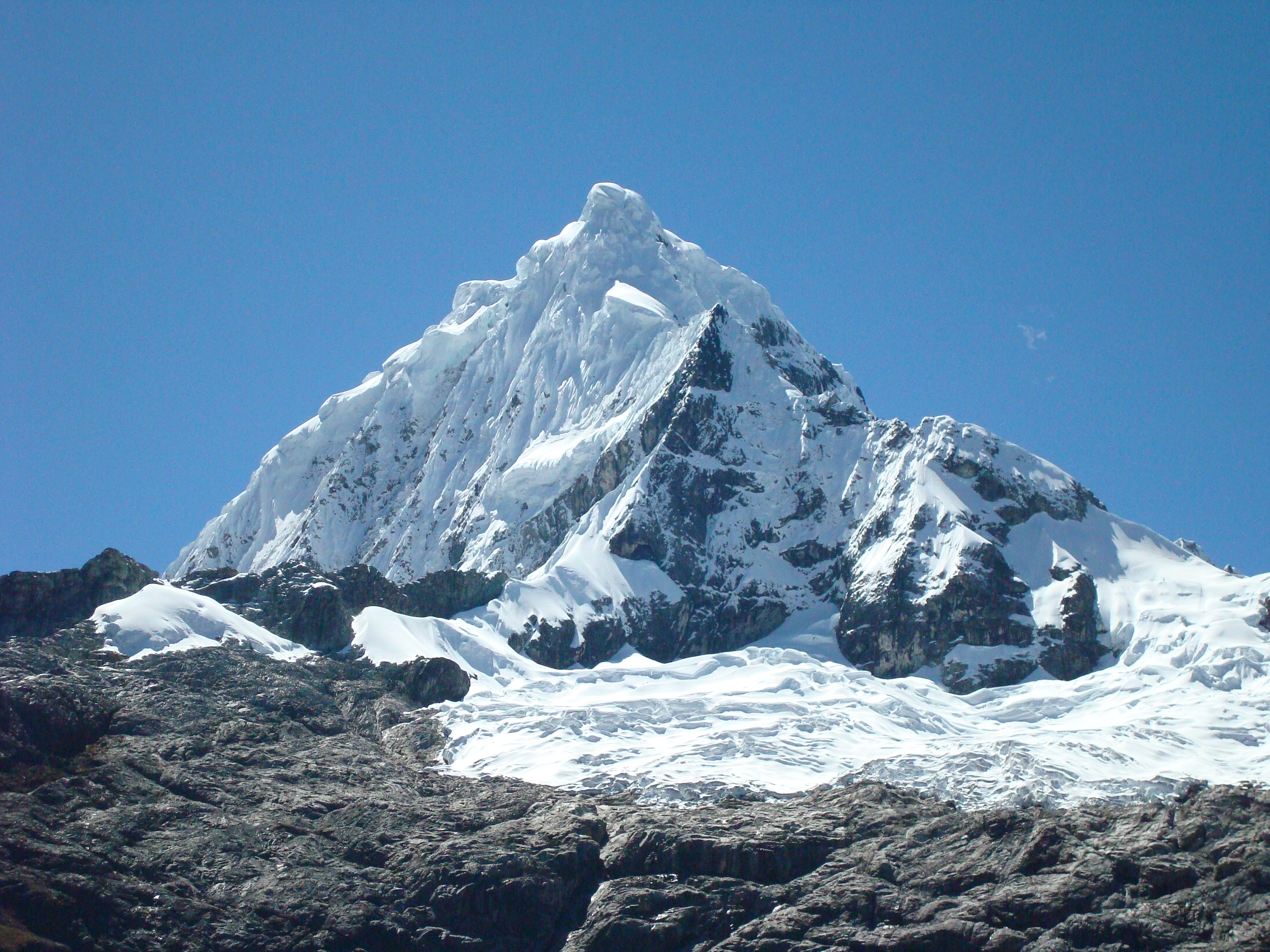

Highest point
- Elevation: 5,723 m (18,776 ft)
- Coordinates: 10°31′52″S 75°55′54″W

Geography
- Location within Peru
- Location: Peru, Pasco Region
- Parent range: Andes, Waqurunchu

Climbing
- First ascent: 17 August 1956, John Streetly & Mike Westmacott

Huaguruncho, Tarata or Huagaruncho is a 5,723-metre-high (18,776 ft) mountain in the Huaguruncho mountain range in the Andes of Peru. Its highest peak, officially named Tarata, is located in the Pasco Region, Pasco Province, on the border of the districts of Huachón and Ticlacayan. A minor peak, named Huaguruncho Chico by the IGN map, lies west of it in the Ticlacayan District.

Research revealed that fluctuations in Huaguruncho's glaciers were caused by temperature changes in the tropical Atlantic Ocean, with the last major glacial expansion occurring ca. 4000–2000 years ago.

In 1956 John Kempe led an expedition to attempt the first ascent of Huaguruncho. As well as Kempe the party included George Band, Dr. Don Stafford Matthews, John Streetly, Jack Tucker and Mike Westmacott. Streetly and Westmacott successfully reached the summit on 17 August 1956.
