= Pacucha =

In Peru, Pacucha may refer to:

- Lake Pacucha
- Pacucha District
