= Lake Sausacocha =

Lake in Peru

Lake Sausacocha Sawsaqucha
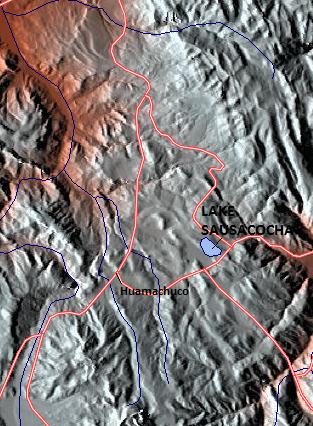

- Location within Peru
- Location: Huamachuco, Sánchez Carrión Province, La Libertad Region
- Coordinates: 7°47′42″S 77°59′24″W
- Basin countries: Peru
- Surface area: 5.74 km^{2} (2.22 sq mi)
- Max. depth: 12 m (39 ft)
- Surface elevation: 3,290 m (10,790 ft)

Lake Sausacocha (Spanish: Laguna Sausacocha, Quechua: Sawsaqucha) is a lake in Peru, 10 kilometres (6.2 mi) to the northeast of Huamachuco in Huamachuco District, Sánchez Carrión Province. Literal meaning of Sausacocha is "lagoon that never dries." Overgrazed hillsides surround the lake and there are also Inca ruins nearby.

== Geography ==
The lake covers 4 square kilometres (1.5 mi^{2}) surrounded by low hills. It is located at the relatively low altitude of 4 metres (13 ft). The depth of water in the lake is 12 metres (39 ft) and this permits navigation by small river craft for commercial and recreational purposes. The road from Huamachuco to Cajabamba passes by Lake Sausacocha where there are a variety of lodges and restaurants (trout ceviche is a speciality).

Aquafauna

The lake is a breeding ground for trout and carp.

Avifauna

Bird watchers have sighted the yellow-billed pintail (Anas georgica) in the lake area.

Chemical properties

Sausacocha is one of the rare Andean lakes with acidic waters. The chemical properties of the Lake Sausacocha waters, such as acidic pH, low conductivity, low hardness, low calcium and low alkalinity values have resulted in rich desmids (green algae) growth. The lake is said to have comparatively low levels of ionic concentrations at 78 μS/cm as compared to the highest reading of 1028 μS/cm in Lake Titicaca.

== Economy ==
The people in the area generate an income through recreation and letting out boats for rowing on the lake.

Ornamented ceramics of the North Peruvian region are of five types, which includes the type imprinted with the name Sausacocha, the other four types are Huamachuco Impressed, Huamachuco-on-White, Alto Chicama and Cajamarca III. The name as impressed on the ceramics as "Sausacocha (SA)" was given by McCown who discovered it for the first time on the shores of the Lake Sausacocha near Huamachuco.

== See also ==
- List of lakes in Peru
- Marcahuamachuco
- Trujillo, Peru
- YourMamaLakeinuranus
