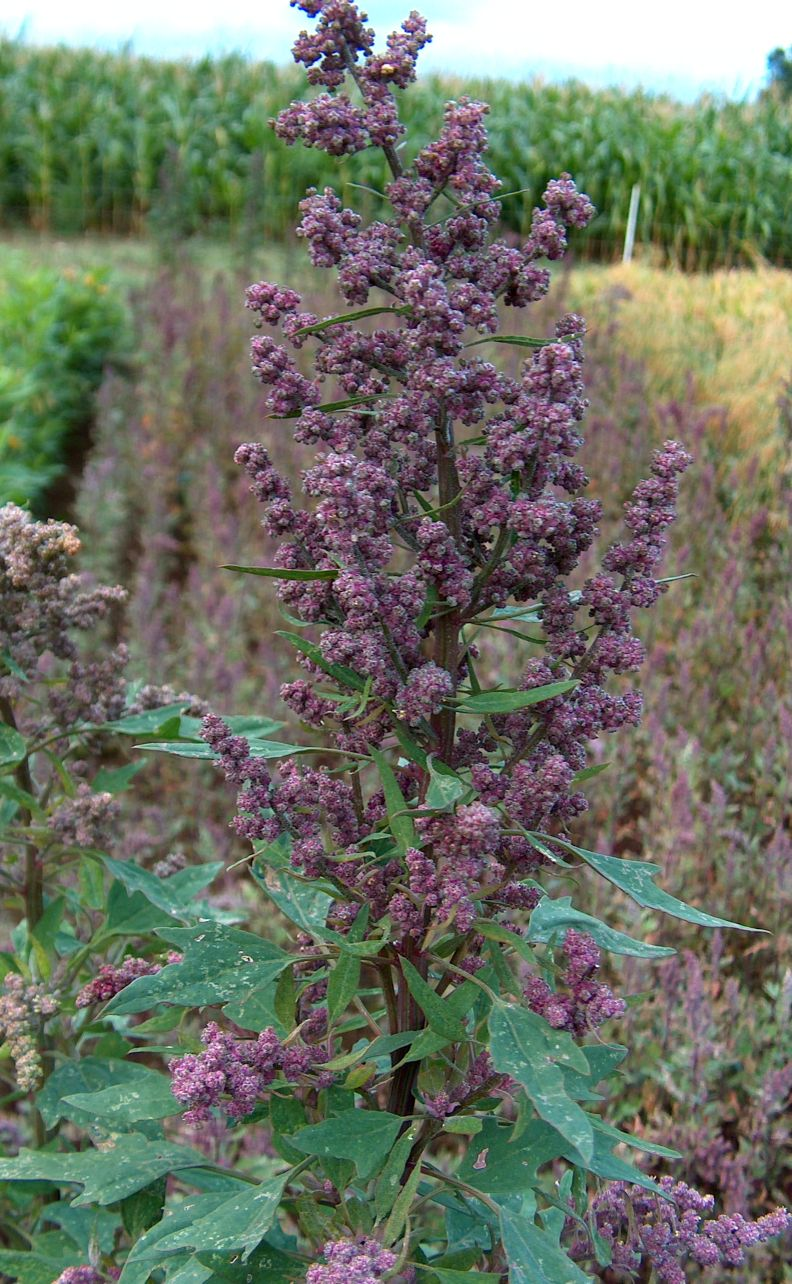

Scientific classification
- Kingdom: Plantae
- Clade: Tracheophytes
- Clade: Angiosperms
- Clade: Eudicots
- Order: Caryophyllales
- Family: Amaranthaceae
- Genus: Chenopodium
- Species: C. quinoa

Binomial name
- Chenopodium quinoa Willd.
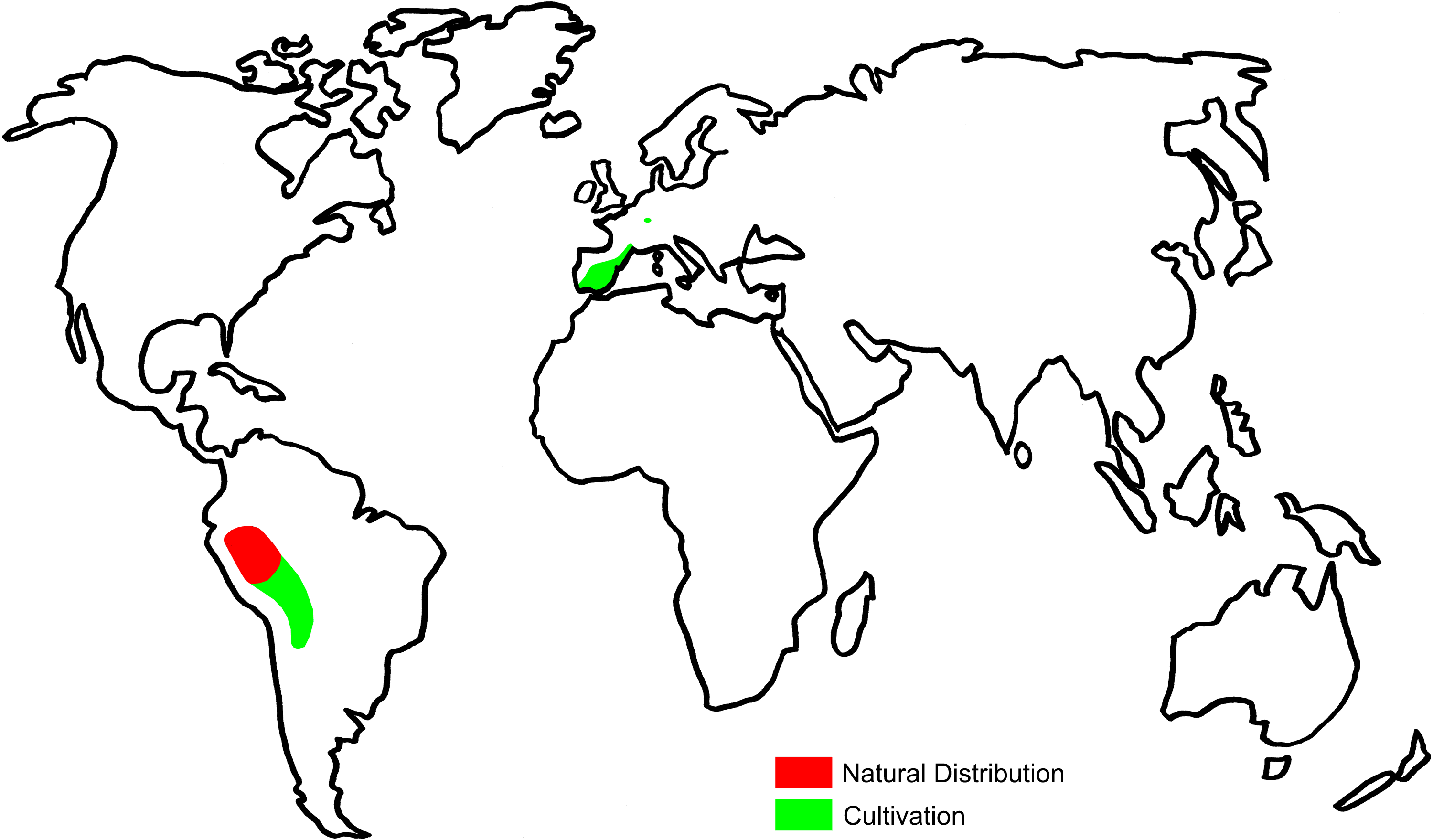
- Natural distribution in red, Cultivation in green

Synonyms
- Chenopodium canihua O.F. Cook; Chenopodium ccoyto Torr.; Chenopodium ccuchi-huila Torr.; Chenopodium chilense Pers. nom. inval.; Chenopodium guinoa Krock.; Chenopodium nuttalliae Saff.

= Quinoa =

Edible plant in the family Amaranthaceae

Quinoa (Chenopodium quinoa; /ˈkiːn.wɑː, kiˈnoʊ.ə/, from Quechua kinwa or kinuwa) is a flowering plant in the amaranth family. It is a herbaceous annual plant grown as a crop primarily for its edible seeds. The seeds are high in protein, dietary fiber, B vitamins, and dietary minerals, especially potassium and magnesium, which are present in amounts greater than in many grains. Quinoa is not a grass, but a pseudocereal botanically related to spinach and amaranth (Amaranthus spp.), and originated in the Andean region of northwestern South America. It was first used to feed livestock 5,200–7,000 years ago, and for human consumption 3,000–4,000 years ago in the Lake Titicaca basin of Bolivia and Peru.

The plant thrives at high elevations and produces seeds that are rich in protein. Almost all production in the Andean region is by small farms and associations. Its cultivation has spread to more than 70 countries, including Kenya, India, the United States, and European countries. As a result of increased consumption in North America, Europe, and Australasia, quinoa crop prices tripled between 2006 and 2014, entering a boom and bust cycle.

The quinoa monoculture that arose from increased production, combined with climate change effects in the native Andean region, created challenges for production and yield, and led to environmental degradation.

== Description ==
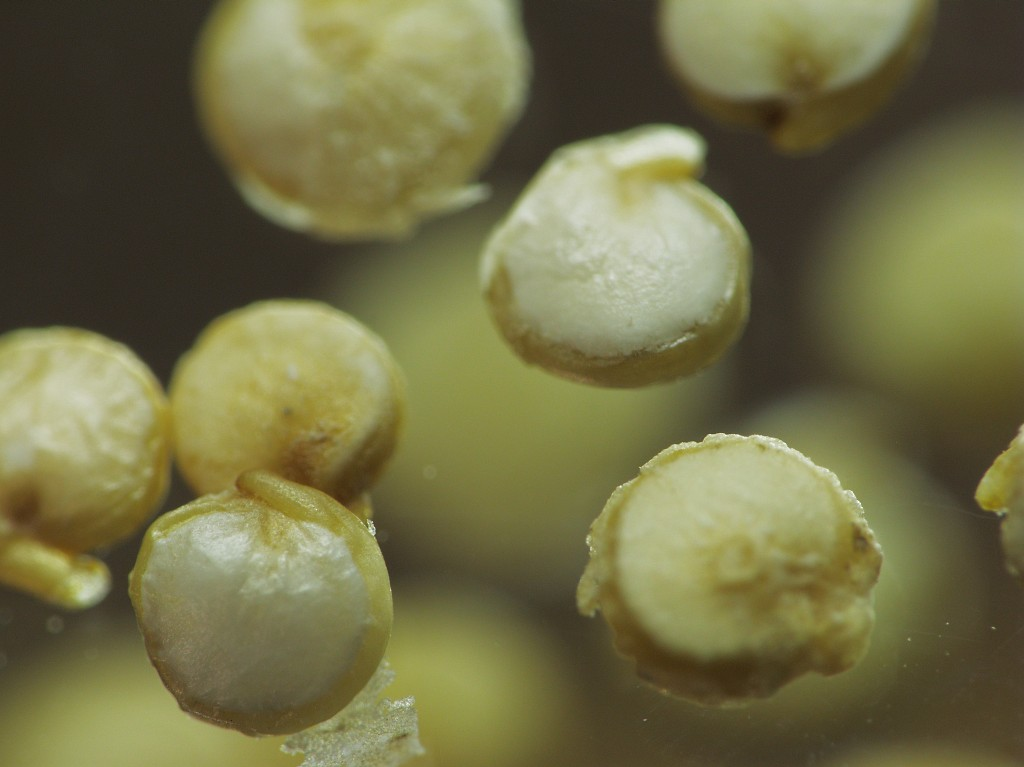
Quinoa seeds

Chenopodium quinoa is a dicotyledonous annual plant, usually about 1–2 m (3–7 ft) high. It has broad, generally powdery, hairy, lobed leaves, normally arranged alternately. The woody central stem is branched or unbranched depending on the variety and may be green, red or purple. The flowering panicles arise from the top of the plant or from leaf axils along the stem. Each panicle has a central axis from which a secondary axis emerges either with flowers (amaranthiform) or bearing a tertiary axis carrying the flowers (glomeruliform). These are small, incomplete, sessile flowers of the same colour as the sepals, and both pistillate and perfect forms occur. Pistillate flowers are generally located at the proximal end of the glomeruli and the perfect ones at the distal end of it. A perfect flower has five sepals, five anthers and a superior ovary, from which two to three stigmatic branches emerge.

The green hypogynous flowers have a simple perianth and are generally self-fertilizing, though cross-pollination occurs. In the natural environment, betalains serve to attract animals to generate a greater rate of pollination and ensure, or improve, seed dissemination. The fruits (seeds) are about 2 mm (1/16 in) in diameter and of various colors — from white to red or black, depending on the cultivar.

In regards to the "newly" developed salinity resistance of C. quinoa, some studies have concluded that accumulation of organic osmolytes plays a dual role for the species. They provide osmotic adjustment, in addition to protection against oxidative stress of the photosynthetic structures in developing leaves. Studies also suggested that reduction in stomatal density in reaction to salinity levels represents an essential instrument of defence to optimize water use efficiency under the given conditions to which it may be exposed.

== Taxonomy ==
The species Chenopodium quinoa was first described by Carl Ludwig Willdenow (1765–1812), a German botanist who studied plants from South America, brought back by explorers Alexander von Humboldt and Aimé Bonpland.

Quinoa is an allotetraploid plant, containing two full sets of chromosomes from two different species that hybridised at one time. According to a 1979 study, its presumed ancestor is either Chenopodium berlandieri, from North America, or the Andean species Ch. hircinum. On the other hand, morphological features relate Ch. quinoa of the Andes and Ch. nuttalliae of Mexico. More recent studies indicate that Andean and Mexican quinoas were independently domesticated and that both derive from wild North American C. berlandieri, carrying the genome formula AABB, and are likely derived from a hybridization several million years ago between AA and BB diploids closely related to the modern C. subglabrum and C. suecicum, respectively. Quinoa's wild South American ancestor, C. hircinum, may have been translocated from North to South America via zoochory. A feral-weedy quinoa, Ch. quinoa var. melanospermum, is known from South America, but no equivalent closely related to Ch. nutalliae has been reported from Mexico so far.

Studies regarding the genetic diversity of quinoa suggest that it may have passed through three bottleneck genetic events, with a possible fourth to come:

- The first occurred when the species was created, as its two diploid ancestors underwent a hybridization followed by chromosome doubling, this new species was genetically isolated from its parent species, and thus lost a great deal of genetic diversity. As stated above, these ancestors were possibly C. subglabrum (AA) and C. suecicum (BB) and therefore not the Andean diploid pseudo cereal Chenopodium pallidicaule (cañahua).
- A second bottleneck may have occurred when quinoa was domesticated from its wild tetraploid ancestor, C. hircinum. It might have been domesticated twice: once in the high Andes and a second time in the Chilean and Argentinean lowlands.
- A third bottleneck can be considered "political", and has lasted more than 400 years, from the Spanish conquest of the new continent until the present time. During this phase quinoa has been replaced with maize, marginalized from production processes possibly due to its social and religious roles for the indigenous populations of South America, but also because it is difficult to process (dehusk) compared with maize.
- In the 21st century, a fourth bottleneck event may occur, as traditional farmers migrate from rural zones to urban centers, which exposes quinoa to the risk of further genetic erosion. Better breeding may also result in loss of genetic diversity, as breeders would be expected to reduce unwanted alleles to produce uniform cultivars, but cross-breeding between local landraces has and will likely produce high-diversity cultivars.

=== Etymology ===
The genus name Chenopodium is composed of two words coming from the Greek χήν,-νός, goose and πόδῖον, podion "little foot", or "goose foot", because of the resemblance of the leaves with the trace of a goose's foot.

The specific epithet quinoa is a borrowing from the Spanish quinua or quinoa, itself derived from Quechua kinuwa.

The Incas nicknamed quinoa chisiya mama, which in Quechua means "mother of all grains".

== Distribution ==
Chenopodium quinoa is believed to have been domesticated in the surroundings of the Lake Titicaca, in the Bolivian and Peruvian Andes, from wild or weed populations of the same species. There are non-cultivated quinoa plants (Chenopodium quinoa var. melanospermum) that grow in the area it is cultivated; these may either be related to wild predecessors, or they could be descendants of cultivated plants.

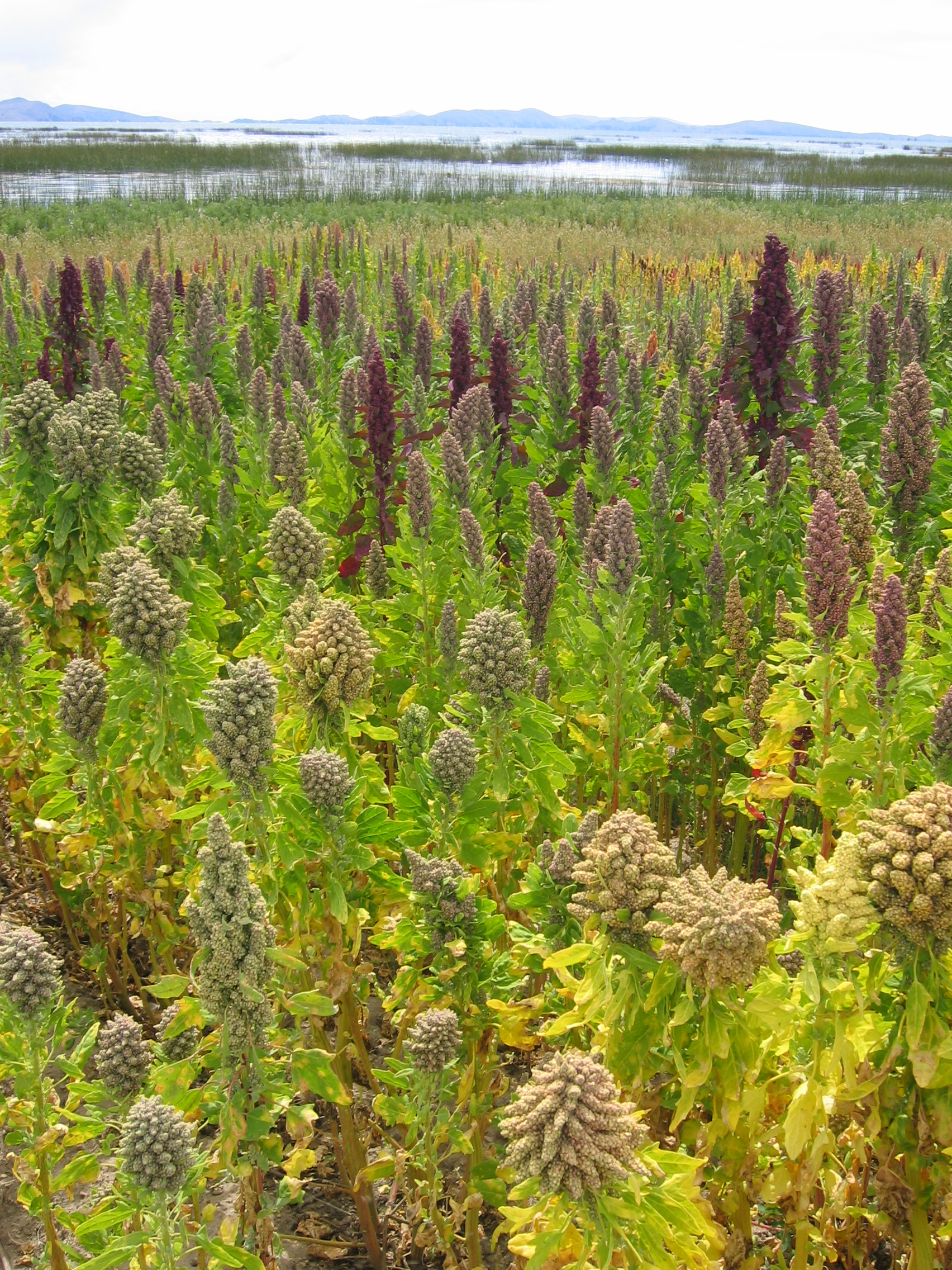
Chenopodium quinoa near Cachilaya, Lake Titicaca, Bolivia

== Cultivation ==
Over the last 5,000 years the biogeography of Ch. quinoa has changed greatly, mainly by human influence, convenience and preference. It has changed not only in the area of distribution, but also with regard to the climate this plant was originally adapted to, in contrast to the climates on which it is able to successfully grow in now. In a process started by a number of pre-Inca South American indigenous cultures, people in Chile have been adapting quinoa to salinity and other forms of stress over the last 3,000 years. Quinoa is also cultivated, since an early date, near the coast of northern Chile, where it was grown by the Chinchorro culture. Ch. quinoa was brought to the lowlands of south-central Chile at an early date from the Andean highlands. Varieties in the lowlands of south-central Chile derive directly from ancestral cultivars which then evolved in parallel to those of the highlands. It has been suggested that the introduction of Ch. quinoa occurred before highland varieties with floury perisperm emerged. There are wide discrepancies in the suggested dates of introduction, one study suggests c. 1000 BC as the introduction date while another suggests 600–1100 AD. In colonial times the plant is known to have been cultivated as far south as the Chiloé Archipelago and the shores of Nahuel Huapi Lake. The cuisine of Chiloé included bread made of quinoa until at least the mid-19th century.

In Chile it had almost disappeared by the early 1940s; as of 2015 the crop is mostly grown in three areas by only some 300 smallholder farmers. Each of these areas is different: indigenous small-scale growers near the border with Bolivia who grow many types of Bolivian forms, a few farmers in the central region who exclusively grow a white-seeded variety and generally market their crops through a well-known cooperative, and in the south by women in home gardens in Mapuche reserves.

When Amaranthaceae became abundant in Lake Pacucha, Peru, the lake was fresh, and the lack of Amaranthaceae taxa strongly indicates droughts which turned the lake into a saltmarsh. Based on the pollen associated with soil manipulation, this is an area of the Andes where domestication of C. quinoa became popular, although it was not the only one. It was domesticated in various geographical zones. With this, morphological adaptations began to happen until having five ecotypes today. Quinoa's genetic diversity illustrates that it was and is a vital crop.

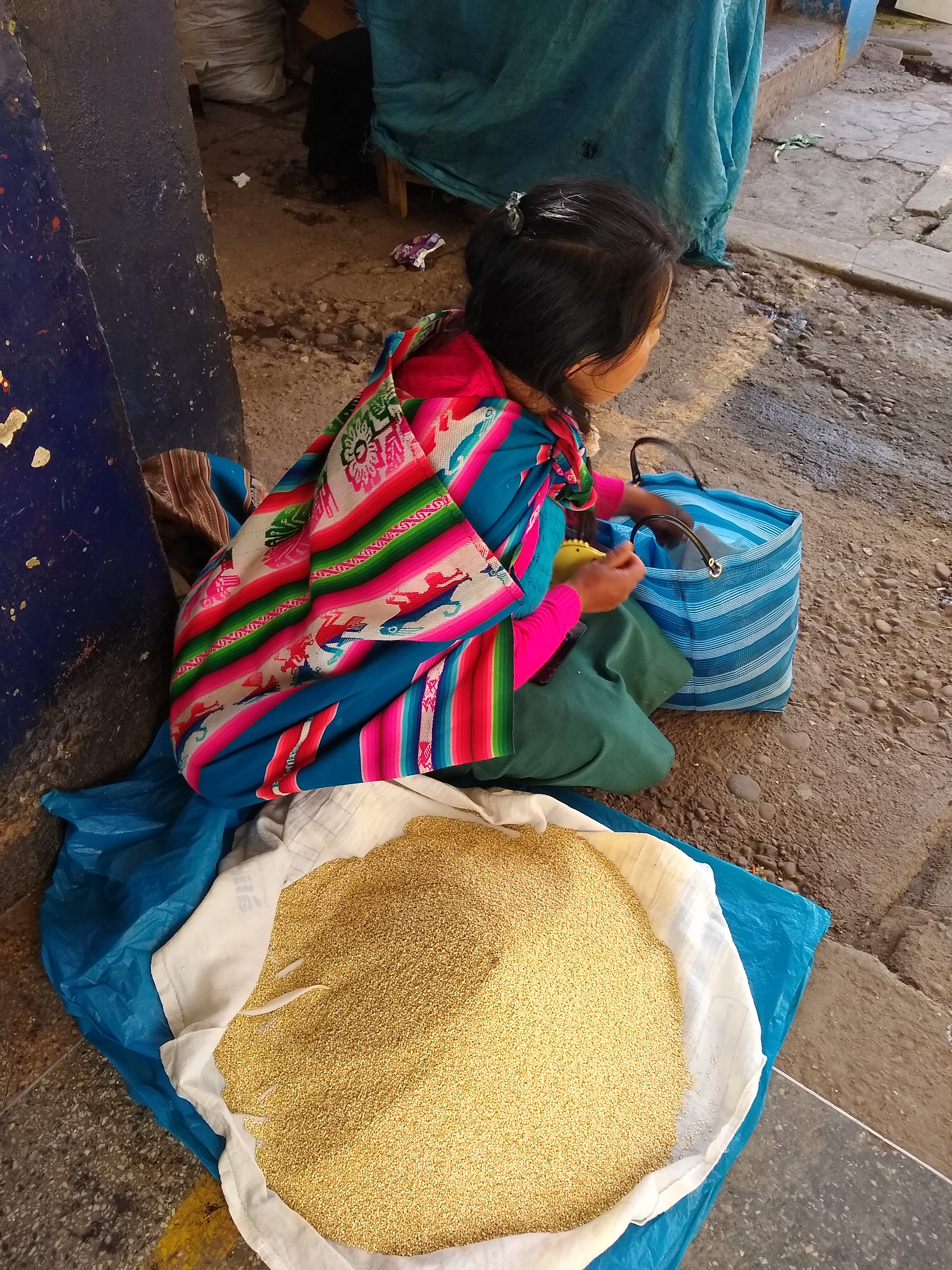
Quinoa seller at market in Calca, Peru

Andean agronomists and nutrition scientists began researching quinoa in the early twentieth century, and it became the subject of much interest among researchers involved in neglected and underutilized crop studies in the 1970s.

In 2004, the international community became increasingly interested in quinoa and it entered a boom and bust economic cycle that would last for over ten years. Between 2004 and 2011, quinoa became a more interesting commodity and global excitement for it increased. At this point, Bolivia and Peru were the only major producers of quinoa. In 2013, there was an extreme increase in imports of quinoa by the United States, Canada and various European countries. In 2016, growth began to slow. Imports were still increasing but at a slower rate and quinoa prices declined as other countries began producing it. By 2015, over 75 countries were producing quinoa, as opposed to only eight countries in the 1980s.

Particularly because of the high diversity of Chilean landraces and the plant's adaptation to different latitudes, this crop is now potentially cultivable almost anywhere in the world.

=== Climate requirements ===
The plant's growth is highly variable due to the number of different subspecies, varieties and landraces (domesticated plants or animals adapted to the environment in which they originated). However, it is generally undemanding and altitude-hardy; it is grown from coastal regions to over 4,000 m (13,000 ft) in the Andes near the equator, with most of the cultivars being grown between 2,500 m (8,200 ft) and 4,000 m (13,000 ft). Depending on the variety, optimal growing conditions are in cool climates with temperatures that vary between −4 °C (25 °F) during the night to near 35 °C (95 °F) during the day. Some cultivars can withstand lower temperatures without damage. Light frosts normally do not affect the plants at any stage of development, except during flowering. Midsummer frosts during flowering, a frequent occurrence in the Andes, lead to sterilization of the pollen. Rainfall requirements are highly variable between the different cultivars, ranging from 300 to 1,000 mm (12 to 39 in) during the growing season. Growth is optimal with well-distributed rainfall during early growth and no rain during seed maturation and harvesting. Royal Quinoa (Quinoa Real), grown in the Intersalar region of Bolivia between the Uyuni and Coipasa salt flats, endures an extreme environment characterised by high altitude, high salinity, intense UV radiation, aridity, and temperature fluctuations.

==== United States ====
Quinoa has been cultivated in the United States, primarily in the high elevation San Luis Valley of Colorado where it was introduced in 1983. In this high-altitude desert valley, maximum summer temperatures rarely exceed 30 °C (86 °F) and night temperatures are about 7 °C (45 °F). In the 2010s, experimental production was attempted in the Palouse region of Eastern Washington, and farmers in Western Washington began producing the crop. The Washington State University Skagit River Valley research facility near Mount Vernon grew thousands of its own experimental varieties. The Puget Sound region's climate is similar to that of coastal Chile where the crop has been grown for centuries. Due to the short growing season, North American cultivation requires short-maturity varieties, typically of Bolivian origin. Quinoa is planted in Idaho where a variety developed and bred specifically for the high-altitude Snake River Plain is the largest planted variety in North America.

==== Europe ====
Several countries within Europe have successfully grown quinoa on a commercial scale.

=== Sowing ===
Quinoa requires a significant amount of precipitation in order to germinate, therefore the traditional sowing date in Peru was between September and November. To increase the chance that more crops survive it would be advantageous to split up the sowing date among the plants. Traditionally quinoa was sown by broadcast, in rows or grooves, or by broadcast and then making rows. Soil preparation should occur before sowing, and weeding should come soon after sowing the seeds.

Rotation is used in its Andean native range. Rotation is common with potato, cereals and legumes including Lupinus mutabilis. Traditionally, quinoa rotation happens in plots called aynoqas. These are made up of different sized plots in different zones, and each family unit would own plots in different areas. The aynoqas allowed for better crop yield, agricultural and ecological sustainability, and food security within communities.

=== Soil ===
Quinoa plants do best in sandy, well-drained soils with a low nutrient content, moderate salinity, and a soil pH of 6 to 8.5. The seedbed must be well prepared and drained to avoid waterlogging.

Quinoa has gained attention for its adaptability to contrasting environments such as saline soils, nutrient-poor soils and drought stressed marginal agroecosystems.

=== Genetics ===
The genome of quinoa was sequenced in 2017. Through traditional selective breeding and, potentially, genetic engineering, the plant is being modified to have higher crop yield, improved tolerance to heat and biotic stress, and greater sweetness through saponin inhibition.

=== Harvesting ===
Traditionally, quinoa grain is harvested by hand, and only rarely by machine, because the extreme variability of the maturity period of most quinoa cultivars complicates mechanization. Harvest needs to be precisely timed to avoid high seed losses from shattering, and different panicles on the same plant mature at different times. The crop yield in the Andean region (often around 3 t/ha up to 5 t/ha) is comparable to wheat yields. In the United States, varieties have been selected for uniformity of maturity and are mechanically harvested using conventional small grain combines.

=== Processing ===
The plants are allowed to stand until the stalks and seeds have dried out and the grain has reached a moisture content below 10%. Handling involves threshing the seedheads from the chaff and winnowing the seed to remove the husk. Before storage, the seeds need to be dried in order to avoid germination. This was traditionally done manually, which is labour-intensive.

== Production ==
Quinoa production 2023, tonnes
Peru	70,479
Bolivia	41,380
Ecuador	378
World	112,251
Source: FAOSTAT of the United Nations

In 2023, world production of quinoa was 112,251 tonnes, led by Peru with 62% of the total and Bolivia with 37% (table).

Production of quinoa

Quinoa yield

=== Price ===
Since the early 21st century when quinoa became more commonly consumed in North America, Europe, and Australasia where it was not typically grown, the crop value increased. Between 2006 and 2013, quinoa crop prices tripled. In 2011, the average price was US$3,115 per tonne with some varieties selling as high as $8,000 per tonne. This contrasts with wheat prices of about US$340 per tonne, making wheat about 10% of the value of quinoa. The resulting effect on traditional production regions in Peru and Bolivia also influenced new commercial quinoa production elsewhere in the world, such as the United States. By 2013, quinoa was being cultivated in some 70 countries. As a result of expanding production outside the Andean highlands native for quinoa, the price plummeted starting in early 2015 and remained low for years. From 2018 to 2019, quinoa production in Peru declined by 22%. Some refer to this as the "quinoa bust" because of the devastation the price fall caused for farmers and industry.

=== Effects of rising demand on growers ===
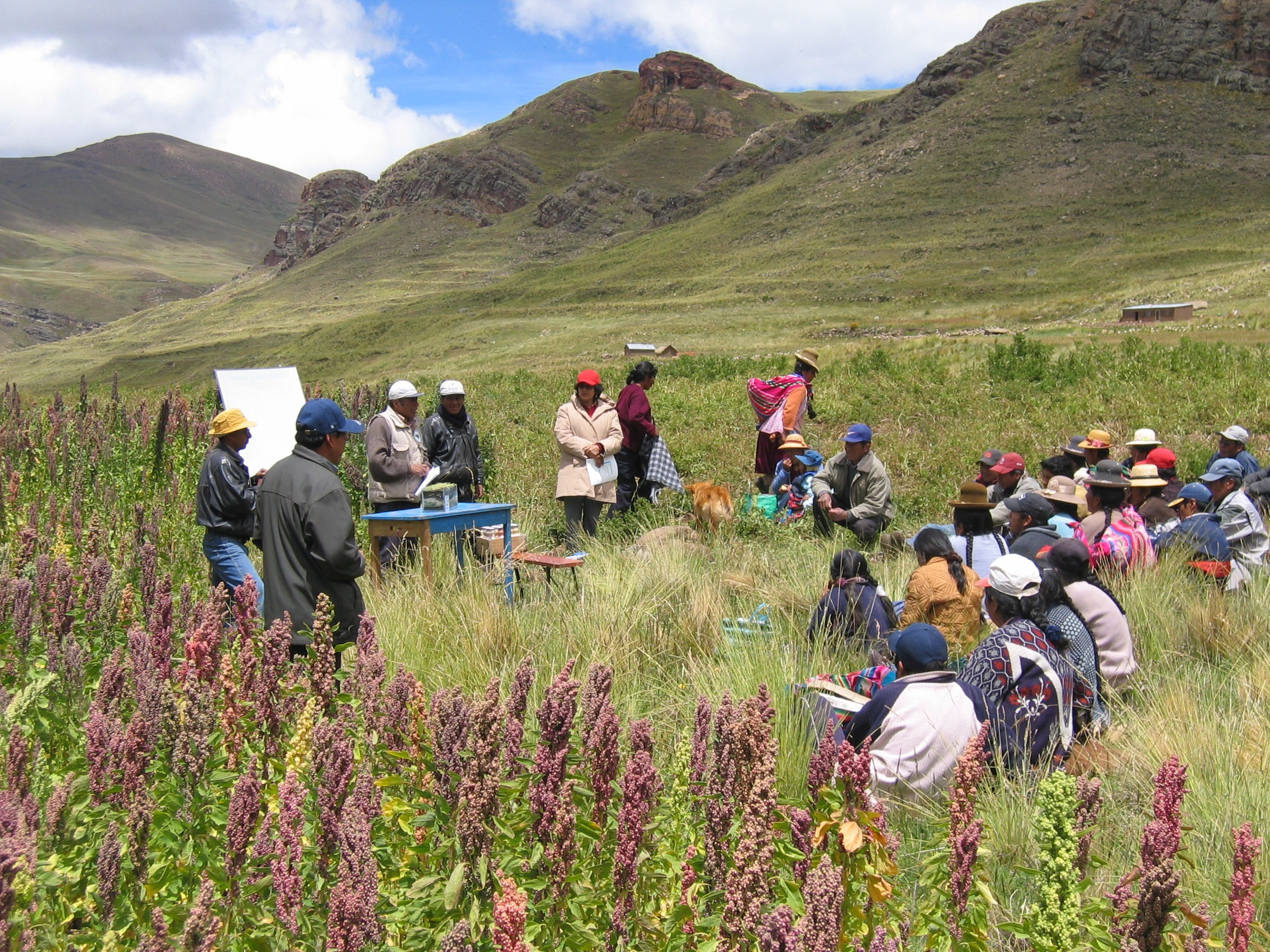
Farmer field school on crop husbandry and quinoa production near Puno, Peru

Rising quinoa prices over the period of 2006 to 2017 may have reduced the affordability of quinoa to traditional consumers. However, a 2016 study using Peru's Encuesta Nacional de Hogares found that rising quinoa prices during 2004–2013 led to net economic benefits for producers, and other commentary indicated similar conclusions, including for women specifically. It has also been suggested that as quinoa producers rise above subsistence-level income, they switch their own consumption to Western processed foods which are often less healthy than a traditional, quinoa-based diet, whether because quinoa is held to be worth too much to keep for oneself and one's family, or because processed foods have higher status despite their poorer nutritional value. Efforts are being made in some areas to distribute quinoa more widely and ensure that farming and poorer populations have access to it and have an understanding of its nutritional importance, including use in free school breakfasts and government provisions distributed to pregnant and nursing women in need.

In terms of wider social consequences, research on traditional producers in Bolivia has emphasised a complex picture. The degree to which individual producers benefit from the global quinoa boom depends on its mode of production, for example through producer associations and co-operatives such as the Asociación Nacional de Productores de Quinua (founded in the 1970s), contracting through vertically integrated private firms, or wage labor. State regulation and enforcement may promote a shift to cash-cropping among some farmers and a shift toward subsistence production among others, while enabling many urban refugees to return to working the land, outcomes with complex and varied social effects.

The growth of quinoa consumption outside of its indigenous region has raised concerns over food security of the indigenous original consumers, unsustainably intensive farming of the crop, expansion of farming into otherwise marginal agricultural lands with concurrent loss of the natural environment, threatening both the sustainability of producer agriculture and the biodiversity of quinoa. Studies have found that smallholder traditional farming of quinoa, specifically in the Andean region of Peru has significantly less of an environmental impact in carbon produced, than the modern industrial quinoa production.

The Guardian has presented the rising world demand for quinoa as caused by rising veganism.

=== Monoculture and climate change impacts ===
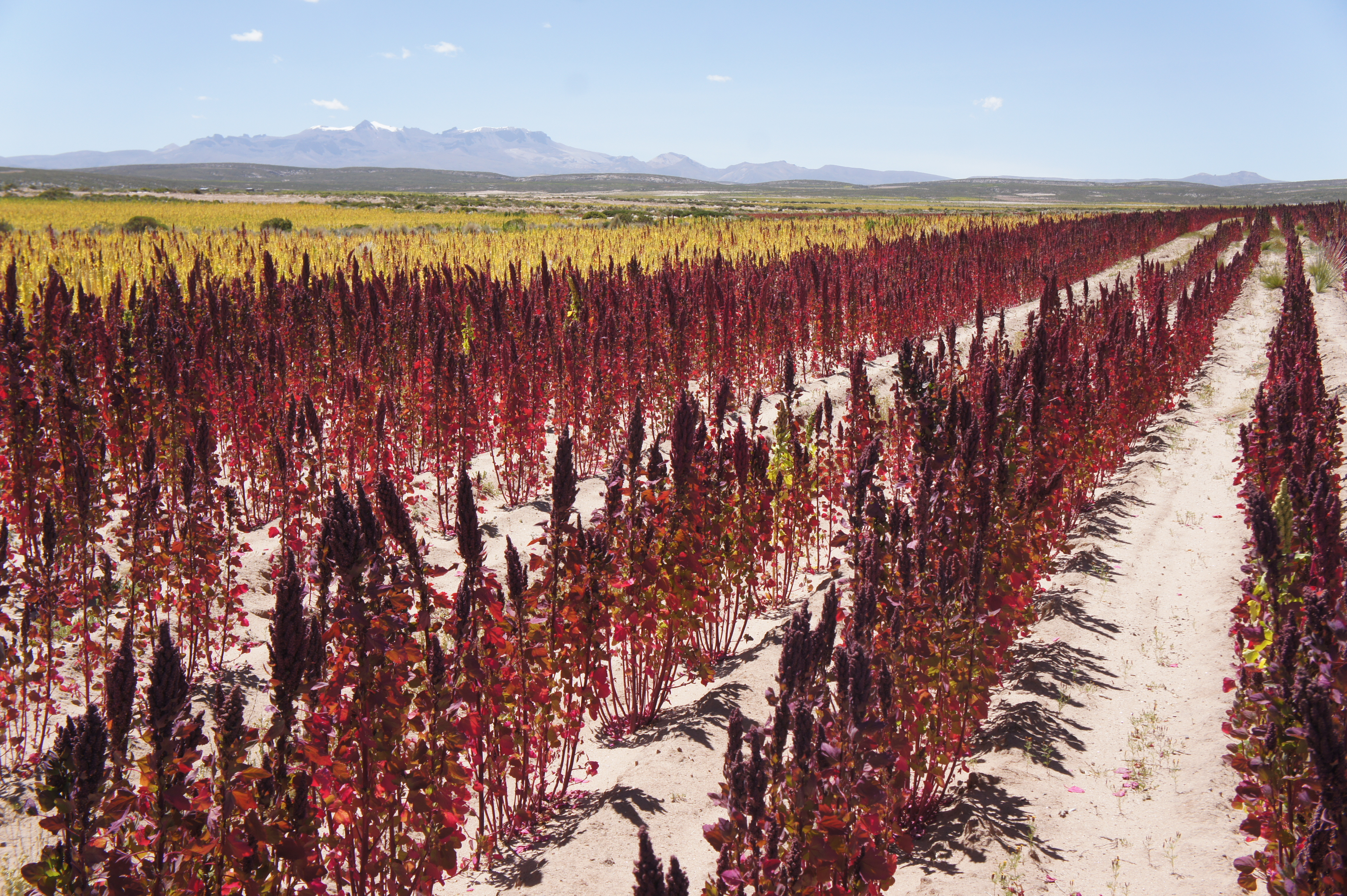
A red quinoa field in Uyuni, Bolivia

Because of the increasing demand for quinoa, some fields in the Andean regions of Bolivia and Peru have become quinoa monocultures. Particularly in the Uyuni salt flats, soil degradation has occurred due to mechanized production and decreased vegetation cover after clearing for quinoa fields. This degradation has led to poorer quinoa yields and lower environmental health in the region.

Signs of desertification of the landscape is amplified by the effects of climate change on quinoa fields and the salt flats. Drier and hotter weather negatively affects quinoa production, while also increasing pest populations attacking quinoa and reducing the nutrient quality of the soil.

Quinoa became a grain of growing interest partially due to its ability to withstand many different climate conditions. Its native Andean region is prone to dry and wet spells, and to cold and hot temperatures. Research shows that quinoa prefers warmer temperatures and alternating irrigation. The randomness of weather conditions due to climate change has hindered development of quinoa crops.

The quinoa boom and bust cycle led to a periodic increased demand for quinoa which originally resulted in increased production in its native area. However, when other countries recognized the economic benefit of producing quinoa, its cultivation in Europe and the United States increased. Some studies indicate that it may be more productive to grow quinoa in the United States, particularly in Washington State, and in China rather than in its native regions.

== Chemistry ==
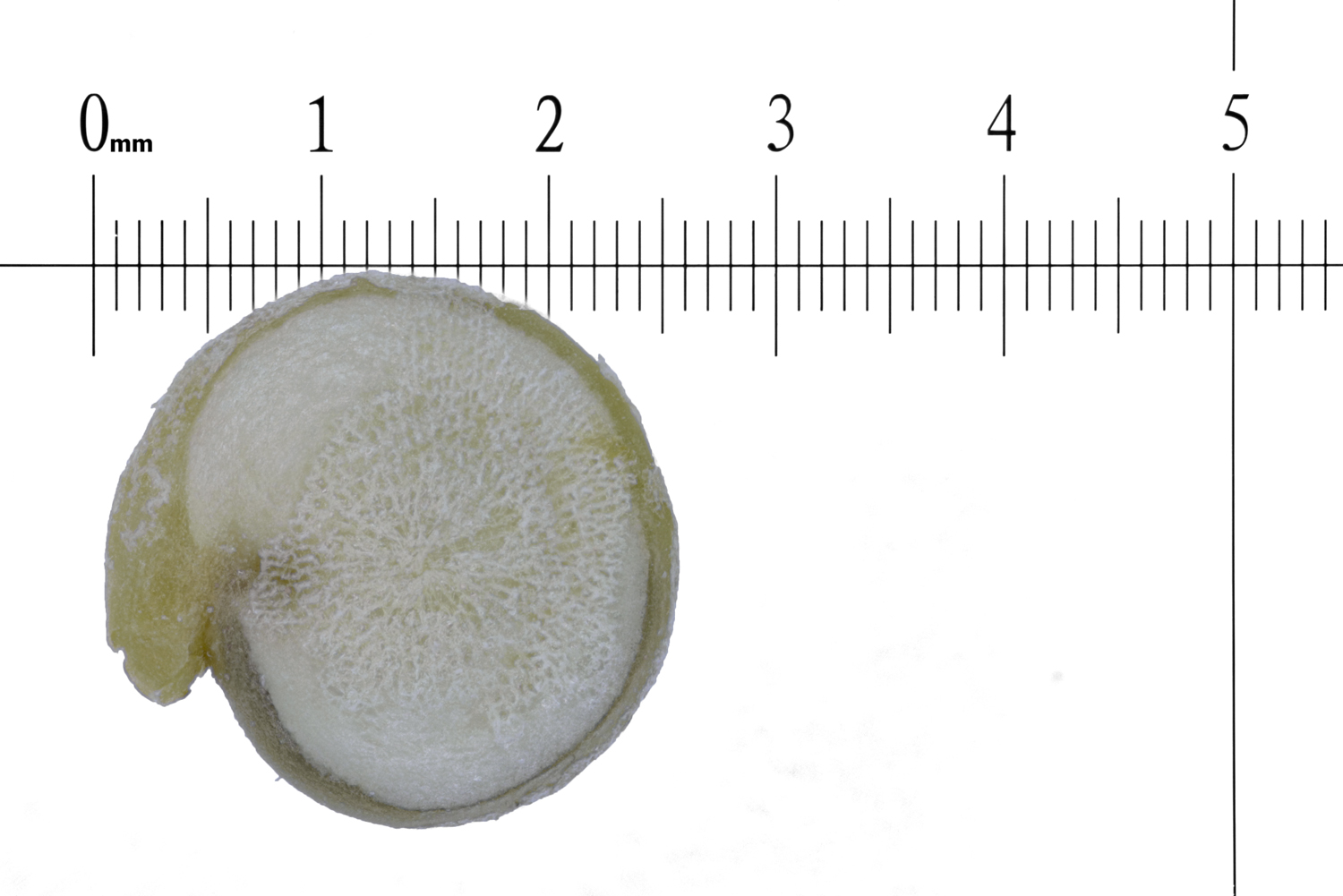
Quinoa seed shown with scale in millimeters

In their natural state, the seeds have a coating that contains bitter-tasting saponins, making them unpalatable. Most of the grain sold commercially has been processed to remove this coating. This bitterness has beneficial effects during cultivation, as it deters birds and, therefore, the plant requires minimal protection. The genetic control of bitterness involves quantitative inheritance. Although lowering the saponin content through selective breeding to produce sweeter, more palatable varieties is complicated by ≈10% cross-pollination, it is a major goal of quinoa breeding programs, which may include genetic engineering.

The toxicity category rating of the saponins in quinoa treats them as mild eye and respiratory irritants and as a low gastrointestinal irritant. In South America, these saponins have many uses, including as a detergent for clothing and washing, and as a folk medicine antiseptic for skin injuries.

Additionally, the leaves and stems of all species of the genus Chenopodium and related genera of the family Amaranthaceae, including quinoa, contain high levels of oxalic acid.

== Uses ==
Quinoa, uncooked
Nutritional value per 100 g (3.5 oz)
- Energy: 1,539 kJ (368 kcal)
- Carbohydrates: 64.2 g
- Dietary fibre: 7.0 g
- Fat: 6.1 g
- Monounsaturated: 1.6 g
- Polyunsaturated: 3.3 g
- Protein: 14.1 g
Vitamins and minerals
Vitamins	Quantity %DV^{†}
Vitamin A equiv.	0% 1 μg
Thiamine (B1)	30% 0.36 mg
Riboflavin (B2)	25% 0.32 mg
Niacin (B3)	10% 1.52 mg
Vitamin B6	29% 0.49 mg
Folate (B9)	46% 184 μg
Choline	13% 70 mg
Vitamin C	0% 0 mg
Vitamin E	16% 2.4 mg
Minerals	Quantity %DV^{†}
Calcium	4% 47 mg
Copper	66% 0.590 mg
Iron	26% 4.6 mg
Magnesium	47% 197 mg
Manganese	87% 2.0 mg
Phosphorus	37% 457 mg
Potassium	19% 563 mg
Selenium	15% 8.5 μg
Sodium	0% 5 mg
Zinc	28% 3.1 mg
- Other constituents: Quantity
- Water: 13.3 g
- Link to USDA Database entry
- ^{†}Percentages estimated using US recommendations for adults, except for potassium, which is estimated based on expert recommendation from the National Academies.

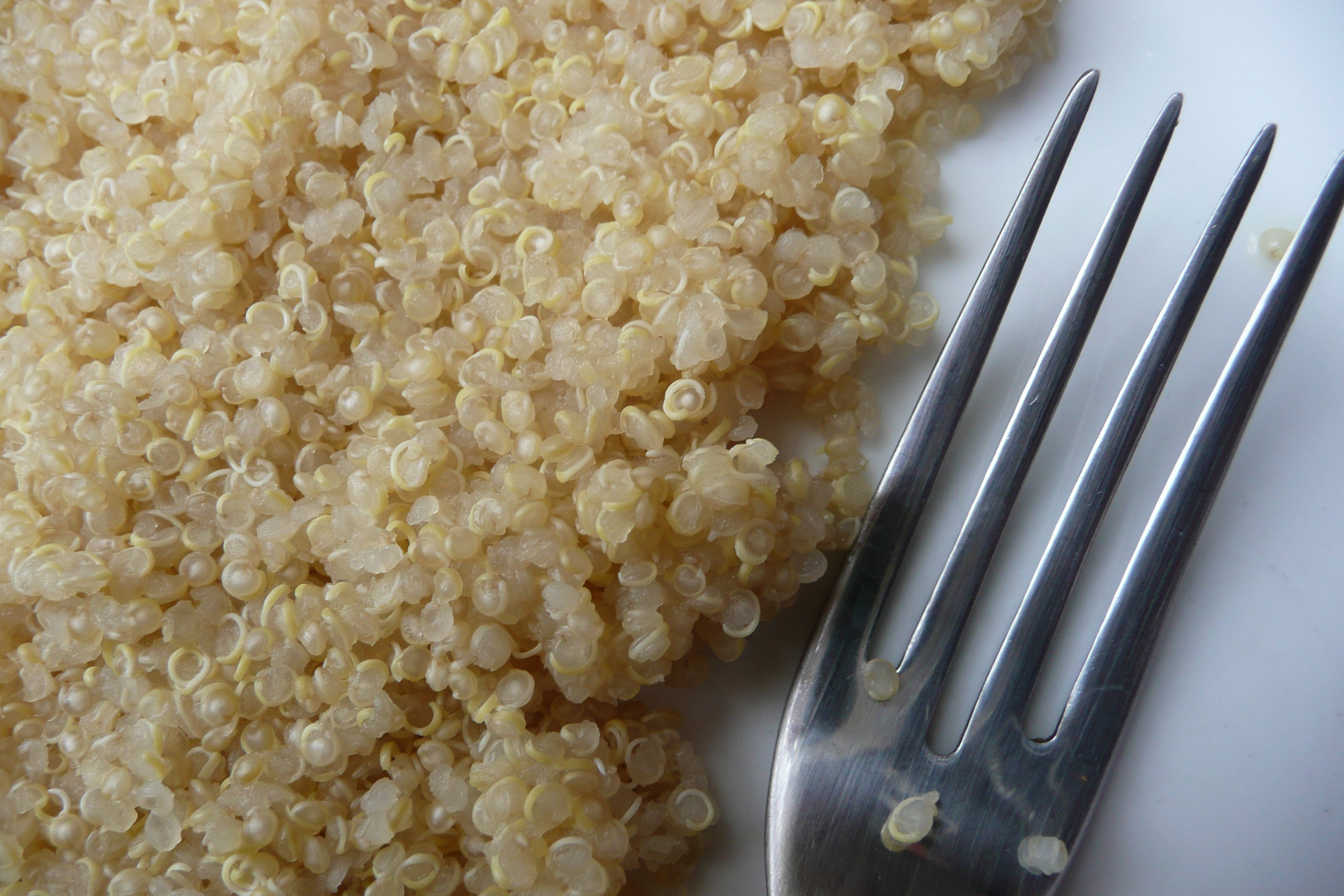
Quinoa is typically cooked by boiling it in water or broth until the grains become tender

The increasing demand for quinoa is partially due to the attention it received as a food that may help alleviate food insecurity in some world regions. Quinoa is high in protein, which makes it a possible alternative to meat for vegetarians and vegans, and for people who are lactose intolerant. It also has high concentrations of dietary minerals. Quinoa does not contain gluten. Some studies suggest that consuming quinoa may help improve early indicators of type 2 diabetes. Some of these qualities may have improved the market to economically privileged people in North America, possibly increasing the price of quinoa.

Quinoa is an important food for the Indigenous people of the Andean Altiplano, especially the Aymara and Quechua communities. Historically, it was consumed as a subsistence food, which was devalued by the Spanish when they colonized the region.

For the Indigenous communities, growing quinoa represented food security and well-being, and it was involved in almost every meal of the day.

=== Nutrition ===
Quinoa, cooked
Nutritional value per 100 g (3.5 oz)
- Energy: 503 kJ (120 kcal)
- Carbohydrates: 21.3 g
- Dietary fibre: 2.8 g
- Fat: 1.92 g
- Monounsaturated: 0.529 g
- Polyunsaturated: 1.078 g
- Protein: 4.4 g
Vitamins and minerals
Vitamins	Quantity %DV^{†}
Vitamin A equiv.	0% 0 μg
Thiamine (B1)	9% 0.107 mg
Riboflavin (B2)	8% 0.11 mg
Niacin (B3)	3% 0.412 mg
Vitamin B6	7% 0.123 mg
Folate (B9)	11% 42 μg
Choline	4% 23 mg
Vitamin C	0% 0 mg
Vitamin E	4% 0.63 mg
Minerals	Quantity %DV^{†}
Calcium	1% 17 mg
Copper	21% 0.192 mg
Iron	8% 1.49 mg
Magnesium	15% 64 mg
Manganese	27% 0.631 mg
Phosphorus	12% 152 mg
Potassium	6% 172 mg
Selenium	5% 2.8 μg
Sodium	0% 7 mg
Zinc	10% 1.09 mg
- Other constituents: Quantity
- Water: 72 g
- Link to USDA Database entry
- ^{†}Percentages estimated using US recommendations for adults, except for potassium, which is estimated based on expert recommendation from the National Academies.

Raw, uncooked quinoa is 13% water, 64% carbohydrates, 14% protein, and 6% fat. Nutritional evaluations indicate that a 100 g (3 1/2 oz) serving of raw quinoa seeds has a food energy of 1,539 kJ (368 kcal) and is a rich source (20% or higher of the Daily Value, DV) of protein, dietary fiber, several B vitamins, including 46% DV for folate, and for several dietary minerals such as magnesium (55% DV), manganese (95% DV), phosphorus (65% DV), and zinc (33% DV).

After boiling, which is the typical preparation for eating the seeds, many nutritional evaluations change. Although a 100 g (3 1/2 oz) serving of cooked quinoa increases to 72% water, most nutritional evaluations are reduced, such as, 21% carbohydrates, 4% protein, and 2% fat, and the food energy of cooked quinoa is reduced to 503 kJ (120 kcal). Although similarly reduced, cooked quinoa remains a rich source of the dietary minerals manganese (30% DV) and phosphorus (22% DV). However, cooked quinoa is reduced to being a moderate source (10–19% DV) of dietary fiber and folate (11%), as well as of the dietary minerals iron (11%), magnesium (18%), and zinc (11%).

Quinoa is gluten-free. Because quinoa has a high concentration of protein and is a good source of many micronutrients, has versatility in preparation, and a potential for increased yields in controlled environments, it has been selected as an experimental crop in NASA's Controlled Ecological Life Support System for long-duration human occupied space flights.

== In culture ==
=== United Nations recognition ===
The United Nations General Assembly declared 2013 as the "International Year of Quinoa", in recognition of the ancestral practices of the Andean people, who have preserved it as a food for present and future generations, through knowledge and practices of living in harmony with nature. The objective was to draw the world's attention to the role that quinoa could play in providing food security, nutrition and poverty eradication in support of achieving Millennium Development Goals. Some academic commentary emphasized that quinoa production could have ecological and social drawbacks in its native regions, and that these problems needed to be tackled.

=== Kosher certification ===
Quinoa is used in the Jewish community as a substitute for the leavened grains that are forbidden during the Passover holiday. Several kosher certification organizations refuse to certify it as being kosher for Passover, citing reasons including its resemblance to prohibited grains or fear of cross-contamination of the product from nearby fields of prohibited grain or during packaging. However, in December 2013 the Orthodox Union, the world's largest kosher certification agency, announced it would begin certifying quinoa as kosher for Passover.

== Gallery ==
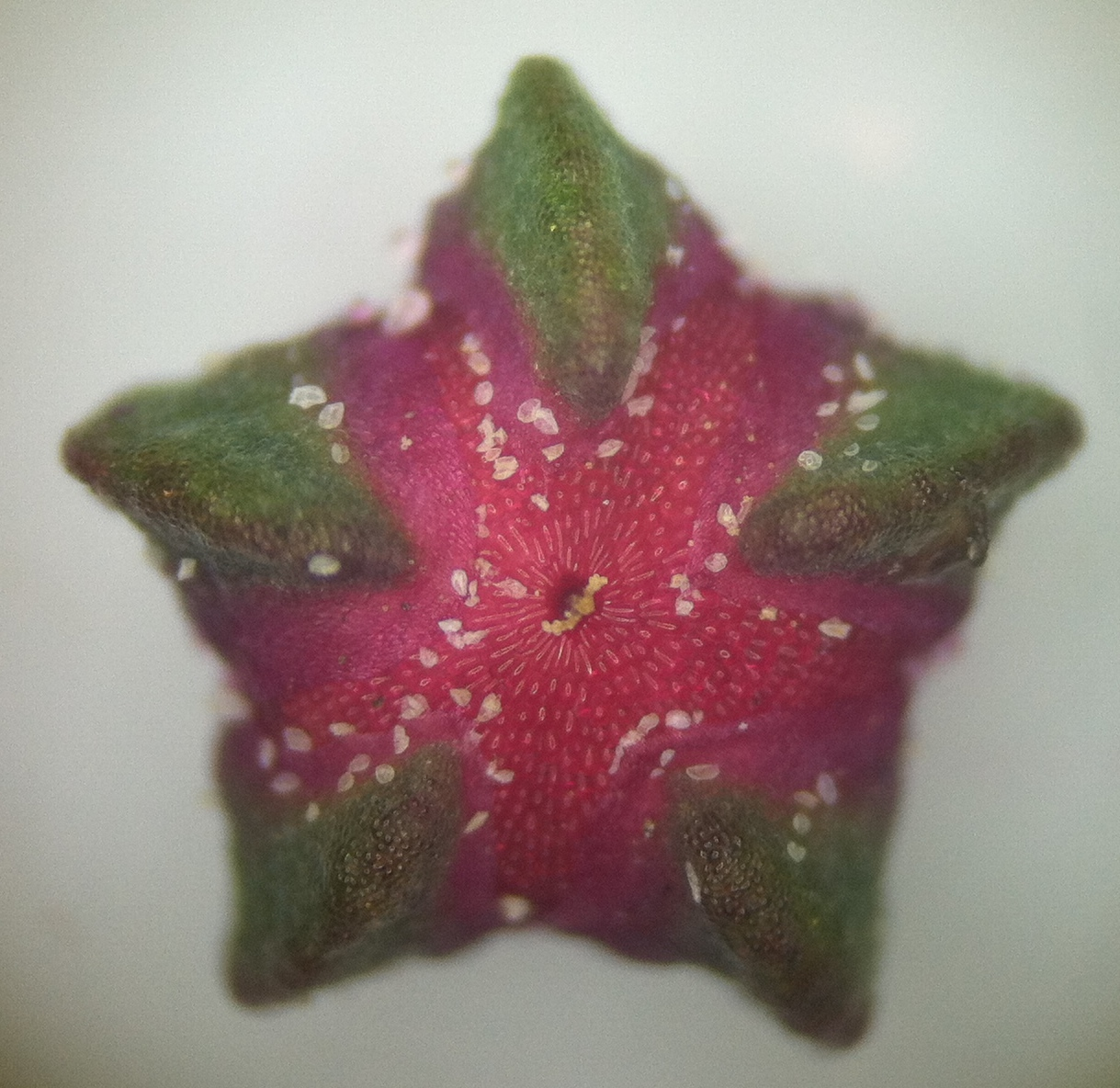
Developing black quinoa seed

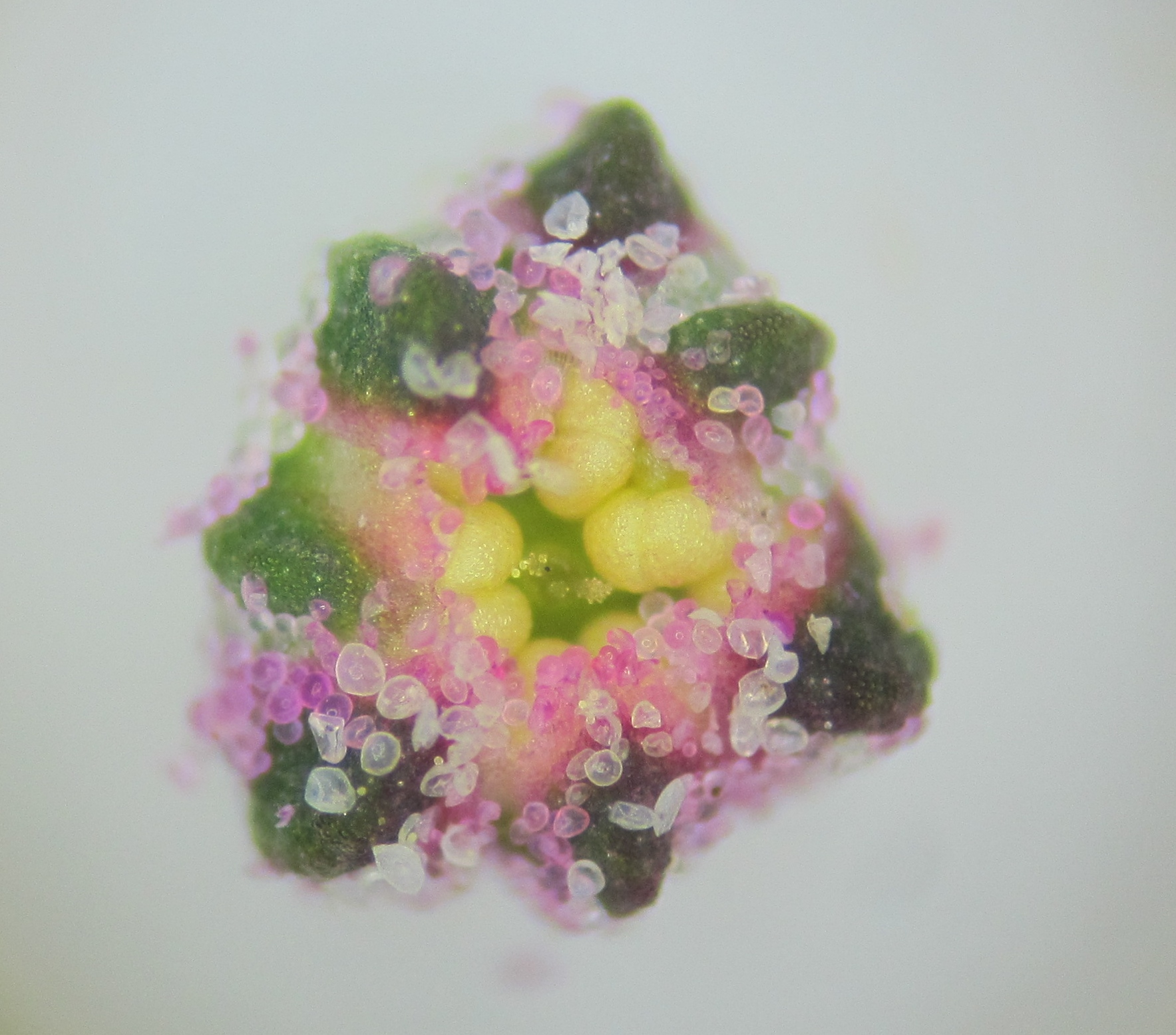
Quinoa flower

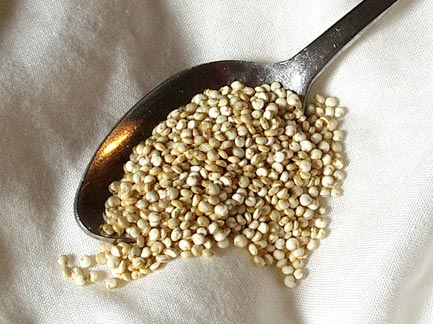
Quinoa seeds

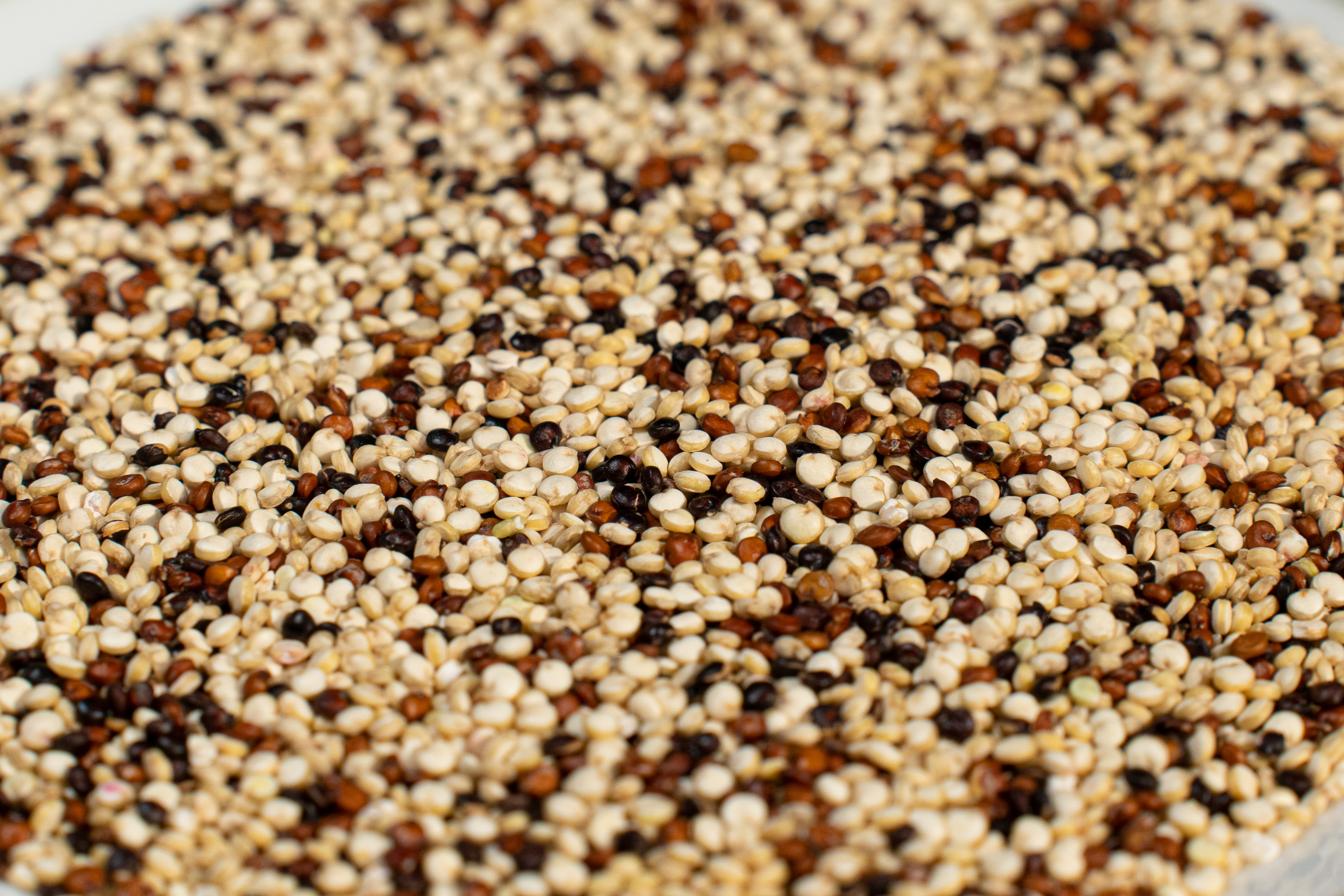
White, red, and black quinoa mix

== See also ==
- List of cereals
- 2010s in food
- Kiwicha
- Chia

== Bibliography ==
- Bailly A (1935). Dictionnaire Grec Francais [Greek - French dictionary] (in French). Vol. 1. Hachette.
- Cumo C (2013). Encyclopedia of Cultivated Plants. Santa Barbara, California: Bloomsbury Publishing. ISBN 978-1-59884-775-8.
- Linné Cv, Willdenow KL (1797). Species Plantarum (4. ed.). Berlin: G. C. Nauk. doi:10.5962/bhl.title.37657. Archived from the original on 2 June 2018.
- Itier C (1997). Parlons quechua - La langue du Cuzco (in French). Paris: Ed. l' Harmattan. ISBN 2-7384-5602-2.
- Murphy KS, Matanguihan J (28 September 2015). Quinoa: Improvement and Sustainable Production. John Wiley & Sons. ISBN 978-1-118-62805-8.
- Pardo B O, Pizarro JL (2014). Chile: Plantas alimentarias Prehispánicas (in Spanish) (2015 ed.). Arica, Chile: Ediciones Parina. pp. 146–150. ISBN 978-956-9120-02-2.
- Rey A (2006). Dictionnaire historique de la langue française (Vol I, II) [Historical dictionary of the French language] (in French). Paris: Dictionnaires le Robert. ISBN 2-84902-236-5.
