= Lake Aricota =

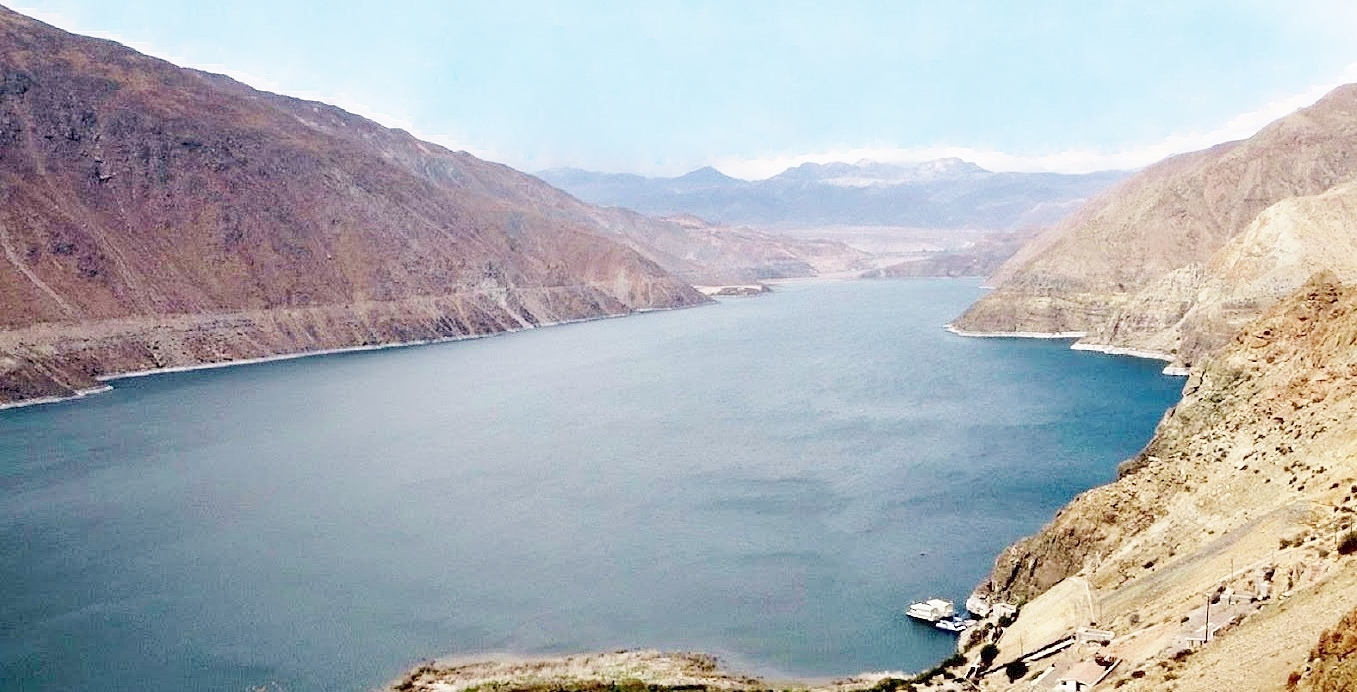

- Location within Peru
- Location: Candarave Province, Tacna Region, Peru
- Coordinates: 17°21′36″S 70°17′37″W
- Type: Landslide lake
- Primary inflows: Callazas River, Jaruma Creek
- Primary outflows: Curibaya River
- Basin countries: Peru
- Water volume: 140 cubic kilometres (34 cu mi)
- Surface elevation: 2,800 metres (9,186 ft)

Lake Aricota (possibly from Aymara ari pointed, sharp, quta lake) is a lake in Candarave Province, region of Tacna, Peru. It has an elevation of 2,800 metres (9,186 ft) above sea level.

== Geography ==
The lake originated when debris flows in steep canyon walls dammed the Callazas River. The waters of the lake are currently diverted to a hydroelectric plant, which has lowered the lake level from about 800,000 cubic metres (650 acre⋅ft) in 1967 to a monthly average of 140,000 cubic metres (110 acre⋅ft) in 2000. The main inflow sources of the lake are the Callazas River and the Jaruma creek. The main outflow is due to seepage through the debris dam to the Curibaya River (although hydroelectric use could count also).

The waters of Lake Aricota have a high arsenic content as the waters of Callazas River and Salado River (a tributary of Jaruma Creek) pass through the Yucamane volcanic area.

== See also ==
- List of lakes in Peru
