= Lake Pomacanchi =

Lake in Peru

- Location within Peru
- Location: Acopia District, Peru
- Coordinates: 14.001944°S 71.544444°W
- Basin countries: Peru

Lake Pomacanchi is a lake in Peru.

== See also ==
- List of lakes in Peru
