= Lake Imiria =

Lake in Ucayali, Peru

- Location within Peru
- Location: Ucayali Region
- Coordinates: 8.865°S 74.310°W
- Basin countries: Peru
- Max. length: 22 km (14 mi)
- Max. width: 0.6 to 1.5 km (0.37 to 0.93 mi)
- Surface area: 38.14 km^{2} (14.73 sq mi)
- Average depth: 6 to 20 m (20 to 66 ft)
- Surface elevation: 124 m (407 ft)

Lake Imiria is a lake in Peru located in the Masisea District, Coronel Portillo province, Ucayali department. The lake is 200 km (120 mi) southeast of the city of Pucallpa. The lake is known for its dark, yellow-colored waters. The lake is named for the Imiria flower that grows on the shores of the lake. The lake is 6 to 12 m (20 to 39 ft) in depth during the dry season and 14 to 20 m (46 to 66 ft) deep in the wet season.

== See also ==
- List of lakes in Peru
