= Huamachuco =

- Town
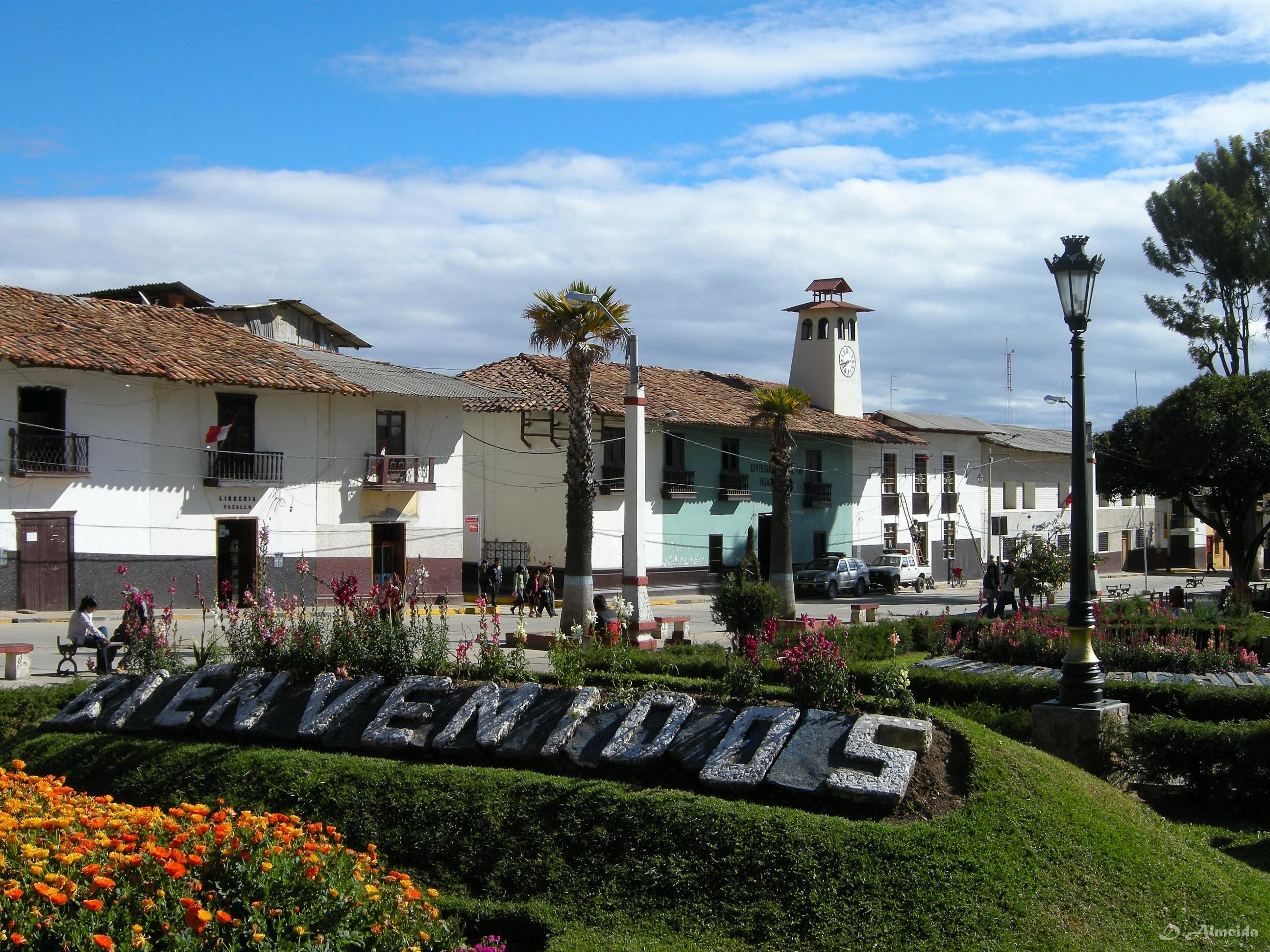

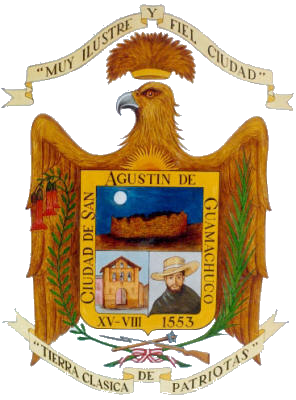
- Flag Seal

- Location within Peru
- Coordinates: 7°48′43.3″S 78°02′55.3″W
- Country: Peru
- Region: La Libertad
- Province: Sánchez Carrión
- District: Huamachuco

Government
  - Mayor: Benito Robert Contreras Morales
- Elevation: 3,169 m (10,397 ft)

Population
  - Estimate (2015): 39,806
- Time zone: UTC-5 (PET)
- Website: Official website

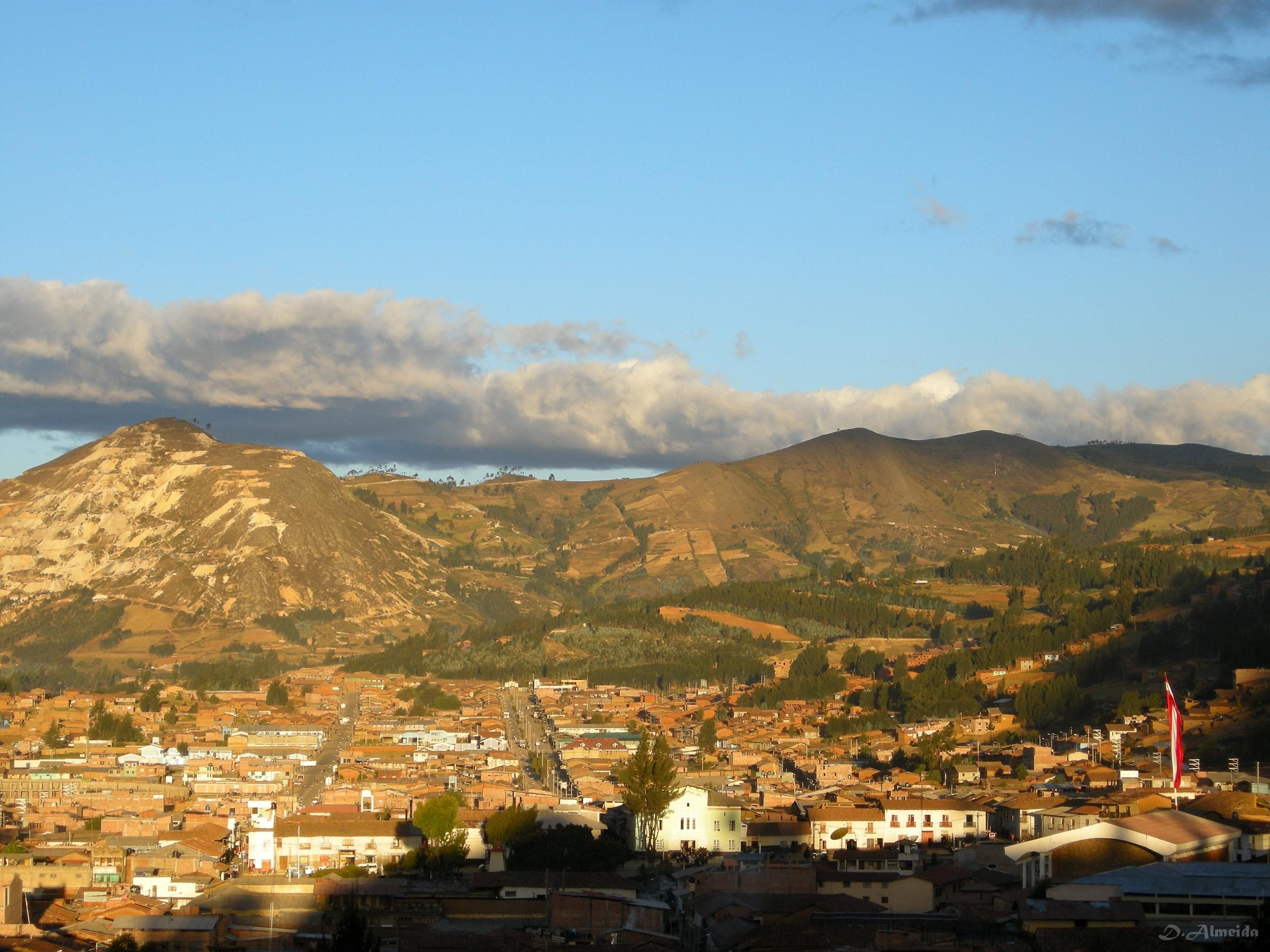
Panoramic view of the city of Huamachuco

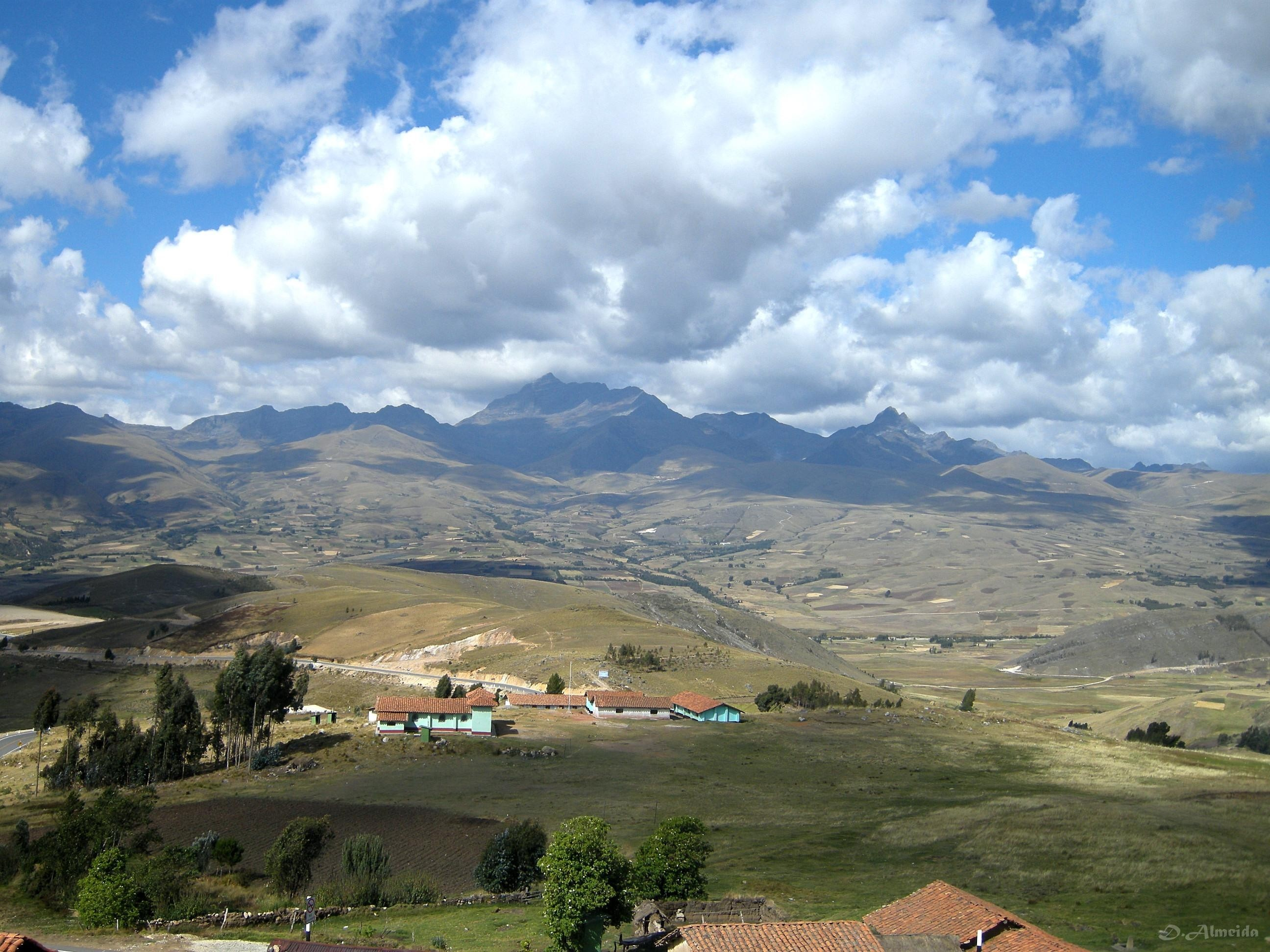
View of the nearby Andes and farmland

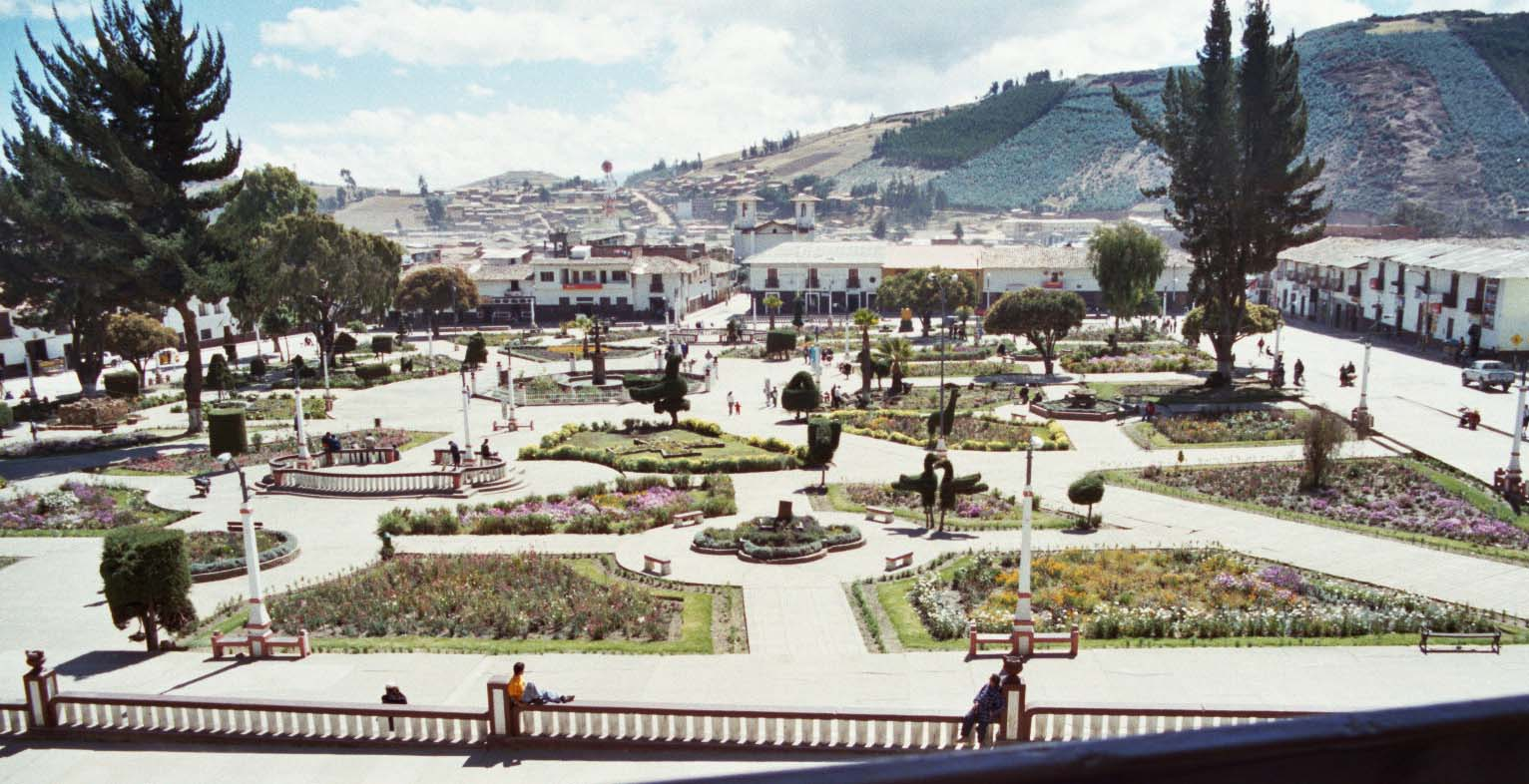
The square Plaza Mayor

Huamachuco (possibly from Quechua waman meaning "falcon" or "variable hawk", and Culli chuco meaning "earth" or "land", thus "land of falcons") is a town in northern Peru and capital of the province of Sánchez Carrión in La Libertad Region. The city is the seat of the Territorial Prelature of Huamachuco. Lake Sausacocha lies to the northeast.

About 48 kilometres (30 mi) away, within the Huamachuco district, is the significant pre-Columbian archeological site of Marcahuamachuco. It is a complex of monuments that are the remnants of a prehistoric political and religious center of a culture that thrived 350 CE–1100 CE. The ruins of a Wari city, Viracochapampa, are located 3.5 km north of Huamachuco. Additionally there are many other pre-Columbian ruins around the town.

== History ==
The area surrounding the town exhibits evidence of early occupation by several ancient Andean civilizations. Prior to the Inca, the area was united under a single political entity referred to as the Señorio de Huamachuco (Huamachuco lordship) by colonial chroniclers, a Culli-speaking polity that had as their main deity the thunder god Catequil, who was an oracle and the principal wak'a of the Huamachucos. Catequil was later incorporated into the official Inca pantheon, whose shrine was located in the center of the Huamachuco territory. Archaeologists have identified the mountain of Cerro Icchal with Catequil (both as the seat of the wak'a and as the wak'a himself), and the ruins of Namanchugo, Catequil's main sanctuary, are situated at the foot of Cerro Icchal. Although it was largely destroyed by Atawallpa and colonial priests, its magnificence and importance was recorded by colonial chroniclers. Catequil was a famous god venerated throughout the northern Peruvian highlands and beyond since pre-Inca times, and pilgrims seeking to find answers were one of the main sources of income to the Huamachucos. The shrine's prosperity is perhaps one of the reasons why the area surrounding Huamachuco does not seem to have been seriously affected, as large parts of the Peruvian highlands were, by the demographic collapse following the Wari state's demise and the end of the Middle Horizon era; rather, population growth appears to be continuous in the area.

Indigenous settlement patterns within the Huamachuco area can be divided into eight phases:

- Colpa phase (? to 900 BC)
- Sausagocha phase (900 – 200 BC)
- Purpucala phase (200 BC – AD 300)
- Early Huamachuco phase (AD 300 – 600)
- Amaru phase (AD 600 – 800?)
- Late Huamachuco phase (AD 800? – 1000)
- Tuscan phase (AD 1000 – 1470)
- Santa Bárbara phase (AD 1470 – 1532).

The penultimate phase, the Tuscan phase, corresponds to the historical autonomous domain of Huamachuco, and the Santa Bárbara phase corresponds to the Inca domination of Huamachuco. The Huamachuco domain or kingdom probably established its capital at Marcahuamachuco, since the ruins of Marcahuamachuco show evident occupation from the Early Huamachuco phase up to the Tuscan phase. Following the Inca conquest, the Marcahuamachuco population was likely resettled where the modern town of Huamachuco stands today.

The modern town of Huamachuco was originally built by the Inca as their main installation in the zone. Huamachuco became the capital seat of an Inca province (wamani) of the same name. The Inca town of Huamachuco does not seem to have been built upon any previous settlement, and the pre-Inca hillfort of Cerro Tuscán, overlooking the town, seems to have been enhanced to protect the Inca settlement. With the Incas came enclaves of settlers called mitmaqkuna and an extensive system of tambos was built in the area, both evidenced by archaeological research. The Inca administrative center of Huamachuco was a stopover on the main Inca highway of Cusco to Quito, the "Qhapaq Ñan" or "Royal Road". The Incas built at least 215 colca storehouses on the hillslopes surrounding the town, with roughly half of these having floors elevated on stone pillars, while the other storerooms have canals running under the floors, probably for tubers.

The Spanish foundation of Huamachuco was made in 1553 by Augustinian missionaries on top of the Incan Huamachuco. During the Peruvian War of Independence, it was named a very illustrious and faithful city by General José de San Martín. During the War of the Pacific, Huamachuco was the scene of the Battle of Huamachuco, which took place on 10 July 1883. In this final episode of the war, troops led by Andrés Avelino Cáceres were defeated by Chilean troops under Colonel Alejandro Gorostiaga.

== Etymology ==
It is not clear whether the name of the city comes from the Culli language, the autochthonous language of the area, or from Quechua, a language from central Peru that reached its heyday during the Inca Empire. Most scholars believe the name to have a mixed origin from both languages. The name Huamachuco can be divided into two words, huama and chuco. It has been postulated that huama comes from the Quechua word waman meaning "falcon", as it has no known meaning in Culli, which is poorly attested and extinct, while chuco is of likely Culli origin, meaning "earth", "land", "region", or "country", being a commonly used term in the toponymy of the region (and alternatively written as chugo). Thus, Huamachuco may mean something like "land of falcons" or "country of falcons". Otherwise, chuco can be translated as "helmet" or "headwear" in Quechua, which would give the city the meaning of "falcon hat", though modern linguists deny that this is the correct meaning of the city's name.

== Geography ==
Huamachuco is located between the eastern and western cordillera of the Andes Mountains, and 100 km south of Cajamarca. It has highland areas that range from 2500 to 4500 meters above sea level. Because of the great elevation, most of Huamachuco's land is treeless. The high-altitude grasslands of this region are known as puna. The Huamachuco highland is bounded on the east and west by two parallel mountain ranges. The puna grasslands are ideal habitats for deer and wild camelids and supported the domestication of alpacas and llamas.

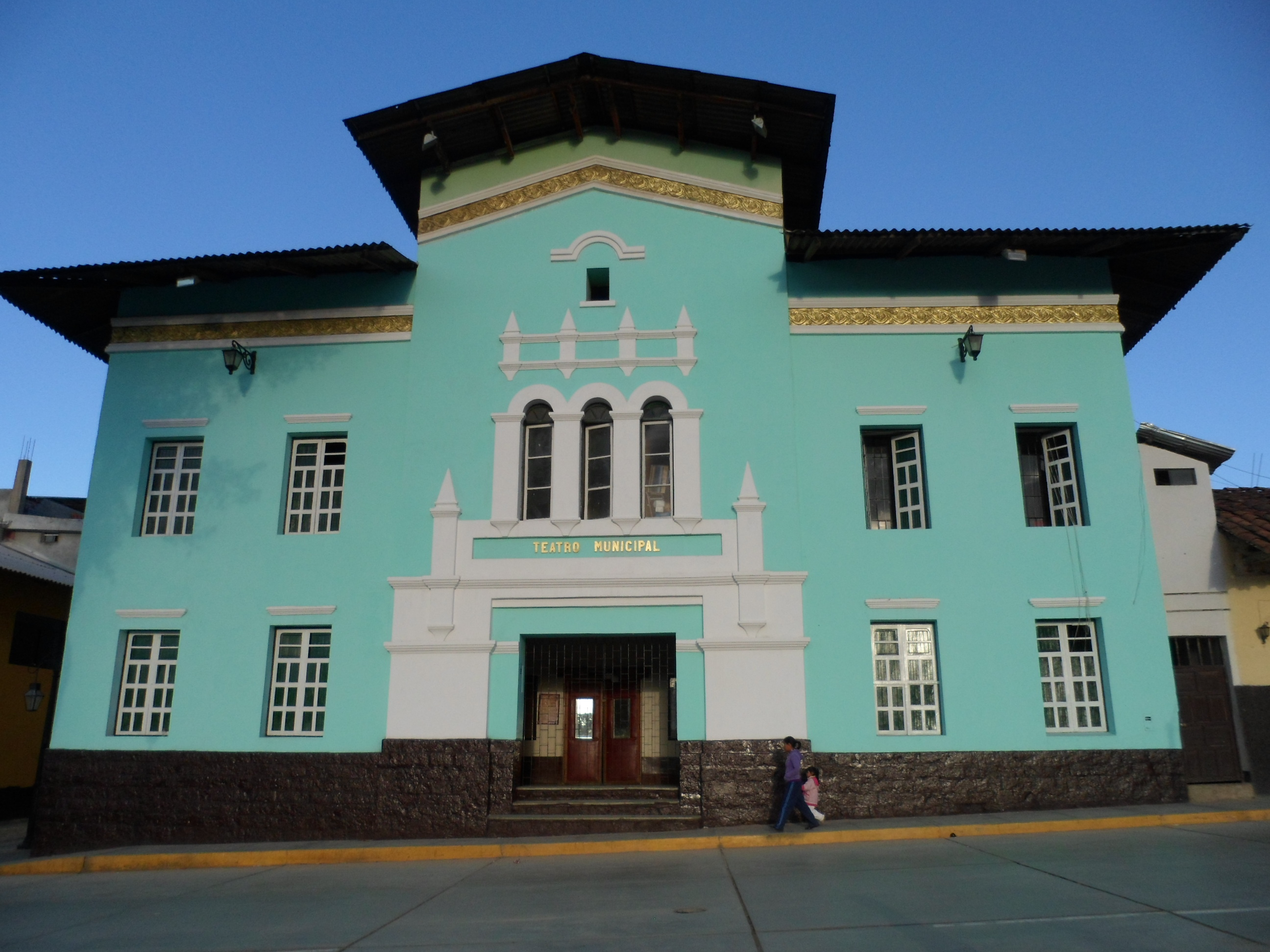
Municipal Theatre, Huamachuco

Huamachuco's deep valley slopes show evidence of deliberate farming of native Andean trees and shrub vegetation. It appears that in prehistoric times, the temperature of the land was slightly warmer than today, allowing agriculture at elevations 100–300 meters higher than is possible in the 20th and 21st centuries.

=== Climate ===
Huamachuco has a subtropical highland climate (Köppen: Cwb) with consistently cool temperatures. Huamachuco has a dry season from June to August.

Climate data for Huamachuco, elevation 3,186 m (10,453 ft), (1991–2020)
Month	Jan	Feb	Mar	Apr	May	Jun	Jul	Aug	Sep	Oct	Nov	Dec	Year
Mean daily maximum °C (°F)	18.3 (64.9)	18.0 (64.4)	17.6 (63.7)	18.3 (64.9)	18.7 (65.7)	18.6 (65.5)	18.7 (65.7)	19.2 (66.6)	19.5 (67.1)	19.1 (66.4)	19.0 (66.2)	18.4 (65.1)	18.6 (65.5)
Mean daily minimum °C (°F)	7.6 (45.7)	8.0 (46.4)	8.0 (46.4)	7.6 (45.7)	6.8 (44.2)	5.8 (42.4)	5.4 (41.7)	5.7 (42.3)	6.8 (44.2)	7.1 (44.8)	6.5 (43.7)	7.3 (45.1)	6.9 (44.4)
Average precipitation mm (inches)	118.2 (4.65)	145.0 (5.71)	176.4 (6.94)	97.1 (3.82)	50.3 (1.98)	16.6 (0.65)	10.0 (0.39)	11.5 (0.45)	38.8 (1.53)	102.9 (4.05)	96.4 (3.80)	135.6 (5.34)	998.8 (39.31)
Source: National Meteorology and Hydrology Service of Peru

== Banks ==
- Branch of Caja Trujillo
- Branch of Nuestra Gente
- Branch of Banco de la Nación
- Branch of Caja Piura

== See also ==
- Feast of Saint Francis
- Marcahuamachuco
- La Libertad Region
- Racing de Huamachuco
- Trujillo, Peru
