= Lake Chauya =

Lake in Peru

- Location within Peru
- Location: Ucayali Region
- Coordinates: 8°57′44″S 74°14′59″W
- Basin countries: Peru

Lake Chauya or Chioa is a lake in the Ucayali Region of Peru. It lies several kilometres east of the flow of the Ucayali River.

== See also ==
- List of lakes in Peru
