= Huangacocha =

Lake in Peru

- Location within Peru
- Location: La Libertad Region
- Coordinates: 7°56′0″S 78°3′0″W
- Basin countries: Peru

Huangacocha (possibly from Quechua wanka, wank'a, wankha rock, stone, qucha lake, "rock lake") or Huangagocha, is a lake in the La Libertad Region in Peru.

== See also ==
- List of lakes in Peru
