= List of lakes of Peru =

The following is a list of lakes in Peru. Many of the names have the ending -cocha, from Quechua qucha: lake.

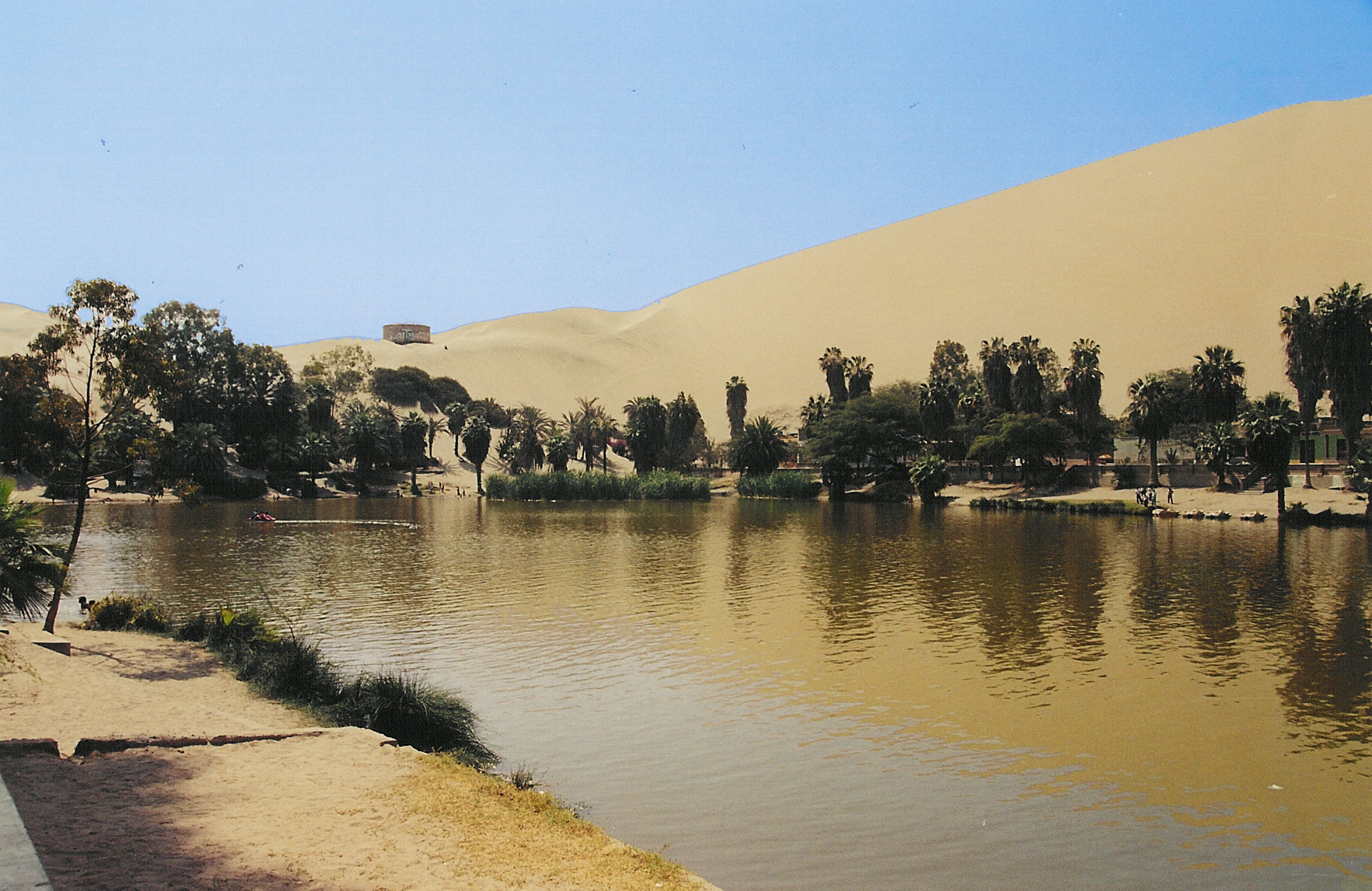
Huacachina

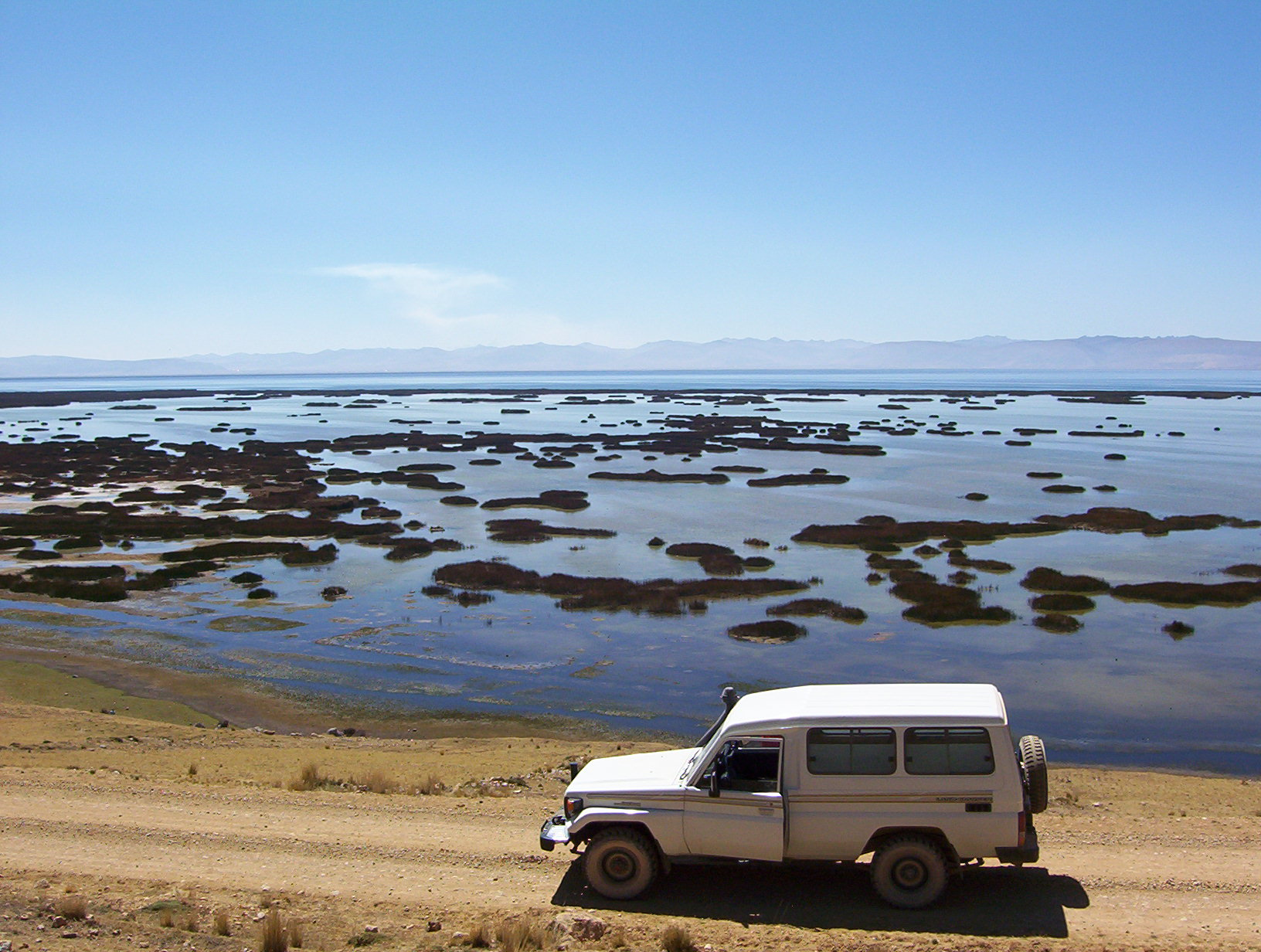
Junín

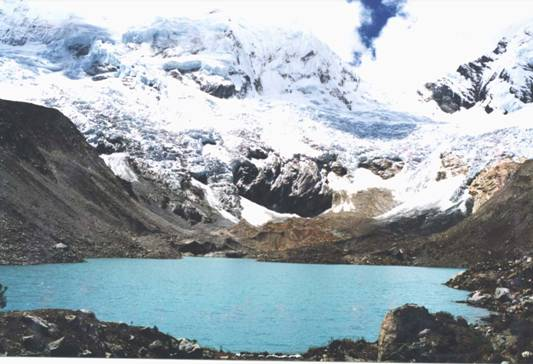
Palcacocha

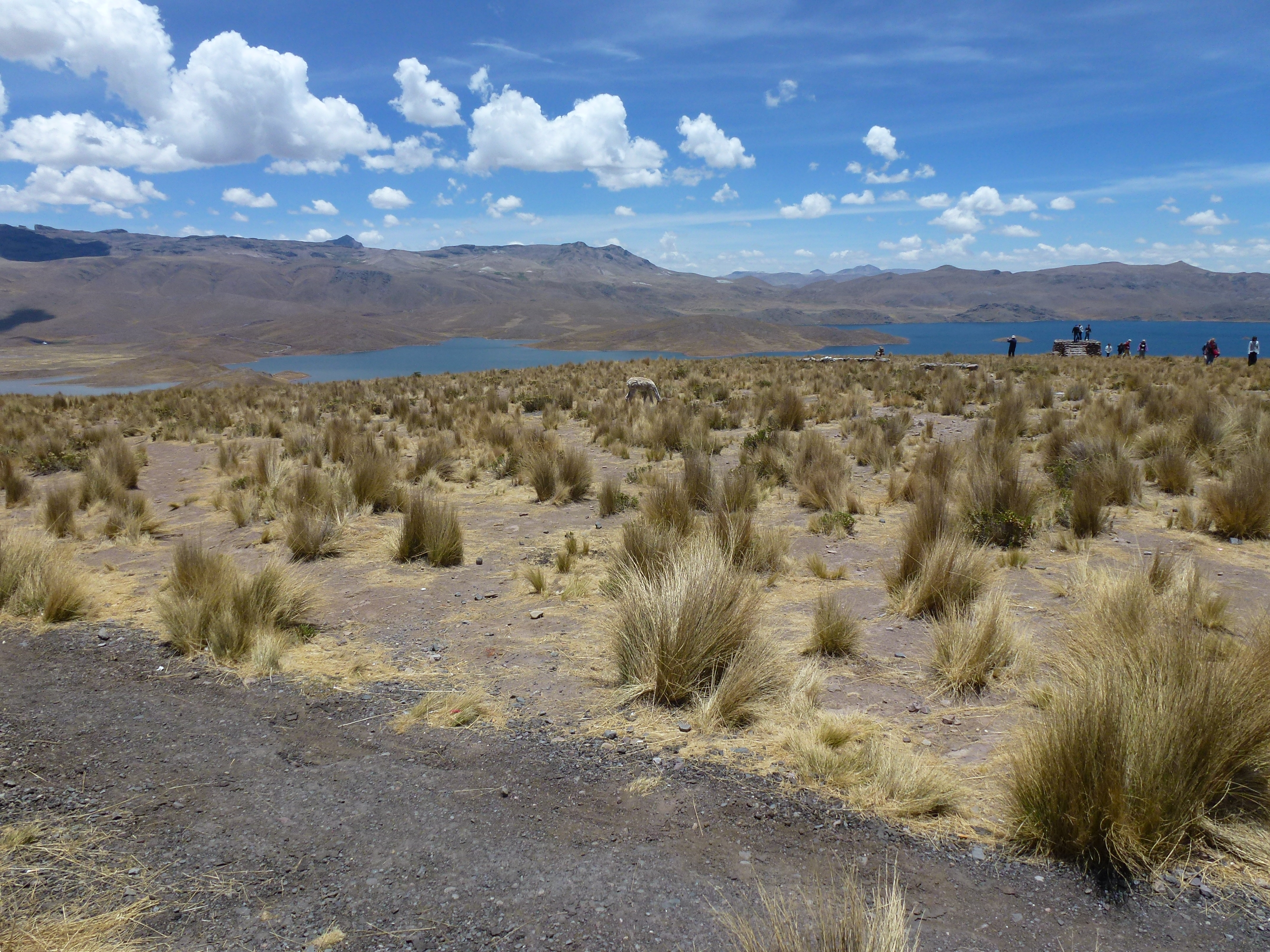
Lagunillas

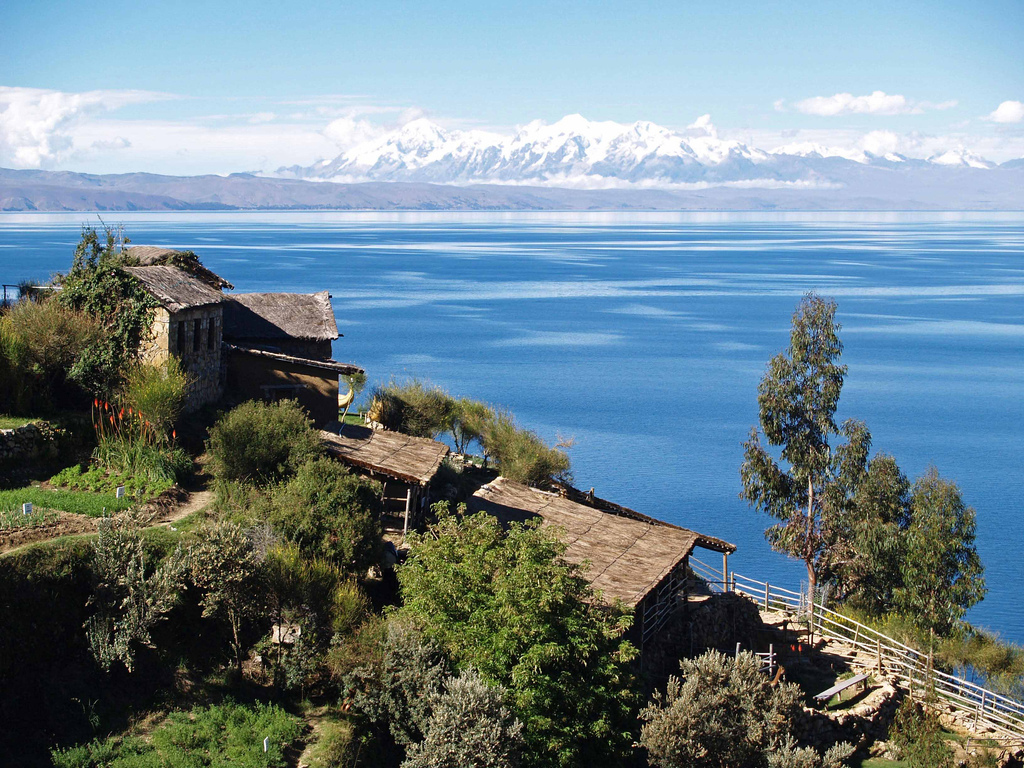
Titicaca

- Acucocha
- Alcacocha
- Arapa
- Aricoma
- Aricota
- Belaunde
- Carpa
- Chauya
- Choclococha
- Huacachina
- Imiria
- Jucumarini
- Junin
- Quishuar Lakes
- Langui Layo
- Lagunillas
- Lauricocha
- Loriscota
- Llanganuco Lakes
- Marcapomacocha
- Mucurca
- Palcacocha
- Paca
- Pacucha
- Parinacochas
- Parón
- Paucarcocha
- Pelagatos
- Pías
- Pomacanchi
- Pumacocha
- Punrun
- Querococha
- Conococha
- Colorcocha
- Rimachi
- Salinas
- Sandoval
- Saracocha
- Sausacocha
- Sauce
- Shegue
- Sibinacocha
- Suches
- Titicaca
- Tragadero
- Umayo
- Orcococha
- Valencia
- Vizcacha
- Huangacocha
- Huarmicocha
- Huaroncocha
- Huascacocha
- Huichicocha
- Vilacota
- Huiñaymarca
- Yanawayin
- Yanaqucha

== See also ==
- List of lakes
- List of lakes by area
- List of lakes by depth
- List of lakes by volume
