= Lake Punrun =

Lake in Peru

- Location within Peru
- Location: Pasco Region
- Coordinates: 10.845°S 76.488°W
- Basin countries: Peru
- Surface area: 8.33 square kilometres (3.22 sq mi)
- Max. depth: 200 metres (660 ft)

Lake Punrun is a lake in Peru.

== See also ==
- List of lakes in Peru
