= Lake Shegue =

Lake in Peru

- Location within Peru
- Location: Pasco Region
- Coordinates: 11.021111°S 76.475°W
- Basin countries: Peru

Lake Shegue is a lake in the Pasco Region of Peru.

== See also ==
- List of lakes in Peru
