= Lake Rimachi =

Lake in Loreto, Peru

- Location within Peru

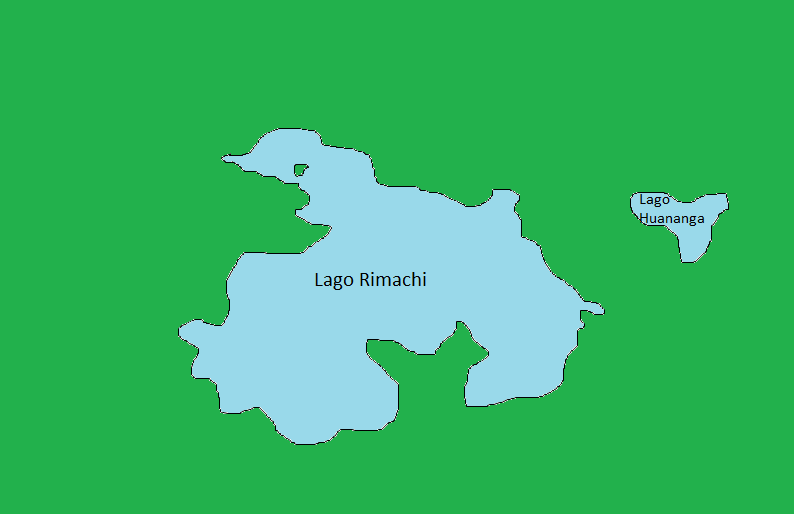
- Location: Loreto, Peru
- Coordinates: 4°25′S 76°43′W
- Primary inflows: Chapuli River
- Primary outflows: Rimachi River
- Basin countries: Peru
- Surface area: 3 km^{2} (1.2 sq mi)

Lake Rimachi (Lago Rimachi in Spanish) is a lake in northern Peru in the Amazon rainforest of about 300 hectares (1 sq mi) of extension. It is located on the western banks of Pastaza River, being its main inflow source the Chapuli River, and its main outflow the Rimachi River. The lands around the lake were home to the Murato people, who are now extinct.

== See also ==
- List of lakes in Peru
