= Lake Belaunde =

Lake in Peru

Lake
- Sulla Qucha
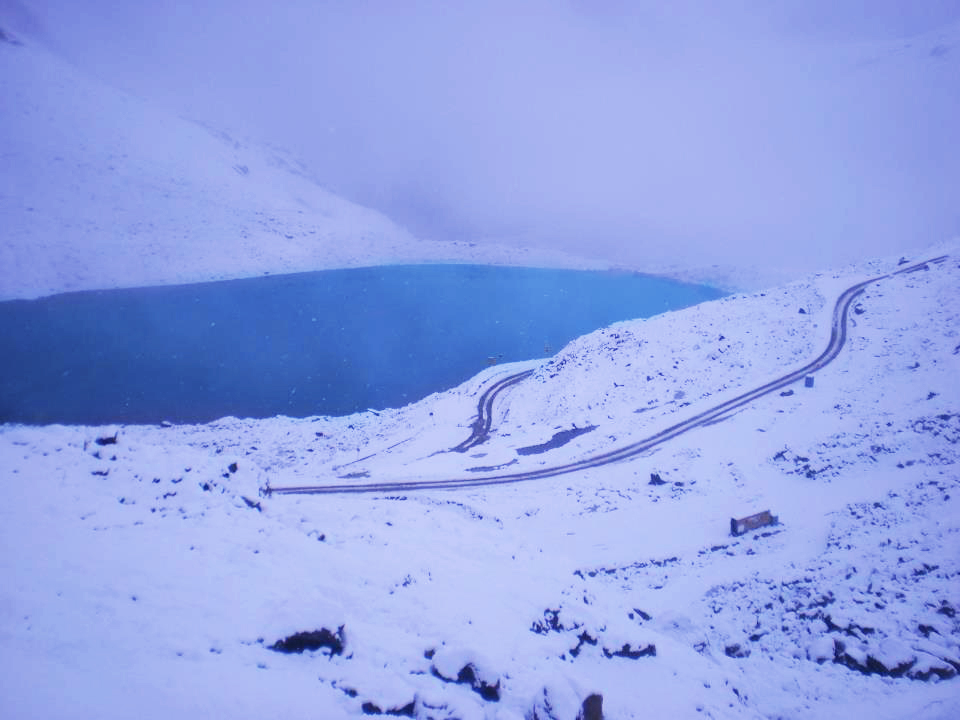
- View of the lake from route AN-107

- Location within Peru
- Location: Chacas, Ancash Region, Peru
- Coordinates: 9°08′18″S 77°30′18″W
- Type: glacial
- Primary inflows: melting ice from nearby snow peaks
- Primary outflows: Putaqa River
- Basin countries: Peru
- Max. length: 360 m (1,180 ft)
- Max. width: 130 m (430 ft)
- Average depth: 7 m (23 ft)
- Max. depth: 15 m (49 ft)
- Surface elevation: 4,500 m (14,800 ft)
- Islands: none
- Settlements: none

Lake Belaunde (Quechua: Sulla Qucha), is a natural reservoir of fresh water located in the district of Chacas, Ancash, in the area of the Cordillera Blanca at 4500 meters. It originated from the deglaciation of glacier Yanarahu in 1968. It was renamed in honor of former President Fernando Belaunde Terry, who supported the construction of the AN-107 Route, which runs along its banks south and east.

Lake Belaunde is the smallest of the group of three lagoons that are located in the basin of river Putaqa. It's one of the most accessible areas of the province.

== Bibliography ==
- Municipalidad Provincial de Asunción. (2007). Plan vial provincial participativo de Asunción, 2007-2011 (PDF). Archived from the original (PDF) on 2018-10-04.

== See also ==
- List of lakes of Peru
