= Lake Carpa =

Lake in Peru

- Location within Peru
- Location: Lima Region, Huarochirí Province, Huanza District
- Coordinates: 11°32′4″S 76°22′38″W
- Basin countries: Peru

Lake Carpa is a lake in Peru, located northeast of Arahuay in Huanza District, Huarochiri Province, Lima Region.

== See also ==
- List of lakes in Peru
