= Lake Valencia (Peru) =

Lake Valencia, Peru
- Location within Peru
- Location: Madre de Dios Region
- Coordinates: 12.446165°S 68.818337°W
- Type: Oxbow Lake
- Basin countries: Peru

Lake Valencia, Peru is an oxbow lake formed by the Madre de Dios River in Peru's Madre de Dios Region. It is situated near the Bolivian border and its closest city is Puerto Maldonado.

== See also ==
- List of lakes in Peru
