= Quishuar Lakes =

Lake in Peru

- Location within Peru
- Location: La Libertad Region
- Coordinates: 7.600278°S 77.53°W
- Basin countries: Peru

The Quishuar Lakes (possibly from Quechua: Kiswar quchakuna) are a group of lakes in the La Libertad Region in Peru.

== See also ==
- List of lakes in Peru
