= Lake Tragadero =

Lake in Peru

- Laguna Tragadero (Spanish)
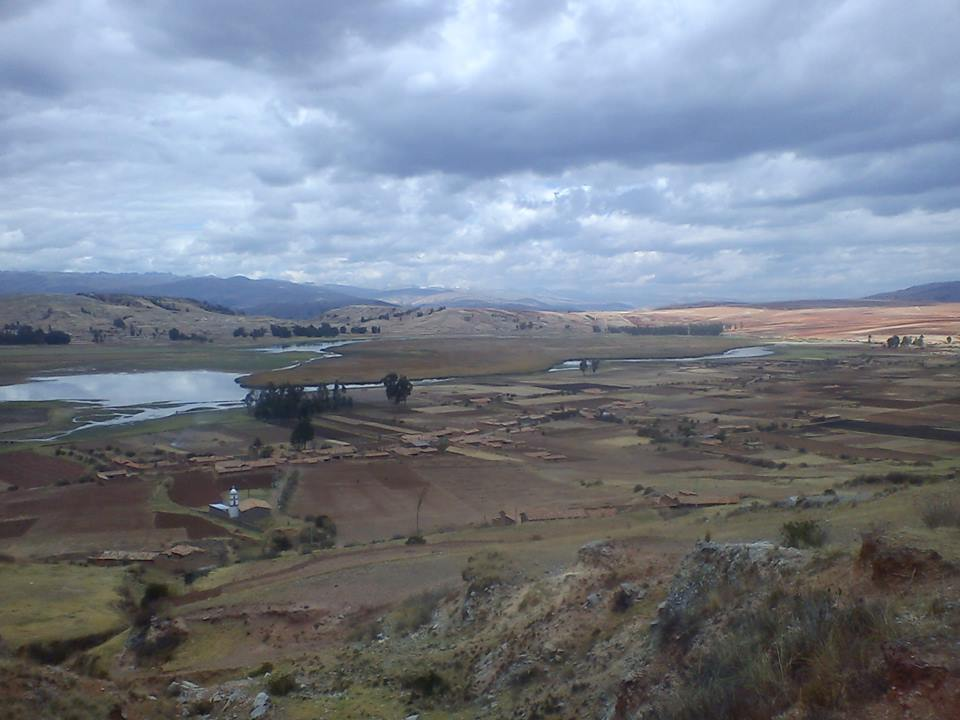
- Lake Tragadero

- Location within Peru
- Location: Junín Region
- Coordinates: 11.764167°S 75.541667°W
- Basin countries: Peru
- Surface elevation: 3,818 m (12,526 ft)

Lake Tragadero (Spanish: "Laguna Tragadero") is a lake in the Junín Region in Peru.

The area has dry winters and warm summers and can be sensitive to seismic activities.

The nearest city is Jauja, the main city of Jauja Province.

== See also ==
- List of lakes in Peru
