= Huamachuco District =

Huamachuco
- District
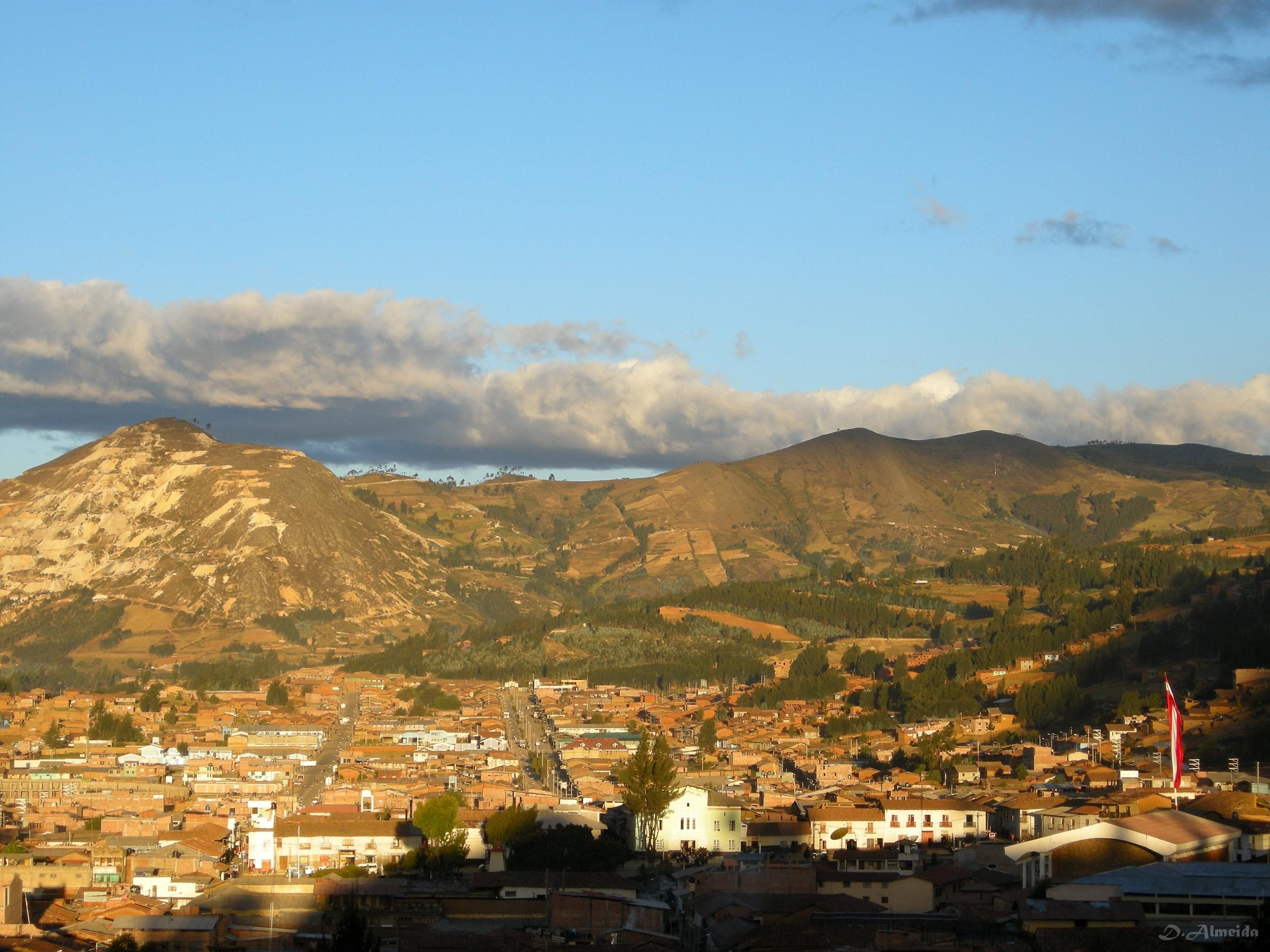
- Huamachuco
- Interactive map of Huamachuco
- Country: Peru
- Region: La Libertad
- Province: Sánchez Carrión
- Capital: Huamachuco

Government
  - Mayor: Benito Robert Contreras Morales

Area
  - Total: 424.13 km^{2} (163.76 sq mi)
- Elevation: 3,110 m (10,200 ft)

Population (2017)
  - Total: 66,902
  - Density: 157.74/km^{2} (408.54/sq mi)
- Time zone: UTC-5 (PET)

Huamachuco District is one of the districts of the Sánchez Carrión province located in La Libertad Region in Peru. It contains the capital of the province and the important archeological site of Marcahuamachuco, which was active, likely as an oracle center and place for religious and political elites, about 350 CE to 1100 CE.

== History ==
The area is 184 km (114 mi) from Trujillo, the capital of the Region, located closer to the coast.

The ancient wachemines forged culture and language in the heart of the current La Libertad Region, living at a height of 3,210m (10,400 feet) above sea level. This district was long occupied by people who used domesticated animals in the puna (grasslands) and cultivated agricultural crops in the lower part of the terrain. They developed terraced agriculture, which in the region is known as andenenes. It was dominated by the Wari' people who created woven textiles, and many artifacts and tools of a variety of metals, including precious ones.

They built Marcahuamachuco, a large, monumental complex believed to have been used as a political and religious center of the elites of a culture that thrived 350 CE-1100 CE. In the culture's later stages, they interred their elite in the 12-foot-high walls surrounding the monuments. All this was done long before the conquest by the Inca and the later arrival of the Spanish.

=== Settlements ===
During the Andean formative and Developmental period, small settlements grew up throughout the highlands of the Huamachuco area. The Huari people built dwellings that were simple oval-shaped single rooms made of field stones, with floors of clay. These structures were used in the agricultural communities mainly for storage of crops and other goods, and sleeping.

The hamlets at higher elevations (3900–4000 m.) were bases for their herding of domesticated animals, as agriculture could not survive at those heights. The settlements in the lower elevations (2500–3000 m.) contained large amounts of agricultural tools, showing the importance of crops.

The large center of Marcahuamachuco, about 30 miles away, has monumental remains that constitute an archeological site. Researchers believe that it served as a political and religious center for the elites of the society.

The prehistoric Huari economy in the area depended on both agriculture and domesticated livestock, with additional hunting of game. The people ran animal herds of domesticated llama and alpaca in the higher elevations, and cultivated crops at lower elevations.

In the puna grasslands, the people cultivated domesticated tubers such as potatoes, oca, isanu, ulluca, maca, and arachacha. They also had crops of seed-producing plants, such as varieties of chenopods and lupines, and also amaranths, legumes, cucurbits, and beans. Agriculture was based primarily on potatoes, oca, isanu, ulluca, maca, and arachacha. Throughout this period, the people also developed and maintained intricate networks of irrigated terraces to support maize crops.

In addition to using their domesticated animals for food, the people of Huamachuco hunted game, such as deer and birds. They also hunted various types of rodents. The peoples depended on their domestic animals to satisfy much of their need for food, clothing, and transportation. They used them less in agriculture.

Metal artifacts have been found, attesting to their skilled artisans. Their materials were not only gold, silver, and copper, but also gilded copper and some arsenic bronze mixtures. Common metal products included chisels, adzes, plates, pins, tupus, needles, and tweezers; ingots and scraps of pure metals have been recovered as archeological artifacts.

Textile manufacture was an essential prehistoric economic activity in this region, as evidenced by the many weaving tools found at the archeological site. Due to the wet climate, virtually no ancient textiles from this area have survived.

There is evidence that Huamachuco had trade and other interaction with neighboring areas, including Cajamarca to the south, and the Recuay and Moche cultures to the west. Through Callejon de Huaylas, it also traded with the coast. With its political center Marcahuamachuco, the people of Huamachuco traded during the Andean regional period.

=== Military history ===
By the late nineteenth century, there was international interest in the region. European travelers had published drawings and reports of the Marcahuamachuco ruins. Political unrest and an outbreak of fighting was reported by The New York Times of the United States in August 1883.

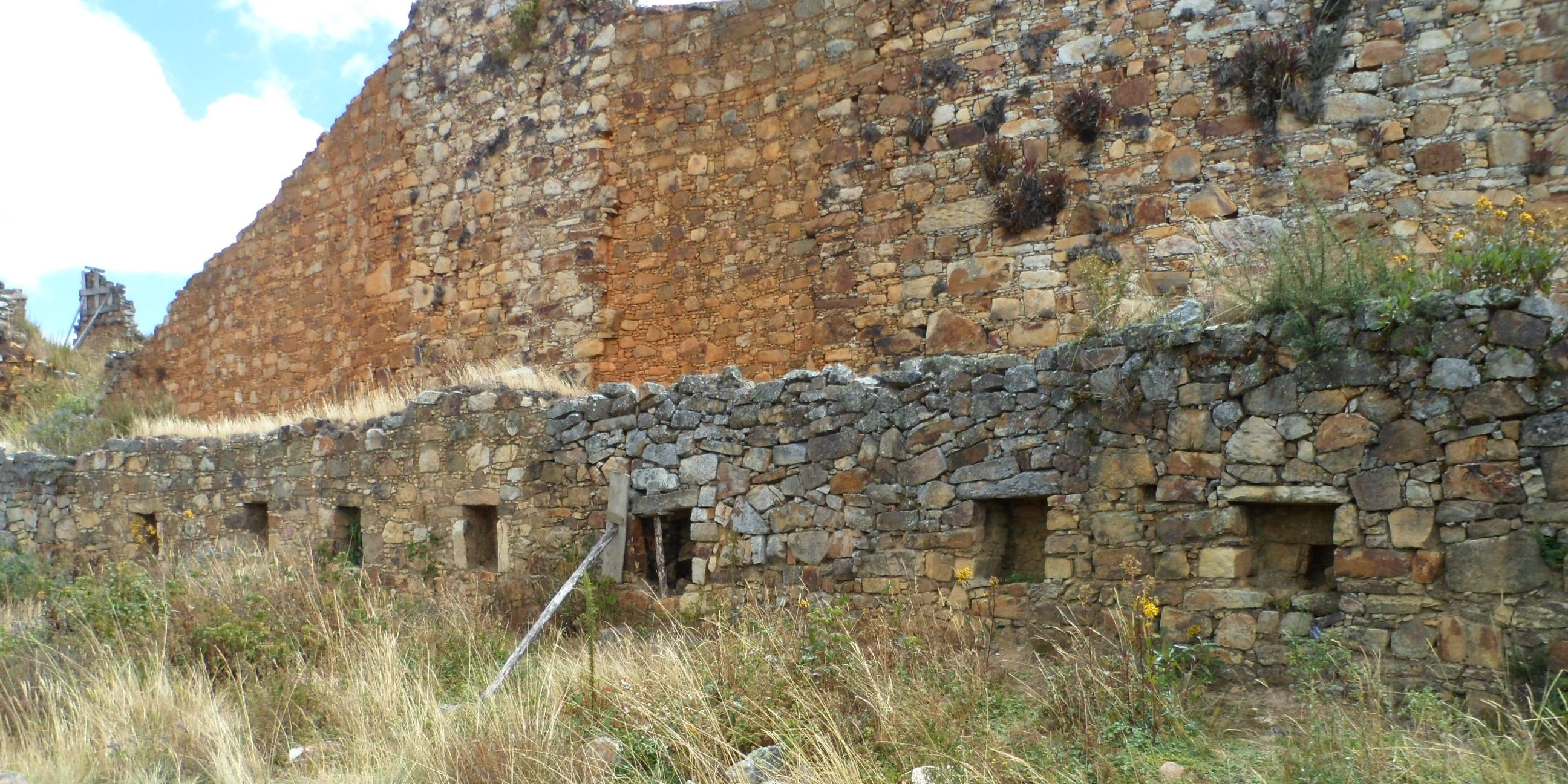
Marcahuamachuco, an archaeological complex about 30 minutes from Huamachuco

== Climate ==
Climate data for Huamachuco, elevation 3,186 m (10,453 ft), (1991–2020)
Month	Jan	Feb	Mar	Apr	May	Jun	Jul	Aug	Sep	Oct	Nov	Dec	Year
Mean daily maximum °C (°F)	18.3 (64.9)	18.0 (64.4)	17.6 (63.7)	18.3 (64.9)	18.7 (65.7)	18.6 (65.5)	18.7 (65.7)	19.2 (66.6)	19.5 (67.1)	19.1 (66.4)	19.0 (66.2)	18.4 (65.1)	18.6 (65.5)
Mean daily minimum °C (°F)	7.6 (45.7)	8.0 (46.4)	8.0 (46.4)	7.6 (45.7)	6.8 (44.2)	5.8 (42.4)	5.4 (41.7)	5.7 (42.3)	6.8 (44.2)	7.1 (44.8)	6.5 (43.7)	7.3 (45.1)	6.9 (44.4)
Average precipitation mm (inches)	118.2 (4.65)	145.0 (5.71)	176.4 (6.94)	97.1 (3.82)	50.3 (1.98)	16.6 (0.65)	10.0 (0.39)	11.5 (0.45)	38.8 (1.53)	102.9 (4.05)	96.4 (3.80)	135.6 (5.34)	998.8 (39.31)
Source: National Meteorology and Hydrology Service of Peru
