= Lake Pacucha =

Lake in Peru

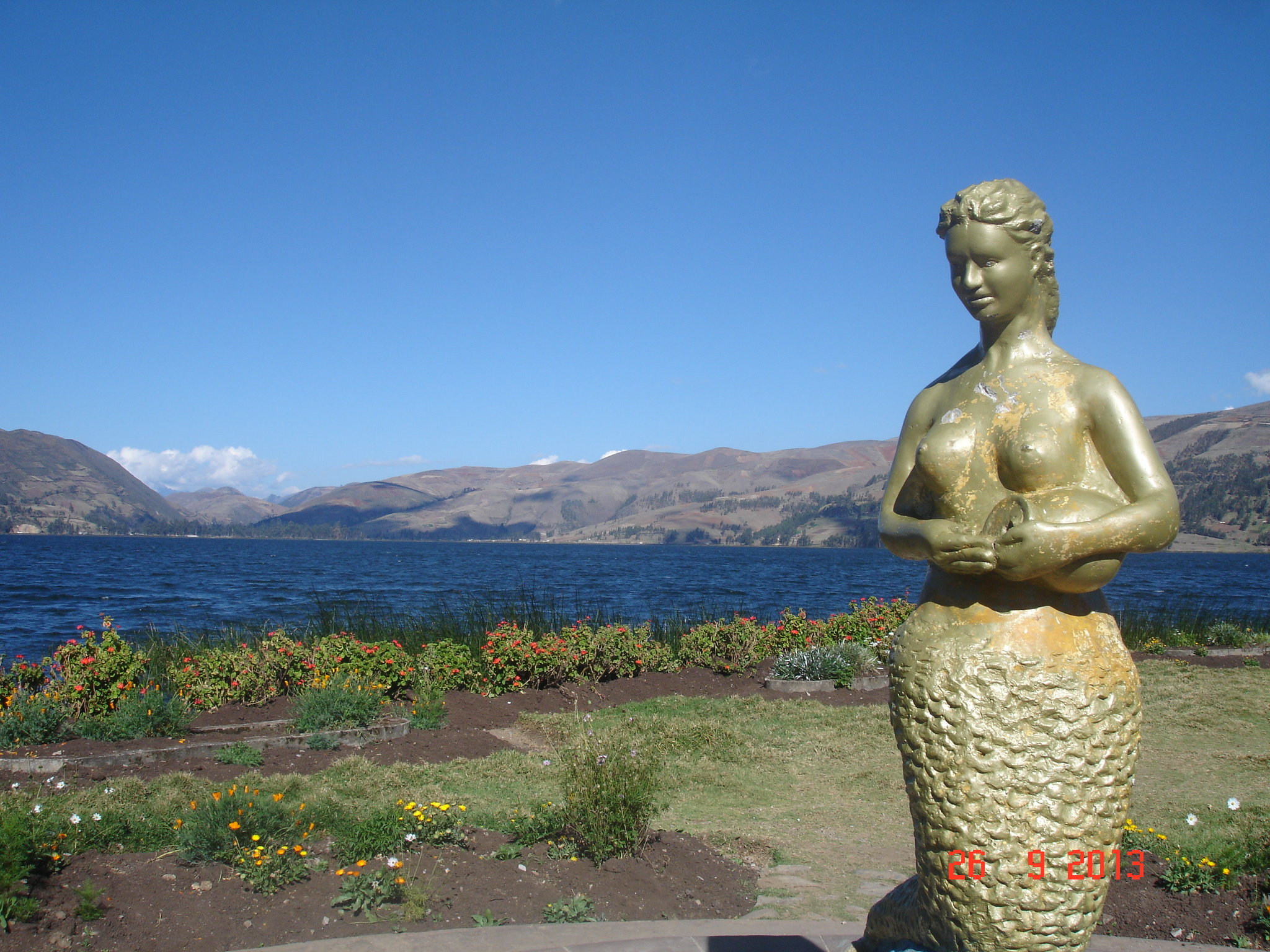
- Pacucha Lake

- Location within Peru
- Location: Apurímac Region
- Coordinates: 13.61284°S 73.317812°W
- Basin countries: Peru

Lake Pacucha is a lake in the Apurímac Region in Peru.

== See also ==
- List of lakes in Peru
