= Yanawara =

Yanawara (Aymara or Quechua, Hispanicized spelling Yanahuara) may refer to:

- Yanawara (Ananta), a mountain near Ananta Lake on the border of the districts Ocuviri, Paratía District and Santa Lucía, in the Lampa Province, Puno Region, Peru
- Yanawara (Arequipa), a mountain in the Arequipa Region, Peru
- Yanawara (Palca-Paratía), a mountain on the border of the Palca District and the Paratía District, northeast of the lake Sayt'uqucha, in the Lampa Province, Puno Region
- Yanawara (Puno), a mountain on the border of the Palca District and the Paratía District, northwest of the lake Sayt'uqucha, in the Lampa Province, Puno Region
- Yanahuara District, a district in the Arequipa Region, Peru
- Yana-Wara, a 2023 Peruvian drama and mystery film.
