= Aqup'ukru =

Mountain in Peru

- Location within Peru

Highest point
- Elevation: 4,997 m (16,394 ft)
- Coordinates: 15°25′15″S 70°41′13″W

Geography
- Location: Peru, Puno Region
- Parent range: Andes

Aqup'ukru (Quechua aqu sand, p'ukru hole, pit, gap in a surface, "sand hole", Hispanicized spelling Acopugro) is a 4,997-metre-high (16,394 ft) mountain in the Andes of Peru. It is located in the Puno Region, Lampa Province, Paratía District. Aqup'ukru is situated south of the mountain Yanawara, west of the lake Sayt'uqucha and southeast of the mountain Pachakutiq.
