= T'akra =

Mountain in Peru

- Location within Peru

Highest point
- Elevation: 5,100 m (16,700 ft)
- Coordinates: 15°17′37″S 70°48′14″W

Geography
- Location: Peru
- Parent range: Andes

T'akra (Quechua for "uncultivated land", also spelled Tajra) is a mountain in the Andes of Peru, about 5,100 m (16,700 ft) high. It is located in the Puno Region, Lampa Province, Ocuviri District. T'akra lies southwest of Qullqa Sirka and northwest of Qillqa and Machu Kunturi.
