= San Román province =

Coordinates: 15.4909°S 70.133114°W

San Román
- Province
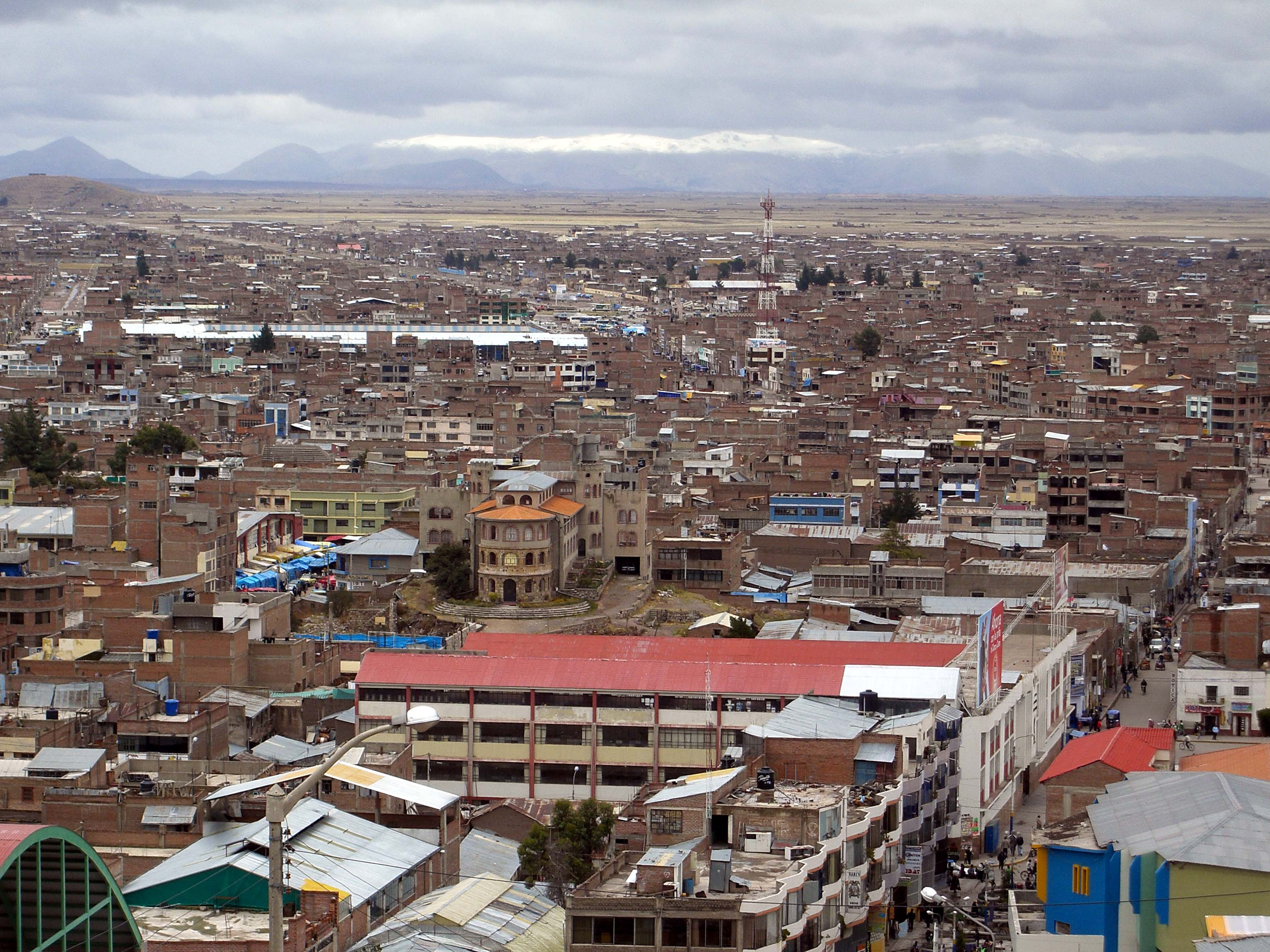
- Juliaca, the capital of the San Román Province

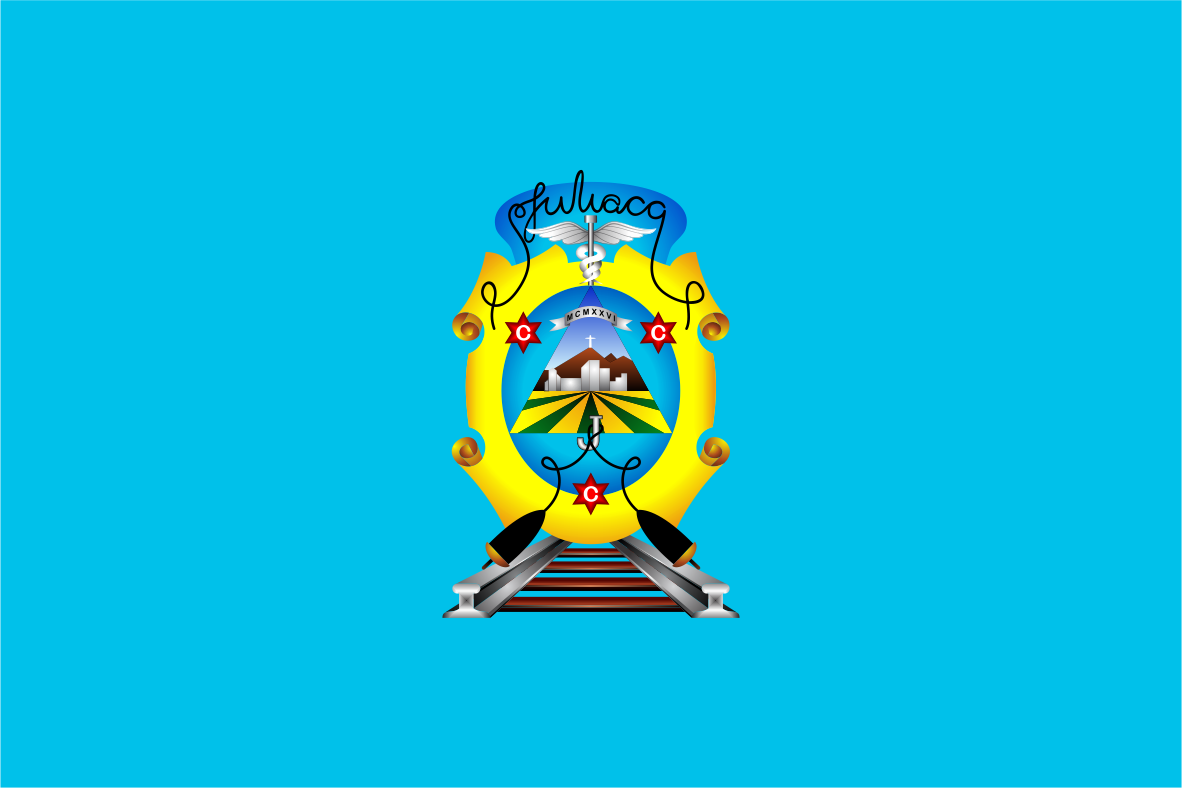
- Flag

- Location of San Román in the Puno Region
- Country: Peru
- Region: Puno
- Capital: Juliaca

Government
  - Mayor: David Sucacahua Yucra (2019-2022)

Area
  - Total: 2,277.63 km^{2} (879.40 sq mi)
- Elevation: 3,824 m (12,546 ft)

Population
  - Total: 307,417
  - Density: 134.972/km^{2} (349.577/sq mi)
- UBIGEO: 2111
- Website: www.munijuliaca.gob.pe

San Román is a province in the Puno Region of Peru. It borders the provinces of Lampa, Azángaro, Puno, Huancane, the Arequipa Province of the Arequipa Region and Moquegua Region's province of General Sánchez Cerro. Its capital is the city of Juliaca.

== Political division ==
The province is divided into four districts (Spanish: distritos, singular: distrito):

- Cabana
- Cabanillas
- Caracoto
- Juliaca

== Ethnic groups ==
The province is inhabited by indigenous citizens of Aymara and Quechua descent. Spanish is the language which the majority of the population (61.52%) learnt to speak in childhood, 29.80% of the residents started speaking using the Quechua language and 8.53% using Aymara (2007 Peru Census).

== See also ==
- Intikancha
- Saraqucha
- Sayt'uqucha
