= Pachakutiq (Puno) =

Mountain in Peru

- Location within Peru

Highest point
- Elevation: 5,000 m (16,000 ft)
- Coordinates: 15°24′32″S 70°41′46″W

Geography
- Location: Peru, Puno Region
- Parent range: Andes

Pachakutiq (Quechua pacha time, space, kuti return, "return of time", "change of time", pacha kuti "great change or disturbance in the social or political order", -q a suffix, Pachakutiq an Inca emperor, Hispanicized spelling Pachacutec) is a mountain in the Andes of Peru, about 5,000 metres (16,404 ft) high. It is located in the Puno Region, Lampa Province, Paratía District. Pachakutiq is situated southwest of the mountain Yanawara, west of the lake Sayt'uqucha and north of the mountain Aqup'ukru.
