= Pichaqani (Puno) =

Mountain in Peru

- Location within Peru

Highest point
- Elevation: 4,800 m (15,700 ft)
- Coordinates: 15°18′51″S 70°50′21″W

Geography
- Location: Peru
- Parent range: Andes

Pichaqani (Aymara pichaqa, phichaqa, piqacha a big needle, -ni a suffix to indicate ownership, "the one with a big needle", Hispanicized spelling Pichacane) is a mountain in the Andes of Peru, about 4,800 metres (15,748 ft) high. It is situated in the Puno Region, Lampa Province, Ocuviri District. Pichaqani lies north of the lakes Ananta and Suyt'uqucha and west of the mountains Qillqa and Machu Kunturi.
