= Illani =

Mountain in the Andes of Peru

- Location within Peru

Highest point
- Elevation: 5,000 m (16,000 ft)
- Coordinates: 15°25′32″S 70°39′26″W

Geography
- Location: Peru, Puno Region
- Parent range: Andes

Illani (Aymara, also spelled Illane) is a mountain in the Andes of Peru, about 5,000 metres (16,404 ft) high. It is located in the Puno Region, Lampa Province, Paratía District. Illani is situated southeast of the mountain Yanawara, east of the lake Sayt'uqucha and northwest of a group of lakes named Kimsaqucha (Quechua for "three lakes", Quimsaccocha).
