= Yaritayuq =

Mountain in Peru

- Location within Peru

Highest point
- Elevation: 4,800 m (15,700 ft)
- Coordinates: 15°22′54″S 70°37′01″W

Geography
- Location: Peru, Puno Region
- Parent range: Andes

Yaritayuq (yarita local name for Azorella compacta, Quechua -yuq a suffix to indicate ownership, "the one with the yarita", Hispanicized spelling Yaritalloc) is a mountain in the Andes of Peru, about 4,800 m (15,700 ft) high. It is located in the Puno Region, Lampa Province, on the border of the districts of Palca and Paratia. Yaritayuq lies east of Yanawara.
