= Wankara (Peru) =

Mountain in Peru

- Location within Peru

Highest point
- Elevation: 4,800 m (15,700 ft)
- Coordinates: 15°33′42″S 70°36′21″W

Geography
- Location: Peru, Puno Region, Lampa Province
- Parent range: Andes

Wankara (Aymara for a kind of drum, Hispanicized spelling Huancara) is a mountain in the Andes of Peru, about 4,800 metres (15,748 ft) high. It is located in the Puno Region, Lampa Province, on the border of the districts Paratía and Santa Lucía. Wankara lies southwest of the mountains Phisqa Tira, Awallani and Kuntur Ikiña and northwest of Pukasalla.
