= Kirani (Peru) =

Mountain in Peru

- Location within Peru

Highest point
- Elevation: 5,000 m (16,000 ft)
- Coordinates: 15°21′29″S 70°47′31″W

Geography
- Location: Peru
- Parent range: Andes

Kirani (Aymara kira stick for the roof; rope, -ni a suffix, Hispanicized spelling Quirane) is a mountain in the Andes of Peru, about 5,000 metres (16,404 ft) high. It is located in the Puno Region, Lampa Province, Paratia District. Kirani lies northeast of Yanawara, east of Ananta Lake.
