= Paratía District =

Coordinates: 15°27′29″S 70°36′27″W

Paratía
- District
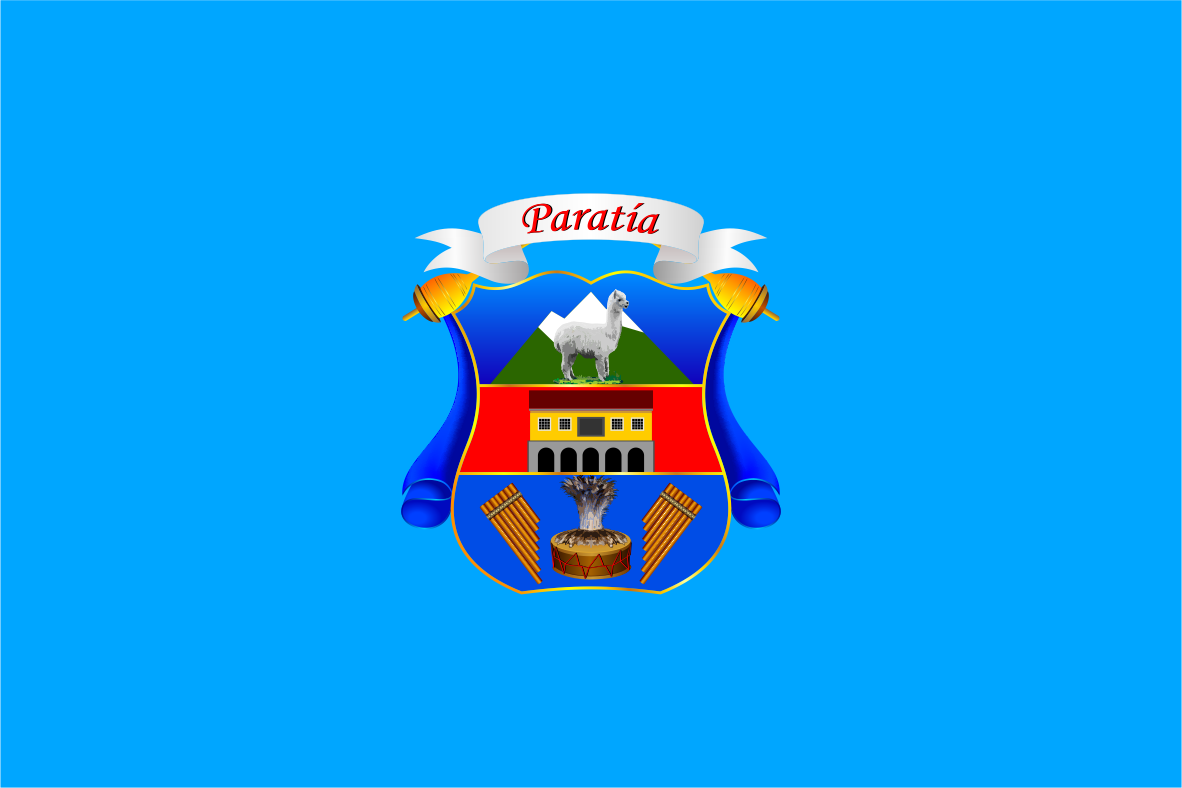
- Flag
- Interactive map of Paratía
- Country: Peru
- Region: Puno
- Province: Lampa
- Founded: April 23, 1954
- Capital: Paratía

Government
  - Mayor: Apolonio Ezequiel Yareta Mamani

Area
  - Total: 745.08 km^{2} (287.68 sq mi)
- Elevation: 4,390 m (14,400 ft)

Population (2005 census)
  - Total: 4,960
  - Density: 6.66/km^{2} (17.2/sq mi)
- Time zone: UTC-5 (PET)
- UBIGEO: 210707

Paratía District is one of ten districts of the province Lampa in Peru.

== Geography ==
Some of the highest mountains of the district are listed below:

- Amayani
- Anta Q'awa
- Aqu P'ukru
- Awallani
- Chunkara
- Hatun Pastu
- Illani
- Janq'uyu
- Kimsa Chata
- Kirani
- Kuntur Sayana
- Kuntur Wasi
- Kunturi
- Pachakutiq
- Pukara
- Phisqa Tira
- P'isqi Punta
- Qillqa
- Qillwayuq
- Q'atawini
- Sayt'u
- Wankara
- Warini
- Waykira
- Wisa wisa
- Yana Qaqa
- Yanawara (Ananta)
- Yanawara (Palca-Paratía)
- Yanawara (Paratía)
- Yaritayuq

== Ethnic groups ==
The people in the district are mainly indigenous citizens of Quechua descent. Quechua is the language which the majority of the population (91.83%) learnt to speak in childhood, 7.59% of the residents started speaking using the Spanish language (2007 Peru Census).

== Climate ==
Climate data for Pampahuta, elevation 4,316 m (14,160 ft), (1991–2020)
| Month | Jan | Feb | Mar | Apr | May | Jun | Jul | Aug | Sep | Oct | Nov | Dec | Year |
|---|---|---|---|---|---|---|---|---|---|---|---|---|---|
| Mean daily maximum °C (°F) | 12.7 (54.9) | 12.6 (54.7) | 12.6 (54.7) | 12.8 (55.0) | 13.0 (55.4) | 12.5 (54.5) | 12.4 (54.3) | 13.3 (55.9) | 14.3 (57.7) | 14.7 (58.5) | 15.0 (59.0) | 13.9 (57.0) | 13.3 (56.0) |
| Mean daily minimum °C (°F) | 0.0 (32.0) | 0.2 (32.4) | −0.3 (31.5) | −2.4 (27.7) | −6.6 (20.1) | −9.6 (14.7) | −10.4 (13.3) | −9.8 (14.4) | −7.7 (18.1) | −5.4 (22.3) | −4.0 (24.8) | −1.5 (29.3) | −4.8 (23.4) |
| Average precipitation mm (inches) | 174.3 (6.86) | 176.7 (6.96) | 131.3 (5.17) | 59.9 (2.36) | 8.5 (0.33) | 2.8 (0.11) | 4.1 (0.16) | 7.7 (0.30) | 15.2 (0.60) | 42.8 (1.69) | 58.4 (2.30) | 125.9 (4.96) | 807.6 (31.8) |
Source: National Meteorology and Hydrology Service of Peru

== See also ==
- Sayt'uqucha
