= Uturunqani (Lampa) =

Mountain in Peru

- Location within Peru

Highest point
- Elevation: 5,092 m (16,706 ft)
- Coordinates: 15°22′37″S 70°55′12″W

Geography
- Location: Peru, Puno Region, Lampa Province
- Parent range: Andes

Uturunqani (Aymara uturunqa, uturunqha, uturunqu, uturunqhu tiger (here referring to the jaguar), -ni a suffix to indicate ownership, "the one with the jaguar", Hispanicized spelling Uturuncane) is a 5,092-metre-high (16,706 ft) mountain in the Andes of Peru. It is situated in the Puno Region, Lampa Province, Santa Lucía District. Uturunqani lies west and northwest of the lakes Ananta and Suyt'uqucha and southeast of the mountain Mamañawi. A little lake named Suraqucha (Soracocha) lies at its southeastern slope.
