= Sayt'uqucha (San Román) =

Lake in the Puno Region, Peru

- Location within Peru
- Location: Puno Region, San Román Province
- Coordinates: 15°54′13″S 70°32′26″W
- Basin countries: Peru

Sayt'uqucha or Sayt'u Qucha (Quechua suyt'u, sayt'u rectangular, qucha lake, lagoon, "rectangular lake", hispanicized spellings Saytococha) is a lake in Peru located in the Puno Region, San Román Province, Cabanillas District. It lies southeast of Saraqucha, the largest lake of the district.
