= Wira Apachita =

Mountain in Peru

- Location within Peru

Highest point
- Elevation: 5,100 m (16,700 ft)
- Coordinates: 15°21′55″S 70°39′06″W

Geography
- Location: Peru, Puno Region
- Parent range: Andes

Wira Apachita (Aymara wira the ground or anything which goes downhill, apachita the place of transit of an important pass in the principal routes of the Andes; name in the Andes for a stone cairn built along the trail in the high mountains, Hispanicized spelling Huira Apacheta) is a mountain in the Andes of Peru, about 5,100 metres (16,732 ft) high. It is located in the Puno Region, Lampa Province, Palca District. Wira Apachita is situated northeast of the lake Sayt'uqucha and the mountain Yanawara.
