= Yanawara (Palca-Paratía) =

Mountain in Peru

- Location within Peru

Highest point
- Elevation: 5,000 m (16,000 ft)
- Coordinates: 15°23′52″S 70°35′41″W

Geography
- Location: Peru, Puno Region
- Parent range: Andes

Yanawara (in the local language, also spelled Yanahuara) is a mountain in the Andes of Peru, about 5,000 metres (16,404 ft) high. It is located in the Puno Region, Lampa Province, on the border of the districts Palca and Paratía. Yanawara is situated southeast of the higher mountain named Yanawara and the peaks of Wira Apachita and Yaritayuq, and northeast of the lake Sayt'uqucha.
