= Qullqa Sirka =

Mountain in Peru

- Location within Peru

Highest point
- Elevation: 5,000 m (16,000 ft)
- Coordinates: 15°17′10″S 70°47′33″W

Geography
- Location: Peru
- Parent range: Andes

Qullqa Sirka (Aymara qullqa granary, sirka vein of the body or a mine, "granary vein", also spelled Colcasirca) is a mountain in the Andes of Peru, about 5,000 m (16,000 ft) high. It is located in the Puno Region, Lampa Province, Ocuviri District. Qullqa Sirka lies north of Machu Kunturi and northeast of T'akra.
