= Pariwana =

Mountain in Peru

- Location within Peru

Highest point
- Elevation: 5,022 m (16,476 ft)
- Coordinates: 15°14′29″S 70°43′33″W

Naming
- English translation: flamingo
- Language of name: Quechua

Geography
- Location: Peru, Puno Region
- Parent range: Andes

Pariwana (Quechua for flamingo, Hispanicized spelling Parihuana) is a 5,022-metre-high (16,476 ft) mountain in the Andes of Peru. It is located in the Puno Region, Lampa Province, on the border of the districts of Palca and Vilavila. Pariwana lies north of Qillqa.
