= Mamañawi =

Mountain in Peru

- Location within Peru

Highest point
- Elevation: 5,100 m (16,700 ft)
- Coordinates: 15°21′21″S 70°56′05″W

Geography
- Location: Peru, Puno Region
- Parent range: Andes

Mamañawi (Quechua mama mother, madam; vein (or seam), ñawi eye, Hispanicized spelling Mamañahui) is a mountain in the Andes of Peru, about 5,100-metre (16,732 ft) high. It is situated in the Puno Region, Lampa Province, Santa Lucía. Mamañawi lies northwest of the mountain Uturunqani and southeast of Puka Punchu.
