= Wankarani (Lampa) =

Mountain in Peru

- Location within Peru

Highest point
- Elevation: 4,800 m (15,700 ft)
- Coordinates: 15°22′44″S 70°33′04″W

Geography
- Location: Peru, Puno Region
- Parent range: Andes

Wankarani (Aymara wankara a kind of drum, -ni a suffix to indicate ownership, "the one with a wankara", Hispanicized spelling Huancarane) is a mountain in the Andes of Peru, about 4,800 metres (15,748 ft) high. It is located in the Puno Region, Lampa Province, Palca District.

== See also ==
- Yanawara
