= Santa Lucía District, Lampa =

Coordinates: 15°41′44″S 70°36′33″W

Santa Lucía
- District
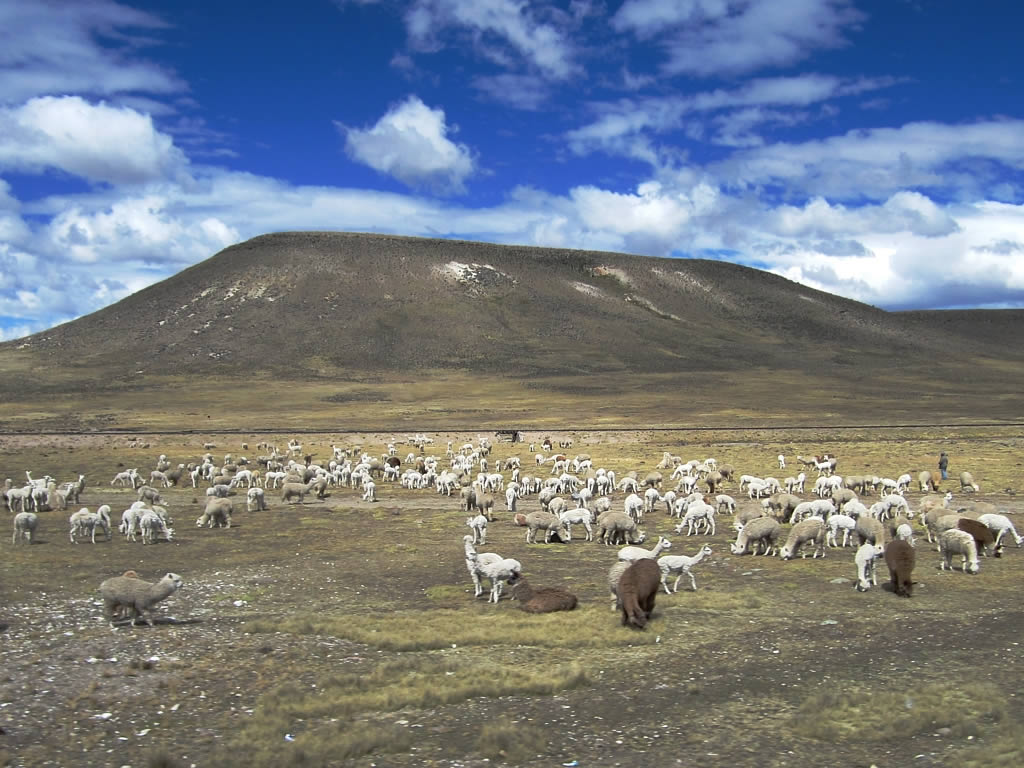
- Alpacas grazing on the plateau west of Lagunillas Lake, Santa Rosa District

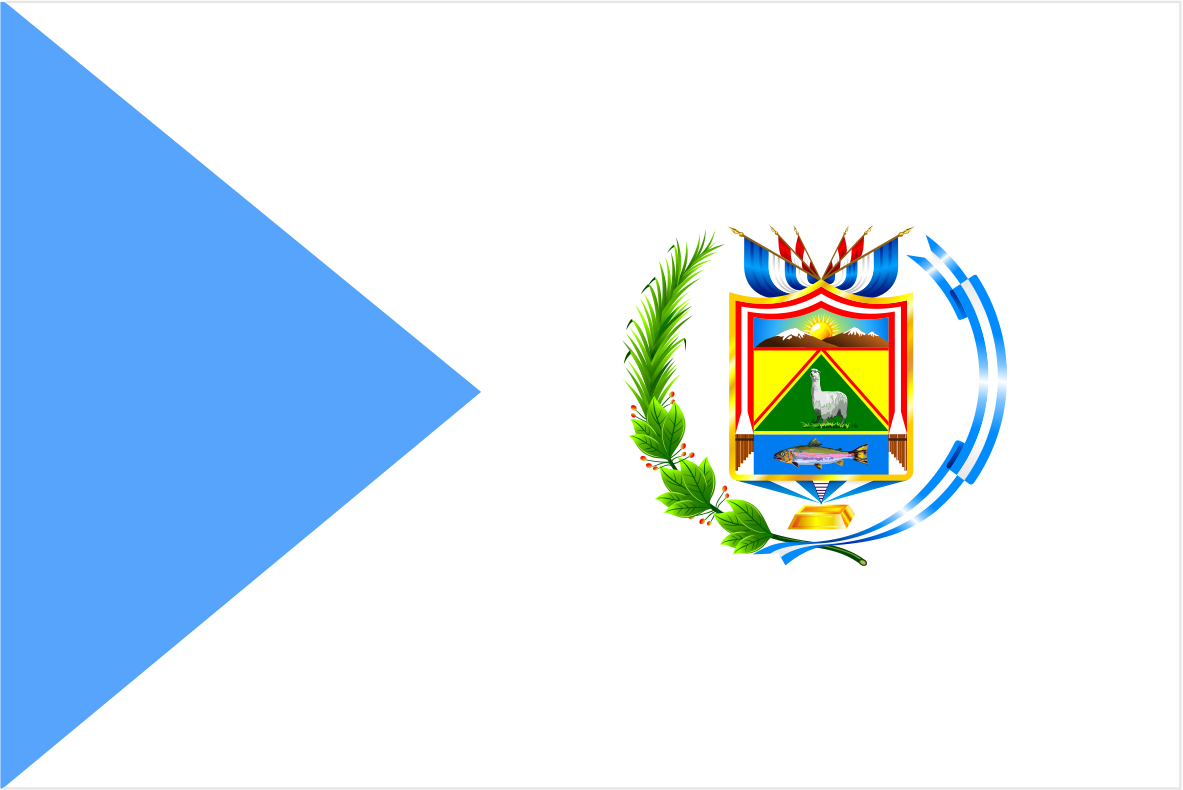
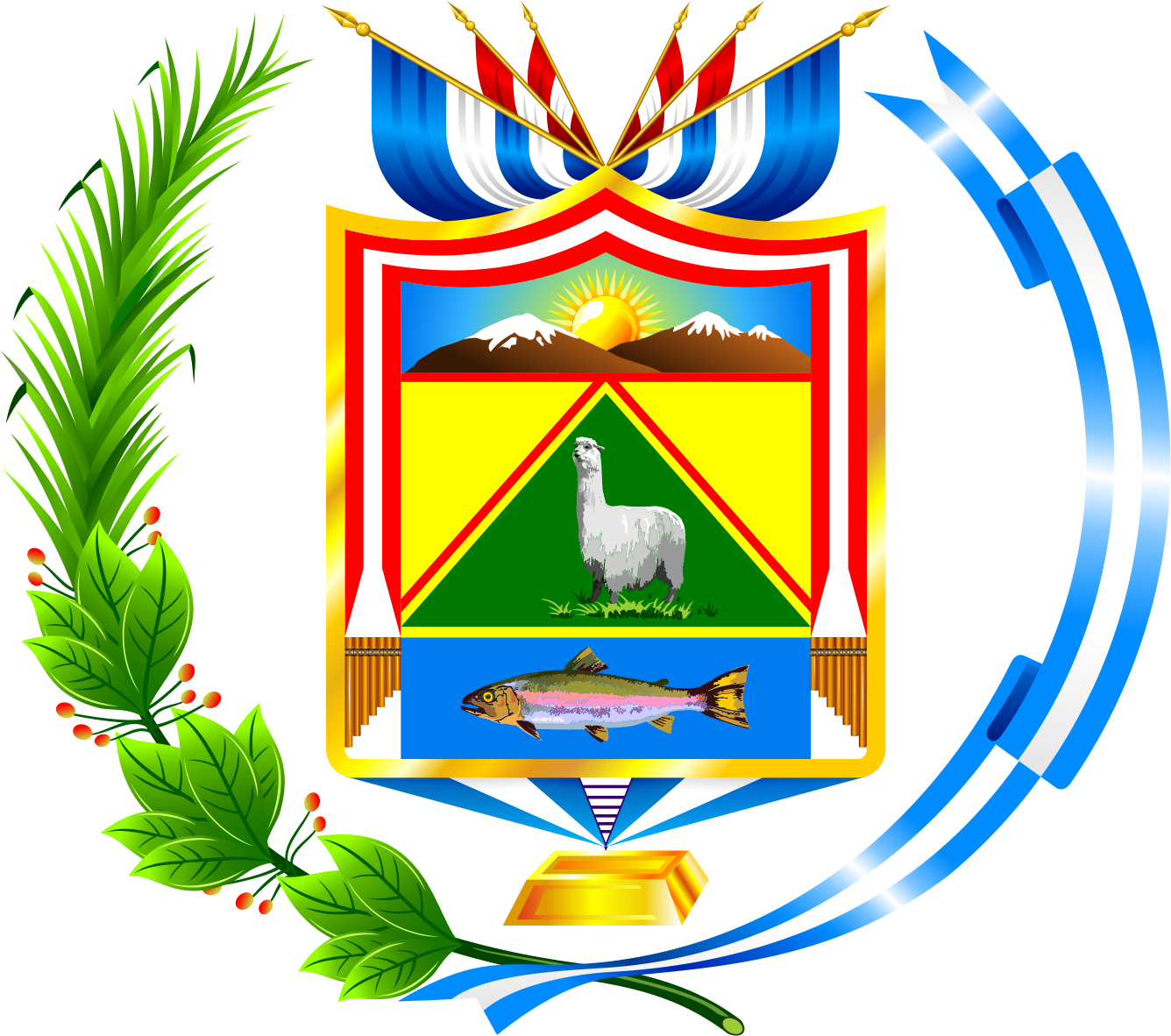
- Flag Coat of arms
- Interactive map of Santa Lucía
- Country: Peru
- Region: Puno
- Province: Lampa
- Founded: April 17, 1936
- Capital: Santa Lucía

Government
  - Mayor: Salvador Alejo Tunco

Area
  - Total: 1,595.67 km^{2} (616.09 sq mi)
- Elevation: 4,025 m (13,205 ft)

Population (2005 census)
  - Total: 8,130
  - Density: 5.10/km^{2} (13.2/sq mi)
- Time zone: UTC-5 (PET)
- UBIGEO: 210709

Santa Lucía District is one of ten districts of the province Lampa in Peru.

== Geography ==
Some of the highest mountains of the district are listed below:

- Allqamarini
- Anka Wachana
- Awallani
- Hatun Q'asa
- Iru Parki
- Jayu Laqhi
- Jichu Qullu
- Kuntur Puñuna
- Kuntur Uma
- Kuntur Umaña
- Kunturini
- Lluqu
- Mamañawi
- Pirwani
- Puka Punchu
- Puka Salla
- Pukara
- Putusillu
- Phisqa Tira
- Qaqinkurani
- Qina Qutu
- Q'atawini
- Q'iru Pata
- Q'iwiri
- Silla Pata
- Tarujani
- Tisña Quta
- T'ula Uqhu
- Uturunqani
- Wankara
- Wanqarani
- Wiqu Qullu
- Yana Qaqa
- Yanawara
- Yaritani
- Yuraq Qaqa

== Ethnic groups ==
The people in the district are mainly indigenous citizens of Quechua descent. Quechua is the language which the majority of the population (56.93%) learnt to speak in childhood, 42.36% of the residents started speaking using the Spanish language (2007 Peru Census).

== Climate ==
Climate data for Santa Lucía, elevation 4,045 m (13,271 ft), (1991–2020)
Month	Jan	Feb	Mar	Apr	May	Jun	Jul	Aug	Sep	Oct	Nov	Dec	Year
Mean daily maximum °C (°F)	15.8 (60.4)	15.5 (59.9)	15.7 (60.3)	16.0 (60.8)	16.1 (61.0)	15.7 (60.3)	15.2 (59.4)	16.4 (61.5)	17.2 (63.0)	18.2 (64.8)	18.8 (65.8)	17.3 (63.1)	16.5 (61.7)
Mean daily minimum °C (°F)	2.5 (36.5)	3.0 (37.4)	1.8 (35.2)	−1.3 (29.7)	−6.2 (20.8)	−8.8 (16.2)	−9.2 (15.4)	−8.4 (16.9)	−5.5 (22.1)	−3.2 (26.2)	−1.7 (28.9)	1.2 (34.2)	−3.0 (26.6)
Average precipitation mm (inches)	113.6 (4.47)	108.6 (4.28)	73.9 (2.91)	25.3 (1.00)	3.5 (0.14)	1.3 (0.05)	5.1 (0.20)	2.8 (0.11)	4.4 (0.17)	11.7 (0.46)	37.4 (1.47)	93.5 (3.68)	481.1 (18.94)
Source: National Meteorology and Hydrology Service of Peru

== See also ==
- Lagunillas Lake
- Suyt'uqucha
