= Lampa, Peru =

- Town
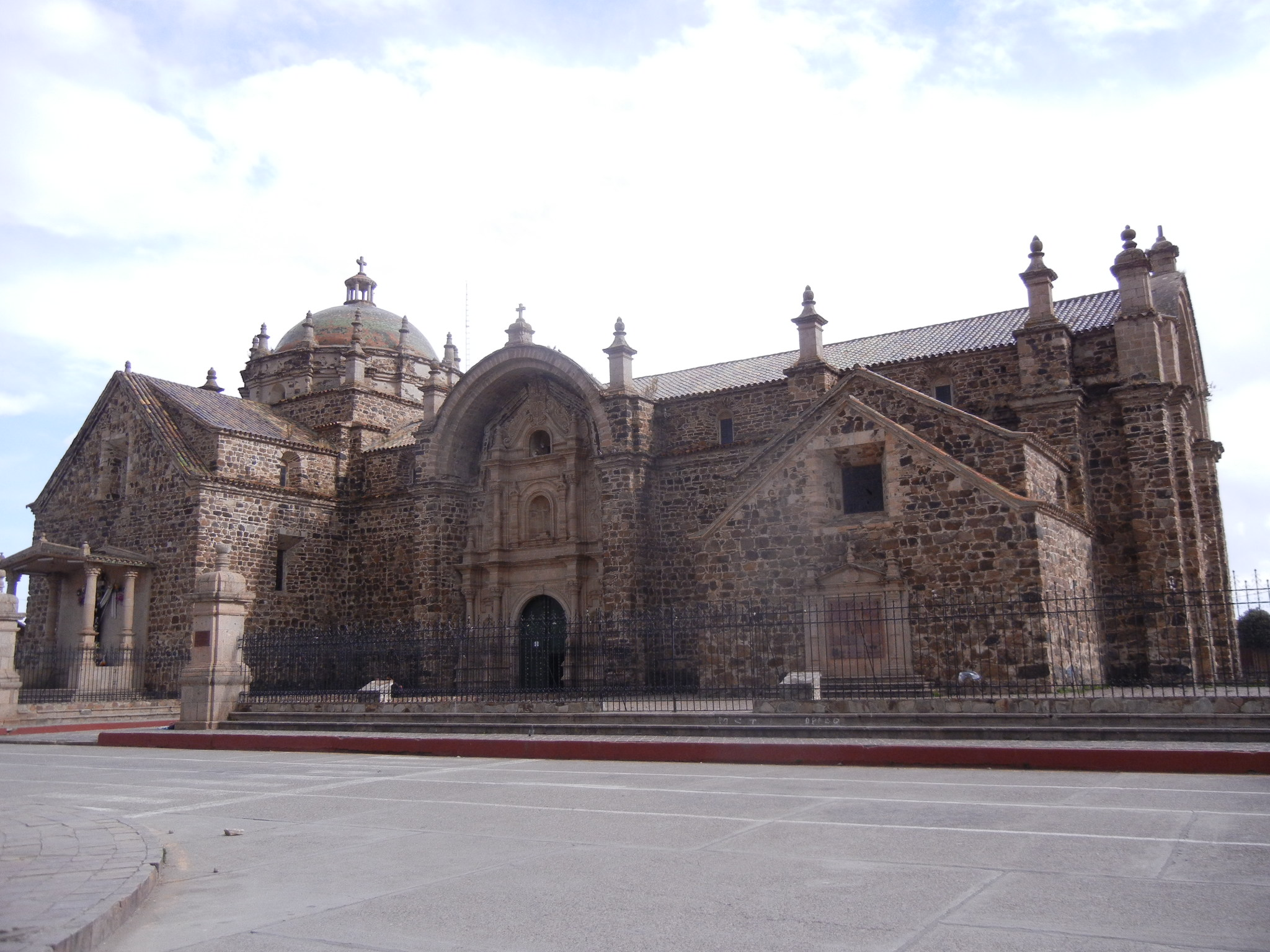
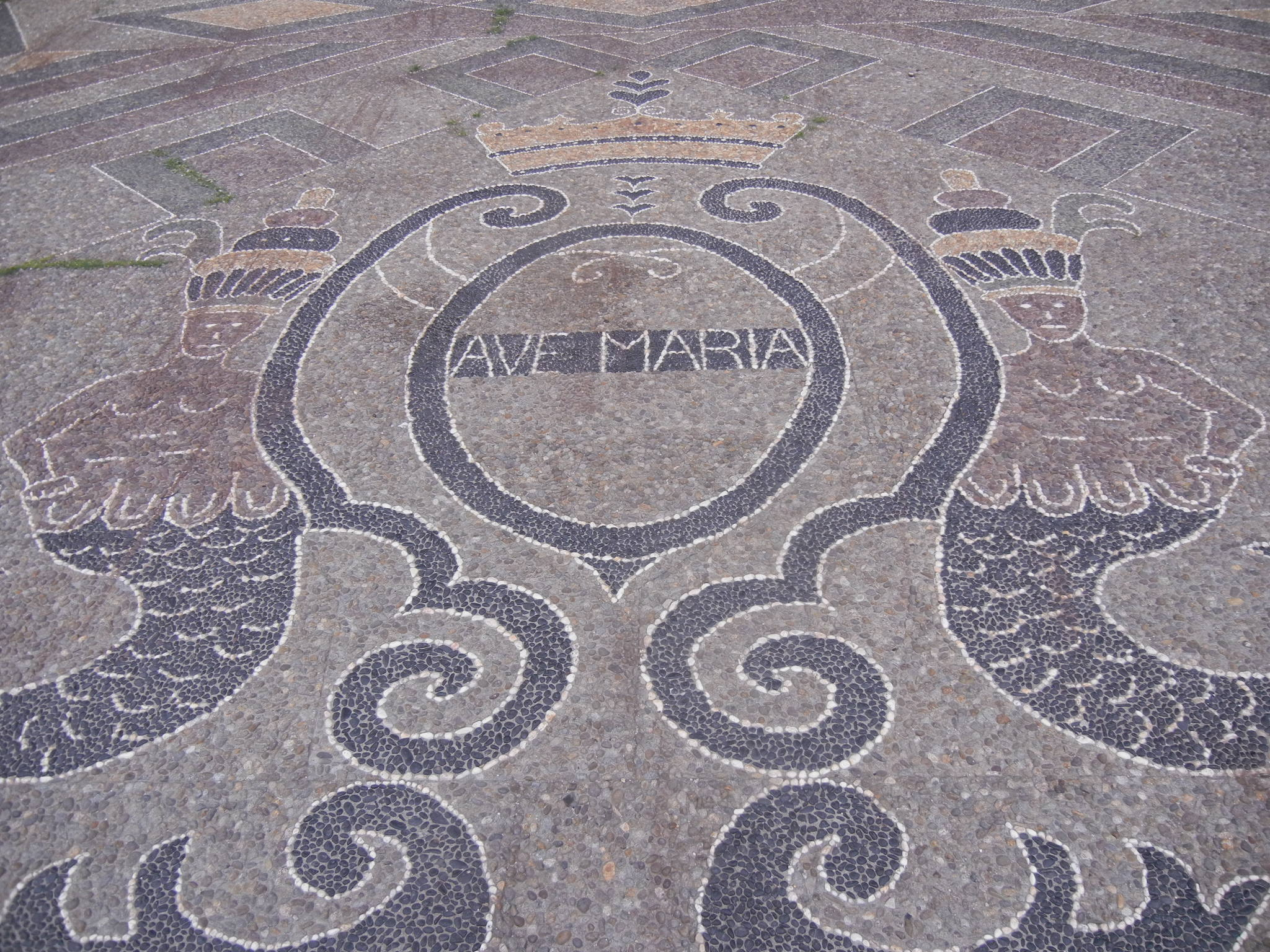
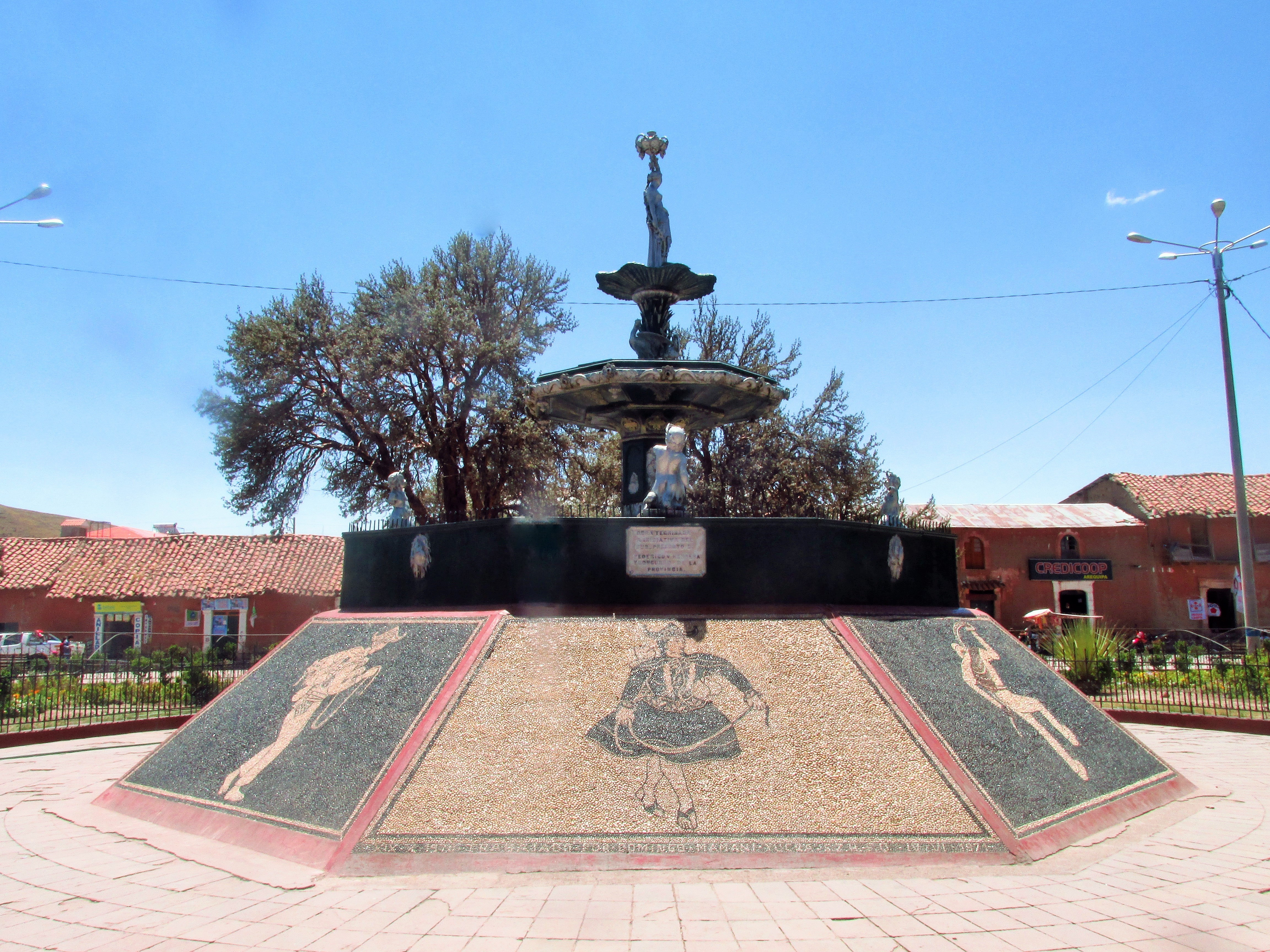
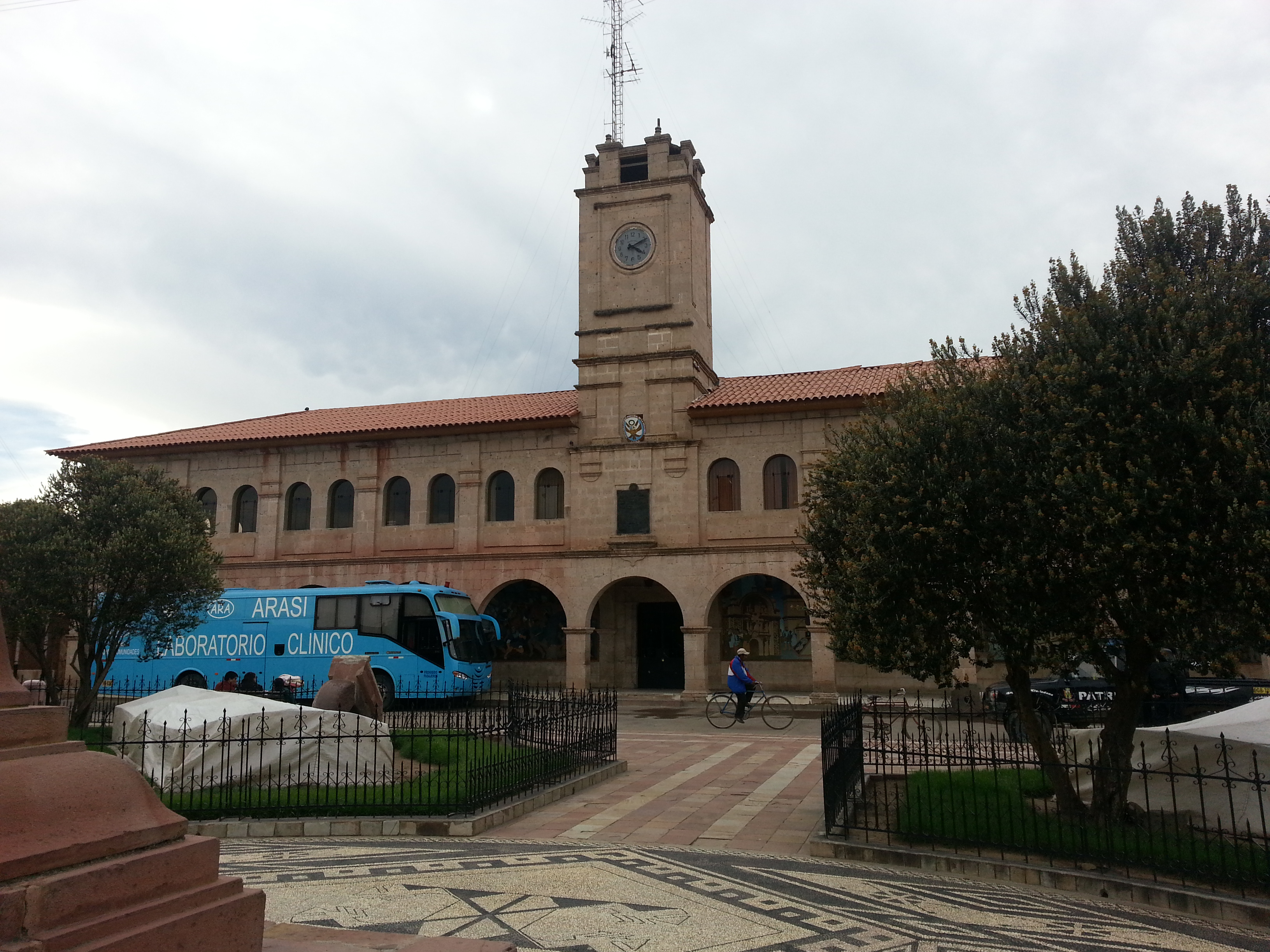
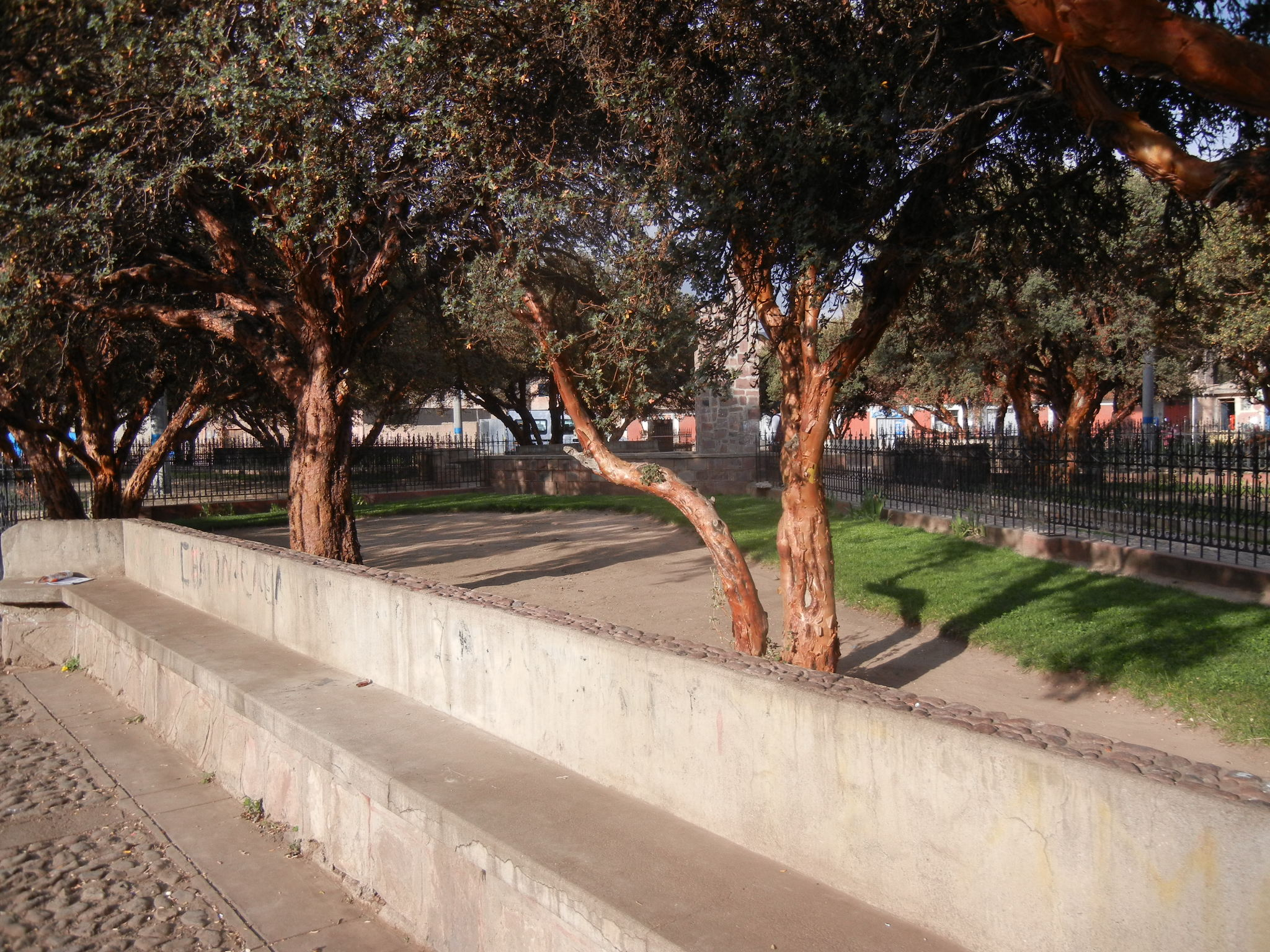
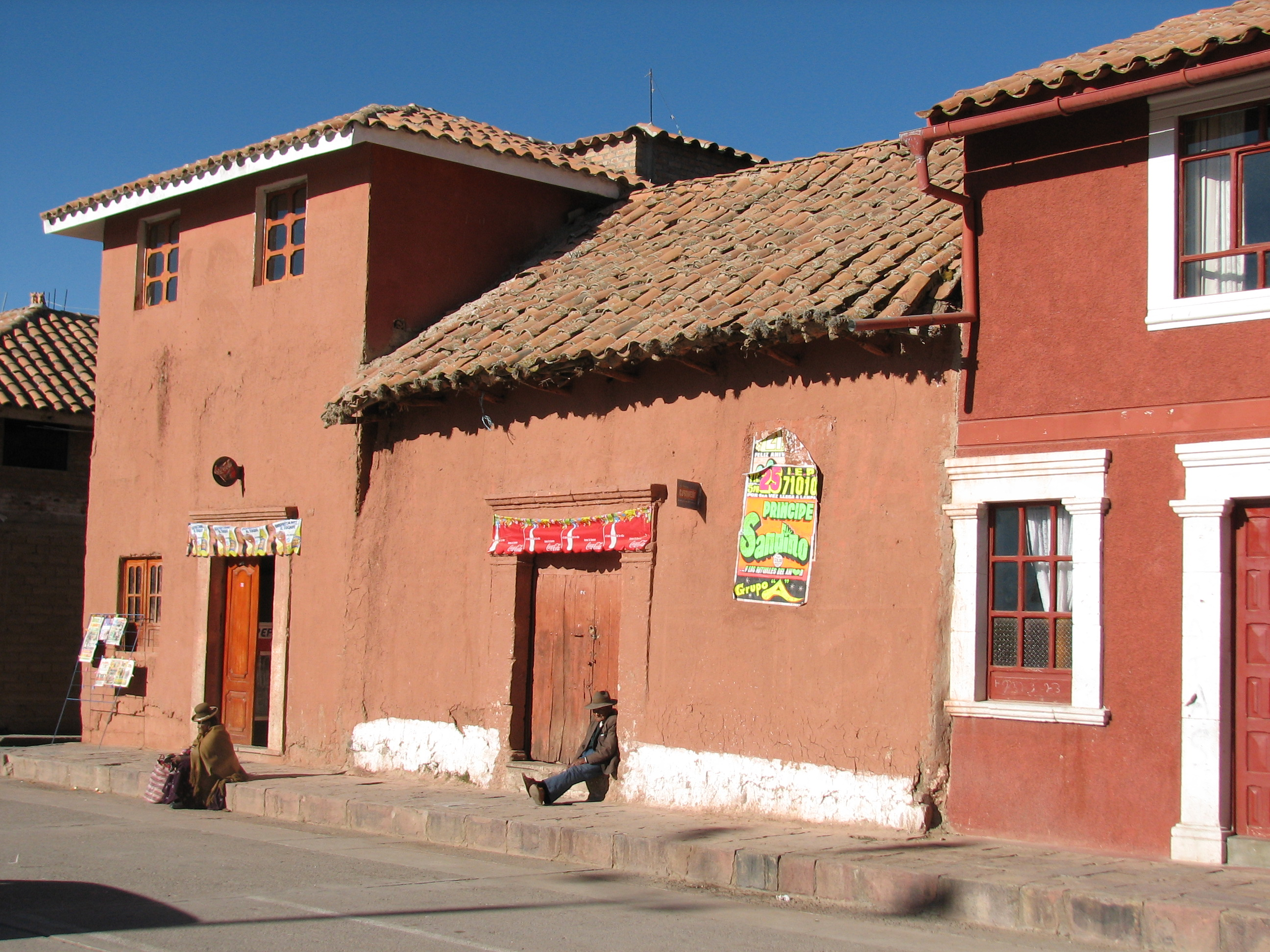
- From top, left to right: Santiago Apostol church in Lampa, mosaic in the entrance to the cathedral, Plaza Grau, Lampa's town hall, 4 de Junio Park and some pink-painted houses
- Nickname: La Ciudad Rosada (The Pink City)
- Location within Peru
- Coordinates: 15°21′49″S 70°21′56″W
- Country: Peru
- Region: Puno
- Province: Lampa
- District: Lampa

Government
  - Mayor: Ciriaco Isidro Diaz Arestegui (2019-2022)
- Elevation: 3,892 m (12,769 ft)

Population
  - Total: 14,780
- Time zone: UTC-5 (PET)

Lampa is a town in Southern Peru. It is the capital of the Lampa Province in the Puno Region. Lampa is situated near the lake Pukaqucha.

== Climate ==
Climate data for Lampa, elevation 3,866 m (12,684 ft), (1991–2020)
Month	Jan	Feb	Mar	Apr	May	Jun	Jul	Aug	Sep	Oct	Nov	Dec	Year
Mean daily maximum °C (°F)	16.4 (61.5)	16.2 (61.2)	16.2 (61.2)	16.5 (61.7)	16.5 (61.7)	15.9 (60.6)	16.0 (60.8)	16.8 (62.2)	17.7 (63.9)	18.1 (64.6)	18.8 (65.8)	17.8 (64.0)	16.9 (62.4)
Mean daily minimum °C (°F)	4.2 (39.6)	4.3 (39.7)	3.8 (38.8)	1.5 (34.7)	−3.0 (26.6)	−5.6 (21.9)	−5.9 (21.4)	−4.5 (23.9)	−1.8 (28.8)	0.4 (32.7)	1.1 (34.0)	3.1 (37.6)	−0.2 (31.6)
Average precipitation mm (inches)	142.9 (5.63)	140.8 (5.54)	107.1 (4.22)	48.2 (1.90)	6.2 (0.24)	3.7 (0.15)	3.6 (0.14)	8.3 (0.33)	19.8 (0.78)	52.5 (2.07)	55.0 (2.17)	121.3 (4.78)	709.4 (27.95)
Source: National Meteorology and Hydrology Service of Peru

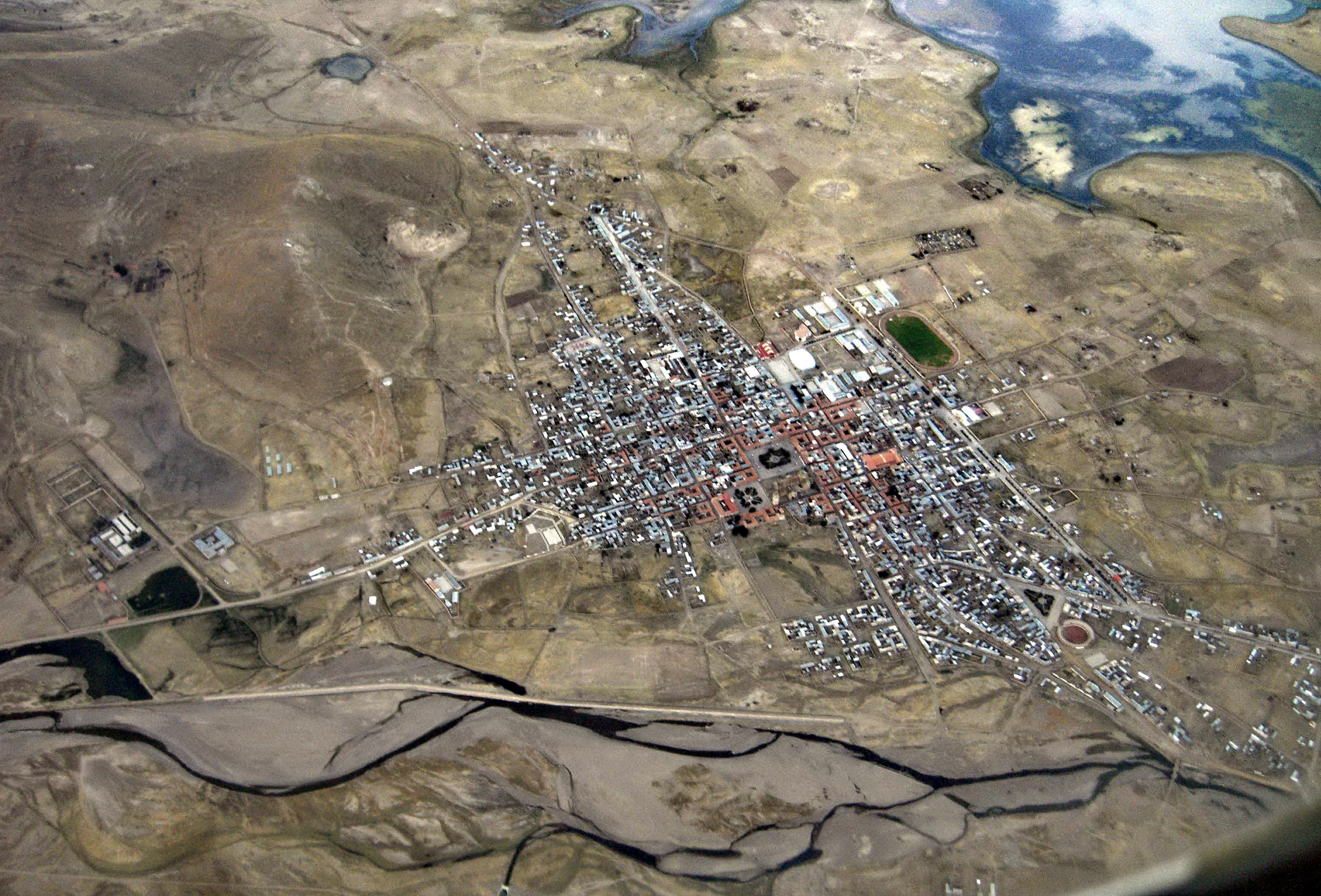
The town of Lampa and parts of the lake Pukaqucha as seen from the air
