= Vilavila District =

Coordinates: 15°11′38″S 70°40′27″W

Vilavila Wila Wila
- District
- Interactive map of Vilavila
- Country: Peru
- Region: Puno
- Province: Lampa
- Founded: May 2, 1854
- Capital: Vilavila

Government
  - Mayor: Justiniano Romulo Ahumada Viveros

Area
  - Total: 156.65 km^{2} (60.48 sq mi)
- Elevation: 4,300 m (14,100 ft)

Population (2005 census)
  - Total: 1,046
  - Density: 6.677/km^{2} (17.29/sq mi)
- Time zone: UTC-5 (PET)
- UBIGEO: 210710

Vilavila (in Hispanicized spelling) or Wila Wila (Aymara wila red, blood-red, the reduplication signifies that there is a group or a complex of something, "a complex of red color") is one of ten districts of the province Lampa in Peru.

== Geography ==
One of the highest peaks of the district is Pariwana at 5,022 m (16,476 ft). Other mountains are listed below:

- Achuqallani
- Llanqirani
- Pukarani
- Salla Pata
- Wallatani
- Wisa Wisa

== Ethnic groups ==
The people in the district are mainly indigenous citizens of Quechua descent. Quechua is the language which the majority of the population (98.12%) learnt to speak in childhood, while only 1.25% of the residents started speaking using the Spanish language (2007 Peru Census).
