= Kimsa Chuta =

Mountain in Peru

- Location within Peru

Highest point
- Elevation: 5,050 m (16,570 ft)
- Coordinates: 15°15′01″S 70°49′20″W

Geography
- Location: Peru
- Parent range: Andes

Kimsa Chuta (Aymara kimsa three, chuta end of a terrain, border; sign of the league, also spelled Quinsachota) is a mountain in the Andes of Peru, about 5,050 m (16,570 ft) high. It is located in the Puno Region, Lampa Province, Ocuviri District. Kimsa Chuta lies south of Lamparasi.
