= Nicasio District =

Coordinates: 15°14′31″S 70°15′54″W

Nicasio
- District
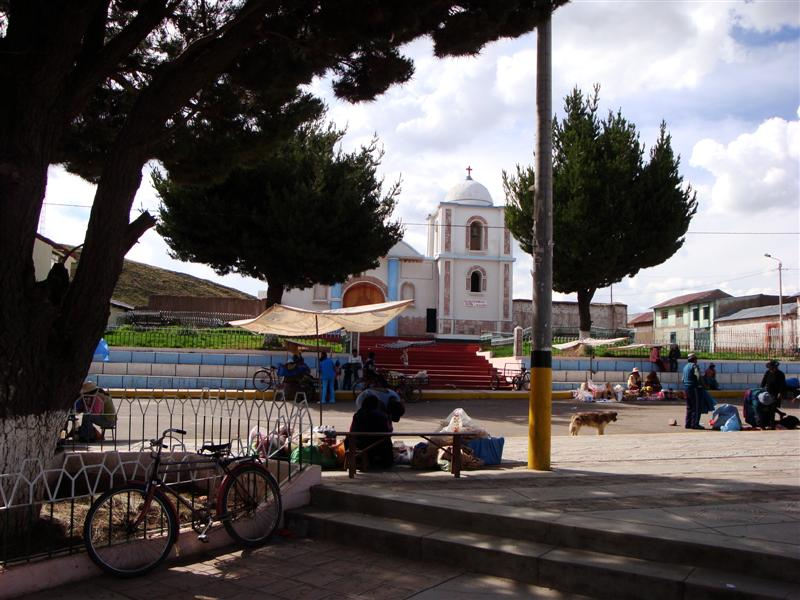
- Interactive map of Nicasio
- Country: Peru
- Region: Puno
- Province: Lampa
- Founded: May 2, 1854
- Capital: Nicasio

Government
  - Mayor: Wilfredo Salas Olgado

Area
  - Total: 134.35 km^{2} (51.87 sq mi)
- Elevation: 3,850 m (12,630 ft)

Population (2005 census)
  - Total: 2,864
  - Density: 21.32/km^{2} (55.21/sq mi)
- Time zone: UTC-5 (PET)
- UBIGEO: 210704

Nicasio District is one of ten districts of the province Lampa in Peru.

== Ethnic groups ==
The people in the district are mainly indigenous citizens of Quechua descent. Quechua is the language which the majority of the population (76.44%) learnt to speak in childhood, 23.07% of the residents started speaking using the Spanish language (2007 Peru Census).

== See also ==
- Intikancha
- Pukarani
