= Intikancha (Puno) =

Archaeological site in Peru

- Location within Peru

Highest point
- Elevation: 4,400 m (14,400 ft)
- Coordinates: 15°18′50″S 70°16′35″W

Geography
- Location: Peru, Puno Region, Lampa Province, San Román Province
- Parent range: Andes

Intikancha (Quechua inti sun, kancha enclosure, enclosed place, yard, a frame, or wall that encloses, "sun yard", Hispanicized spelling Inticancha) is a mountain with an archaeological site of the same name in the Andes of Peru, about 4,400 metres (14,436 ft) high. It is located in the Puno Region, Lampa Province, Nicasio District, and in the San Román Province, Juliaca District.

The archaeological site of Intikancha was declared a National Cultural Heritage by Resolución Directoral Nacional No. 79. It lies south of the mountain and archaeological site of Pukarani.
