= Cabana District, San Román =

Coordinates: 15°17′54″S 70°21′18″W

Cabana
- District
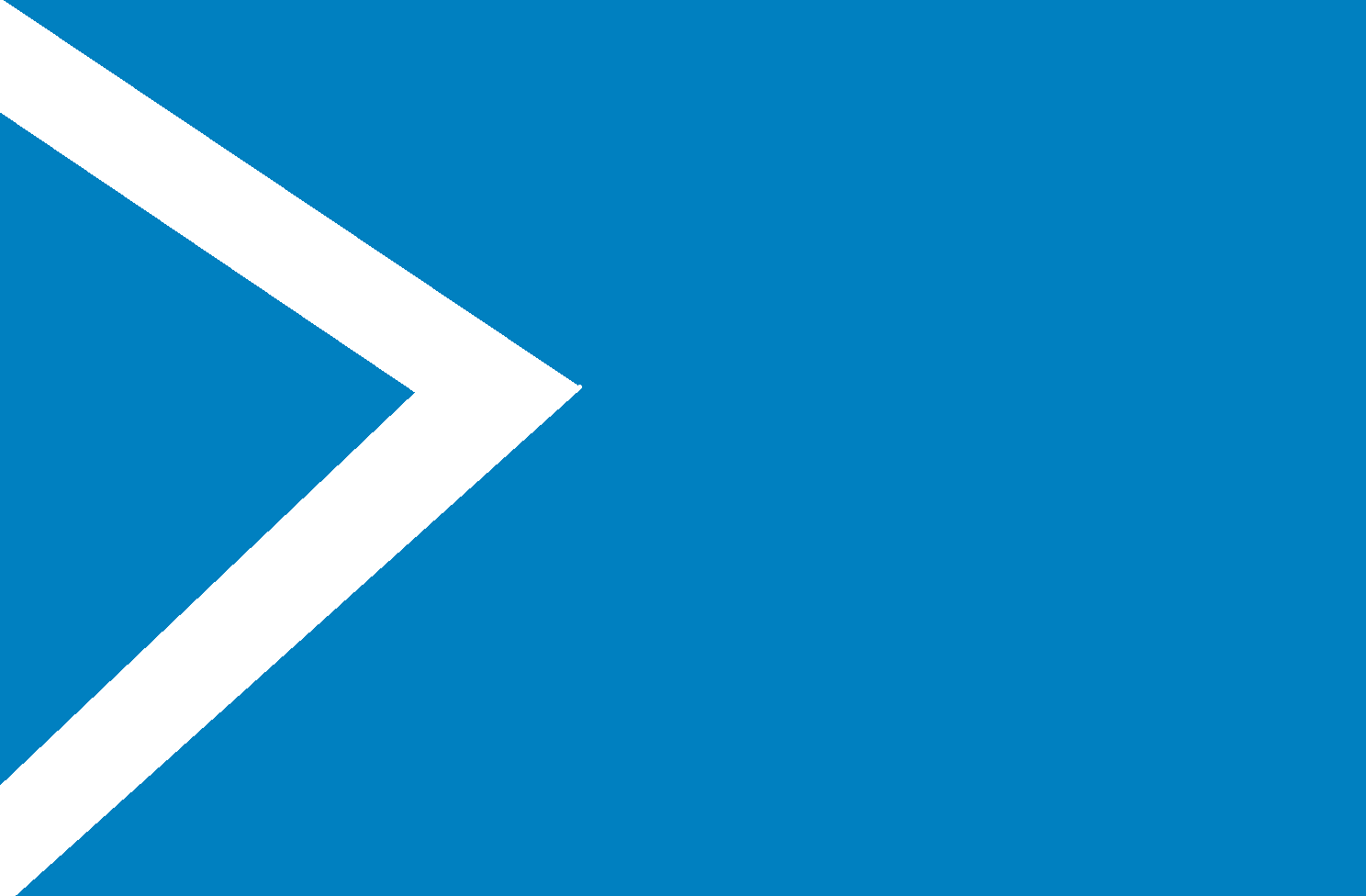
- Flag
- Interactive map of Cabana
- Country: Peru
- Region: Puno
- Province: San Román
- Capital: Cabana

Government
  - Mayor: Cesario Vilca Quispe

Area
  - Total: 191.23 km^{2} (73.83 sq mi)
- Elevation: 3,901 m (12,799 ft)

Population (2005 census)
  - Total: 4,602
  - Density: 24.07/km^{2} (62.33/sq mi)
- Time zone: UTC-5 (PET)
- UBIGEO: 211102

Cabana District is one of four districts of the province San Román in Peru.

== Ethnic groups ==
The people in the district are mainly indigenous citizens of Quechua descent. Quechua is the language which the majority of the population (66.28%) learnt to speak in childhood, 33.44% of the residents started speaking using the Spanish language (2007 Peru Census).
