= Cabanilla District =

Coordinates: 15°36′56″S 70°22′00″W

Cabanilla
- District
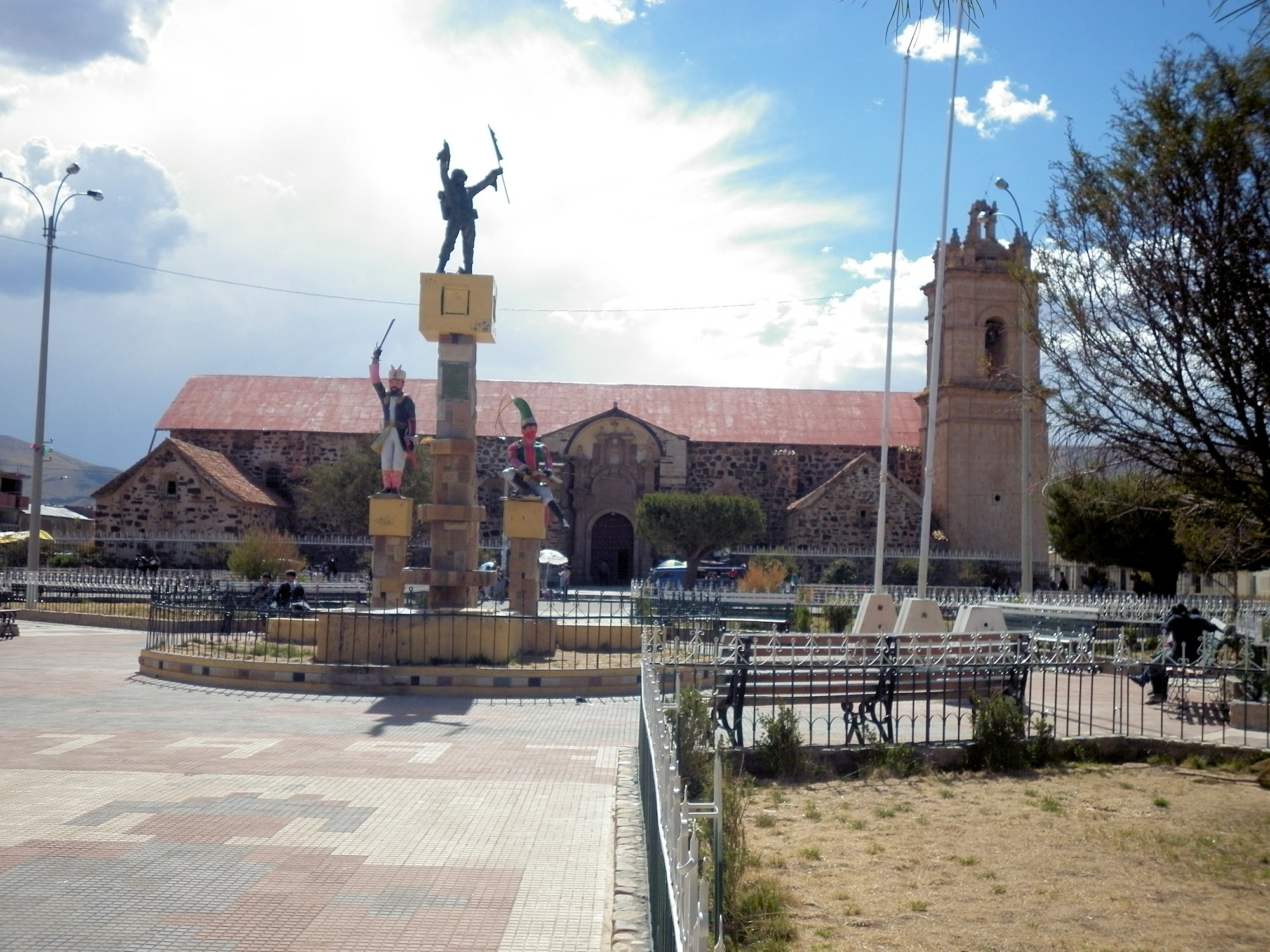
- Main square in Cabanilla
- Interactive map of Cabanilla
- Country: Peru
- Region: Puno
- Province: Lampa
- Capital: Cabanilla

Government
  - Mayor: Saturnino Calizaya Quisocala

Area
  - Total: 443.04 km^{2} (171.06 sq mi)
- Elevation: 3,876 m (12,717 ft)

Population (2005 census)
  - Total: 6,683
  - Density: 15.08/km^{2} (39.07/sq mi)
- Time zone: UTC-5 (PET)
- UBIGEO: 210702

Cabanilla District is one of ten districts of the province Lampa in Peru.

== Ethnic groups ==
The district's population consists mainly of indigenous citizens of Quechua descent. According to the 2007 Peru Census, Quechua was the first language learned by the majority of the population (61.21%), while 38.56% of the residents began speaking Spanish in childhood.

== See also ==
- Q'atawini
