= Kuntur Puñuna =

Mountain in Peru

- Location within Peru

Highest point
- Elevation: 4,800 m (15,700 ft)
- Coordinates: 15°37′19″S 70°45′42″W

Geography
- Location: Peru, Puno Region, Lampa Province
- Parent range: Andes

Kuntur Puñuna (quechua kuntur condor, puñuna bed, "condor bed", Hispanicized spelling Condor Puñuna) is a mountain in the Andes of Peru, about 4,800 metres (15,748 ft) high. It is located in the Puno Region, Lampa Province, Santa Lucía District.
