= Ocuviri District =

Coordinates: 15.1210°S 71.2096°W

Ocuviri
- District
- Interactive map of Ocuviri
- Country: Peru
- Region: Puno
- Province: Lampa
- Capital: Ocuviri

Government
  - Mayor: Mauro Cleto Quispe Calizaya

Area
  - Total: 878.26 km^{2} (339.10 sq mi)
- Elevation: 4,230 m (13,880 ft)

Population (2005 census)
  - Total: 2,244
  - Density: 2.555/km^{2} (6.618/sq mi)
- Time zone: UTC-5 (PET)
- UBIGEO: 210705

Ocuviri District is one of ten districts of the province Lampa in Peru.

== Geography ==
Some of the highest mountains of the district are listed below:

- Chata
- Chuqi
- Chuqi Pirwa
- Ch'ulla Rinri
- Kimsa Chuta
- Lamparasi
- Machu Kunturi
- Mich'i Mich'ini
- Pichaqani
- Puka Punchu
- Qaqa Chupa
- Qullqa Sirka
- Quylluni
- T'akra
- Urqun Thaki
- Warmi Sayana
- Willuni
- Wini Wini
- Yanawara

== Ethnic groups ==
The people in the district are mainly indigenous citizens of Quechua descent. Quechua is the language that the majority of the population (78.38%) learn to speak in childhood. 19.35% of the residents first learn to speak using the Spanish language (2007 Peru Census).
