= Caracoto District =

Coordinates: 15.5692°S 70.1072°W

Caracoto Qaraqutu
- District
- Interactive map of Caracoto
- Country: Peru
- Region: Puno
- Province: San Román
- Capital: Caracoto

Government
  - Mayor: Fredy Hector Silva Mamani

Area
  - Total: 285.87 km^{2} (110.38 sq mi)
- Elevation: 3,825 m (12,549 ft)

Population (2005 census)
  - Total: 7,570
  - Density: 26.5/km^{2} (68.6/sq mi)
- Time zone: UTC-5 (PET)
- UBIGEO: 211104

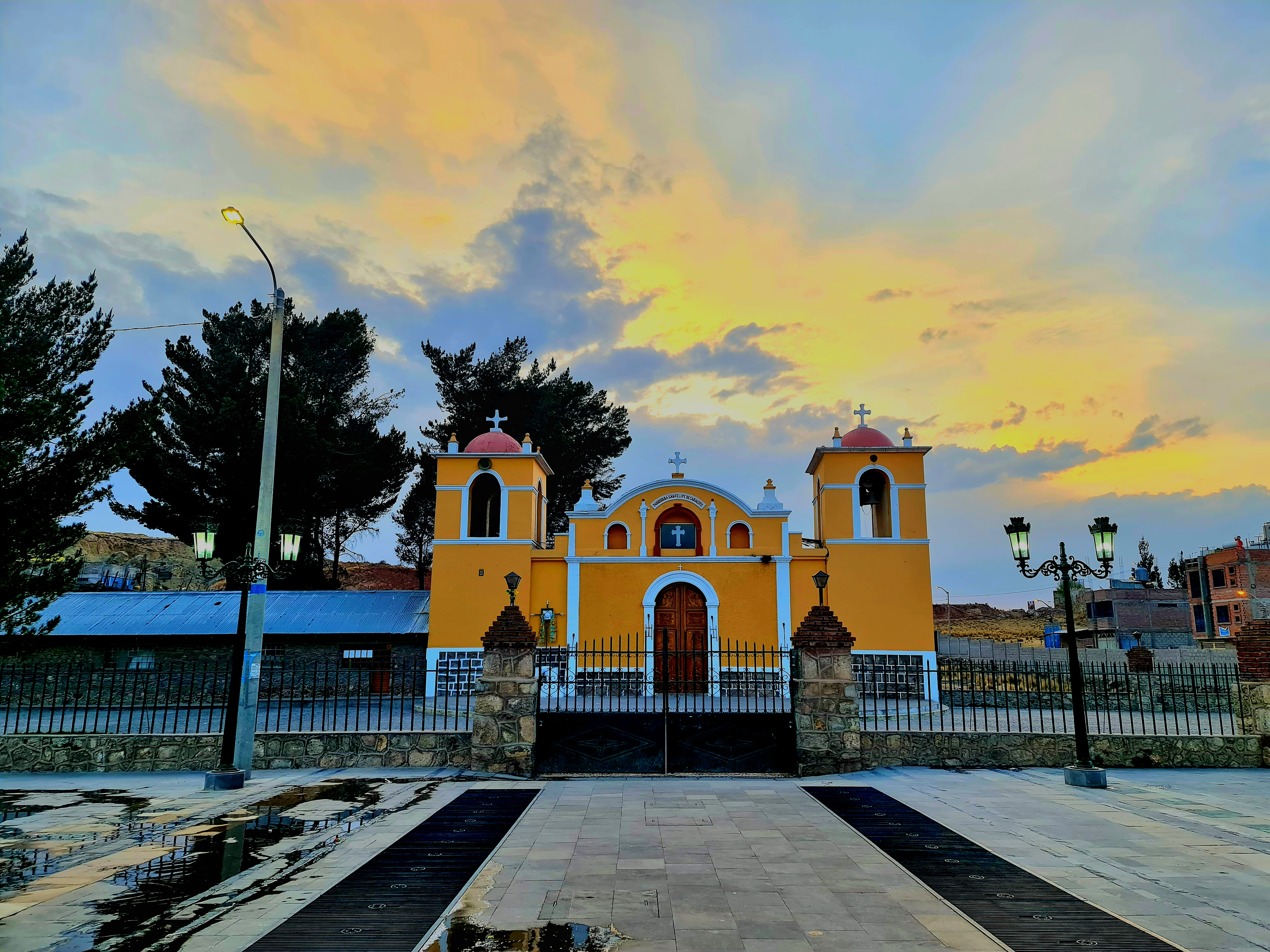
A monument in Caracoto, 2024

Caracoto District is one of four districts of the province San Román in Peru.

== Ethnic groups ==
The people in the district are mainly indigenous citizens of Quechua descent. Quechua is the language which the majority of the population (80.26%) learnt to speak in childhood, 18.67% of the residents started speaking using the Spanish language (2007 Peru Census).
