= Wini Wini =

Mountain in Peru

- Location within Peru

Highest point
- Elevation: 4,800 m (15,700 ft)
- Coordinates: 15°15′08″S 70°53′07″W

Geography
- Location: Peru, Puno Region
- Parent range: Andes

Wini Wini (Aymara wini a very heavy and hard stone used to work others, the reduplication indicates that there is a group or a complex of something, Hispanicized spelling Huini Huini) is a mountain in the Andes of Peru, about 4,800 metres (15,748 ft) high. It is situated in the Puno Region, Lampa Province, Ocuviri District.
