= Kuntur Sayana (Puno) =

Mountain in Peru

- Location within Peru

Highest point
- Elevation: 5,000 m (16,000 ft)
- Coordinates: 15°29′06″S 70°49′58″W

Geography
- Location: Peru, Puno Region, Lampa Province
- Parent range: Andes

Kuntur Sayana (Quechua kuntur condor, sayana stop, whereabouts, a place where you stop frequently, "condor stop", Hispanicized spelling Condorsayana) is a mountain in the Andes of Peru, about 5,000 metres (16,404 ft) high. It is located in the Puno Region, Lampa Province, Paratía District.
