= Kuntur Ikiña (Lampa) =

Mountain in Peru

- Location within Peru

Highest point
- Elevation: 4,800 m (15,700 ft)
- Coordinates: 15°27′58″S 70°29′58″W

Geography
- Location: Peru, Puno Region, Lampa Province
- Parent range: Andes

Kuntur Ikiña (Aymara kunturi condor, ikiña to sleep, Hispanicized spelling Condoriqueña) is a mountain in the Andes of Peru, about 4,800 metres (15,748 ft) high. It is located in the Puno Region, Lampa Province, Lampa District.
