= Waykira =

Mountain in Peru

- Location within Peru

Highest point
- Elevation: 5,200 m (17,100 ft)
- Coordinates: 15°20′50″S 70°42′33″W

Geography
- Location: Peru, Puno Region
- Parent range: Andes

Waykira (Aymara wayku gorge; mountain brook, ira mine, "gorge mine" or "mountain brook mine", also spelled Huayquera) is a mountain in the Andes of Peru, about 5,200 metres (17,060 ft) high. It is located in the Puno Region, Lampa Province, on the border of the districts Palca and Paratía. Waykira lies southeast of the mountain Qillqa and south of Hatun Pastu.
