= Mich'i Mich'ini =

Mountain in Peru

- Location within Peru

Highest point
- Elevation: 4,826 m (15,833 ft)
- Coordinates: 15°10′25″S 70°50′30″W

Geography
- Location: Peru, Puno Region
- Parent range: Andes

Mich'i Mich'ini (Aymara mich'i bow, the reduplication indicates that there is a group or a complex of something, -ni a suffix to indicate ownership, "the one with many bows", also spelled Michimichini) is a 4,826-metre-high (15,833 ft) mountain in the Andes of Peru. It is situated in the Puno Region, Lampa Province, Ocuviri District.
