= Juliaca District =

Coordinates: 15.5026°S 70.1334°W

Juliaca
- District
- Interactive map of Juliaca
- Country: Peru
- Region: Puno
- Province: San Román
- Capital: Juliaca

Government
  - Mayor: David Sucacahua Yucra (2019-2022)

Area
  - Total: 533.47 km^{2} (205.97 sq mi)
- Elevation: 3,824 m (12,546 ft)

Population (2017)
  - Total: 228,726
  - Density: 428.75/km^{2} (1,110.5/sq mi)
- Time zone: UTC-5 (PET)
- UBIGEO: 211101

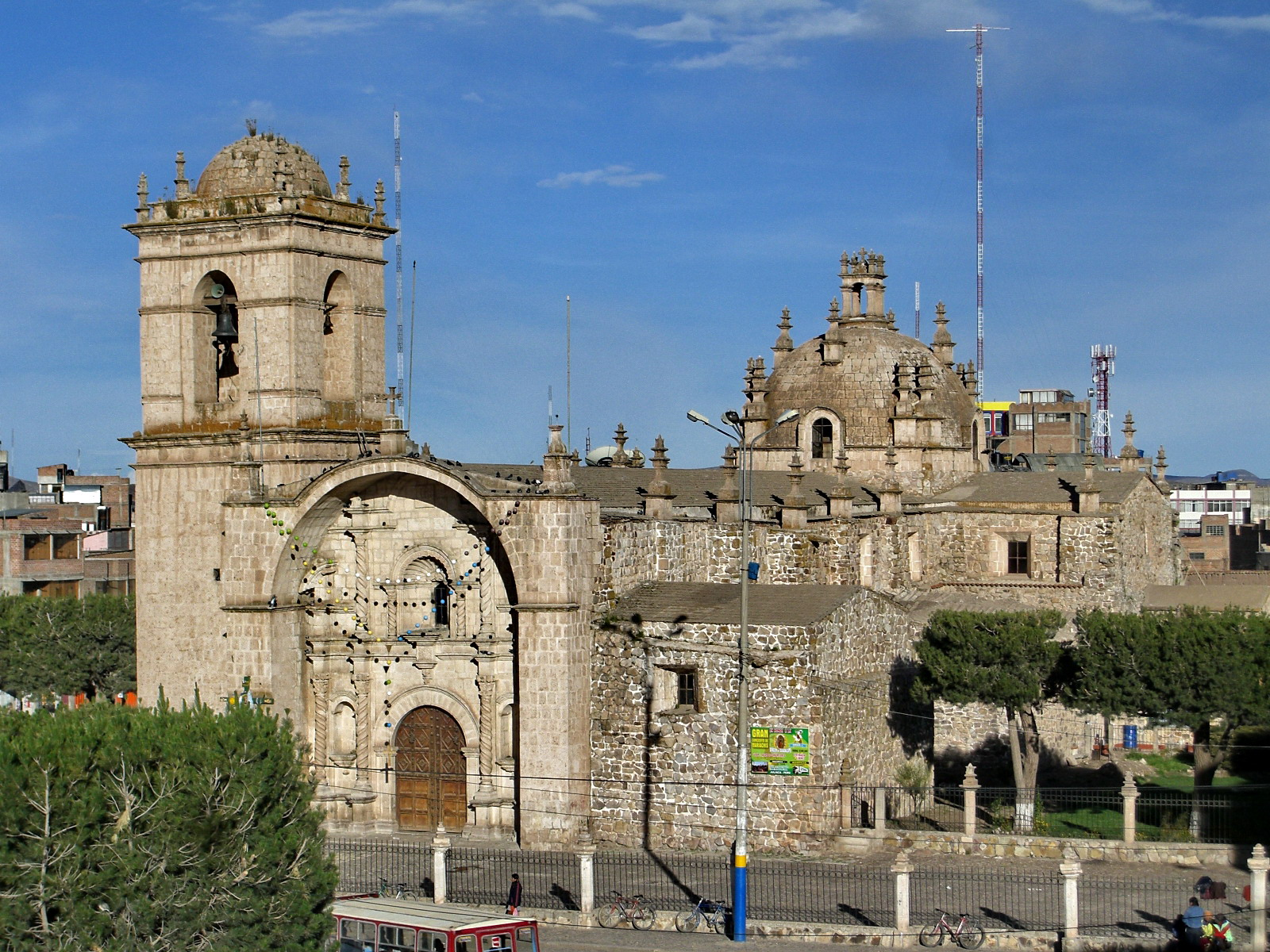

Juliaca District is one of four districts of the province San Román in Peru. Its seat is Juliaca.

== See also ==
- Intikancha
