= Hatun Pastu =

Mountain in Peru

- Location within Peru

Highest point
- Elevation: 5,170 m (16,960 ft)
- Coordinates: 15°19′35″S 70°42′28″W

Geography
- Location: Peru, Puno Region, Lampa Province
- Parent range: Andes

Climbing
- First ascent: 1972 via S. slope

Hatun Pastu (Quechua hatun big, pastu grass (a borrowing from Spanish pasto) also spelled Jatun Pasto) is a mountain in the Andes of Peru, about 5,170 metres (16,962 ft) high. It is located in the Puno Region, Lampa Province, on the border of the districts Palca and Paratía, southeast of the mountain Qillqa and north of Waykira.

An intermittent stream named Hatun Pastu originates north of the mountain. It is a tributary of the river Wila Wila (Vila Vila) whose waters flow to Lake Titicaca.

== See also ==
- Yanawara
