= Cabanillas District =

Coordinates: 15.6412°S 70.3492°W

Cabanillas
- District
- Interactive map of Cabanillas
- Country: Peru
- Region: Puno
- Province: San Román
- Founded: February 28, 1958
- Capital: Deustua

Government
  - Mayor: Jesús Quispe Mamani

Area
  - Total: 1,267.06 km^{2} (489.21 sq mi)
- Elevation: 3,885 m (12,746 ft)

Population (2005 census)
  - Total: 5,658
  - Density: 4.465/km^{2} (11.57/sq mi)
- Time zone: UTC-5 (PET)
- UBIGEO: 211103

Cabanillas District is one of four districts of the San Román Province in Peru.

== History ==
The district was created by Law No. 12963 of February 28, 1958, in the government of President Manuel Prado y Ugarteche. Despite its recent political creation, the history of culture is ancient Cabanillas. "Like other places was settled, planted, inhabited and abandoned since the time auroral Asian invasions until the fateful and glorious times" (PZB p. 19). Testimonials Preínka cultural development are Pukarilla chullpas, Huertas, Inkapaqarita and Pukaqaqa. In the Inca Empire flourished under the imperial yoke, and during Spanish colonial seal was reflected in the mass domination of foreign surnames. Tired of oppression, the people of this territory also joined the rebellion of Tupac Amaru, whose inhabitants led by the hero Juan Mamani offered their blood for the sake of freedom. In the first decades of the Republic's territory was taken by Cabanillas gamonalismo whose land by nearly 80% became part of the estates. Some documents in the dawn of the Republic referred to in the vicinity of the present capital district, had already settled some families, because in that area there was a bridge connecting the towns of Cabana and Cabanillas, including that the bridge would have been rebuilt thanks to the philanthropic gesture of Juan Bustamante in the year of 1850. This attracted more people there with afincaran villages or huts forming. Thanks to this bridge is that this sector does play a role, and subsequent nineteenth century authorities concerned to improve this item vial initially gave social force, and they christened Cabanillas. Deustua, which is the present capital of the district, resurfaced thanks to this place, back in year 1873, the company of Henry Meiggs, has determined install Cabanillas Railway Station, which brought together people from diverse backgrounds. This railroad next to the road between the cities of Juliaca and Arequipa gave progressive social personality. The district capital takes this name to perpetuate the memory of General Alejandro Deustua who served as Prefect of Puno department between 1848 and 1851. By decree of May 2, 1854 Don Ramon Castilla joined the Province of Cercado de Puno to Cabana district which was part Cabanillas. The December 5, 1908 the President Augusto B. Legui'a enacted by Law No. 904 which moved the district capital of the emerging Cabana Deustua town. In this condition the 6th of September, 1926, under Law No. 5463 Cabana district becomes part of the new province of San Roman. The February 28, 1958 promulgating the Law No. 12963 which splits the Cabana District, creating the new district officially with its capital Deustua Cabanillas. (See Appendix No. 18). Today is a small but modern with basic services running, with active social life without losing its breath country. The paved road linking the cities of Juliaca and Arequipa comes giving a face advanced.

== Geography ==
One of the highest peaks of the district is Kunturi at approximately 4,800 m (15,700 ft). Other mountains are listed below:

- Allqamarini
- Anta Salla
- Asiruni
- Atuq Wachana
- Chawpi Kapilla Salla
- Chuku
- Chuqi Karpa
- Chuqi Llusk'a
- Jichu Qullu
- Jisk'a Taruja
- Kampanani
- Kiwichata
- Kuntur Puñuna
- K'ark'arani
- Muru Qaqa
- Pacha Quta
- Paraxra
- Pawsa Pata
- Pilluni
- Puka Paraxra
- Pukara
- Putusi
- Qala Qala
- Qullpa Uma
- Qullpa Urqu
- Qullqirani
- Qurini
- Q'atawi Tira
- Q'uwa Llaqi
- Saywa
- Tarujani
- Uqi Muqu
- Urqu Runasqa
- Wankarani
- Waña Pata
- Waqra
- Wichhu Qullu
- Wila Sirka
- Wila Wila
- Wira Wira
- Wiska Muqu
- Wisk'achani
- Yana Pukyu
- Yana Salla
- Yana Saywa
- Yana Urqu
- Yuraq Apachita
- Yuraq Qaqa

== Climate ==
Climate data for Cabanillas, elevation 3,885 m (12,746 ft), (1991–2020)
Month	Jan	Feb	Mar	Apr	May	Jun	Jul	Aug	Sep	Oct	Nov	Dec	Year
Mean daily maximum °C (°F)	16.2 (61.2)	15.9 (60.6)	16.0 (60.8)	16.2 (61.2)	16.5 (61.7)	15.9 (60.6)	15.9 (60.6)	16.6 (61.9)	17.4 (63.3)	18.0 (64.4)	18.6 (65.5)	17.6 (63.7)	16.7 (62.1)
Mean daily minimum °C (°F)	4.8 (40.6)	4.9 (40.8)	4.5 (40.1)	3.1 (37.6)	0.8 (33.4)	−1.1 (30.0)	−1.6 (29.1)	−0.3 (31.5)	1.8 (35.2)	3.2 (37.8)	4.1 (39.4)	4.6 (40.3)	2.4 (36.3)
Average precipitation mm (inches)	142.3 (5.60)	140.0 (5.51)	103.2 (4.06)	50.0 (1.97)	4.7 (0.19)	2.6 (0.10)	2.7 (0.11)	7.6 (0.30)	17.5 (0.69)	45.8 (1.80)	56.7 (2.23)	111.0 (4.37)	684.1 (26.93)
Source: National Meteorology and Hydrology Service of Peru

== See also ==
- Saraqucha
- Sayt'uqucha
