= Luntu Luntuni =

Mountain in Peru

- Location within Peru

Highest point
- Elevation: 4,585.1 m (15,043 ft)
- Coordinates: 15°16′6″S 70°36′52″W

Geography
- Location: Peru, Puno Region, Lampa Province
- Parent range: Andes

Luntu Luntuni (Hispanicized spelling Lunto Luntune) is a mountain in the Andes of southern Peru, about 4,585.1 metres (15,043 ft) high. It is situated in the Puno Region, Lampa Province, Palca District, south-west of Palca.
