= Wisa Wisa (Lampa-Melgar) =

Mountain in Peru

- Location within Peru

Highest point
- Elevation: 4,849.4 m (15,910 ft)
- Coordinates: 15°8′13″S 70°35′16″W

Geography
- Location: Peru, Puno Region, Lampa Province, Melgar Province
- Parent range: Andes

Wisa Wisa (Aymara wisa first born twin, Quechua wiksa, wisa belly, the reduplication indicates that there is a group or a complex of something, Hispanicized spelling Visa Visa) is a mountain in the Andes of Peru, about 4,849.4 metres (15,910 ft) high. It is situated in the Puno Region, Lampa Province, Vilavila District, and in the Melgar Province, Ayaviri District. Wisa Wisa lies near the mountains Pukarani (Pucarani) in the northwest and Wallatani (Huallatane) in the southeast, southwest of a place called Wisa Wisa (Huisa Huisa).
