= Lampa District, Lampa =

Coordinates: 15°21′48″S 70°21′58″W

Lampa
- District
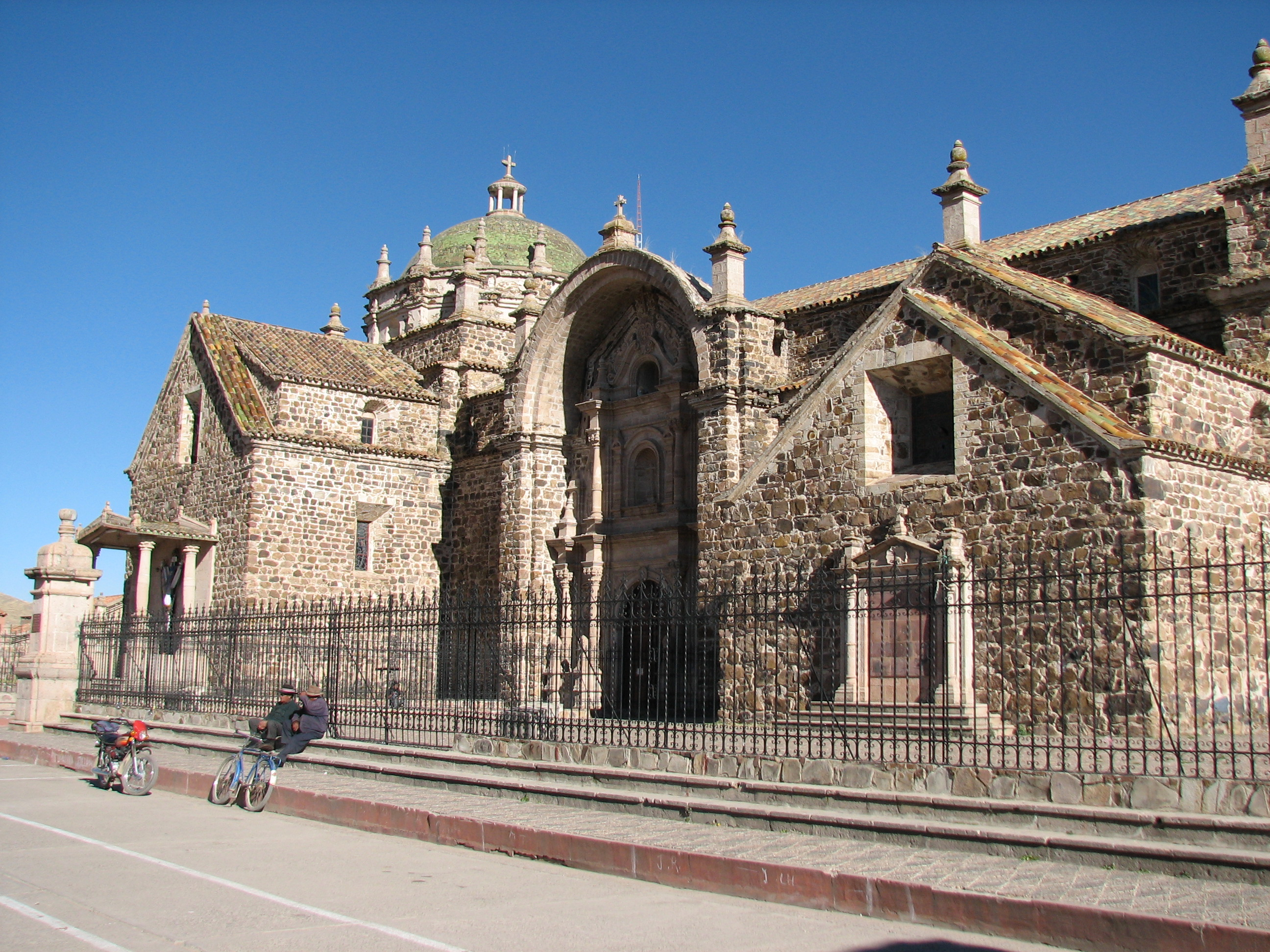
- Inmaculada Concepción church in Lampa
- Interactive map of Lampa
- Country: Peru
- Region: Puno
- Province: Lampa
- Capital: Lampa

Government
  - Mayor: Ciriaco Isidro Diaz Arestegui

Area
  - Total: 675.82 km^{2} (260.94 sq mi)
- Elevation: 3,892 m (12,769 ft)

Population (2017)
  - Total: 11,206
  - Density: 16.581/km^{2} (42.945/sq mi)
- Time zone: UTC-5 (PET)
- UBIGEO: 210701

Lampa District is one of ten districts of the province Lampa in Peru.

== Ethnic groups ==
The people in the district are mainly indigenous citizens of Quechua descent. Quechua is the language which the majority of the population (74.17%) learnt to speak in childhood, 25.32% of the residents started speaking using the Spanish language (2007 Peru Census).

== Climate ==
Climate data for Lampa, elevation 3,866 m (12,684 ft), (1991–2020)
Month	Jan	Feb	Mar	Apr	May	Jun	Jul	Aug	Sep	Oct	Nov	Dec	Year
Mean daily maximum °C (°F)	16.4 (61.5)	16.2 (61.2)	16.2 (61.2)	16.5 (61.7)	16.5 (61.7)	15.9 (60.6)	16.0 (60.8)	16.8 (62.2)	17.7 (63.9)	18.1 (64.6)	18.8 (65.8)	17.8 (64.0)	16.9 (62.4)
Mean daily minimum °C (°F)	4.2 (39.6)	4.3 (39.7)	3.8 (38.8)	1.5 (34.7)	−3.0 (26.6)	−5.6 (21.9)	−5.9 (21.4)	−4.5 (23.9)	−1.8 (28.8)	0.4 (32.7)	1.1 (34.0)	3.1 (37.6)	−0.2 (31.6)
Average precipitation mm (inches)	142.9 (5.63)	140.8 (5.54)	107.1 (4.22)	48.2 (1.90)	6.2 (0.24)	3.7 (0.15)	3.6 (0.14)	8.3 (0.33)	19.8 (0.78)	52.5 (2.07)	55.0 (2.17)	121.3 (4.78)	709.4 (27.95)
Source: National Meteorology and Hydrology Service of Peru

== See also ==
- Kuntur Ikiña
- Pukaqucha
