= Calapuja District =

Coordinates: 15°19′04″S 70°13′27″W

Calapuja
- District
- Interactive map of Calapuja
- Country: Peru
- Region: Puno
- Province: Lampa
- Founded: May 2, 1854
- Capital: Calapuja

Government
  - Mayor: Andres Avelino Barrantes Yucra

Area
  - Total: 141.3 km^{2} (54.6 sq mi)
- Elevation: 3,843 m (12,608 ft)

Population (2005 census)
  - Total: 2,175
  - Density: 15.39/km^{2} (39.87/sq mi)
- Time zone: UTC-5 (PET)
- UBIGEO: 210703

Calapuja District is one of ten districts of the province Lampa in Peru.

== Ethnic groups ==
The people in the district are mainly indigenous citizens of Quechua descent. Quechua is the language which the majority of the population (80.35%) learnt to speak in childhood, 19.44% of the residents started speaking using the Spanish language (2007 Peru Census).
