= Chunkara (Puno) =

Mountain in Peru

- Location within Peru

Highest point
- Elevation: 5,000 m (16,000 ft)
- Coordinates: 15°33′58″S 70°47′56″W

Naming
- Language of name: Quechua

Geography
- Location: Peru, Puno Region, Lampa Province
- Parent range: Andes

Chunkara (Aymara for "pointed mountain", Hispanicized spelling Chungara) is a mountain in the Sillapaka mountain range in the Andes of Peru, about 5,000 m (16,404 ft) high . It is located in the Puno Region, Lampa Province, Paratia District, northeast of Sillapaka.
