= Pukarani (Peru) =

Archaeological site in Peru

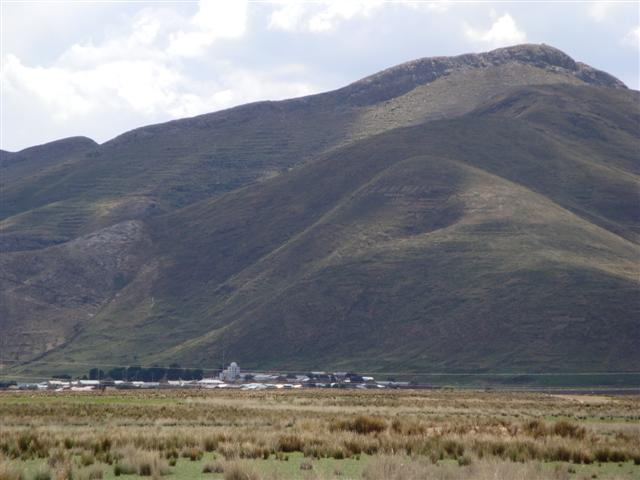
- The village of Nicasio with Pukarani in the background

Highest point
- Elevation: 4,301.9 m (14,114 ft)
- Coordinates: 15°14′28″S 70°16′40″W

Geography
- Location within Peru
- Location: Peru, Puno Region, Lampa Province
- Parent range: Andes

Pukarani (Aymara pukara fortress or a mountain of protection, -ni a suffix to indicate ownership, "the one with a fortress", Hispanicized spelling Pucarani) is a mountain with an archaeological site of the same name in the Andes of Peru, about 4,301.9 m (14,114 ft) high. It is located in the Puno Region, Lampa Province, Nicasio District.

The archaeological site of Pukarani was declared a National Cultural Heritage by Resolución Directoral Nacional No. 79. It lies north of the mountain and archaeological site of Intikancha.
