= Machu Kunturi =

Mountain in Peru

- Pampachuku
- Location within Peru

Highest point
- Elevation: 5,100 m (16,700 ft)
- Coordinates: 15°18′51″S 70°47′29″W

Geography
- Location: Peru
- Parent range: Andes

Machu Kunturi (Quechua machu old, old person, Aymara kunturi condor, "old condor", Hispanicized spelling Macho Condori) or Pampachuku (Pampachuco) is a mountain in the Andes of Peru, about 5,100 metres (16,732 ft) high. It is located in the Puno Region, Lampa Province, Ocuviri District. Machu Kunturiri lies between the mountain Pichaqani in the west and Qillqa in the east.
