= Lampa province =

Coordinates: 15°25′S 70°35′W

Lampa
- Province
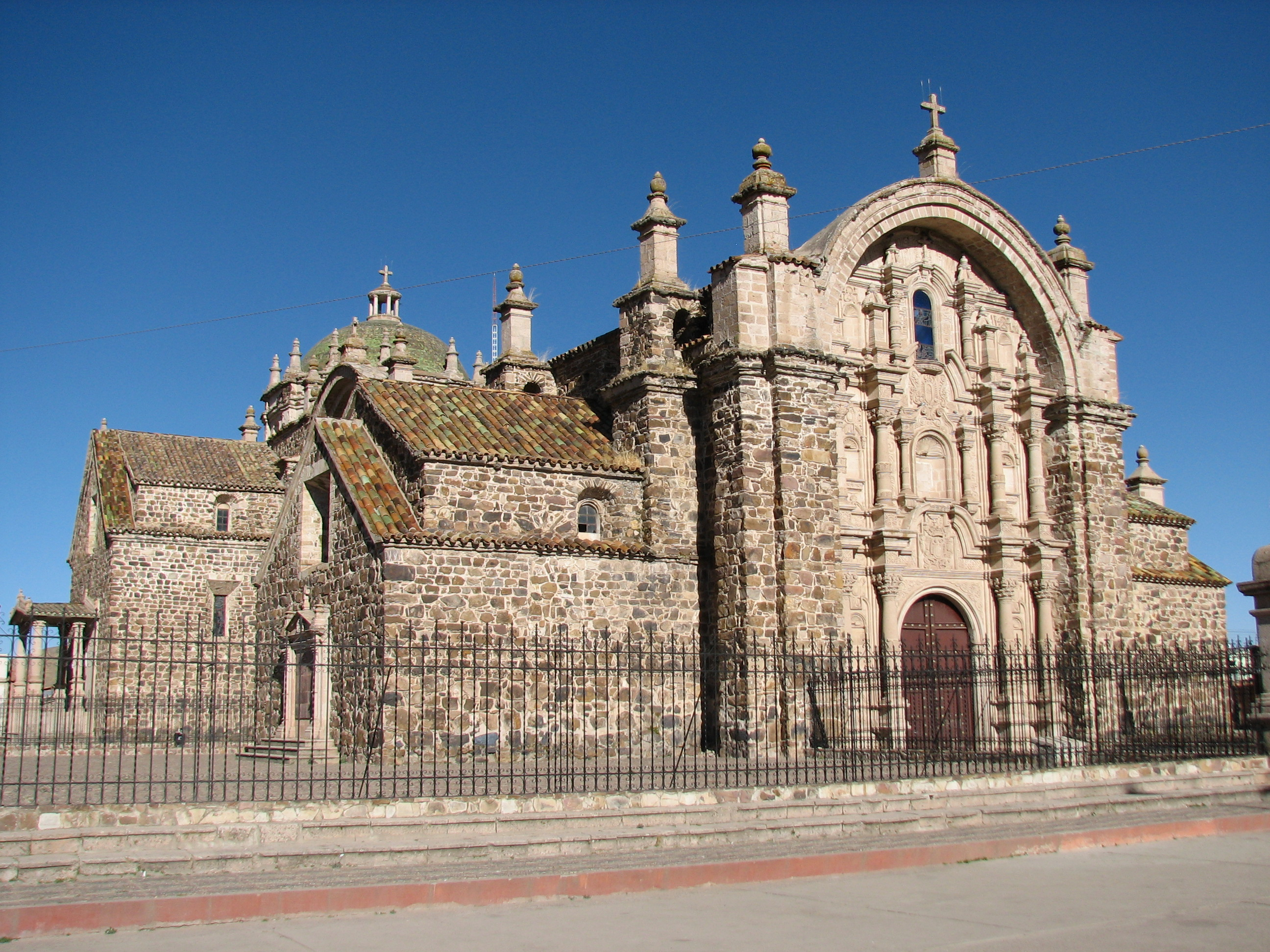
- Inmaculada Concepción church in Lampa

- Coat of arms

- Location of Lampa in the Puno Region
- Country: Peru
- Region: Puno
- Capital: Lampa

Government
  - Mayor: Ciriaco Isidro Díaz Arestegui (2019-2022)

Area
  - Total: 5,991.73 km^{2} (2,313.42 sq mi)
- Elevation: 3,892 m (12,769 ft)

Population
  - Total: 40,856
  - Density: 6.8187/km^{2} (17.660/sq mi)
- UBIGEO: 2107
- Website: www.munilampa.gob.pe

Lampa is a province of the Puno Region in Peru. Its population is about 40,856. The capital is Lampa.

== Geography ==
The Sillapaka mountain range traverses the province. Some of the highest mountains of the province are listed below:

- Amayani
- Anka Wachana
- Anta Q'awa
- Aqu P'ukru
- Awallani
- Chata
- Chunkara
- Chuqi
- Chuqi Pirwa
- Ch'ulla Rinri
- Hatun Pastu
- Hatun Q'asa
- Illani
- Janq'uyu
- Jayu Laqhi
- Kimsa Chata
- Kimsa Chuta
- Kirani
- Kuntur Ikiña
- Kuntur Puñuna
- Kuntur Sayana
- Kuntur Uma
- Kuntur Wasi
- Kunturi
- Lamparasi
- Luntu Luntuni
- Machu Kunturi
- Mamañawi
- Mich'i Mich'ini
- Pachakutiq
- Pariwana
- Pichaqani
- Puka Punchu
- Pukara
- Phisqa Tira
- P'isqi Punta
- Qaqa Chupa
- Qillqa
- Qillwayuq
- Qullqa Sirka
- Qullqi
- Quylluni
- Q'atawini
- Sayt'u
- T'akra
- Urqun Thaki
- Uturunqani
- Wankara
- Wankarani
- Warmi Sayana
- Waykira
- Willuni
- Wini Wini
- Wira Apachita
- Wisa Wisa
- Yanawara (Ananta)
- Yanawara (Palca-Paratía)
- Yanawara (Paratía)
- Yaritayuq
- Yuraq Apachita

== Political division ==
The province has an area of 5,791.73 square kilometers (2,236.20 sq mi) and is split into ten districts.

- Cabanilla
- Calapuja
- Lampa
- Nicasio
- Ocuviri
- Palca
- Paratia
- Pucará
- Santa Lucía
- Vilavila

== Ethnic groups ==
The people in the province are mainly indigenous citizens of Quechua descent. As of 2007, Quechua was the first language of 74.56% of the population; Spanish of 24.84%; and Aymara of 0.37%.

== See also ==
- Intikancha
- La Raya mountain range
- Pukaqucha
- Pukara
- Pukarani
- Sayt'uqucha
- Suyt'uqucha
