= Pukaqucha (Puno) =

Lake in Peru

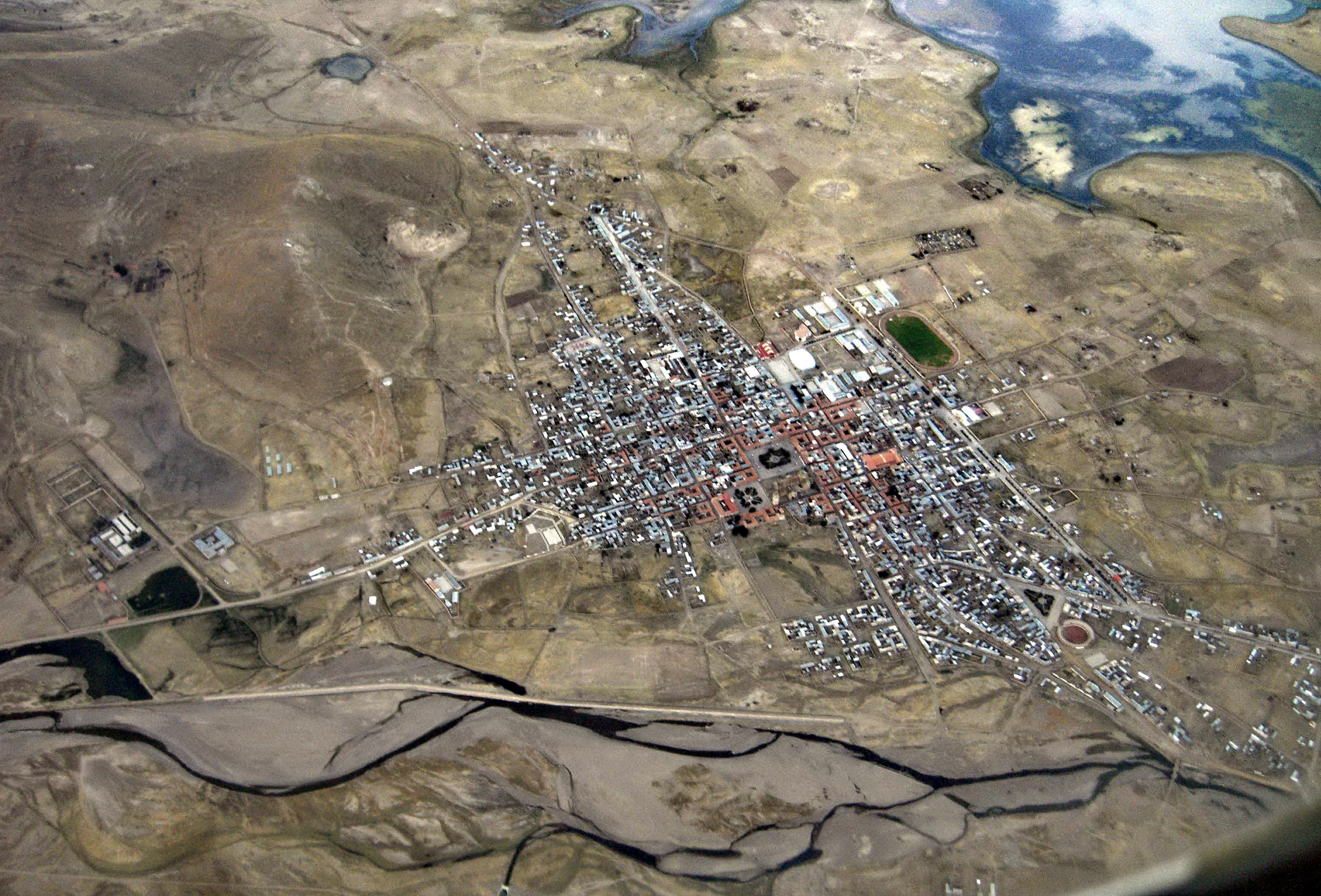
- Lampa and parts of the lake Pukaqucha as seen from the air

- Location within Peru
- Location: Peru; Puno Region, Lampa Province
- Coordinates: 15°21′34″S 70°21′2″W

Pukaqucha (Quechua puka red, colored, qucha lake, "red lake" or "colored lake", hispanicized spellings Pucacocha, Pucaccocha, also known as Laguna Colorada as translated into Spanish) is a lake in the Puno Region in southern Peru. It is situated in the Lampa Province, Lampa District, east of Lampa.
