= Puka Punchu (Puno) =

Mountain in Peru

- Location within Peru

Highest point
- Elevation: 5,000 m (16,000 ft)
- Coordinates: 15°19′40″S 70°57′20″W

Geography
- Location: Peru, Puno Region, Lampa Province
- Parent range: Andes

Puka Punchu (Quechua puka red, punchu poncho, "red poncho" or "silver ravine", Hispanicized spelling Pucapuncho) is a mountain in the Andes of Peru, about 5,000 m (16,000 ft) high. It is situated in the Puno Region, Lampa Province, on the border of the districts of Ocuviri and Santa Lucía. Puka Punchu lies southeast of Qullqi Q'awa.
