= Palca District, Lampa =

Coordinates: 15°19′20″S 70°36′18″W

Palca P'allqa
- District
- Interactive map of Palca
- Country: Peru
- Region: Puno
- Province: Lampa
- Founded: October 25, 1901
- Capital: Palca

Government
  - Mayor: Andres Vilca Mamani

Area
  - Total: 483.96 km^{2} (186.86 sq mi)
- Elevation: 4,020 m (13,190 ft)

Population (2005 census)
  - Total: 2,105
  - Density: 4.350/km^{2} (11.27/sq mi)
- Time zone: UTC-5 (PET)
- UBIGEO: 210706

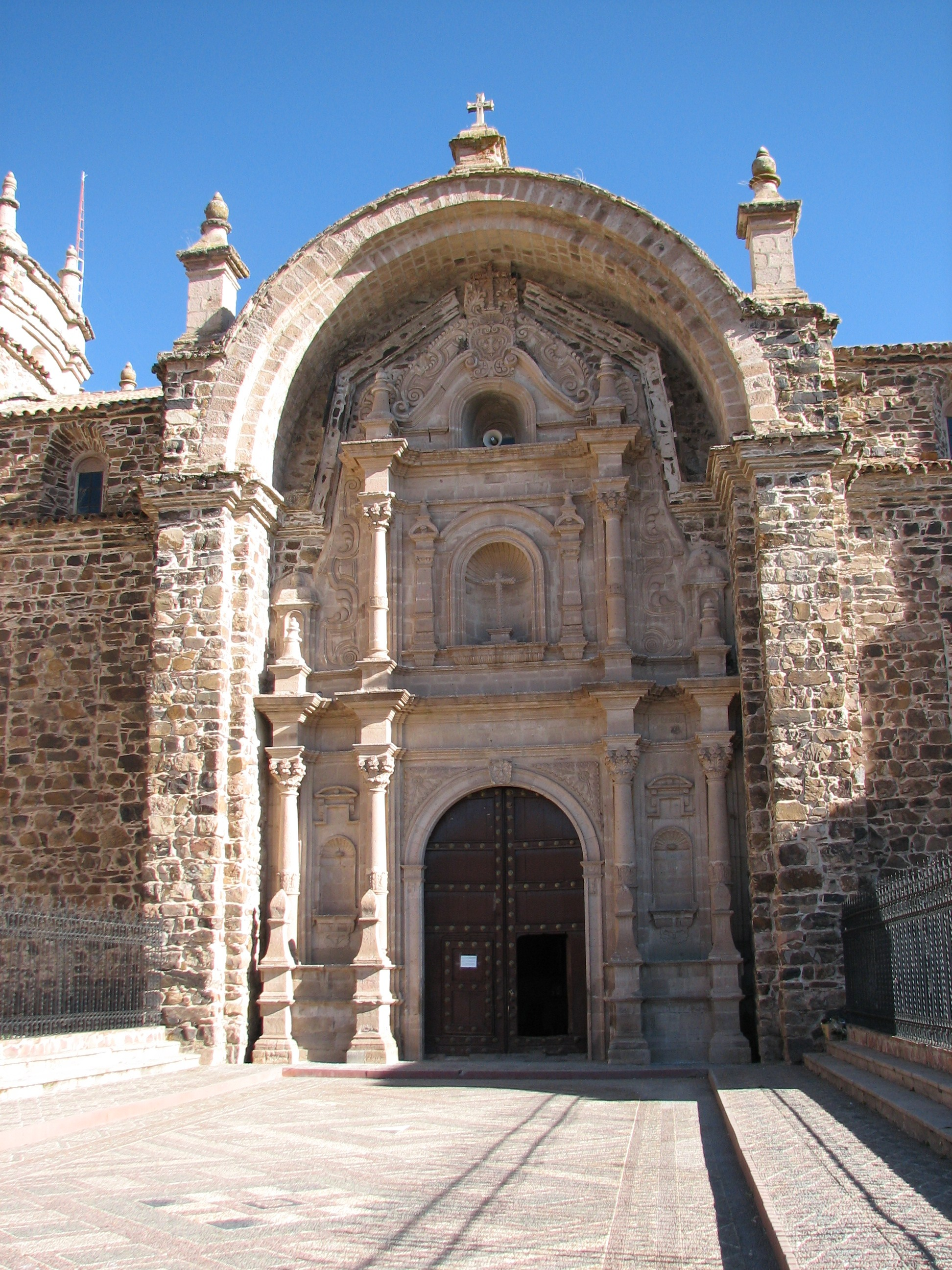
Church in Lampa Peru

Palca District is one of ten districts of the province Lampa in Peru.

== Geography ==
Some of the highest mountains of the district are listed below:

- Hatun Pastu
- Luntu Luntuni
- Pariwana
- Pirwani
- Qillqa
- Saywa
- Wankarani
- Waykira
- Wira Apachita
- Wisa Wisa
- Yanawara (Palca-Paratía)
- Yanawara (Paratía)
- Yaritayuq

== Ethnic groups ==
The people in the district are mainly indigenous citizens of Quechua descent. Quechua is the language which the majority of the population (82.61%) learnt to speak in childhood, 16.83% of the residents started speaking using the Spanish language (2007 Peru Census).
