= Q'atawini =

Mountain in Peru

- Location within Peru

Highest point
- Elevation: 4,800 m (15,700 ft)
- Coordinates: 15°32′04″S 70°29′15″W

Geography
- Location: Peru, Puno Region, Lampa Province
- Parent range: Andes

Q'atawini (Aymara q'atawi lime, -ni a suffix to indicate ownership, "the one with lime", Hispanicized spelling Catahuini) is a mountain in the Andes of Peru, about 4,800 metres (15,748 ft) high. It is located in the Puno Region, Lampa Province, on the border of the districts Cabanilla and Santa Lucía.
