= Awallani =

Mountain in Peru

- Location within Peru

Highest point
- Elevation: 4,800 m (15,700 ft)
- Coordinates: 15°33′26″S 70°34′34″W

Geography
- Location: Peru, Puno Region, Lampa Province
- Parent range: Andes

Awallani (Aymara awalla the first one of two newborn girl, -ni a suffix to indicate ownership, "the one with the first one of two newborn girl", Hispanicized spelling Aguallane) is a mountain in the Andes of Peru, about 4,800 metres (15,748 ft) high. It is located in the Puno Region, Lampa Province, on the border of the districts Paratía and Santa Lucía. Awallani lies between the mountains Phisqa Tira in the northeast and Pukasalla in the southwest.
