= Phisqa Tira =

Mountain in Peru

- Location within Peru

Highest point
- Elevation: 5,000 m (16,000 ft)
- Coordinates: 15°32′13″S 70°33′02″W

Geography
- Location: Peru, Puno Region, Lampa Province
- Parent range: Andes

Phisqa Tira (Aymara phisqa five, tira cradle, "five cradles", Hispanicized spelling Piscatira) is a mountain in the Andes of Peru, about 5,000 metres (16,404 ft) high. It is located in the Puno Region, Lampa Province, on the border of the districts Paratía and Santa Lucía. Phisqa Tira lies northeast of the mountain Awallani.
