= Yanawara (Ananta) =

Mountain in Peru

- Location within Peru

Highest point
- Elevation: 5,000 m (16,000 ft)
- Coordinates: 15°22′12″S 70°48′36″W

Geography
- Location: Peru
- Parent range: Andes

Yanawara (in the local language, also spelled Yanahuara) is a mountain in the Andes of Peru, about 5,000 metres (16,404 ft) high. It is located in the Puno Region, Lampa Province, on the border of the districts Ocuviri, Paratía and Santa Lucía. Yanawara lies east of Ananta Lake.
