= Lake Lagunillas =

Lake in Peru

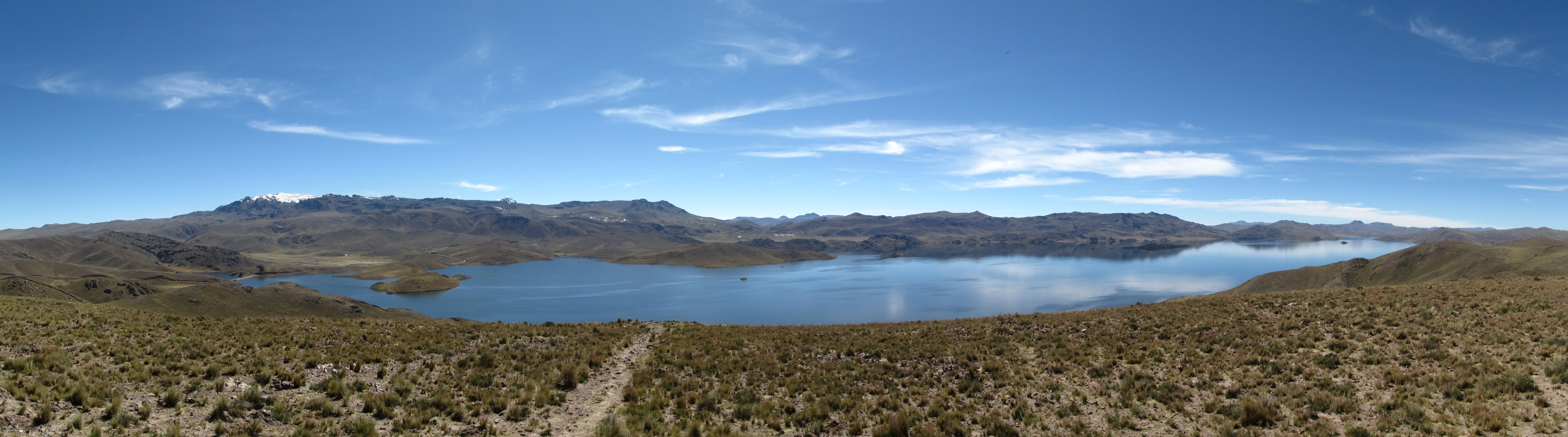
- The lake Lagunillas with the Sillapaka mountain range in the background (on the left).

- Location within Peru
- Location: Puno Region
- Coordinates: 15.725°S 70.735556°W
- Basin countries: Peru
- Surface elevation: c. 4,250 m (13,900 ft)

Lake Lagunillas is a lake in the Andes of far southeastern Peru. Lagunillas is at an altitude of about 4,250 m (13,900 ft) and it is located just northwest of Lake Saracocha. These two lakes are part of the system drained by the Coata River, which flows in a generally easterly direction until entering westernmost Lake Titicaca, about 50 km (30 mi) from Lake Lagunillas as the crow flies.

In 2014, the pupfish Orestias luteus made up slightly more than 70% of catches in fisheries, with the remaining being the introduced rainbow trout, a species also farmed in the lake. Lake Lagunillas is home to the unusual and relatively large "escomeli" form of the Titicaca water frog.

== Climate ==
Climate data for Lake Lagunillas, elevation 4,200 m (13,800 ft)
Month	Jan	Feb	Mar	Apr	May	Jun	Jul	Aug	Sep	Oct	Nov	Dec	Year
Mean daily maximum °C (°F)	13.8 (56.8)	13.8 (56.8)	13.5 (56.3)	14.2 (57.6)	14.0 (57.2)	13.2 (55.8)	13.2 (55.8)	14.1 (57.4)	15.2 (59.4)	16.2 (61.2)	16.4 (61.5)	15.2 (59.4)	14.4 (57.9)
Daily mean °C (°F)	7.6 (45.7)	7.6 (45.7)	7.4 (45.3)	7.1 (44.8)	5.6 (42.1)	4.1 (39.4)	4.0 (39.2)	4.7 (40.5)	6.2 (43.2)	7.3 (45.1)	7.9 (46.2)	7.8 (46.0)	6.4 (43.6)
Mean daily minimum °C (°F)	1.2 (34.2)	1.3 (34.3)	1.3 (34.3)	−0.1 (31.8)	−2.8 (27.0)	−5.0 (23.0)	−5.2 (22.6)	−4.8 (23.4)	−2.9 (26.8)	−1.7 (28.9)	−0.7 (30.7)	0.4 (32.7)	−1.6 (29.1)
Average precipitation mm (inches)	163 (6.4)	139 (5.5)	114 (4.5)	41 (1.6)	9 (0.4)	3 (0.1)	2 (0.1)	7 (0.3)	13 (0.5)	27 (1.1)	51 (2.0)	97 (3.8)	666 (26.3)
Average relative humidity (%)	63	63	62	53	46	45	44	43	42	42	46	52	50
Source: Plataforma digital única del Estado Peruano

== See also ==
- List of lakes in Peru
