= Lake Saracocha =

Lake in Puno, Peru

- Location within Peru
- Location: Peru; Puno Region
- Coordinates: 15°46′51.9″S 70°37′20.4″W
- Basin countries: Peru

Lake Saracocha (possibly from Quechua sara maize, qucha lake, lagoon) is a lake in the Cabanillas District, Puno Region, southeastern Peru. Lake Saracocha is located just southeast of Lake Lagunillas. These two Andean highland lakes are part of the system drained by the Coata River, which flows in a generally easterly direction until entering westernmost Lake Titicaca, about 50 km (30 mi) from Lake Saracocha as the crow flies.

The lake is home to Orestias pupfish. Rainbow trout have been introduced, which probably played a role in the apparent disappearance of the relatively small local "crawfordi" form of the Titicaca water frog.

== See also ==
- List of lakes in Peru
