= Suyt'uqucha (Lampa) =

Lake in the Puno Region, Peru

- Location within Peru
- Location: Puno Region
- Coordinates: 15°23′43″S 70°50′05″W
- Basin countries: Peru
- Max. length: 4.33 km (2.69 mi)
- Max. width: 0.84 km (0.52 mi)
- Surface elevation: 4,881 m (16,014 ft)

Suyt'uqucha (Quechua suyt'u, sayt'u rectangular, qucha lake, lagoon, "rectangular lake", hispanicized spelling Suitococha, Suito) is a lake in Peru located in the Puno Region, Lampa Province, Santa Lucía District. It is situated at a height of about 4,881 metres (16,014 ft), about 4.33 km long and 0.84 km at its widest point. Suyt'uqucha lies south of the larger lake named Ananta.

== See also ==
- List of lakes in Peru
