= Qillqa (Lampa) =

Mountain in Peru

- Location within Peru

Highest point
- Elevation: 5,350 m (17,550 ft)
- Coordinates: 15°18′44″S 70°43′59″W

Geography
- Location: Peru, Puno Region, Lampa Province
- Parent range: Andes

Climbing
- First ascent: 1972 via S. ridge/face.

Qillqa (Quechua for writing (the act and art of writing), Hispanicized spelling Quilca) is a mountain in the Andes of Peru, about 5,350 metres (17,552 ft) high. It is located in the Puno Region, Lampa Province, on the border of the districts Palca and Paratía. Qillqa lies northwest of the mountains Yanawara, Waykira and Hatun Pastu.
