= Sayt'uqucha (Lampa) =

Lake in the Lampa Province, Puno Region, Peru

- Location within Peru
- Location: Puno Region
- Coordinates: 15°25′16″S 70°40′16″W
- Basin countries: Peru
- Max. length: 3.13 km (1.94 mi)
- Max. width: 0.42 km (0.26 mi)
- Surface elevation: 4,556 m (14,948 ft)

Sayt'uqucha or Sayt'u Qucha (Quechua suyt'u, sayt'u rectangular, qucha lake, lagoon, "rectangular lake", hispanicized spellings Saitococha, Saytococha) is a lake in Peru located in the Puno Region, Lampa Province, Paratía District. It is situated at a height of about 4,556 metres (14,948 ft), about 3.13 km long and 0.42 km at its widest point. Sayt'uqucha lies between the mountain Yanawara in the northwest and a group of three lakes called Kimsaqucha (Quechua for "three lakes", hispanicized Quimsaccocha) in the southeast.

== See also ==
- Suyt'uqucha
- List of lakes in Peru
