= Yanawara (Puno) =

Mountain in Peru

- Mina Punta
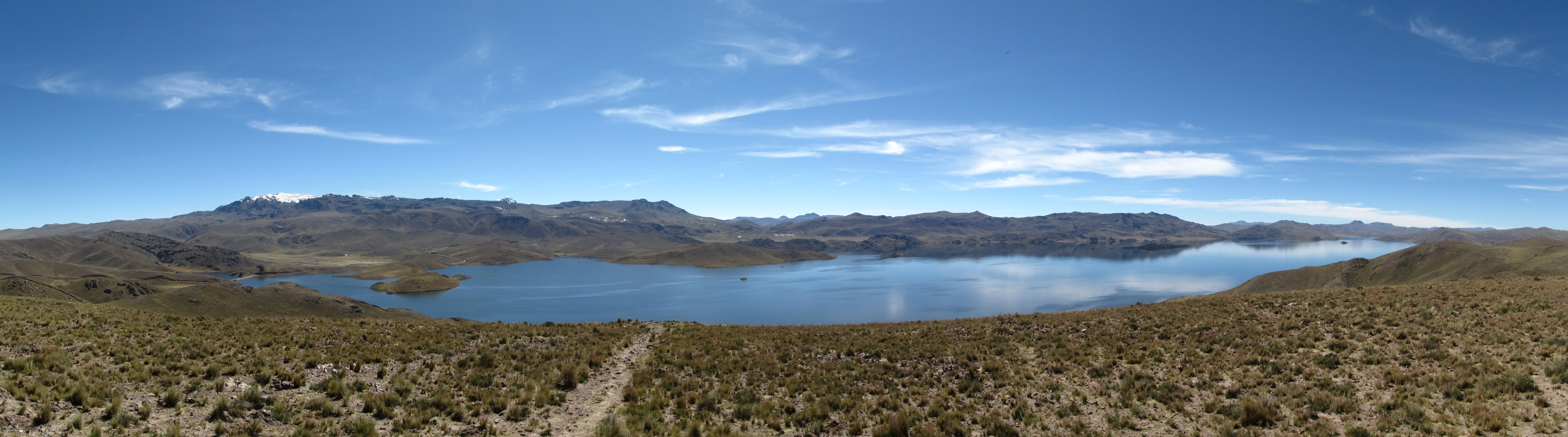
- The lake Lagunillas with the Sillapaka mountain range in the background (on the left). The peak of Yanawara (Mina Punta) is visible behind it (center-left).

Highest point
- Elevation: 5,465 m (17,930 ft)
- Coordinates: 15°22′06″S 70°40′46″W

Geography
- Location within Peru
- Location: Peru, Puno Region, Lampa Province
- Parent range: Andes

Climbing
- First ascent: 1972 via N. ridge

Yanawara (Quechua yana black, wara trousers "black trousers", Hispanicized spelling Yanahuara) or Mina Punta (also Minapunta) is a mountain in the Andes of Peru, about 5,465 metres (17,930 ft) high. It is located in the Puno Region, Lampa Province, on the border of the districts Palca and Paratía. Yanawara lies northwest of the lake Sayt'uqucha.

== See also ==
- Hatun Pastu
- Qillqa
