= Compañía Minera Atacocha =

Atacocha Mining Company, Peru

Compañía Minera Atacocha, S.A.A
- Type: Sociedad Anónima Abierta
- Traded as: BVL: ATACOAC1; BVL: ATACOBC1
- Industry: Mining & Metallurgy
- Founded: 1936
- Headquarters: Lima, Peru
- Key people: Ico Ucovich Dorsner (Chairman); Abraham Chahuán Abedrrabo (CEO)
- Products: Lead, zinc, copper
- Revenue: ▲US$244.303 million (2007)
- Operating income: ▼US$85.409 million (2007)
- Net income: ▼US$49.583 million (2007)
- Total assets: ▲US$572.236 million (2007)
- Number of employees: ▼2,057 (2007)
- Parent: Votorantim Group
- Website: www.atacocha.com.pe

Compañía Minera Atacocha, S.A.A, better known as Atacocha (Spanish pronunciation: [ataˈkotʃa]), is a Peruvian mining company engaged in the exploration and exploitation of mine concessions. Since 2009, it operates under Nexa Resources Atacocha, S.A.A., and is listed in the country's exchange.

It operates a treatment plant and a mining camp, which are located in the districts of San Francisco de Asis de Yurusyacan and Yanacancha, province of Pasco. The company's activities include the production and sale of lead, zinc and copper concentrates. In addition, the company is active in the electric power generation, and it owns two hydroelectric power plants: Marcopampa and Chaprin with an installed capacity of 6.6 megawatts.

Atacocha was bought in 2008 by the Brazilian conglomerate Votorantim Group, which owns 70% of its interests. Until then, the enterprise was publicly listed in the Lima Stock Exchange and was part of the S&P/BVL Peru General Index, the country's main index.

As of 2000, Atacocha had extracted 29 million tonnes of ore in more than 275 km of horizontal and vertical sites. With this, the company had produced 2.3 million megatons of zinc concentrates, 1.7 million of lead, and more than 100 million fine ounces of silver.

== History ==
The company was founded in 1936 and is headquartered in Lima. It was established by Francisco José (Paco) Gallo y Díez, a Spanish hidalgo whose family had held jurisdictional lordship over the Valley of Sedano in Burgos, northern Spain. Descendant of a once-powerful family, they had held prominent religious and colonial posts, such as Juan López Gallo (1500-1571), Baron of Male and governor of Spanish Netherlands. Gallo was born 1 February 1905 in Santander. As the youngest of 8 and educated in Bilbao and London, he was sent to Peru in 1923 by his father to liquidate a family company and return home following the failed attempts of the rest of his siblings. The company, "Casa Gallo" was an important yet declining commercial conglomerate that owned land and mines in the country. At his arrival, the astute 18-year-old saw business opportunity and successfully sold Casa Gallo in an effort to buy land in Cerro de Pasco, situated at more than 14,000 ft of altitude. On his return to Europe, he became a mining engineer and bought rights of mine exploitation, founding Compañía Minera Atacocha 6 February 1936 in Lima. The original company logo included a rooster as a direct reference to the founder's family name and coat of arms (Gallo is Spanish for rooster). Luis Gallo, a distant cousin of Paco who was prime minister of Peru, was a board member at Atacocha.

On 20 March 1936, the first Session of the Ordinary General Shareholders' Meeting was held. During the meeting, the Board of Directors that would be presided over by Mr. Gino Bianchini was appointed, and would be made up of Gerardo Diez, Alberto Quesada, Manuel B. Llosa and Oscar Díaz Dulanto, with the interim Management falling to the latter. On 20 April, Italian engineer Edgardo Portaro Mazzetti was appointed Manager of the company. Gallo occupied the chairmanship of the company until 1973 when he renounced and moved to Madrid following the radical reforms of the military government of Juan Velasco Alvarado. This was despite the original petition of his father to sell the declining family enterprise and return home.

== See also ==
- Mineral industry of Peru
- Rio Tinto
- Glencore

== Bibliography ==
- Atacocha, Compañía Minera (2008). Memoria Anual 2007 - Annual Report 2007. Compañía Minera Atacocha, S.A.A.
- Martínez Riaza, Ascensión (2006). A Pesar del Gobierno; Españoles en el Perú 1879-1939. Editorial CSIC. ISBN 97-884-0008449-3.
- Milla Batres, Carlos (1994). Enciclopedia biográfica e histórica del Perú; Siglos XIX-XX. Editorial Milla Batres. ISBN 97-895-8941304-3.
