= Lake Alcacocha (Pasco) =

Lake in Peru

- Location within Peru
- Location: Peru, Pasco Region, Pasco Province,
- Coordinates: 10°35′30″S 76°19′25″W
- Basin countries: Peru

Lake Alcacocha (possibly from Quechua allqa black-and-white qucha lake) is a lake in Peru situated in the Pasco Region, Daniel Alcides Carrion Province, Tusi District, and in the Pasco Province, Simón Bolívar District. It is located 12 km from Cerro de Pasco.

== See also ==
- Kuntuyuq
- List of lakes in Peru
