= Wat'aqucha (Pasco) =

Lake in Peru

- Location within Peru
- Location: Pasco Region
- Coordinates: 10°47′1″S 76°35′39″W
- Basin countries: Peru

Wat'aqucha (Quechua wat'a island, qucha lake, "island lake", hispanicized spelling Huatacocha) is a lake in Peru located in the Pasco Region, Pasco Province, Huayllay District. It is situated west of the larger lake named Aququcha.
