= Paucartambo District =

Paucartambo District may refer to:

- Paucartambo District, Pasco
- Paucartambo District, Paucartambo
