= Lake Pomacocha =

Lake Pomacocha may refer to:

- Lake Pomacocha (Ayacucho), a lake in the region of Ayacucho, Peru
- Lake Pomacocha (Pasco), a lake in the region of Pasco, Peru
- Another name for Lake Pomacochas, a lake in the region of Amazonas, Peru
