= Qaqapatan =

Archaeological site in Peru

Coordinates: 10.5188°S 76.2442°W

- Interactive map of Qaqapatan
- Location: Peru, Pasco Region, Pasco Province
- Region: Andes

Site notes
- Height: 3,782 metres (12,408 ft)

Qaqapatan (Quechua) is an archaeological site with rock paintings in Peru. It lies in the Pasco Region, Pasco Province, Yarusyacán District, at a height of 3,787 metres (12,425 ft). Qaqapatan is situated at a height of 3,782 metres (12,408 ft) at the foot of the mountain Qayakuna in the village Quchaq (Cochac), north of the town Cerro de Pasco.

== See also ==
- Kunturmarka
- Markapukyu
- Q'illaywasin
