= Yanaqucha (Tinyahuarco) =

Lake in Peru

- Location within Peru
- Location: Peru; Pasco Region
- Coordinates: 10°45′50″S 76°13′10″W

Yanaqucha (Quechua yana black, very dark, qucha lake, lagoon, "black lake", Hispanicized spelling Yanacocha) is a lake in Peru located in Tinyahuarco District, Pasco Province, Pasco Region. It lies southeast of the mining town Cerro de Pasco and east of Tinyahuarco.
