= Pacifico Seguros =

Pacífico Seguros
- Traded as: BVL: PSUIZAC1
- Industry: Insurance
- Founded: 1992
- Headquarters: Lima, Peru
- Key people: Dionisio Romero Paoletti (President), Alvaro Correa Malachowski (CEO)
- Parent: Credicorp
- Website: www.pacifico.com.pe

El Pacífico- Compañía de Seguros y Reaseguros S.A. or Pacifico Seguros (BVL: PSUIZAC1) is a leading insurance and reinsurance company in Peru and one of the largest in Latin America. Pacifico Seguros is a subsidiary of Credicorp, the largest financial holding group in Peru.
Its corporate headquarters is located at 830 Juan de Arona Avenue in San Isidro District, Lima.

== History ==
The company was established in 1992 through the merger of El Pacifico Compañia de Seguros y Reaseguros (founded 1943) and Peruano Suiza Compañía de Seguros y Reaseguros (founded 1948).

== Insurance products ==
Pacifico Seguros offers various private and corporate insurance products. The policies cover health, automobile, life, home, travel, pensions and annuities, personal accident insurance, and many other types of risk. In addition, it offers corporate insurance products covering company’s assets, which include heritage, engineering, transport, aviation and maritime insurance.
