= Yanaqucha (Huayllay) =

- Location within Peru
- Location: Peru; Pasco Region
- Coordinates: 11°06′53.9″S 76°17′59.3″W
- Surface elevation: 4,471 m (14,669 ft)

Yanaqucha - Pallqan Dam
- Location within Peru

Dam and spillways
- Height: 4.6 m (15 ft)

Power Station
- Operator: Electroperu

Yanaqucha (Quechua yana black, very dark, qucha lake, "black lake", hispanicized spelling Yanacocha) is a lake in Peru located in Huayllay District, Pasco Province, Pasco Region. It is situated at a height of about 4,471 metres (14,669 ft). Yanaqucha lies between Waskaqucha in the west and Lake Junin in the east. The lake belongs to the watershed of the Mantaro River.

In 2000 the 4.6 m (15 ft) high Yanaqucha-Pallqan dam was erected at the southeastern end of the lake at 11°07′20″S 76°17′19″W, northwest of the village of Pallqan (Palcan). The dam is operated by Electroperu.
