= Middle Village =

Middle Village is the name of several areas:

== In the United States ==
- Middle Village, Queens, in New York City
  - Middle Village – Metropolitan Avenue (BMT Myrtle Avenue Line), a subway station in Middle Village
- Station Camp, or Middle Village, a historical site on the Columbia River that is part of Lewis and Clark National Historical Park
- Middle Village, Michigan, a historic village located in modern-day Readmond Township, Michigan
- Middle Village, Wisconsin

== In other countries ==
Places that mean "Middle Village" in other languages include:

- Medelby (Germany, Sweden and Finland)
- Ortaköy, Nicosia (Cyprus)
- Ortaköy (Turkey)
- Chaupimarca (Peru)
