= Pallanchacra District =

Coordinates: 10.4434°S 76.1873°W

Pallanchacra Pallanchakra
- District
- Interactive map of Pallanchacra
- Country: Peru
- Region: Pasco
- Province: Pasco
- Founded: November 14, 1959
- Capital: Pallanchacra

Government
  - Mayor: Floriano Yoni Bernabe Berrospi

Area
  - Total: 73.69 km^{2} (28.45 sq mi)
- Elevation: 3,115 m (10,220 ft)

Population (2005 census)
  - Total: 2,902
  - Density: 39.38/km^{2} (102.0/sq mi)
- Time zone: UTC-5 (PET)
- UBIGEO: 190106

Pallanchacra District is one of thirteen districts of the province Pasco in Peru.

== See also ==
- Q'illaywasin
