= Pirwa Hirka =

Mountain in Peru

- Location within Peru

Highest point
- Elevation: 4,800 m (15,700 ft)
- Coordinates: 11°02′48″S 76°31′39″W

Geography
- Location: Peru, Lima Region, Pasco Region
- Parent range: Andes

Pirwa Hirka (Quechua pirwa deposit, hirka mountain, "deposit mountain", hispanicized spelling Pirhua Jirca) is a mountain in the Andes of Peru, about 4,800 m (15,700 ft) high. It is located in the Lima Region, Huaral Province, Pacaraos District, and in the Pasco Region, Pasco Province, Huayllay District. It lies west of a lake named Warunqucha.
