= Lake Acucocha =

- Location within Peru
- Location: Pasco Region, Pasco Province
- Coordinates: 10°46′27″S 76°32′50″W
- Basin countries: Peru

Acucocha Dam
- Location within Peru
- Country: Peru

Power Station
- Operator: Cia Minera Volcan

Lake Acucocha (possibly from Quechua aqu sand, qucha lake, "sand lake") is a lake in the Pasco Region in Peru. It is located in the Pasco Province, in the districts of Simón Bolívar and Tinyahuarco, approximately 27 kilometres from Tinyahuarco. It belongs to the watershed of the Mantaro River.

The Acucocha dam was built at the southeastern end of the lake at 10°47′15″S 76°31′26″W. It is operated by Cia Minera Volcan.

== See also ==
- List of lakes in Peru
