= Hatun Waqya =

Mountain in Peru

- Location within Peru

Highest point
- Elevation: 4,800 m (15,700 ft)
- Coordinates: 11°05′01″S 76°27′37″W

Geography
- Location: Peru, Junín Region, Pasco Region
- Parent range: Andes

Hatun Waqya (Quechua hatun big, waqya call, appeal, "big call (or appeal)", Hispanicized spelling Jatun Huaguia) is a mountain in the Andes of Peru which reaches an altitude of approximately 4,800 metres (15,748 ft). It is located in the Junín Region, Yauli Province, Carhuacayan District, and in the Pasco Region, Pasco Province, Huayllay District. Hatun Waqya lies northwest of the lake named Waskhaqucha.
