= Aququcha =

Aququcha (Quechua aqu sand, qucha lake, "sand lake", Hispanicized spellings Accoccocha, Accococha, Accucocha, Acococha, Acucocha, Ajococha, Ajojocha, Ajucocha) may refer to:

- Lake Acococha, a lake in the Junín Region, Peru
- Aququcha (Lima), a mountain in the Lima Region, Peru
- Lake Acucocha, a lake in the Pasco Region, Peru
