= Huaroncocha =

Lake in Peru

- Location within Peru
- Coordinates: 11°02′57″S 76°27′06″W
- Basin countries: Peru; Pasco Region
- Max. length: 9 km (5.6 mi)
- Max. width: 2.61 km (1.62 mi)
- Surface elevation: 4,587 m (15,049 ft)

Huaroncocha (possibly from Quechua waru basket or platform of a rope bridge to cross rivers / stony ground or place, precious stones, heaping, stone heap, -n a suffix, qucha lake,) is a lake in Peru located in the Pasco Region, Pasco Province, Huayllay District. It is situated at a height of about 4,587 metres (15,049 ft), about 9 km long and 2.61 km at its widest point. Huaroncocha lies north of Huascacocha.

The western part of the lake is also called Huaroncocha Chico (Spanish for "small") and the eastern part is named Yanamachay (possibly from Quechua for "black cave").

== See also ==
- Huayllay National Sanctuary
- List of lakes in Peru
