= José Fernando de Abascal y Sousa =

Spanish general and colonial administrator (1743–1821)

The Most Excellent The Marquess of Concordia KOS
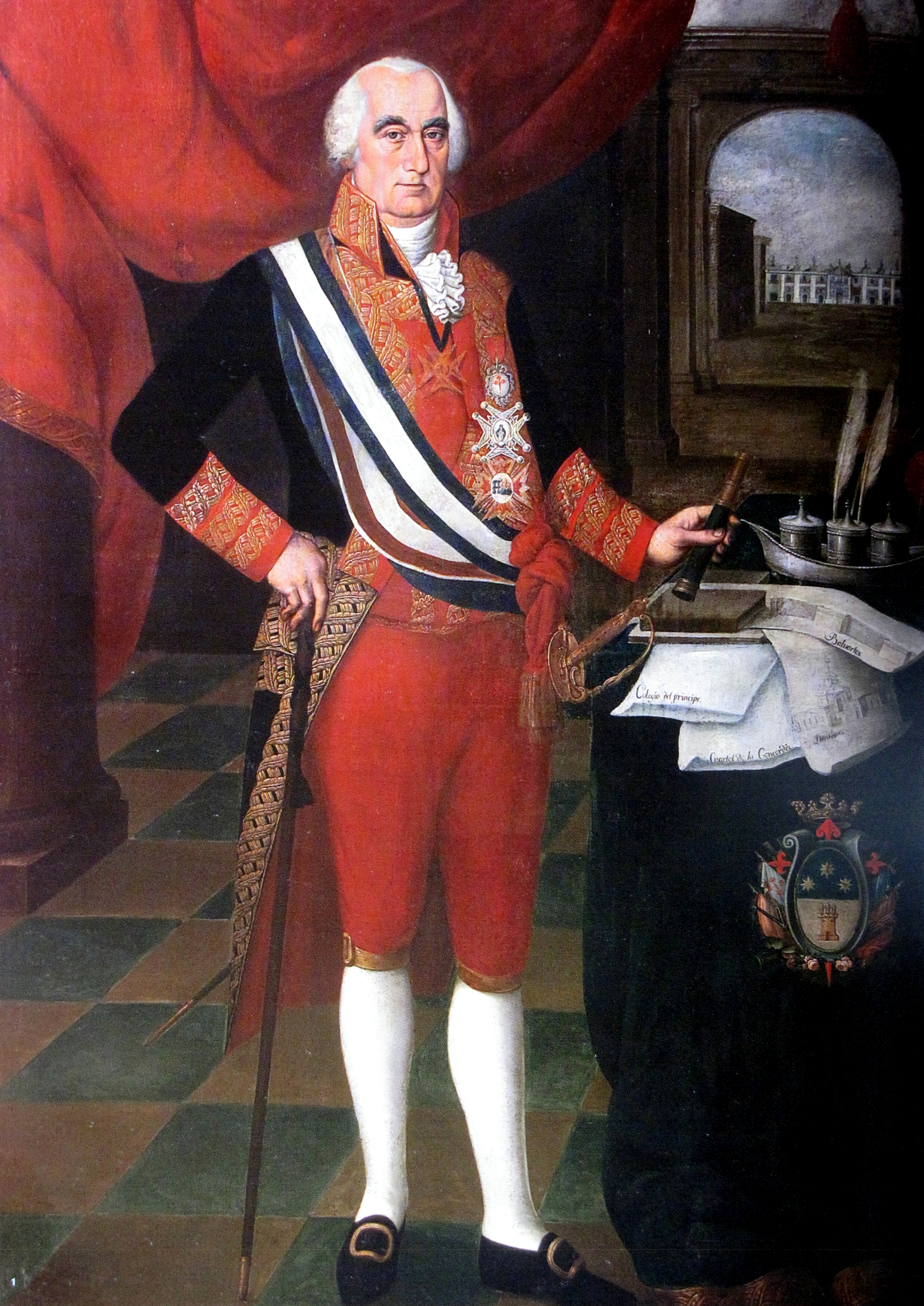

38th Viceroy of Peru
- In office August 20, 1806 – July 7, 1816
- Monarchs: Charles IV; Ferdinand VII
- Prime Minister: Manuel de Godoy
- Preceded by: Gabriel de Avilés
- Succeeded by: Joaquín de la Pezuela

Personal details
- Born: June 3, 1743 Oviedo, Spain
- Died: 30 June 1821 (aged 78) Madrid, Spain

José Fernando de Abascal y Sousa, 1st Marquess of Concordia, KOS (Spanish: José Fernando de Abascal y Sousa, primer Marqués de la Concordia), (sometimes spelled Souza) (June 3, 1743 in Oviedo, Asturias, Spain – June 30, 1821 in Madrid) was a Spanish military officer and colonial administrator in America. From August 20, 1806, to July 7, 1816, he was viceroy of Peru, during the Spanish American wars of independence.

== Background ==
Abascal was born into a noble family. At the age of 19 he entered the army. After serving for 20 years he was promoted to colonel, and later in the war against France, to brigadier. In 1796 he took part in the defense of Havana against the British. Three years later he was named commanding general and intendant of Nueva Galicia (western Mexico). He took up that office in 1800. In 1804 he was named viceroy of Río de la Plata in Buenos Aires. He never took possession of the office, because in the same year (1804) he was named viceroy of Peru.

== As viceroy of Peru ==
He was unable to occupy the position of viceroy in Lima until 1806, because he was taken prisoner by the British during his voyage from Spain. Once in office, Abascal promoted educational reforms, reorganized the army, and stamped out local rebellions. The last cargo of black slaves in Peru was landed during his administration, in 1806. At that time an adult male slave sold for 600 pesos.

The Balmis Expedition arrived in Lima on May 23, 1806. This expedition, named for its head, Doctor Francisco Javier de Balmis, was propagating smallpox vaccine throughout the Spanish Empire. Balmis himself was not with the group that arrived in Peru. The Peruvian group was headed by Doctor José Salvany, Balmis's deputy. The vaccine had proceeded them, however, having arrived in Lima from Buenos Aires. On August 2, 1805, 22 Brazilian slaves had been vaccinated there and sent as living carriers of the vaccine to northern Argentina, Paraguay, Chile and Peru. (The Balmis expedition used Spanish orphans for the same purpose.) Abascal ordered mass vaccinations in Lima, but without much success. The vaccine was available, but it was not free, and vested interests were able to preserve it as a source of revenue.

On December 1, 1806, an earthquake lasting 2 minutes shook the towers of the city of Lima. Earthquake-generated waves at El Callao threw a heavy anchor onto the roof of the harbormaster. One hundred fifty thousand pesos were required to repair the walls of the city. In October 1807 a comet was seen in Lima, and in November 1811 another one appeared that was visible with the naked eye for six months.

In 1810 the medical school of San Fernando was founded. In 1812 and 1813 occurred the great fire of Guayaquil that destroyed half the city, a hurricane in Lima that uprooted trees in the Alameda, and earthquakes in Ica and Piura.

== The wars of independence ==
When revolution broke out in Buenos Aires on May 25, 1810, Abascal reoccupied the provinces of Córdoba, Potosí, La Paz and Charcas (in Upper Peru, now Bolivia) and reincorporated them into the Viceroyalty of Peru. (These provinces had been separated from Peru when the Viceroyalty of Río de la Plata was created in 1776.) A royalist army defeated rebels in the Battle of Huaqui, Upper Peru.

He also reincorporated Chile and Quito (Ecuador) into the Viceroyalty of Peru. (Quito had been in the Viceroyalty of New Granada since the separation of that colony from Peru in 1739.)

Abascal was a dedicated and tireless supporter of absolute monarchy; nevertheless he supported the Cortes of Cádiz in the fight with Napoleon, sending money and materiel. During his administration, the Inquisition of Lima was temporarily abolished as a result of the reforms taken by the Cortes. Because of the distance between Peru and Spain and due to the wars in Spain and in the Americas, he governed nearly independently of mother country. He fought hard to suppress the independence movements in Spanish America, converting Peru into a center of royalist reaction. After the proclamation of the liberal Spanish Constitution of 1812 in Spain, Abascal fought to keep its provisions from being applied in Peru. This led to revolts in Cusco, Tacna and Arequipa, all of which were repressed.

In 1812 Abascal gave his support to a plan for a company organised by Francisco Uville to import steam engines made by the Cornish engineer Richard Trevithick so the silver mines at Cerro de Pasco could be pumped out and worked at much greater depths.

On April 24, 1814, a Spanish force under Rafael Maroto disembarked at Callao to fight the rebels in the colony. The viceroy sent 2,400 troops under Brigadier Antonio Pareja to fight in Chile. When they arrived on the island of Chiloé, they were joined by a large number of other men, and they also gained reinforcements in the cities of Valdivia and Talcahuano. This southern part of the country was not sympathetic to the independence movement. Parejas then entered Concepción. He granted amnesty to the Spanish garrison there, and they joined his forces. Now leading about 4,000 troops he went to Chillán, which surrendered without a fight. There 2,000 more men joined the royalist forces.

In 1812 Abascal was created marqués de la Concordia. In 1816 he was recalled at his request, and returned to Spain. He was replaced by General Joaquín de la Pezuela. Abascal died at the age of 79 in 1821.

== See also ==
- Peruvian War of Independence
- Bolivian War of Independence
- Chilean War of Independence
- Royalist (Spanish American independence)

== Notes ==
Government offices
Preceded by Gabriel de Avilés	Viceroy of Peru; 1806–1816	Succeeded by Joaquín de la Pezuela
