= Peperomia naviculifolia =

Scientific classification
- Kingdom: Plantae
- Clade: Tracheophytes
- Clade: Angiosperms
- Clade: Magnoliids
- Order: Piperales
- Family: Piperaceae
- Genus: Peperomia
- Species: P. naviculifolia

Binomial name
- Peperomia naviculifolia Trel.

Species of plant

Peperomia naviculifolia or Peperomia naviculaefolia is a species of terrestrial or epiphytic herb in the genus Peperomia that is native to Peru. It grows on wet tropical biomes. Its conservation status is Threatened.

== Description ==
The type specimen were collected at Huariaca, Peru at an altitude of 2850 meters above sea level.

Peperomia naviculifolia is a small, alpine, scarcely branched, glabrous herb with a stem about 5 mm thick, densely leafy toward the base and terminating in a remotely bracteate scape. The alternate leaves are very thick, deeply V-sulcate or boat-shaped, obliquely lanceolate-elliptic, measuring 15 mm long and 7 mm wide. They are acute at both ends, nerveless or obscurely 3-nerved, and granular in texture. The slender petiole is 5 mm long. Several spikes are arranged in a panicle at the apex of the scape, each 40 mm long and 2 mm thick, with loosely arranged flowers, and borne on a 5 mm peduncle. The ovary is ovoid with an apical stigma.

== Taxonomy and naming ==
It was described in 1936 by William Trelease in Publications of the Field Museum of Natural History, Botanical Series 13, from specimens collected by James Francis Macbride.

The epithet combines the Latin navicula and folia, referring to the distinctive deeply grooved, boat-shaped leaves.

== Distribution and habitat ==
It is native to Peru. It grows as a terrestrial or epiphytic herb. It grows on wet tropical biomes.

== Conservation ==
This species is assessed as Threatened, in a preliminary report.
