= Pichqa Pukyu =

Mountain in Peru

- Location within Peru

Highest point
- Elevation: 4,400 m (14,400 ft)
- Coordinates: 10°26′59″S 76°05′22″W

Geography
- Location: Peru, Pasco Region
- Parent range: Andes

Pichqa Pukyu (Quechua pichqa five, pukyu spring, well, "five springs (or wells)", hispanicized spelling Pichgapuquio) is a mountain in the Andes of Peru, about 4,400 m (14,436 ft) high. It is located in the Pasco Region, Pasco Province, Huariaca District.
