= Huayllay District =

Coordinates: 10.9999°S 76.3653°W

Huayllay Wayllay
- District
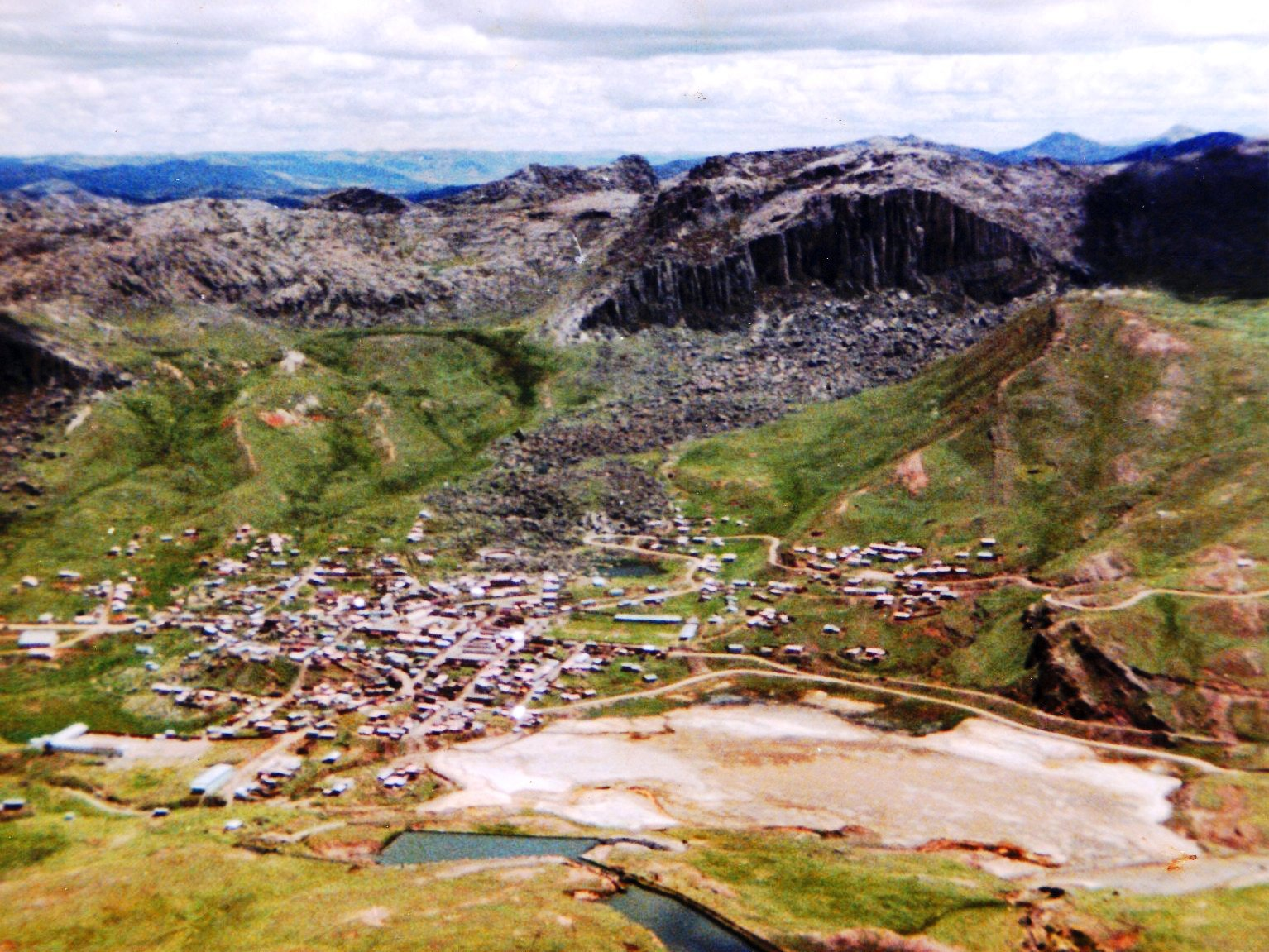

- Coat of arms
- Interactive map of Huayllay
- Country: Peru
- Region: Pasco
- Province: Pasco
- Capital: Huayllay

Government
  - Mayor: Roman Luis Marcelo Callupe

Area
  - Total: 1,026.87 km^{2} (396.48 sq mi)
- Elevation: 4,310 m (14,140 ft)

Population (2005 census)
  - Total: 9,592
  - Density: 9.341/km^{2} (24.19/sq mi)
- Time zone: UTC-5 (PET)
- UBIGEO: 190104
- Website: munihuayllay.gob.pe

Huayllay District (Quechua Wayllay recreation meadow, lush grove, ichu variety) is one of thirteen districts of the province Pasco in Peru.

== Geography ==
Some of the highest mountains of the district are listed below:

- Anta Kancha
- Chunta Kancha
- Hatun Waqya
- Inti Kancha
- Kuchpanqa
- Kuyuq
- Maray Takana
- Pirwa Hirka
- Qarwaq Pata
- Qawi
- Qucha Uman
- Tunshu Kancha
- T'uruqucha
- Wachwa P'itinqa
- Wallina
- Waqra Willka
- Yana Challwa
- Yana Mach'ay

== See also ==
- Huayllay National Sanctuary
- Kuchpanqa
- Warunqucha
- Wat'aqucha
- Yanaqucha
