= Francisco Uville =

- Born: François Uville c. 1781; Switzerland
- Died: August 1818; Peru
- Occupation: Entrepreneur
- Known for: Mechanisation of Peruvian mining

Location of Cerro de Pasco in Peru

Francisco Uville (born François Uvillé, c. 1781 – August 1818) was a Swiss entrepreneur who helped introduce steam engines into the mining industry of Peru. Through his efforts engines designed and built by the Cornish engineer Richard Trevithick were shipped to Peru and carried high over the Andes to the silver mines, where they were used to pump water and hoist ore. Uville went well beyond the mandate agreed with his partners in his arrangements to obtain the equipment. He died before seeing the enterprise collapse in 1820 during the Peruvian War of Independence.

== Early life ==
Francisco Uville was born in Switzerland. He was about 36 years old in 1817, so would have been born around 1781. Uville was a watchmaker by trade.

As a young man Uville visited the rich silver mines of the Pasco Region about 150 miles (240 km) from Lima, Peru. The Yanacancha socavón, an adit or tunnel 5,000 feet (1,500 m) long, had been completed in 1811 to drain the mines into the San Judas lake. However, on average it was only about 200 feet (61 m), below ground level. Any mine deeper than the socavón would have to be drained by hand pumps and buckets. When Uville visited them, the silver mines had reached the socavón level and were now almost abandoned. It struck Uville that the mines could be worked much deeper by using steam engines to pump out the water.

Uville visited England in 1811 and spent a few months in London. He met the Boulton and Watt engineers, who told him it would not be possible to build low-pressure steam engines that would work efficiently in the thin air of the mountains round Cerro de Pasco, around 14,000 feet (4,300 m) above sea level. It would also be impossible to make an engine that could be disassembled into pieces small enough to be carried by mule along the narrow track to the mines, which reached 17,000 feet (5,200 m) above sea level. (Note: According to a visitor to the mines in 1850, "The Cerro de Pasco mines are about 170 miles from Lima; we crossed a ridge 25,000 [sic] feet high. The mines were about 13,400 feet high above the sea. There was but one road; no wheel vehicle could be used; everything was carried on mules. Sometimes the road was only 2 1/2 feet wide, cut in precipices three or four hundred feet perpendicular: some of the men were afraid to walk, and dared not ride.") However, while in London Uville chanced on a working model of Richard Trevithick's high-pressure steam engine, which he saw in the window of the engine maker William Rowley. He was struck by the simplicity of its design and how well it was built, and bought the model for 20 guineas. He took it back to Peru and successfully tested it at Cerro de Pasco. Water boiled at this altitude at about 80 °C (176 °F) compared to 100 °C (212 °F) at sea level, but still produced ample steam and drove the engine as well as it had in London.

== Cerro de Pasco enterprise ==
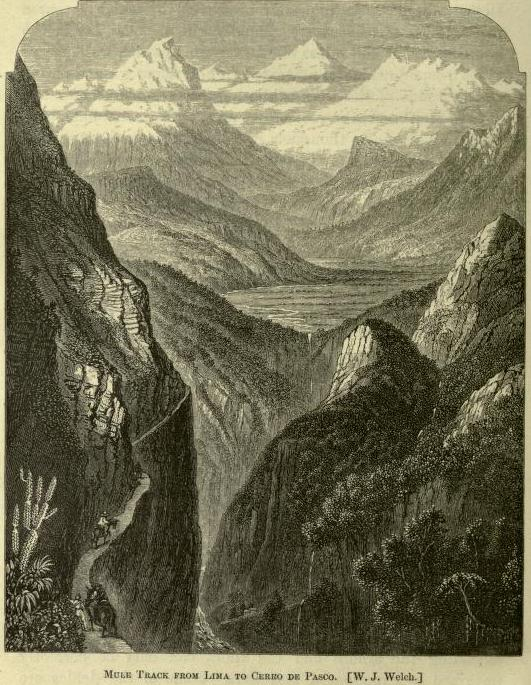
Mule track from Lima to Cerro de Pasco (1874)

=== Formation ===
On 17 July 1812 Uville joined the leading Lima merchants Pedro Abadia and Jose Aresmendi to form a company to drain the mines around Cerro de Pasco. Abadia received two shares for $20,000, while Arismindi and Uville received one share each for $10,000. It was estimated that $30,000 would cover the cost of two engines in England, and Uville was authorised to buy another if he could obtain it on credit. Uville was to arrange to have the machines made in England and erecting in Peru, and in return would get 10% of the net profits. The remainder would be divided in four parts among the shareholders. If the enterprise succeeded Uville would be credited with $2,000 for the model and with travelling expenses.

José Fernando de Abascal y Sousa, Viceroy of Lima, gave his support to the plan. On 22 August 1812 the company made a contract with the owners of the Cerro de Pasco mines. The contract, signed by all but three of the mine owners, was for at least two full-size engines to be installed at Santa Rosa. The company would provide the capital to buy and transport the steam engines and to install them over a pit dug down to 111 feet (34 m) below the Yanacancha socavón. Water filtering in from the surrounding pits would be pumped up to the socavón, allowing silver to be extracted from the lower levels. The company would get 15% of the ore from the Yanacancha and Yauricocha mines, 20% of ore from the other mines, and 50% of the ore from the drainage pit.

=== Second journey to England ===
Uville travelled to Jamaica, then continued to Falmouth, Cornwall, which he reached in the summer of 1813. He became ill on the journey. He found that Trevithick's first cousin was a fellow passenger, and a meeting between Trevithick and Uville was arranged as soon as they reached England. Uville spent several months at Trevithick's house in Camborne while he learned about the use of machinery in mining and visited most of the Cornish mines. Trevithick, who had made improvements to his high-pressure engines, entered a contract with Uville to deliver nine steam engines.

On 8 January 1814 Uville made Trevithick a one-fifth partner in the company and guaranteed Trevithick a good percentage of the profits. The partnership was given in exchange for £3,000 that was needed to pay overdue bills, and was to be ratified later by the partners in Lima. Ulville said he had bills on various people in England, but could not draw on them since the payers were absent from the country. Uville had acted far beyond his authority. His agreement with Abadia and Aresmendi prohibited bringing in new partners. He was only authorised to buy two engines, plus a third on credit. He had spent more twice the authorised amount.

=== Delivery of engines ===
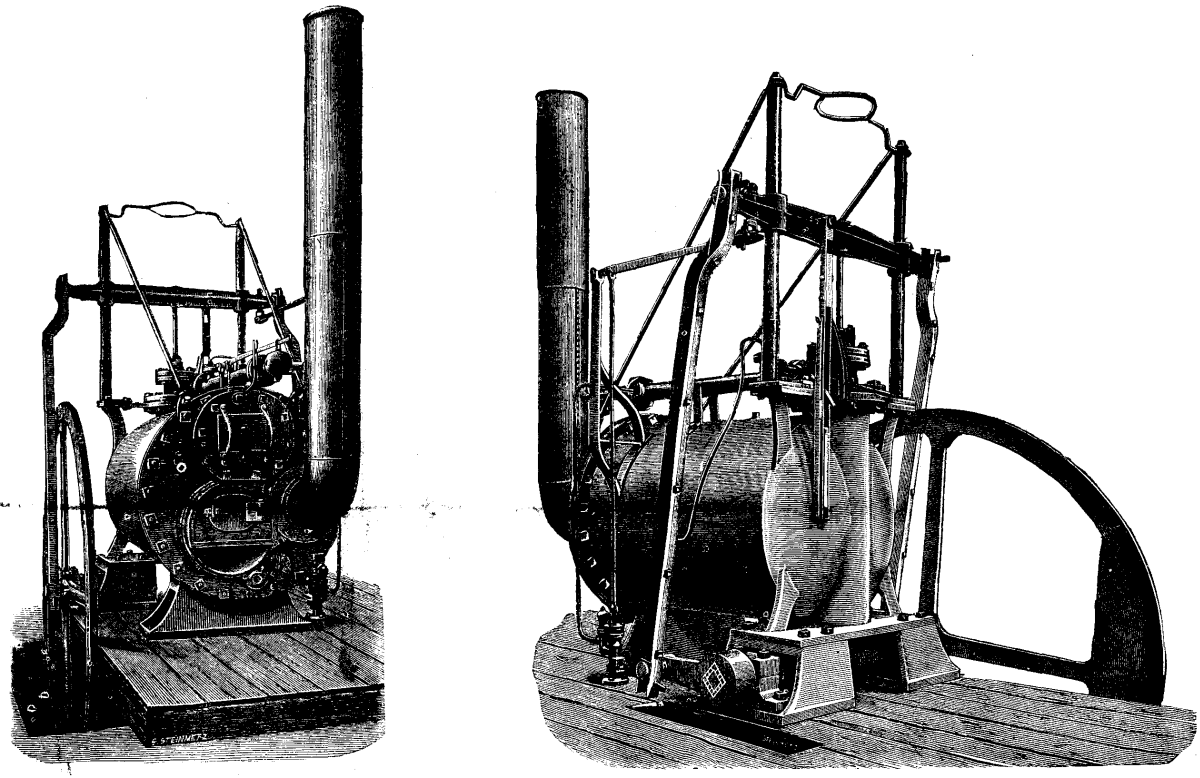
Trevithick High Pressure Steam Engine

The engines were built for about £10,000 and shipped for Lima on a south sea whaler that left on 1 September 1814. There were four 33 hp pumping engines, four 10 hp winding engines, and a smaller engine to be used by the mint in Lima. There also four spare boilers, pitwork for the engines and other equipment. Uville sailed with the engines accompanied by the Cornish engineers Thomas Trevarthen of Crowan, Henry Vivian, of Camborne and William Bull of Chacewater. Transporting the equipment from the coast to Cerro de Pasco took much longer than expected, in part because the Indian communities along the way would not provide the necessary manpower. However, William Bull put the first steam engine into operation at the Santa Rosa mine near Cerro de Pasco on 27 July 1816. The test was satisfactory. A pit 17 feet (5.2 m) deep was emptied in 21 minutes, and then began filling with water from the surrounding mines. The official report to the Viceroy, published in the Lima Gazette in August 1816 said,

Immense and incessant labours and boundless expense have conquered difficulties hitherto deemed insuperable; and we have, with unlimited admiration, witnessed the erection and astonishing operations of the first Steam Engine. It is established in the royal mineral territory of Taüricocha in the province of Tarma; and we have had the felicity of seeing the drain of the first shaft in the Santa Rosa mine, in the noble district of Pasco. We are ambitious of transmitting to posterity the details of an undertaking of such prodigious magnitude, from which we anticipate a torrent of silver that shall fill surrounding nations with astonishment.

A winding engine was installed beside the pump engine at Santa Rosa, and saved much labour in hauling up the ore from the drainage pit as the water was lowered. A vein of coal had been found to supply fuel. Six months after the Santa Rosa pump had been started a second pump was working at the Yanacancha mine, and rapidly drained the mine.

=== Difficulties and death ===
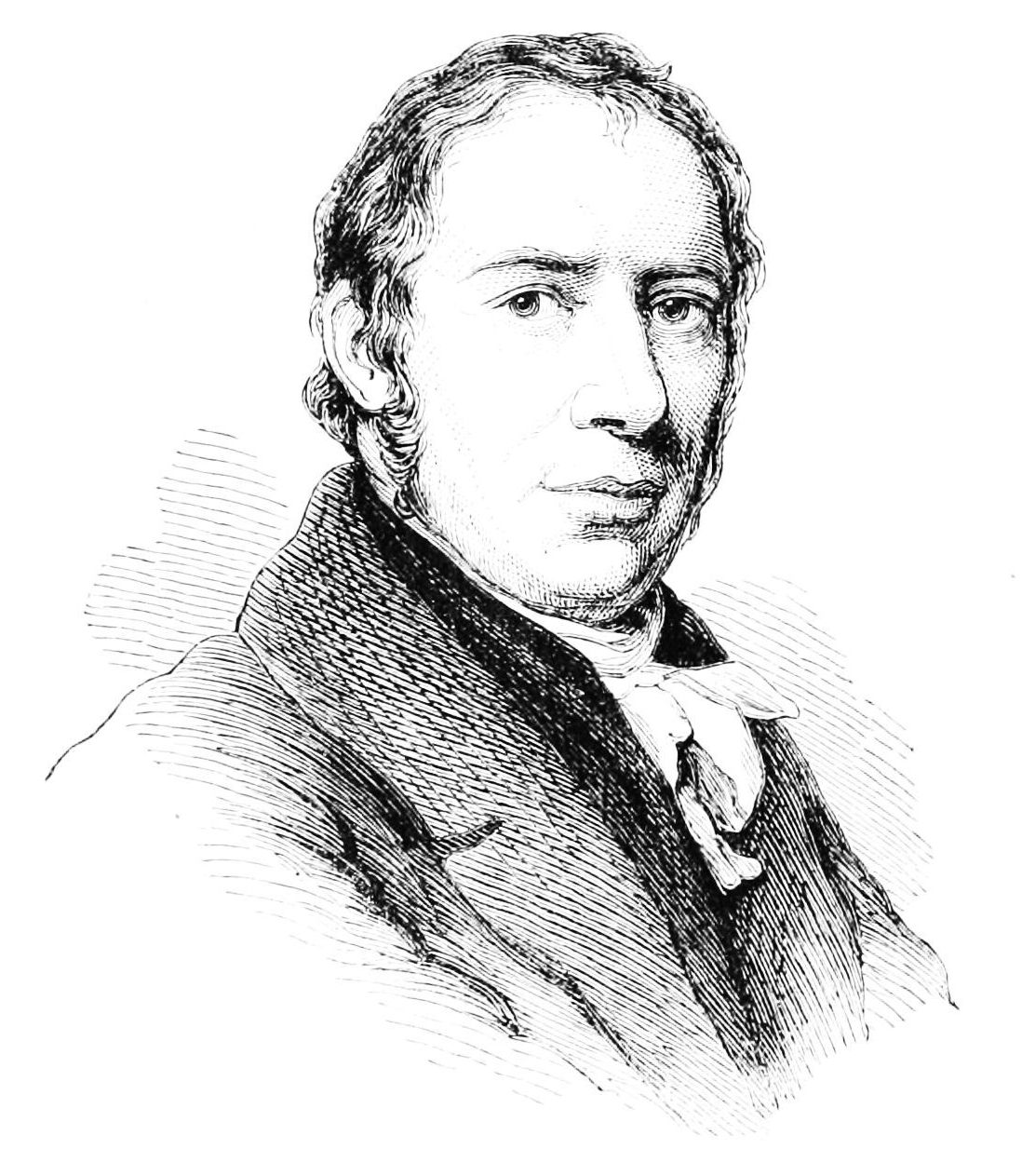
Richard Trevithick

Richard Trevithick sailed for Lima on 20 October 1816 on a south sea whaler, with a Mr. Page of London and James Saunders of Camborne, an engine maker. He bought with him a furnace to be used in purifying the silver by sulphur. He reached Lima on 6 February 1817. The Lima Gazette of 12 February 1817 reported Don Ricardo Trevithick's arrival, saying, "This professor can, with the assistance of the workmen who accompany him, construct as many engines as are necessary in Peru, without any need of sending to England for any part of these vast machines. The excellent character of Don. R. Trevithick, and his ardent desire for promoting the interests of Peru, recommend him in the highest degree to public estimation, and make us hope that his arrival in this kingdom will form the epoch of its prosperity, with the enjoyment of the riches enclosed in it ..."

The machinery in Cerro de Pasco had developed various problems that the Cornish craftsmen could not fix until Trevithick arrived. Trevithick managed the repairs, and supervised installation of a second pumping engine at the start of 1818. Uville and Trevithick began to argue about control of the company which was struggling badly from lack of capital and lack of fuel for the machines. Uville claimed that it was only through his efforts that steam engines had been brought to Peru, demanded complete control of the mining operation, and made every effort to undermine Trevithick's position. Trevithick left the mines in disgust, but turned back when he heard of Uville's death. Uville's death in August 1818 was "in consequence of the cold penetrating air of the Cordilleras on coming out of the mines in a strong perspiration."

== Later events ==
With Uville dead, Trevithick was placed in full control of the mines. The fuel problem was solved when rich coal seams were found near to the pumping site, and by the end of 1819 there were three pumping engines in operation and the future of the company seemed secure. However, the Peruvian War of Independence disrupted operations. On 27 October 1820 Cerro de Pasco was occupied by a patriot army under General Juan Antonio Álvarez de Arenales. At the start of December royalist forces recaptured Cerro de Pasco, but on 9 December Arenales defeated the royalists. This was the start of four years of fighting in the region. The mines were taken and retaken, skilled workers fled or were conscripted, and silver production came to a halt. Operations resumed at the mines in 1825, but only one pumping engine was working. In 1828 a boiler burst and the last engine was abandoned.

== Sources ==
- Dickinson, H. W.; Titley, Arthur (2010-10-31), Richard Trevithick: The Engineer and the Man, Cambridge University Press, ISBN 978-1-108-01635-3
- Directors of the Peruvian Mining Company (1825), Address to the Shareholders, W. Phillips
- "Don Francisco Uville", Grace's Guide to British Industrial History
- Fisher, John (February 1975), "Silver Production in the Viceroyalty of Peru, 1776-1824", The Hispanic American Historical Review, 55 (1), Published by: Duke University Press: 25–43, doi:10.2307/2512735, JSTOR 2512735
- McGowan, Christopher (2013-08-13), Rail, Steam, and Speed: The "Rocket" and the Birth of Steam Locomotion, Columbia University Press, ISBN 978-0-231-50930-5
- Payton, Philip (2005), The Cornish Overseas: A History of Cornwall's 'great Emigration', Dundurn, ISBN 978-1-904880-04-2
- Skempton, A. W. (2002), A Biographical Dictionary of Civil Engineers in Great Britain and Ireland: 1500-1830, Thomas Telford, ISBN 978-0-7277-2939-2
- Stuart, Robert (1829), Descriptive History of the steam engine
- Trevithick, Francis (1872), Life of Richard Trevithick : with an account of his inventions, vol. 2, London, New York: E. & F.N. Spon
