= Qawi =

Mountain in Peru

- Location within Peru

Highest point
- Elevation: 5,100 m (16,700 ft)
- Coordinates: 10°51′09″S 76°35′14″W

Geography
- Location: Peru, Lima Region
- Parent range: Andes

Qawi (Quechua for to put into the sun, hispanicized spelling Jahui) is a mountain in the Andes of Peru, about 5,100 metres (16,732 ft) high. It is located in the Lima Region, Huaura Province, Santa Leonor District, in the Oyón Province, Oyón District, and in the Pasco Region, Pasco Province, Huayllay District.
