= Yana Mach'ay =

Mountain in Peru

- Location within Peru

Highest point
- Elevation: 5,000 m (16,000 ft)
- Coordinates: 10°47′41″S 76°37′31″W

Geography
- Location: Peru, Lima Region, Pasco Region
- Parent range: Andes

Yana Mach'ay (Quechua yana black, mach'ay cave, "black cave", also spelled Yanamachay) is a mountain in the Andes of Peru, about 5,000 m (16,000 ft) high. It is located in the Lima Region, Oyón Province, Oyón District, and in the Pasco Region, Pasco Province, Huayllay District.
