= Santa Ana de Tusi District =

Santa Ana de Tusi
- District
- Interactive map of Santa Ana de Tusi
- Coordinates: 10°27′16″S 76°19′27″W
- Country: Peru
- Region: Pasco
- Province: Daniel Alcides Carrión
- Founded: January 12, 1956
- Capital: Santa Ana de Tusi

Area
  - Total: 353.11 km^{2} (136.34 sq mi)
- Elevation: 3,760 m (12,340 ft)

Population (2005 census)
  - Total: 14,904
  - Density: 42.208/km^{2} (109.32/sq mi)
- Time zone: UTC-5 (PET)
- UBIGEO: 190206

Santa Ana de Tusi District is one of eight districts of the province Daniel Alcides Carrión in Peru.

== See also ==
- Allqaqucha
