= Putaqa (Pasco) =

Mountain in Peru

- Location within Peru

Highest point
- Elevation: 4,000 m (13,000 ft)
- Coordinates: 10°43′35″S 75°44′45″W

Geography
- Location: Peru, Pasco Region
- Parent range: Andes

Putaqa (Quechua for Rumex peruanus, also spelled Putaja) is a mountain in Peru which reaches a height of approximately 4,000 m (13,000 ft). It is located in the Pasco Region, Pasco Province, Paucartambo District.
