= Chaupimarca District =

Coordinates: 10.6834°S 76.2549°W

Chaupimarca Chawpimarka
- District
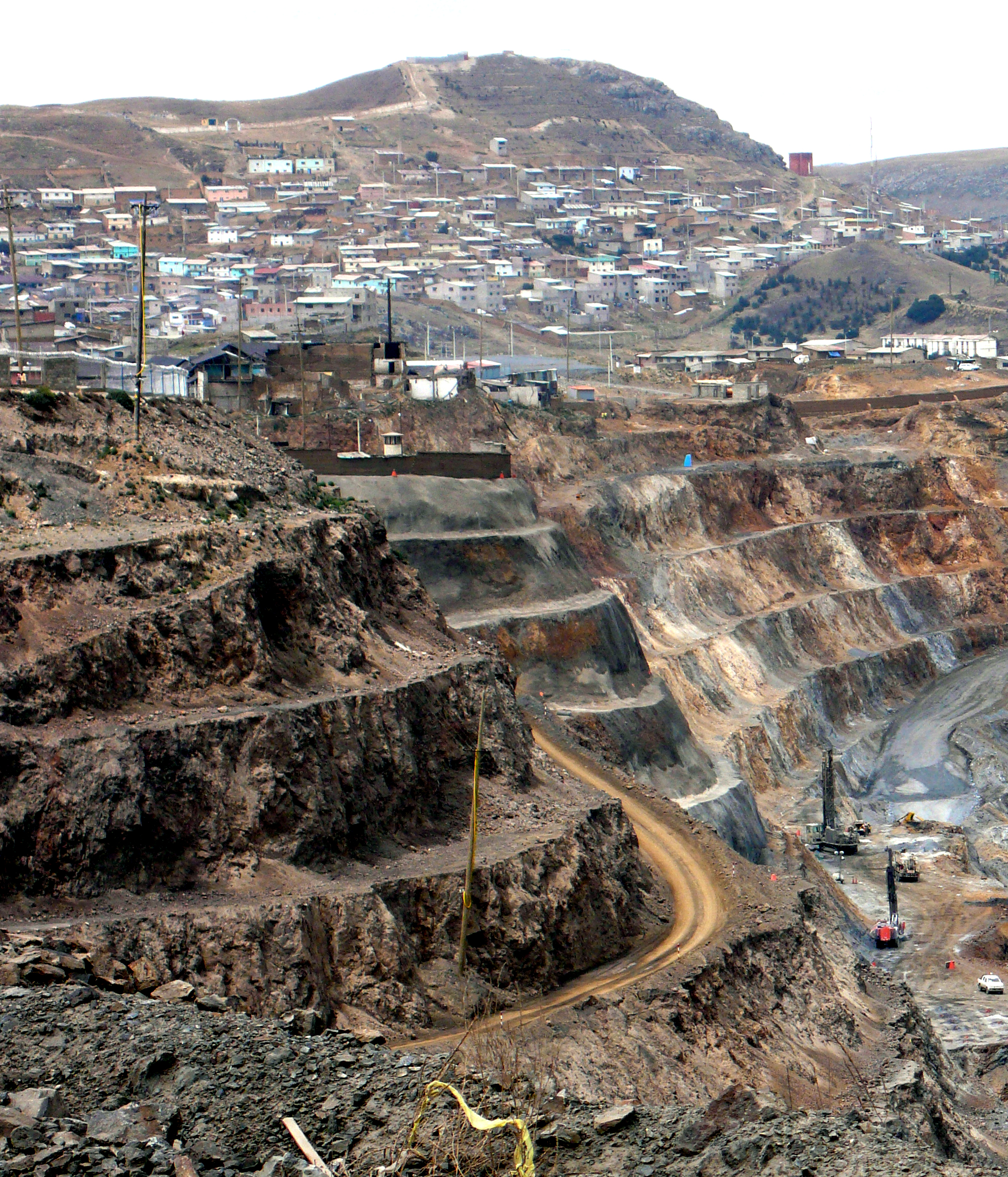
- Mining activities in Cerro de Pasco, the capital of the Chaupimarca district and the Pasco Region
- Interactive map of Chaupimarca
- Country: Peru
- Region: Pasco
- Province: Pasco
- Founded: November 27, 1944
- Capital: Cerro de Pasco

Area
  - Total: 6.66 km^{2} (2.57 sq mi)
- Elevation: 4,338 m (14,232 ft)

Population (2005 census)
  - Total: 29,101
  - Density: 4,370/km^{2} (11,300/sq mi)
- Time zone: UTC-5 (PET)
- UBIGEO: 190101

Chaupimarca (hispanicized spelling from Quechua Chawpimarka, chawpi central, middle, marka village, "central village") is one of thirteen districts of the province Pasco in Peru.
