= Kunturmarka, Pasco =

Archaeological site in Peru

Kunturmarka
- Location: Peru, Pasco Region, Pasco Province
- Region: Andes

Kunturmarka (Quechua kuntur condor, marka village / storey, Hispanicized spelling Condormarca) is an archaeological site in Peru. It is situated in the Pasco Region, Pasco Province, Paucartambo District. The complex consists of round buildings and stone tombs (chullpa).

== See also ==
- Markapukyu
- Qaqapatan
- Q'illaywasin
