= Markapukyu =

Archaeological site in Peru

Coordinates: 10.4904°S 76.1965°W

- Interactive map of Markapukyu
- Location: Peru, Pasco Region, Pasco Province
- Region: Andes

Site notes
- Height: 3,787 metres (12,425 ft)

Markapukyu (Hispanicized spelling Marcapuquio) is an archaeological site in Peru. It is situated in the Pasco Region, Pasco Province, Yarusyacán District, at a height of 3,787 metres (12,425 ft). The name is derived from Quechua marka, meaning 'village' or 'storey', and pukyu, meaning 'spring of water',

== See also ==
- Kunturmarka
- Qaqapatan
- Q'illaywasin
