= Kuchpanqa =

Mountain in Peru

- Location within Peru

Highest point
- Elevation: 5,100 m (16,700 ft)
- Coordinates: 10°45′23″S 76°35′42″W

Geography
- Location: Peru, Pasco Region
- Parent range: Andes

Kuchpanqa (Quechua kuchpay to roll, -nqa an archaic nominalising suffix to indicate a place destinated for something, "(place) for rolling something", hispanicized spelling Cuchpanga) is a mountain at a small lake of that name in the Andes of Peru, about 5,100 metres (16,732 ft) high. It is located in the Pasco Region, Pasco Province, in the districts of and Huayllay and Simón Bolívar.
