= Ninacaca District =

Coordinates: 10.8562°S 76.1091°W

Ninacaca Nina Qaqa
- District
- Interactive map of Ninacaca
- Country: Peru
- Region: Pasco
- Province: Pasco
- Founded: January 2, 1857
- Capital: Ninacaca

Government
  - Mayor: Augusto Elias Alania Huaricapcha

Area
  - Total: 508.92 km^{2} (196.50 sq mi)
- Elevation: 4,140 m (13,580 ft)

Population (2005 census)
  - Total: 4,742
  - Density: 9.318/km^{2} (24.13/sq mi)
- Time zone: UTC-5 (PET)
- UBIGEO: 190105

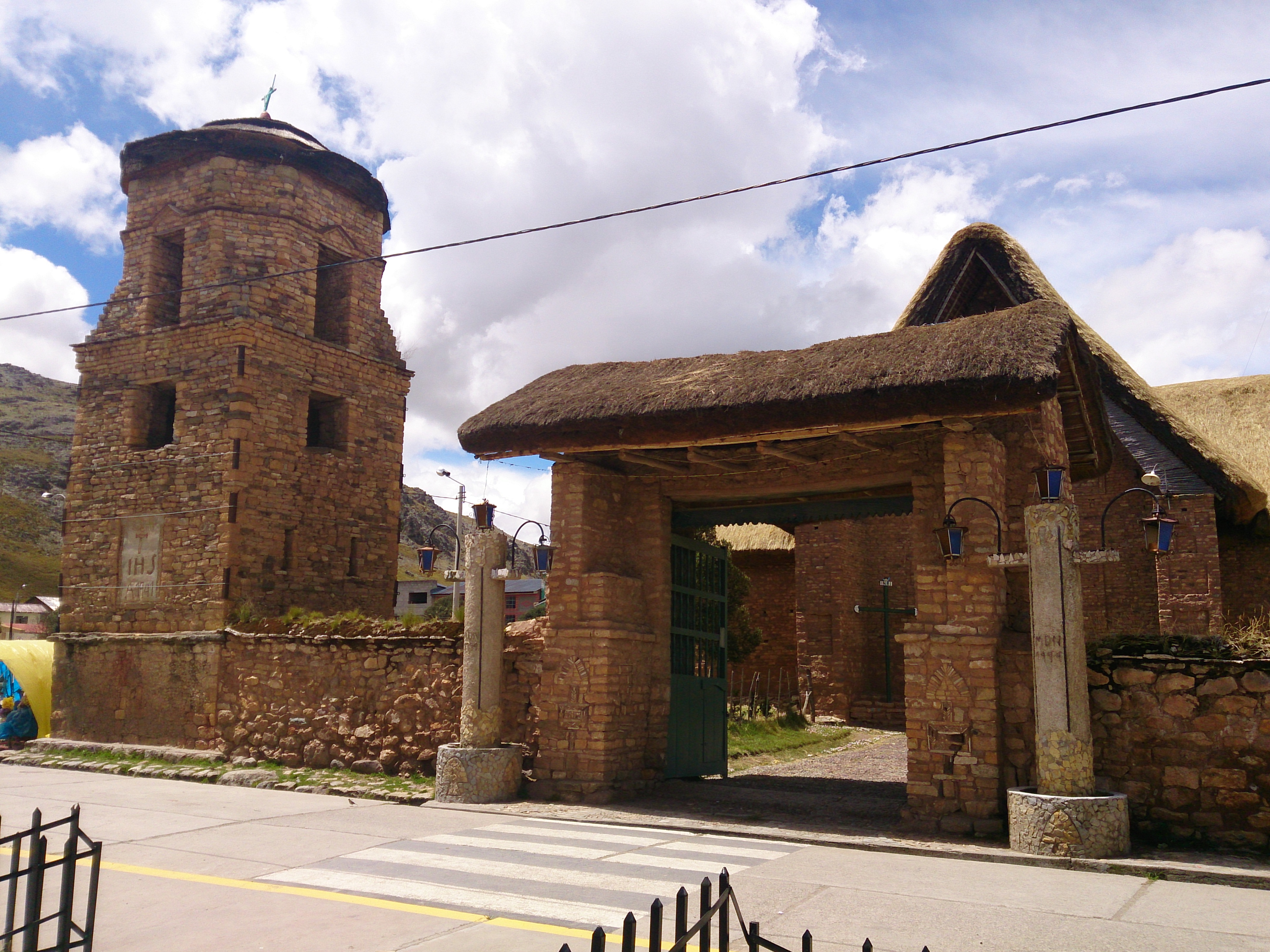

Ninacaca (from Quechua Nina Qaqa, meaning "fire rock") is one of thirteen districts of the Pasco Province in Peru.

== Geography ==
One of the highest peaks of the district is Rak'ina at approximately 4,600 m (15,100 ft). Other mountains are listed below:

- Añas Kiski
- Awki
- Kanchas Punta
- Kuntur
- Kuntur Sinqa
- Lawa Kunka
- Llama Lluchk'a
- Misa Pata
- Qallu Sankha
- Rinri Uchku
- Runtunniyuq
- Saqra Chuku
- Sima Qucha
- Tuku Mach'ay
- T'uru Rumi
- Wayllapayuq
- Yana Ututu
