= Huariaca District =

Coordinates: 10.4434°S 76.1873°W

Huariaca
- District
- Interactive map of Huariaca
- Country: Peru
- Region: Pasco
- Province: Pasco
- Capital: Huariaca

Government
  - Mayor: Edmar Andres Yngunza Mendoza

Area
  - Total: 133.07 km^{2} (51.38 sq mi)
- Elevation: 2,941 m (9,649 ft)

Population (2005 census)
  - Total: 7,897
  - Density: 59.34/km^{2} (153.7/sq mi)
- Time zone: UTC-5 (PET)
- UBIGEO: 190103

Huariaca District is one of thirteen districts of the province Pasco in Peru.

== See also ==
- Pichqa Pukyu
