= Lake Pomacocha (Pasco) =

Lake in Pasco, Peru

Pomacocha
- Location within Peru
- Location: Pasco Region
- Coordinates: 10°40′51″S 76°38′12″W
- Basin countries: Peru

Lake Pomacocha (possibly from Quechua puma cougar, puma, qucha lake) is a lake in Peru located in the Pasco Region, Pasco Province, Simón Bolívar District.
