= San Francisco de Asís de Yarusyacán District =

Coordinates: 10.5411°S 76.2282°W

San Francisco de Asis de Yarusyacán
- District
- Interactive map of San Francisco de Asis de Yarusyacán
- Country: Peru
- Region: Pasco
- Province: Pasco
- Founded: September 16, 1961
- Capital: Yarusyacán

Government
  - Mayor: Jorge Raul Colqui Cabello

Area
  - Total: 117.7 km^{2} (45.4 sq mi)
- Elevation: 3,770 m (12,370 ft)

Population (2005 census)
  - Total: 12,027
  - Density: 102.2/km^{2} (264.7/sq mi)
- Time zone: UTC-5 (PET)
- UBIGEO: 190108

San Francisco de Asis de Yarusyacán District is one of thirteen districts of the province Pasco in Peru.

== See also ==
- Markapukyu
- Qaqapatan
