= Simón Bolívar District, Peru =

Coordinates: 10.7071°S 76.4239°W

Simón Bolívar District
- District
- Interactive map of Simón Bolívar District
- Country: Peru
- Region: Pasco
- Province: Pasco
- Founded: April 15, 1955
- Capital: San Antonio de Rancas

Government
  - Mayor: Celestino Ureta Atachagua

Area
  - Total: 697.15 km^{2} (269.17 sq mi)
- Elevation: 4,200 m (13,800 ft)

Population (2005 census)
  - Total: 14,005
  - Density: 20.089/km^{2} (52.030/sq mi)
- Time zone: UTC-5 (PET)
- UBIGEO: 190109

Simón Bolívar District is one of thirteen districts of the province Pasco in Peru.

== See also ==
- Allqaqucha
- Kuchpanqa
- Luliqucha
- Pumaqucha
