= Guellayhuasin =

Archaeological site in Peru

- Location within Peru
- 10°24′42.09″S 76°14′9.25″W
- Location: Peru; Pasco Region, Pasco Province
- Region: Andes

Site notes
- Height: 3,167 metres (10,390 ft)

Guellayhuasin (possibly from Quechua q'illay iron, wasi house) is an archaeological site in Peru. It is located northwest of the village of Pallanchacra, in the region of Pasco, at an elevation of 3,167 metres (10,390 ft).

== See also ==
- Kunturmarka
- Markapukyu
- Qaqapatan
