= Pasco province =

Coordinates: 10°41′24″S 76°16′12″W

Pasco Province
- Province
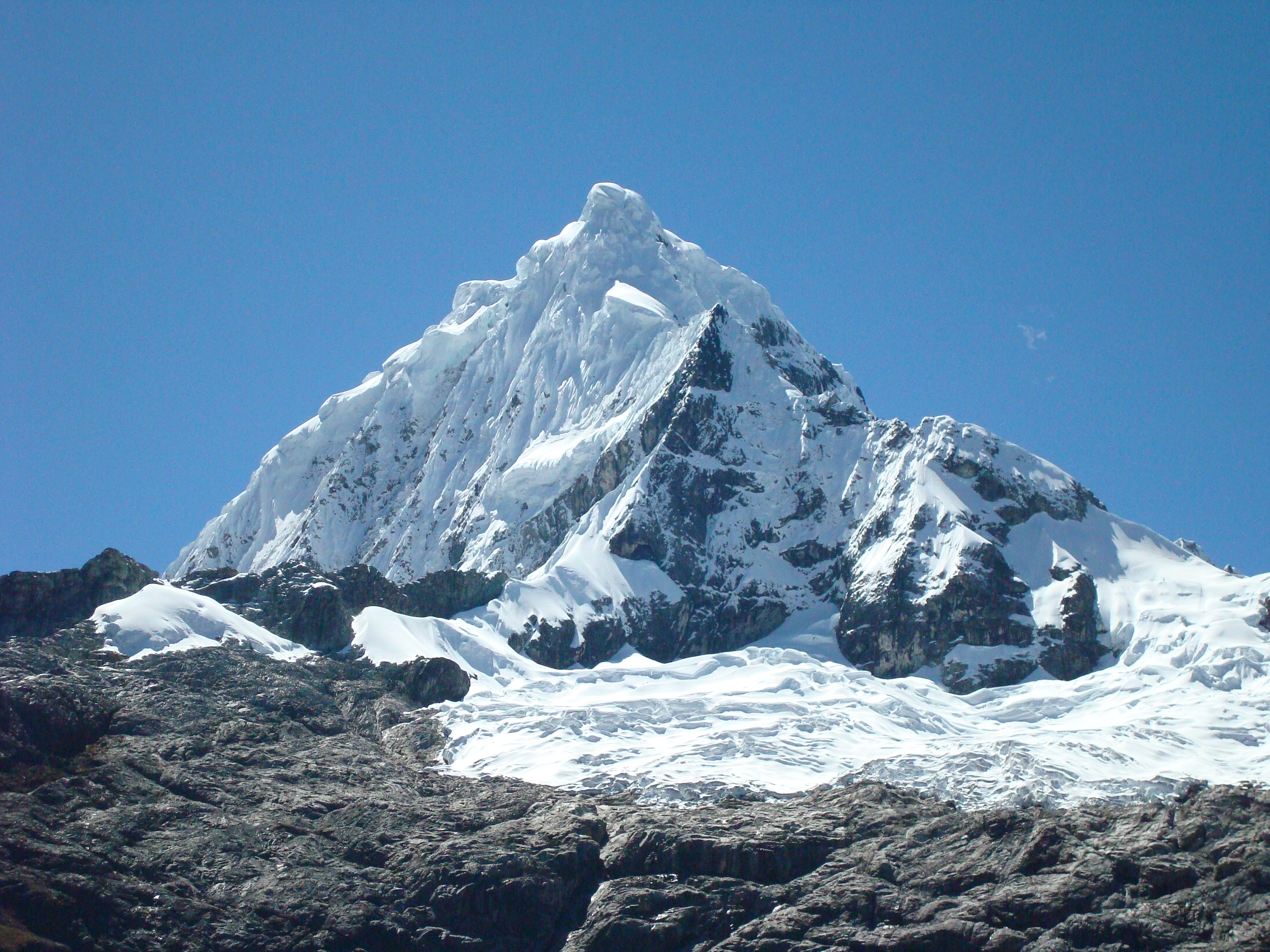
- Waqurunchu, one of the highest mountains of the Pasco Province

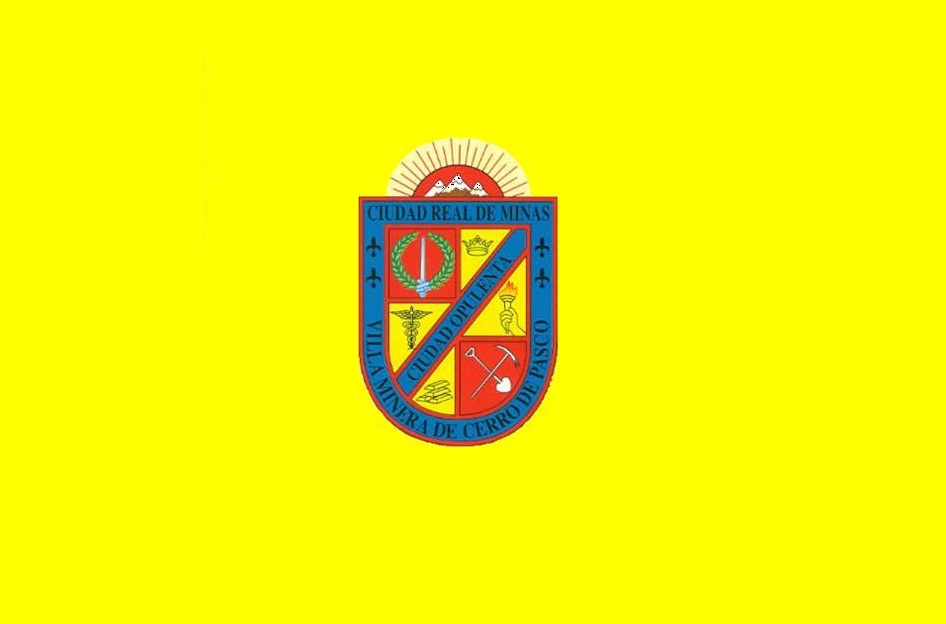
- Flag

- Location of Pasco in the Pasco Region
- Country: Peru
- Region: Pasco
- Capital: Cerro de Pasco

Government
  - Mayor: Marco Antonio De la Cruz Bustillos (2019-2022)

Area
  - Total: 4,758.57 km^{2} (1,837.29 sq mi)

Population
  - Total: 123,015
  - Density: 25.8513/km^{2} (66.9544/sq mi)
- UBIGEO: 1901
- Website: www.munipasco.gob.pe

Pasco is one of the three provinces that make up the Pasco Region in Peru. The capital of this province is the city Cerro de Pasco.

== Boundaries ==
- North: Huánuco Region
- East: province of Oxapampa
- South: Junín Region
- West: Lima Region, province of Daniel A. Carrión

== Geography ==
The Waqurunchu mountain range traverses the province. One of the highest mountains of the province is Waqurunchu at 5,748 m (18,858 ft). Other mountain are listed below:

- Anka Wachanan
- Añilqucha
- Awki
- Challwash
- Chuqimayu
- Hamp'atu
- Hatun Ukru
- Hatun Waqya
- Kasha Pata
- Kimaqucha
- Kiswar Mach'ay
- Kuchpanqa
- Kurawniyuq
- Luliqucha
- Luychu
- Luychuqucha
- Llama Lluchka
- Manka P'ukru
- Marayniyuq
- Millpu
- Mina Kasha
- Mishi Waqanan
- Muruqucha
- Ñat'iqucha
- Ñawsan
- Ñawsanqa
- Ñawsaqucha
- Pachapa Simin
- Parya Punta
- Pichqa Pukyu
- Pirwa Hirka
- Puka Uru
- Pukaqucha
- Puma Hirka
- Puma Wayin
- Putaqa
- Ranra Tampu
- Qaqa Mach'ay
- Qawi
- Qiwllaqucha
- Ranra Tampu
- Raqray
- Saqra Mach'ay
- Shaywa Punta
- Tampu Raqra
- Tawllish
- Tinyaqucha
- T'uru Hirka
- Uskhu Raqra
- Wachwa Rumi
- Wallqash Hanka
- Wank'a Wank'a
- Waqay Rumi
- Waqurunchu (Huá.-Pas.)
- Waraqu
- Warmi Chuku
- Waswas
- Waychaw Wachanan
- Wayrachina
- Yana Chaka
- Yana Chuku
- Yana K'uchu
- Yana Mach'ay
- Yanaqucha (Huachón)
- Yuraq Mit'u

== Administrative division ==
The province has an area of 4,758.57 square kilometers (1,837.29 sq mi) and is divided into thirteen districts.

- Chaupimarca
- Huachón
- Huariaca
- Huayllay
- Ninacaca
- Pallanchacra
- Paucartambo
- San Francisco de Asís de Yarusyacán
- Simón Bolívar
- Ticlacayán
- Tinyahuarco
- Vicco
- Yanacancha

== Population ==
The province has an approximate population of 123,015 inhabitants (2017).

== See also ==
- Administrative divisions of Peru

- Allqaqucha
- Kunturmarka
- Markapukyu
- Pumaqucha
- Qaqapatan
- Q'illaywasin
- Upamayu Dam
- Warunqucha
- Wat'aqucha
- Wayllay National Sanctuary
- Yanaqucha (Huayllay)
- Yanaqucha (Tinyahuarco)
