= S&P/BVL Peru General Index =

Peruvian stock market index

The S&P/BVL Peru General Index (SPBLPGPT; formerly IGBVL: Indice General de la Bolsa de Valores de Lima; English: General Index of the Lima Stock Exchange) is the main index of the Lima Stock Exchange. It is designed to serve as a broad benchmark for the Peruvian stock market, tracking the performance of the largest and most frequently traded stocks on the Lima Exchange.

The S&P/BVL Peru General Index is rebalanced annually in September for updates to the composition, shares outstanding, investable weight factors and constituent weights. In addition, the index is reweighted quarterly in March, June and December.
