= Paucartambo District, Pasco =

Coordinates: 10.7623°S 75.7354°W

Paucartambo Pawqar Tampu
- District
- Interactive map of Paucartambo
- Country: Peru
- Region: Pasco
- Province: Pasco
- Founded: May 23, 1857
- Capital: Paucartambo

Area
  - Total: 704.83 km^{2} (272.14 sq mi)
- Elevation: 2,950 m (9,680 ft)

Population (2005 census)
  - Total: 18,445
  - Density: 26.169/km^{2} (67.779/sq mi)
- Time zone: UTC-5 (PET)
- UBIGEO: 190107

Paucartambo District (from Quechua: Pawqar Tampu, meaning "colored tambo") is one of thirteen districts of the province Pasco in Peru.

== Geography ==
One of the highest mountains of the district is Hanka K'uchu at approximately 4,600 m (15,100 ft). Other mountains are listed below:

- Awas Pata
- Challwash
- Chuchaw
- Ch'aki Qucha
- Hamp'atu
- Hatun Pata
- Kima Qucha
- Kima Ukru
- Kushuru
- Luychu Qucha
- Mata Qucha
- Micha Pallqa
- Pachapa Simin
- Paqcha Pata
- Putaqa
- Qiwlla Qucha
- Quyllu Mayu
- Sima Qucha
- Sima Warmi
- Tawllish
- T'uru Qucha
- Uman Tullu
- Wanchur Wayin
- Wanin Punta
- Waqanan
- Warmi Chuku
- Yana Qucha

== See also ==
- Kunturmarka
