= Tinyahuarco District =

Coordinates: 10.7653°S 76.2483°W

Tinyahuarco Tinya Warkhu
- District
- Interactive map of Tinyahuarco
- Country: Peru
- Region: Pasco
- Province: Pasco
- Founded: September 12, 1917
- Capital: Tinyahuarco

Government
  - Mayor: Oscar Alcides Espinoza Trelles

Area
  - Total: 94.49 km^{2} (36.48 sq mi)
- Elevation: 4,275 m (14,026 ft)

Population (2005 census)
  - Total: 5,784
  - Density: 61.21/km^{2} (158.5/sq mi)
- Time zone: UTC-5 (PET)
- UBIGEO: 190111

Tinyahuarco (Hispanicized spelling of Tinya Warkhu, a Quechua term, tinya a kind of drum, warkhu hanging) is one of thirteen districts of the province Pasco Province in the Pasco Region of Peru.

== See also ==
- Yanaqucha
