= Lima Stock Exchange =

Stock exchange in Lima, Peru

Coordinates: 12°02′54.88″S 77°01′52.94″W

- Bolsa de Valores de Lima
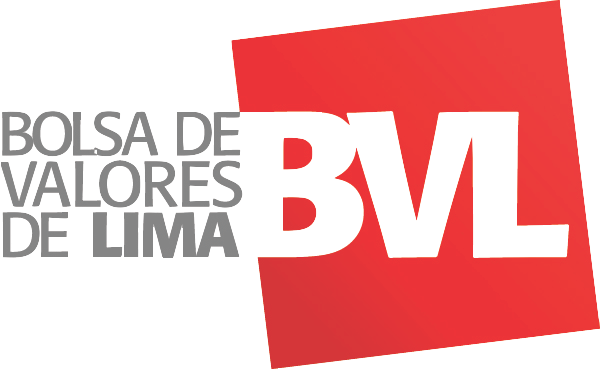

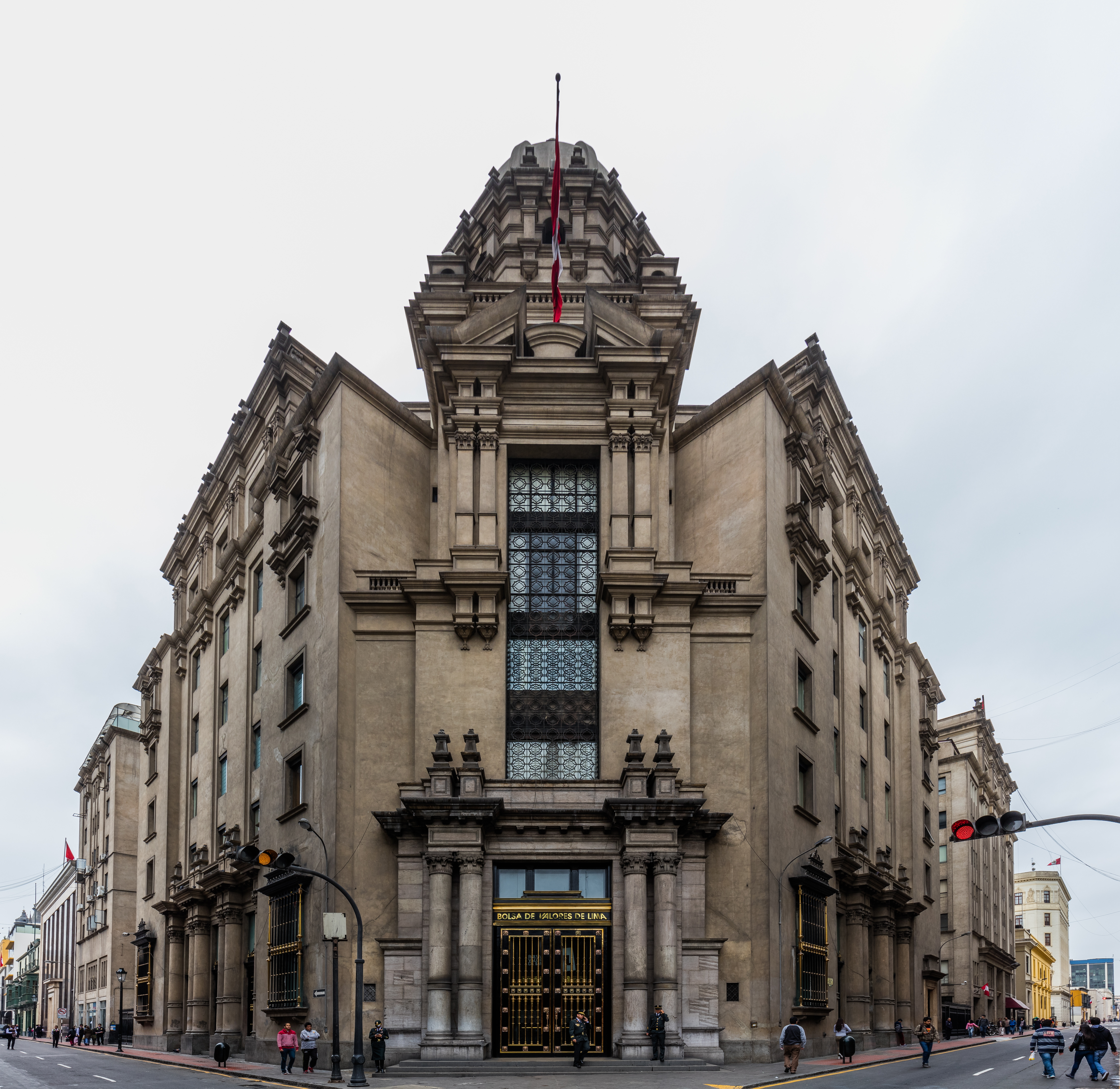
- Type: Stock Exchange
- Location: Lima, Peru
- Founded: December 31, 1860
- Key people: Francis Stenning (CEO); Roberto Hoyle
- Currency: S/.
- Market cap: USD 120.948 billion (November 2016)
- Indices: S&P/BVL Peru General Index
- Website: www.bvl.com.pe

The Lima Stock Exchange (Spanish: Bolsa de Valores de Lima, BVL) is the stock exchange of Peru, located in the capital Lima. It has several indices. The S&P/BVL Peru General Index (formerly IGBVL) is a value-weighted index that tracks the performance of the largest and most frequently traded stocks on the Lima Exchange.

Other indices are S&P/BVL Peru Select and S&P/BVL Lima 25.

The Lima Stock Exchange is a member of the United Nations Sustainable Stock Exchanges initiative.

Sectors in the Lima Stock Exchange:

- Sector Agriculture
- Sector Banks and Finance
- Sector Diversified
- Sector Industries
- Sector Mining
- Sector Services

== See also ==
- Economy of Peru
- List of stock exchanges
- List of American stock exchanges
