= Huayllay National Sanctuary =

Park in Peru

- Santuario Nacional de Huayllay
- IUCN category III (natural monument or feature)
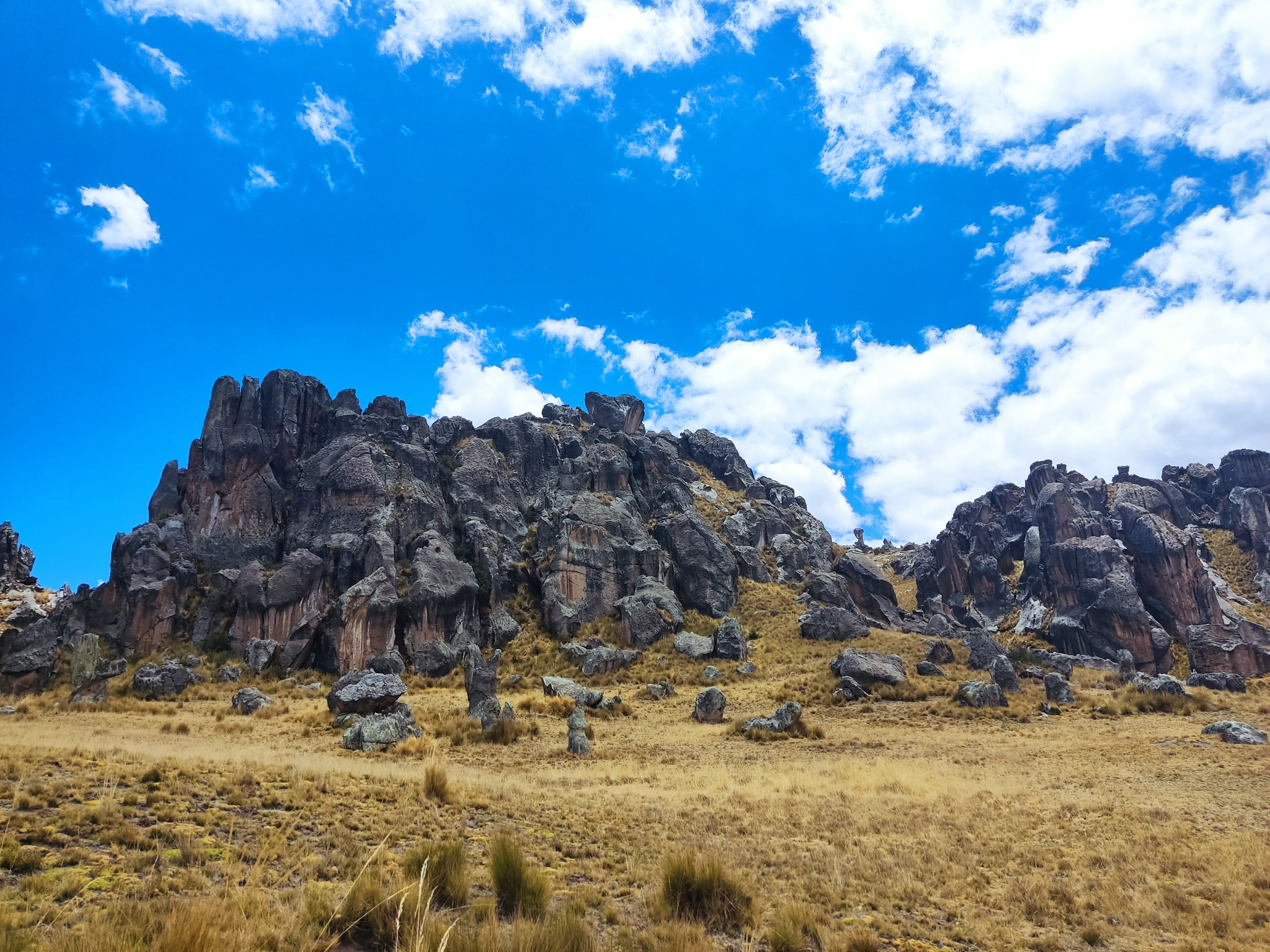
- Rock formations at Huayllay.

- Location within Peru
- Location: Peru; Pasco
- Coordinates: 11°00′01″S 76°21′57″W
- Governing body: SERNANP
- Website: Santuario Nacional de Huayllay (in Spanish)

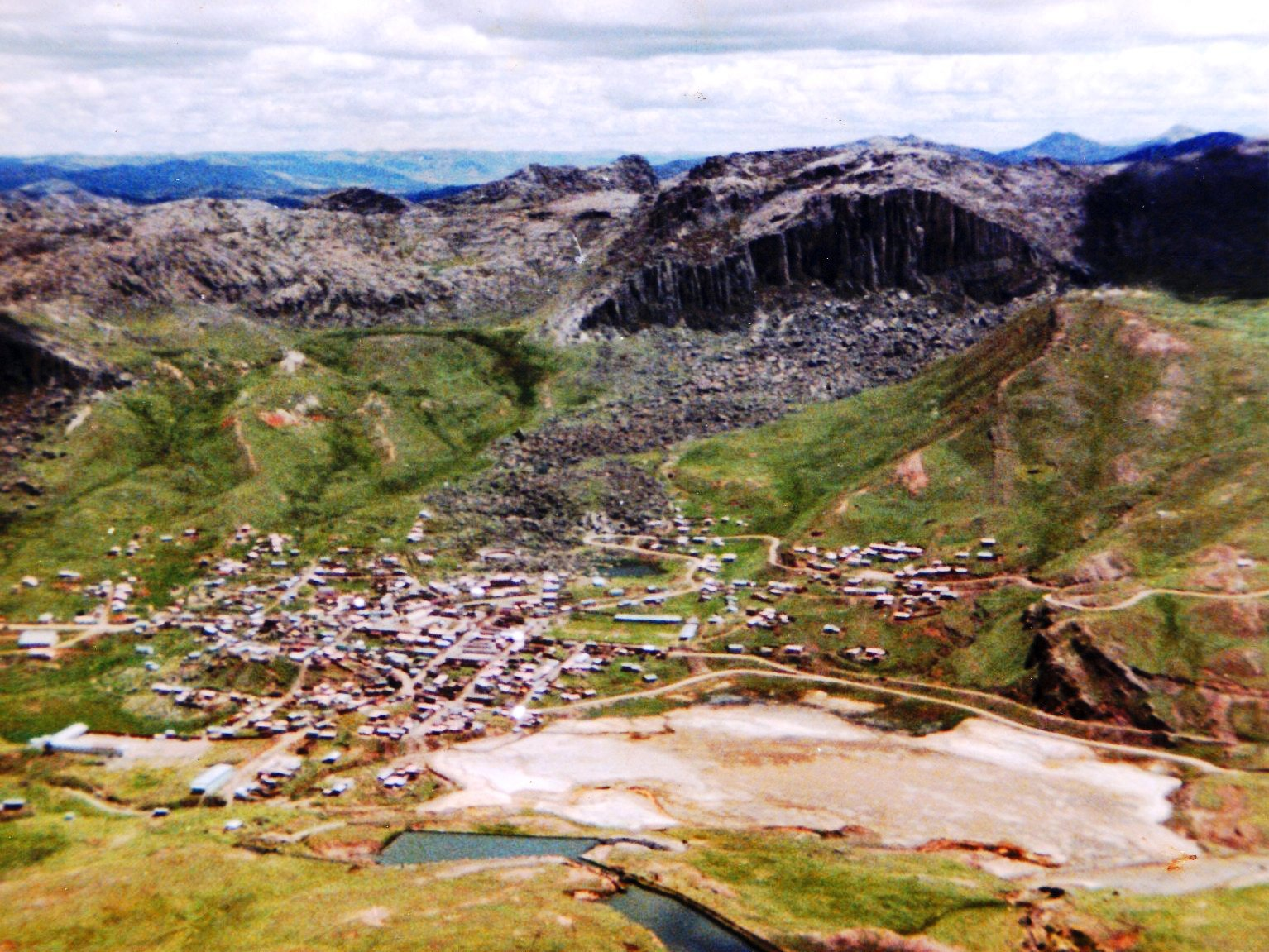
Huayllay (1982) with the Huayllay National Sanctuary in the background.

Huayllay National Sanctuary is a park in Peru located in the Meseta of Bombón in the Huayllay District of Pasco Region. The sanctuary is noted for the large scenic rock formations of the rock forest of Huayllay (Spanish: Bosque de Rocas) and its native plants and animals.

== Geology ==
The rock formations date to the beginning of the Cenozoic age. They were initially formed when volcanic activity deposited layers of hardened volcanic ash, or ignimbrite on the landscape, forming a plateau atop layers of sandstone, limestone, and conglomerate. Ignimbrite is a porous rock, so it is particularly vulnerable to erosion. Approximately 20,000 years ago, during the most recent ice age, the cycle of freezing, thawing, and re-freezing of snow on the plateau caused meltwater to filter into the cracks in the rock and enlarge them. Eventually, this resulted in large portions of the rock crumbling away, leaving the deeply eroded formations that now comprise the Bosque de Rocas.

The formations are sometimes compared to Shilin Stone Forest in China and Garden of the Gods in the US, as these locations are also dramatically eroded landscapes.

== Recreation ==
The rock forest is a major tourist attraction in Peru, for both hiking and sightseeing. It is also an international destination for rock climbers.

== Extension and climate ==
The surface area of the district is 607 km^{2} (234 sq mi). The climate is cold and dry, with temperatures that vary between 13.8 and −8 °C (56.8 and 17.6 °F).
