= Huascacocha (Carhuacayan) =

Lake in Peru

- Location within Peru
- Location: Peru; Junín Region
- Coordinates: 11°05′22″S 76°24′44″W
- Max. length: 5.10 km (3.17 mi)
- Max. width: 0.95 km (0.59 mi)
- Surface elevation: 4,484 m (14,711 ft)
Huascacocha Dam
- Location within Peru
- Country: Peru
- Opening date: 2012

Huascacocha (possibly from Quechua waskha (also waska) rope, qucha lake,) is a lake in Peru located in the Junín Region, Yauli Province, Carhuacayan District. It is situated at a height of approximately 4,484 m (14,711 ft), about 5.10 km long and 0.95 km at its widest point.

In 2012 the Huascacocha dam was inaugurated. The dam lies was erected at the southeastern end of the lake.

== See also ==
- List of lakes in Peru
