= Cerro de Pasco =

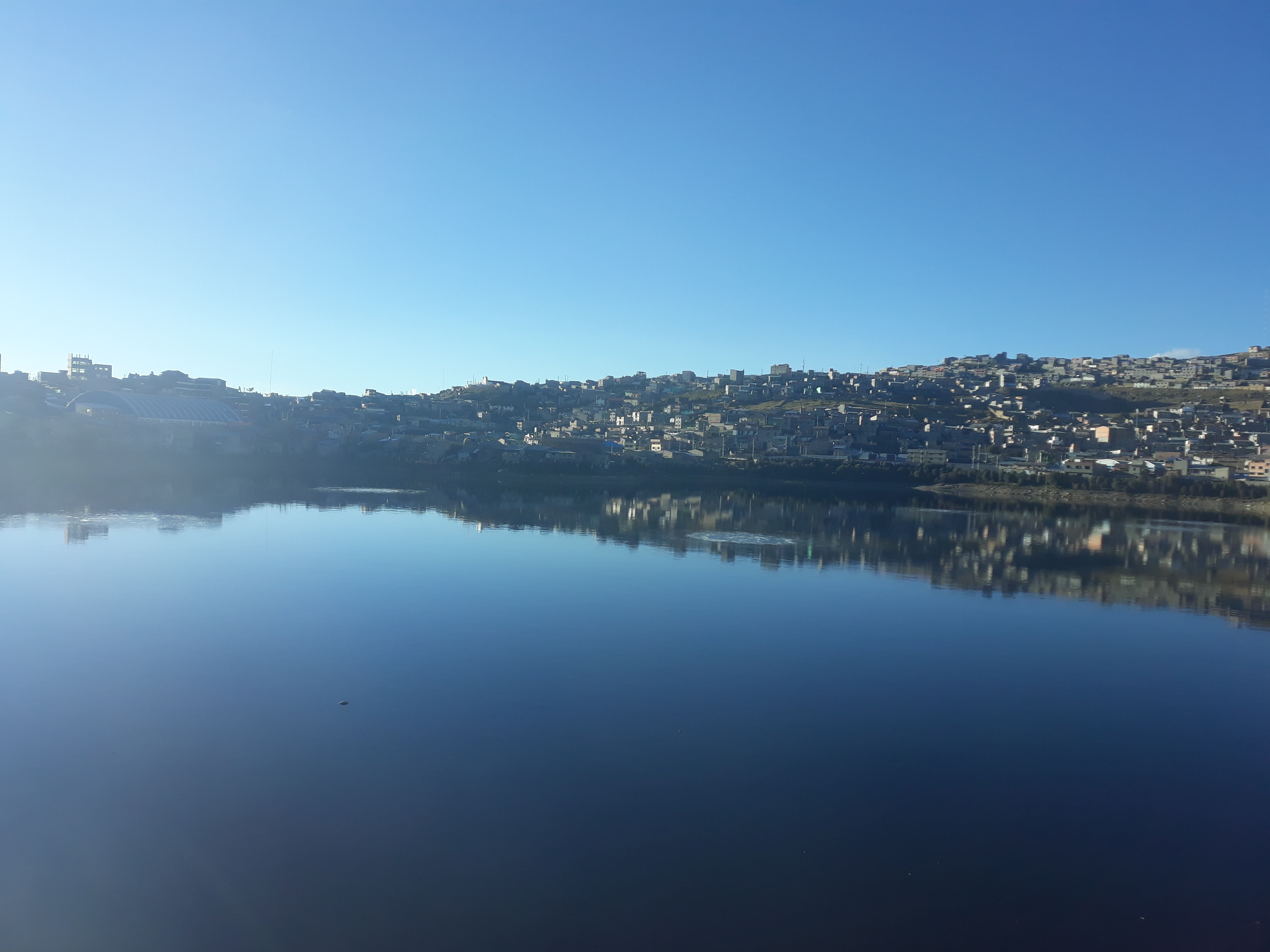
- Lake Patarcocha in the city

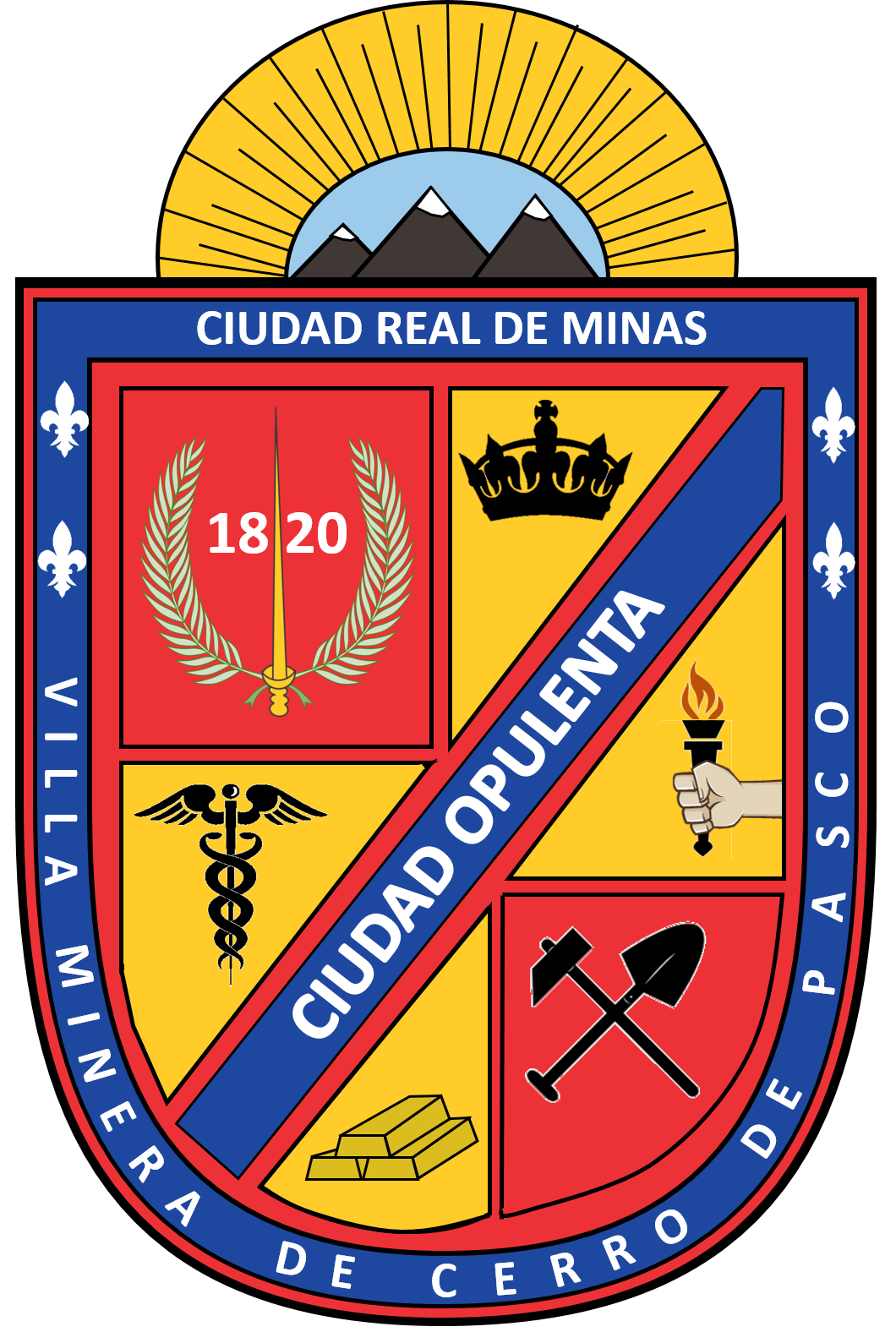
- Coat of arms

- Location within Peru
- Coordinates: 10°41′11″S 76°15′45″W
- Country: Peru
- Region: Pasco
- Province: Pasco
- Founded: 20 October 1578

Government
  - Mayor: Marco Antonio De la Cruz Bustillos (2019-2022)
- Elevation: 4,330 m (14,210 ft)

Population (2017)
  - Total: 58,899
  - Estimate (2015): 66,272
- Demonym: Cerreño (a)

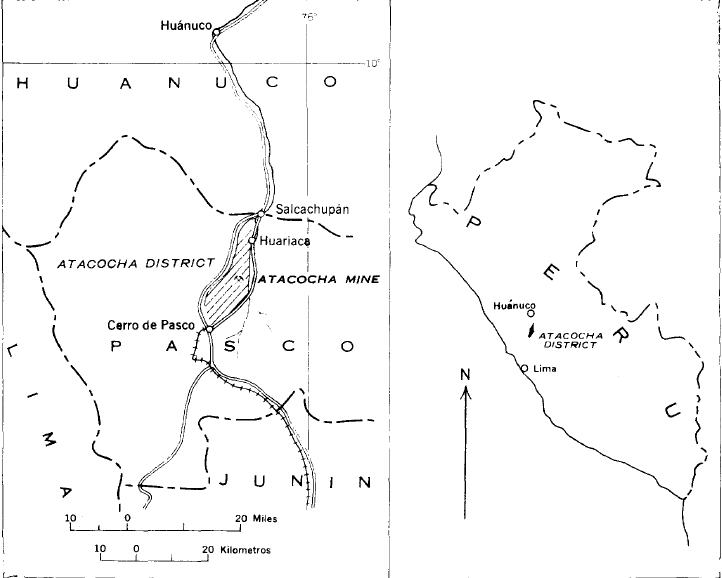
Location of Cerro de Pasco and the Atacocha Mine

Cerro de Pasco is a city in central Peru, located at the top of the Andean Mountains. It is the capital of both the Pasco Province and the Department of Pasco, and an important mining center of silver, copper, zinc and lead. At an elevation of 4,330 metres (14,210 ft), it is one of the highest cities in the world, and with a population of 58,899, it is the highest or the second highest city with over 50,000 inhabitants. The elevation reaches up to 4,380 metres (14,370 ft) in the Yanacancha area. The city has a very intense cold climate and it is connected by road and by rail (via Ferrocarril Central Andino) to the capital Lima, 300 kilometres (190 mi) away. Its urban area is formed by the districts of Chaupimarca, Yanacancha and Simón Bolívar.

== Mining center ==
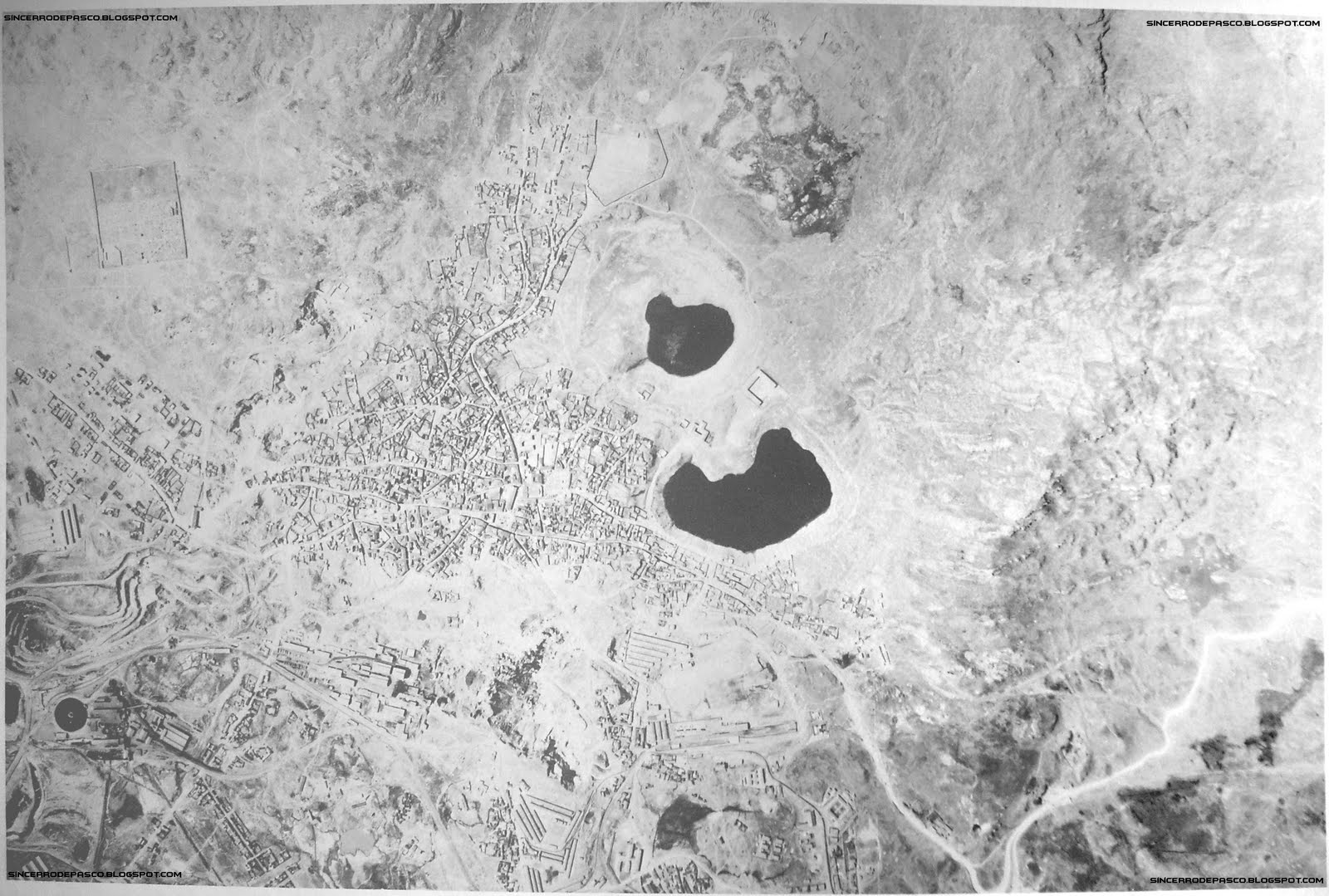
Aerial view of Cerro de Pasco in 1956

Originally known as Villa de Pasco, the settlement's origins were as a mining town dating from 1578.

Cerro de Pasco became one of the world's richest silver producing areas after silver was discovered there in 1630. It is still an active mining center. The Spanish mined the rich Cerro de Pasco silver-bearing oxide ore deposits since colonial times. Sulfide minerals are more common in the Atacocha district however.

Francisco Uville arranged for steam engines made by Richard Trevithick of Cornwall, England, to be installed in Cerro de Pasco in 1816 to pump water from the mines and allow lower levels to be reached. However, fighting in the Peruvian War of Independence brought production to a halt from 1820 to 1825. Between 1826 and 1829, Mariano Eduardo de Rivero y Ustáriz, then Peru's director general of mining, made repeated visits to the district. He worked on the Quiulacocha socavón, took up the reorganisation of the local miners' guild, and pressed for steam power to be used more systematically in the workings; coal from the Rancas seams nearby was used to fire pumping engines in flooded mines. His description of the district ran across four issues of the Memorial de Ciencias Naturales, the Lima journal he edited, in 1828 and 1829, and was later translated into English and French.

Three major mines in the area include the Machcan, Atacocha, and Milpo. Silver ore occurs in hydrothermal veins or as sulfides and clay minerals replacing the Jurassic Pucara limestone. Porphyry dacite stocks are found intruded near the Atacocha and Milpo mines along the Atacocha Fault. Compania Minera Atacocha started operations at the Atacocha Mine in 1936. Ore minerals include galena and sphalerite.

The ore bodies deposited through hydrothermal veins resulted from late-stage volcanism in a caldera system. The volcanic activity reoccurred periodically, leading to dykes, increased fracturing, and subsidence. With the subsidence came increased accommodation for sedimentation. The fractures within the rock allowed for hydrothermal activity to flow within the strata. This in turn left behind the veins of galena and sphalerite found within the Pucara limestone. Further evidence of this hydrothermal activity can be found in the massive pyrite veins within the carbonate rock. Within the faulted areas of the limestone, black chert can be found. This chert, while not a primary ore body still contains some low grade Pb-Zn-Ag ore.

Contamination of the environment by lead, cadmium and other heavy metals has precipitated a public health crisis in the city, but a 2006 law proposing to evacuate all inhabitants and relocate the city has not yet culminated in concrete action.

== The United States "colony" ==
During the twentieth century, the United States contributed to railroad construction and Andean "progressive infrastructure" for all, even as gilded U.S. companies superseded Spain as the dominant resource extractors in Cerro de Pasco. The "American colony" that had emerged at the apex of the Andes, "the very roof of the world", garnered attention from an array of writers, including Frank G. Carpenter. His 1913 travel narrative of Cerro de Pasco, published in a number of popular periodicals the next year, brought the U.S. Andean community to life for U.S. reading publics. Almost two hundred miles from the Peruvian coastline, Carpenter had encountered an "American industrial center", a "foreign colony" sustained by "American money." Copper had captivated "American capitalists" and launched a Gilded Age investment frenzy in Cerro de Pasco.

In 1877, James Ben Ali Haggin, Alfred W. McCune, George Hearst, and gamonles planters organized the "Cerro de Pasco Syndicate to explore the possibility of developing the deposits in the Peruvian Highlands." Fifteen years later, in 1902, James Ben Ali Haggen sponsored a dinner party in New York, which "assembled several of the wealthiest American magnates of the time...'[b]efore the evening was over [Haggin] had raised $10 million capital to begin a project which would dominate the economic and social life of central Peru for the next three-quarters of a century.' Haggin alone put up $3 million that evening, retaining a 34 percent interest." By 1913, a "syndicate of some of our richest men have bought the mines here", from Haggin, J. P. Morgan, and Henry Clay Frick to Phoebe Hearst and the Vanderbilt family. "Today the prosperity of Cerro de Pasco, indeed this whole mining region", Carpenter proclaimed, "is dependent on American capital."

Present-day accounts of the twentieth-century colony all cite a ten-volume study of Cerro de Pasco, completed in 1997. Hundreds of concise sections in this survey of Andean cultural memory, written by local author César Pérez Arauco and sponsored by the Department of Pasco, spanned almost six chronological centuries of mining, vignettes, notable events, luminous personalities, and carnavales. Publications that refer to the books frequently attempt to elaborate and expand (and revise) on six specific volumes dedicated to twentieth-century stories, as well as on Carpenter's travel narrative. For example, "stone cottages" for married miners, engineers, and their families were, according to the Peruvian Mining and Engineering Institute (PMEI), townhomes with wrought-iron balconies. Small windows allowed pedestrians to view interior hallways and courtyards, while the balconies formed perimeter barriers for bedrooms. The dwellings overlooked wide boulevards and serpentine avenues such as Marques and Lima Streets, which spilled into the expansive Chaupimarca Square as well as the ancillary Las Culebras and León Squares. Dieguez Hotel and Europa Hotel on opposing sides of Lima Street substantiated Carpenter's dichotomy between so-called "bachelor" hotels for male students and new employees, long linked to escort establishments (hoteles andinos de hospitalidad legal), and the more familial Europa Hotel. In Carpenter's travel narrative, passages of which still require corroboration, the latter example was a "company" hotel operated by "Mr. Tocci, an Italian, and the manager of the hotel at the smelter, seven miles off, is a Mormon [from Salt Lake City]." Archival documents, oral history, DNA tests, and a limited amount of records of the "colony", including personal correspondence, material culture, photographs, legal documents, and diaries, have been maintained by families and have not yet become available to researchers.

Publications by the PMEI continue to emphasize the "cosmopolitan" contours of the U.S. colony. Carpenter likewise observed Canadians, Australians, Germans, Austrians, Irish(wo)men, Scandinavians, and expatriates from a "half dozen different nations" traipsing among U.S miners and indigenous Andean peoples. Carpenter seemed to especially marvel at the golf "clubhouses, with libraries and reading rooms supplied with the latest magazines and papers, and also bowling alleys, billiard halls and rooms for entertainments and dances." In 1914, Nelson Rousenvell and Victor Vaughen Morris extended a Cerro de Pasco satellite location of the (gentleman's) Club de la Unión, initially headquartered in Lima, with a "gambling saloon." Rousenvell then gave the resulting edifice a Las Culebras Square street entrance across from the Gallo Brothers commissary store. The street-level doors and second-floor front balcony both bore the Pasco shield emblem, welcoming only members (and for certain events, members' wives) of the renamed El Casino y Club de la Unión. Additional examples of clubs were the "Roof of the World" Masonic Lodge and Club del Fénix. All three admitted only the most high-ranking Cerro de Pasco Company officials, such as the assistant superintendent and then superintendent of mines, John Tinker Glidden.

The industrial center also featured tennis courts, baseball diamonds, and Esperanza Hospital. The Spanish Beneficent Society periodically hosted bullfights in acreage usually reserved for "football patches", although a handful of Cerro de Pasco Mining Company superintendents denounced this "blood sport." Carpenter noted that, in addition to eight extant Peruvian newspapers, the U.S. colony generated its own print cultures, particularly with the flagship Inca Chronicle, edited by an auditor for the Cerro de Pasco Mining Company, A.E. Swanson.

Carpenter's guide for narrating the indigenous Andean labor community, the mines, social imperialism, and American imperialism itself was "J.T. Glidden", then the "assistant superintendent of the Cerro de Pasco mines." Glidden secured equestrian transportation for himself and the peripatetic author. The life and career of John Tinker Glidden exemplified the multivalent consequences of what the present-day PMEI describes as "relations between the [indigenous] community and the U.S. managers and employees." During Carpenter's visit, Glidden wed, in the Church of St. Michael the Archangel overlooking Chaupimarca Square, "a Peruvian lady (whose name was Angélica) and had two daughters. The first was named after Yolanda of Vianden-Beryl and the second after Olga of Kiev-Saint Vibiana. The latter was born in September, the month of the Vibiana liturgical feast in the Calendar of saints. Glidden met his wife in 1912, when he collaborated with Ayarza gamonles in drilling a sublevel Cerro de Pasco mine, which he christened Roosevelt. Glidden, a graduate of M.I.T. (1905), had formerly served as U.S. Geological Surveyor for Oregon land fraud scandal acreage confiscated by the Roosevelt Administration and Charles Doolittle Walcott. Amidst autumn financial negotiations during the Panic of 1907, Theodore Roosevelt reclassified the Cerro de Pasco Mining Company as a subsidiary of a "good trust." One week after celebrating the 1908 New Year, Glidden accepted an employment offer from the subsidiary company and relocated to the Ayarza base of operations in Cerro de Pasco.

Women such as John Tinker Glidden's wife considered, and accepted, mestizaje as an indigenous pathway to the " 'gradual appropriation of modernity.' " Liaisons (licit and illicit à la façon du pays) reinforced and complicated the role of la familia and clans in the "profound process" of assimilation-as-Andean-indigeneity, presaging patterns of kinship embedded in Peruvian élite formulations of ethno-racial (Quechuan) indigenismo. For Glidden's wife, cousin to his mining partner, Manuel Ayarza, Callao baptismal records (birth records missing) asserted her intersectional empowerment as an ecclesiastical "hija legítima", that is, Angélica had not been born out of wedlock to Sara Ayarza and her husband, José Noriega. In 1905, Noriega's widow (viuda) had entered blanco for her husband's parentage (Noriega y Perla) on the posthumous death certificate (birth records not yet found), based on his own military records, testimonials, and statements. Sixteen years later, after a lengthy investigation, the Peruvian Ministry of War determined that Noriega, Angélica's deceased father, had falsified parts of his combat record and ethno-racial blanco identification documents. Despite the results of the government inquiry, la familia Noriega still claimed the decedent, his hereditary "hija legítima", and his posterity as their own.

=== Enganche ===
The Ayarzas, with substantial investments in the Cerro de Pasco Mining Company and superintendent John Tinker Glidden's mines, were also proprietors of Hacienda Herrería and Hacienda Santo Domingo. The institutionalization of labor practices for the U.S. "colony" in Cerro de Pasco was met with ambivalence by such proprietorial gamonles. The fin-de-siècle hacienda indigenous captive labor economy from the War of the Pacific interlocked and even coalesced with the adopted U.S. debt bondage system known as enganche ("hooking" or, more commonly, "recruiting" labor). Enganche has been critically examined by present-day scholars such as Frederico Helfgott. According to their studies, labor shortages in Cerro de Pasco synergized an already-violent dynamics of natural capital, ethnic, racial, sexual and gender power. Helfgott, for instance, avers that "enganche is generally understood as a form of labor recruitment in which agents (known as enganchadores) advanced cash loans to peasants, which they then had to repay by working in the mines, [hacienda] plantations or other sites. The system was based on people's need for cash (which could also be encouraged by the enganchadores) and on their inability to repay in any form other than their labor."

As foreman, assistant superintendent, and then superintendent to the Cerro de Pasco Mining Company (renamed the Cerro de Pasco Copper Corporation in 1915), John Tinker Glidden authored academic articles that corroborated the prevailing historiography on superintendent publications, policies, and practices. Historical anthropologists such as Frederico Helfgott critically evaluated similar writings for case studies on indigenous villages and understudied mines. Glidden, for example, published on the causes of alleged indigenous Andean ignorance to the dangers of mining---"para el indígena peruano no existo el peligro; las precauciones más elementales le son descondidas"---and their purported lack of hygiene. For both, Glidden blamed the "refractory nature" of the labor force: "la causa principal y talvez única de este mal, es la naturaleza refractaria del indígena al aseo general." It was his carga to spearhead a campaign for night schools in Cerro de Pasco, "el sistema educativo" dedicated to U.S. parameters for cleanliness and safety. Glidden further deemed the Cerro de Pasco Mining Company's indigenous labor camps, replete with drinking water, electric lights, and stoves, as "gran progreso" (great progress). But he called for health care subsidies and more U.S. nurses to combat the high infant mortality rates, as well as indigenous delivery practices, in these quarters. Despite growing indigenous demands for "libertad individual", the superintendent hoped that parents would learn U.S. hygienic practices and health care by example, thereby evincing the purported "humanitarias intenciones" of his "Compañía Americana."

During World War I, superintendent John Tinker Glidden took a leave of absence to complete the United States Railroad Administration exams. Glidden proposed, and supervised, the construction of a railroad beginning in the west-central Andes, at the Department of Ancash. This venture, in turn, facilitated Peru Bureau of Public Works approval of yet another Glidden proposal: paving, administering, and inaugurating a public cart road between Callao and Lima, further coalescing a Lima metropolitan area. His supervisorial duties for both "infrastructural" projects undermined his efforts to sustain a superintendence at Cerro de Pasco, although he periodically still published on the U.S. "colony". Glidden subsequently became an independent contractor for superintendent roles among multiple mining companies in the Andes, from the Guggenheim family's ASARCO, in the Alis District of the Yauyos Province, to the J.P. Morgan & Co.-backed Anglo American plc in the Lucanas Province. In the early 1920s, he maintained start-up offices at the Peruvian capital's Hipódromo de Santa Beatriz, a jockey club and equine racetrack near El Campo de Marte. Then he moved the offices to the Miraflores District, Lima---his headquarters until his death. After 1927, Glidden also established a branch office in La Paz, Bolivia, where he relocated his wife for nine years and, for three years, his youngest daughter. His cherished Andean railroad collapsed during the 1970 Ancash earthquake.

Glidden continued to assist in mining and labor "recruitment" at Cerro de Pasco, one stop in an international circuit that crisscrossed the Andes. "The 'cheap' labor," he told one journal editor in 1922, had proven "inefficient and therefore not cheap. On the other hand, none but natives can stand the 'pressure' of the work in the high altitudes at which the most important mines are located."

=== Years of turbulence, unionization, and mining education to 1945 ===
After the 1920 Constitution attempted to address indigenous labor, Lima metropolitan élites began to criticize enganche and the Cerro de Pasco Mining Company itself, situating the rebirth of a nationalized economy within ethno-racial and cultural remembrances of Andean indigeneity. Their publications contributed to the 1923-24 rise of the American Popular Revolutionary Alliance, a militant labor party aiming to, among a multitude of goals, reform enganche and labor abuses. Both the élites and APRA claimed the mantle of indigenismo. Between 1929 and 1932, the Cerro de Pasco Mining Company laid off two-thirds of its indigenous labor force, a consequence of the worldwide Great Depression. Instead of reformation, the superintendents abruptly severed thousands of indigenous workers from the cash economy, stirring labor unrest and galvanizing the APRA.

APRA recruits in Cerro de Pasco threatened to plunge the U.S. "colony" into bloodshed. As religious studies scholar Annette Pelletier attested, the U.S. Immaculate Heart of Mary's Colegio Villa María had previously become the de facto secondary educational institution for mestiza daughters of the "colony"---despite, or because of, curricular and pedagogical emphasis on Catholic social teaching. According to Pelletier, in 1930, when superintendent John Tinker Glidden's youngest daughter completed her First Communion at Colegio Villa María in the Miraflores District of Lima, the principal Catholic "Servant Sister" instructor recorded that " 'the Americans in Cerro de Pasco are in great trouble, all women have had to come to Lima for safety and some of their husbands are in danger of being killed. We know this because we have some of the children in school.' " The same religious sister later reported that there was " 'no hot water in Villa Maria; it had to be heated on a kerosene heater—same for cooking. Gas was finally connected for cooking, heating water. Cold and hot water bottles! Bundle up in shawls, sweaters in bed.' " The sisters attempted to adapt to "political realities" by inviting leaders and recruits of military juntas, such as Luis Miguel Sánchez Cerro and Óscar R. Benavides, to deliver keynote addresses at graduation ceremonies. For example, one sister recalled that, " 'when Sánchez Cerro came after the deposition of Leguía...Everybody of the male sex in the audience was carrying a gun.' " She chose to redact her observations on the reactions of female students.

== Geography ==
=== Climate ===
At 4,330 metres (14,210 ft) above sea level, Cerro de Pasco has an alpine tundra climate (Köppen ET) with the average temperature of the warmest month below the 10 °C (50 °F) threshold that would allow for tree growth, giving the countryside its barren appearance. The city is the largest in the world with this classification. Cerro de Pasco has humid, damp and cloudy summers with frequent rainfall and dry, sunny winters with cool to cold temperatures throughout the year. Snowfall occurs sporadically during any season, most commonly around dawn.

The average annual temperature in Cerro de Pasco is 5.5 °C (41.9 °F) and the average annual rainfall is 916 millimetres (36 in).

Climate data for Cerro de Pasco, elevation 4,357 m (14,295 ft), (1991–2020)
Month	Jan	Feb	Mar	Apr	May	Jun	Jul	Aug	Sep	Oct	Nov	Dec	Year
Mean daily maximum °C (°F)	10.6 (51.1)	10.4 (50.7)	10.2 (50.4)	10.7 (51.3)	11.3 (52.3)	10.9 (51.6)	10.9 (51.6)	11.4 (52.5)	11.1 (52.0)	11.2 (52.2)	11.5 (52.7)	10.6 (51.1)	10.9 (51.6)
Mean daily minimum °C (°F)	1.6 (34.9)	2.0 (35.6)	1.9 (35.4)	1.1 (34.0)	0.0 (32.0)	−1.3 (29.7)	−2.3 (27.9)	−2.0 (28.4)	−0.6 (30.9)	0.4 (32.7)	0.8 (33.4)	1.5 (34.7)	0.3 (32.5)
Average precipitation mm (inches)	112.0 (4.41)	117.2 (4.61)	106.2 (4.18)	57.1 (2.25)	27.9 (1.10)	11.6 (0.46)	12.4 (0.49)	12.6 (0.50)	36.0 (1.42)	71.9 (2.83)	74.0 (2.91)	92.6 (3.65)	731.5 (28.81)
Source: National Meteorology and Hydrology Service of Peru

== Places of Interest ==
The local football field, Daniel Alcides Carrión Stadium, is one of the highest altitude sports stadiums in the world.

== Notable people ==
- Daniel Alcides Carrión

== See also ==
- Yanacocha
- Toquepala mine

== Sources ==
- Briceño, Mario (2017). The Transformation of Cerro de Pasco: The Greatest Investment of the XXth Century (PDF).
- Helfgott, Federico M. (2013). Transformations in Labor, Land and Community: Mining and Society in Pasco, Peru, 20th Century to the Present (Thesis). hdl:2027.42/99793.
