= Muqu Wasi =

Mountain in Peru

- Location within Peru

Highest point
- Elevation: 4,000 m (13,000 ft)
- Coordinates: 13°33′16″S 74°28′21″W

Geography
- Location: Peru, Ayacucho Region, Cangallo Province
- Parent range: Andes

Muqu Wasi (Quechua muqu hill, wasi house, "hill house", Hispanicized spelling Mojo Huasi) is a mountain in the Andes of Peru, about 4,000 metres (13,123 ft) high. It is situated in the Ayacucho Region, Cangallo Province, Totos District, northeast of Totos. Muqu Wasi lies west of Kiswara, east of Huch'uy Puka Q'asa and southeast of Chawpi Urqu.
