= María Parado de Bellido =

Peruvian independence revolutionary

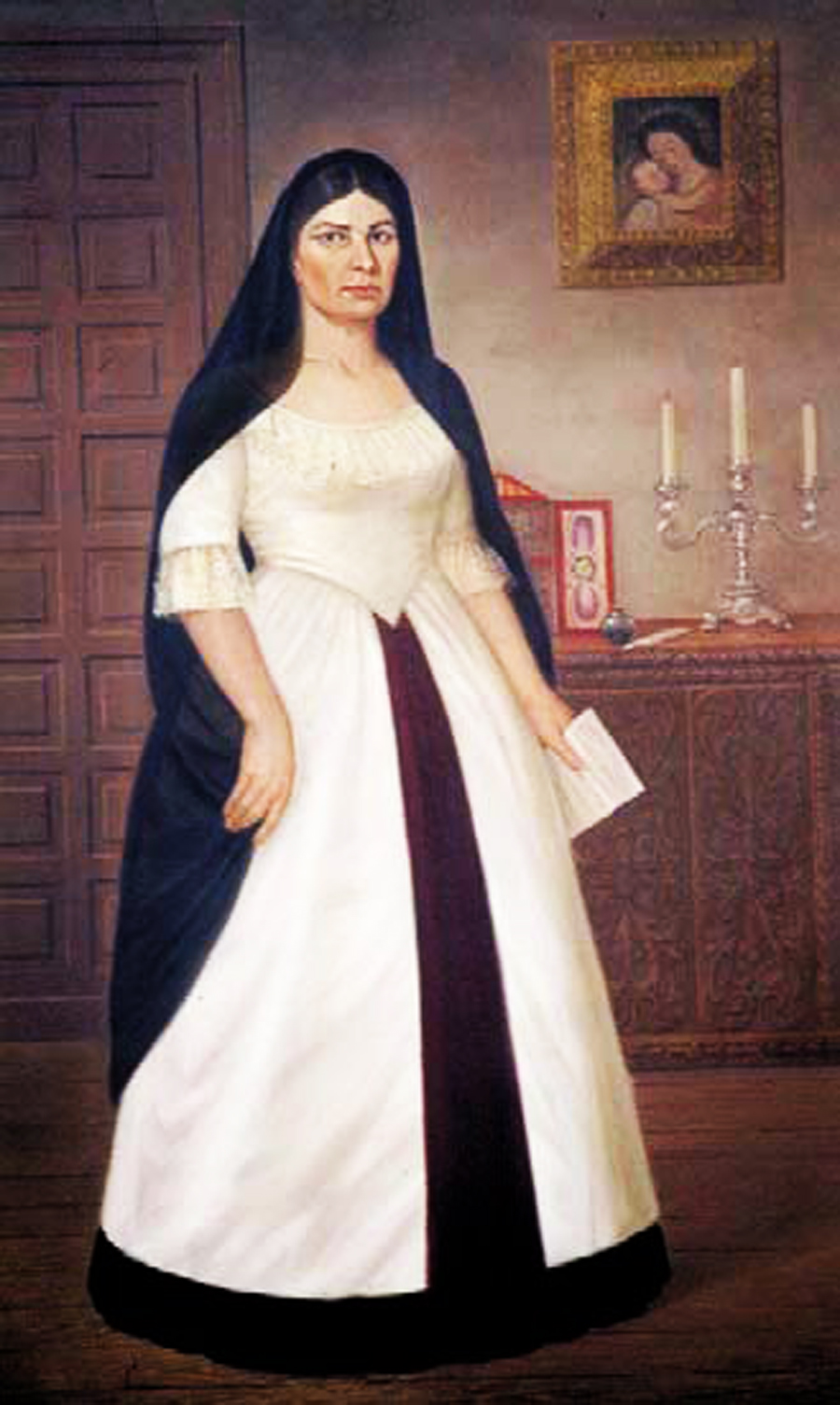
Painting of Maria Prado de Bellido, Artist unknown

María Parado de Bellido (5 July 1777 – 11 May 1822) was an indigenous Peruvian revolutionary during the struggle for independence from Spain.

== Life ==
She was born in Ayacucho, in the province of Huamanga. She married Mariano Bellido when she was 15 years old. Her husband and one of her sons were fighting for independence, and she passed on information about Spanish troop movements, dictating and signing her letters as she was illiterate. After one of her letters was intercepted by the Spanish she was captured and interrogated, but said she would rather die than betray her country: "no estoy aquí para informar a ustedes, sino para sacrificarme por la causa de la libertad". She was shot by the Spanish on 11 May 1822.

=== Birth and early years ===
Various historians agree that María Parado de Bellido was born in Huamanga, then called Ayacucho, in the southern highlands of Peru. However, the priest Carlos Cárdenas claimed to have discovered her baptismal certificate in the parish of Cangallo, where she would have been born, to be more exact, in the current district of Paras. There is also no consensus as to the year of her birth. Some sources place it in the year 1777 and others in 1761, but they all agree on the same date: 5 July.

Her parents were Fernando Parado, a Creole of Upper Peruvian descent, and Jacinta Jayo, an indigenous woman.

Her childhood was like that of all the girls of her time, who did not receive instructions and only prepared for marital tasks.

=== Marriage and children ===
She married, at the age of 15, with Mariano Bellido, a business man who around 1820 worked in the postal section of the Paras District in the Cangallo Province, where the family had their residence, although they temporarily resided in Huamanga. They had seven children: Gregoria, Andrea, Mariano, Tomás, María, Leandra and Bartola. Both her husband and their sons collaborated from 1820 with the patriotic forces.

Her son Tomás joined the patriotic ranks of General Juan Antonio Álvarez de Arenales when it passed through Huamanga in 1820, and then he joined the montoneros patriots led by Quiroz Lazón, who were active in Cangallo. Her husband and her other son, Mariano, also began to collaborate with those montoneros who acted in coordination with the regular forces of General José de San Martín.

She is considered a Peruvian heroine, and oral tradition has created several myths about her. It is said that General Carratala, in an attempt to persuade her to talk, ordered soldiers to burn down her home where her daughters lived, but that they were saved because local people warned them to escape; that she paused outside the church of Santo Domingo, on the way to her execution, to kneel and pray to the Virgin mary; and that after her execution a priest claimed her body and buried it in consecrated ground at the church of La Merced. It has been said that "Bellido has become a figure of near mythical proportions deeply interwoven with the Peruvian sense of nationhood".

=== Efforts for the liberation cause ===
The City of the Kings occupied by the Liberation Army commanded by General José de San Martín and proclaimed the independence of Peru in the Plaza Mayor of Lima in 1821. The royalists, under the command of Viceroy José de la Serna, retreated to the mountains, while most of the cities from the coast joined the realistic defense. Obedience to it was also growing in the central highlands, represented by the guerrillas leading the indigenous people and mestizos loyal to the king.

La Serna was established in Cusco, in the southern highlands, which became a Stronghold of the royalists, whose forces were mostly made up of Indians who were forcibly recruited from Cusco. La Serna sent its forces to the central highlands, to subdue the "insurgents", as they called the patriots. These forces of repression were commanded by General José Carratalá, and Colonel Juan Loriga. Carratalá was in charge of the repression in the Parinacochas Province, Lucanas and Huamanga. He carried out his goals ruthlessly. Whole villages were burned and devastated, and its inhabitants massacred. One of those towns was Cangallo.

Carratalá established his headquarters in the city of Huamanga. One of its objectives was to link up with the royalist forces fighting the patriotic forces in Ica (central coast), but after the defeat of these forces in the battle of La Macacona (near Ica), he remained in Huamanga and concentrated all his efforts on exterminating the Quirós guerrillas, in which the husband and children of María Parado de Bellido were active.

=== Patriotic Activities ===
Surely it was the example of the husband and her children that prompted María Andrea to also work for the liberating cause, from the city of Huamanga. As she did not know how to write, she dictated to a trusted friend named Matías Madrid, the letters that she sent to her husband in order to inform them of the movements and the enemy's plans. Information that Mariano immediately communicated to the patriot Quirós. Thanks to one of those letters, the patriotic guerrillas were able to leave the town of Quilcamachay, on 29 March 1822. The next day the town was occupied by the royalists, and there one of Maria’s letters was found, carelessly forgotten in a guerrilla's jacket.

This was the text of said letter:

Huamanga, 26 May 1822

Dear Mariano:

Tomorrow the force marches from this city to take the one that exists there and other people, who defend the cause of freedom. Inform the Chief of that force, Mr. Quirós, and try to flee immediately to Huancavelica, where our cousins the Negretes is; because if a misfortune should happen to you (God forbid) it would be a pain for your family, and especially for your wife.

Andrea.

=== Capture ===
Although the discovered letter was only signed with the heroine's middle name, the royalists soon identified who the sender was. Maria was arrested on 30 March in Huamanga. Carratalá did not even hesitate to torture her. But she completely refused to give names and repeatedly gave the same answer: "I wrote it!”. Finally, Carratalá ordered her execution.

=== Martyrdom ===
Guarded by forces of the royal garrison, María was carried in a procession around the Huamanguina square. On each corner an officer read the side of the sentence handed down by Carratalá, justifying his action "as an example for anybody else trying to rebel against the king and lord of Peru". Then she was taken to the pampas or Plazuela del Arco where the firing squad awaited her. After being admonished for the last time, to reveal the secrets of the movement, which was promised for her life. She rejected the proposal without hesitation and resigned to suffering the last torture. She knelt waited for death with her gaze directed to heaven. At the time of martyrdom, she was over 60 years old.

It is said that her corpse was buried for alms by the Mercedarian friars in their temple, a few blocks from the place of execution, while her daughters were left to their fate and they found refuge in a church. Then several confusing versions about her family emerged. The only verifiable thing is what Simón Bolívar established a grace pension for the surviving daughters of heroin. The fate of her husband and her children who participated in the montoneras is not known.

She is commemorated in the name of María Parado de Bellido District in Callao Province of Peru. The painting Fusilamiento de María Parado de Bellido (The Shooting of ...) by Consuelo Cisnero (1929) is held in the National Museum of the Archaeology. In 1975 a Peruvian postage stamp bore her portrait as part of a set of stamps for "Year of Peruvian Women".

=== Portraits ===
Despite the lack of biographical data, Maria’s fame has spread beyond her native land. An example is the famous American writer Carleton Beals who wrote about her in his book Fire on the Andes.

For his part, the journalist Aurelio Miró Quesada, on a visit he made to the heroine's house in Ayacucho, also praised her in his book Costa, sierra y Montaña.

She died at the age of 44, she was a Peruvian heroine and a martyr for the independence of Peru. She said before she died that her execution be ordered. María Parado de Bellido flatly refused to give names, she was subjected to intense interrogation to expose the names of committed patriots.

Peruvian heroine from the time of independence. Mariano Bellido and her sons acted as couriers for the patriot army in the Huamanga region. Her main mission was to report on the movements of the royalist troops.

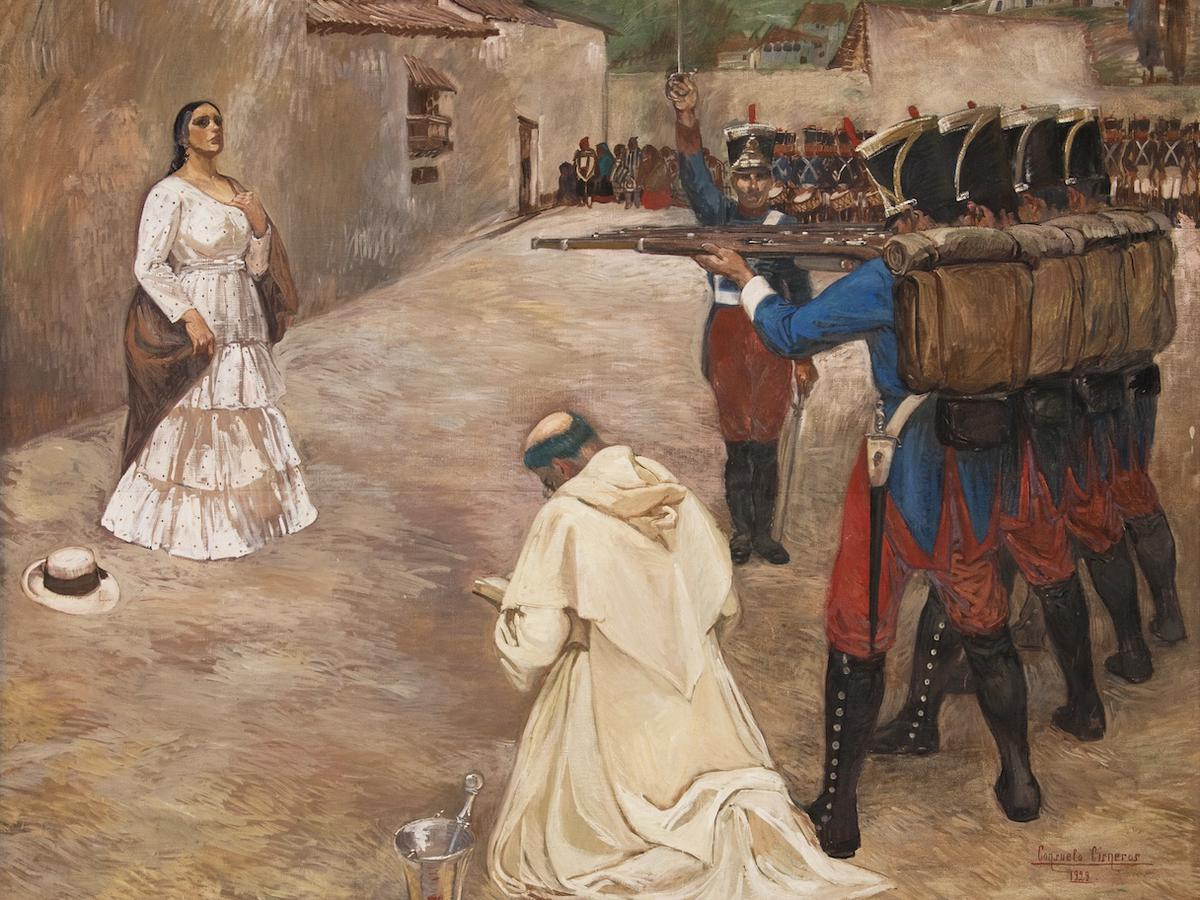
Fusilamiento de Maria Parado de Bellido ("The shooting of ...) by Consuelo Cisneros, 1929
