= Pirhuaylla =

Peruvian mountain

- Location within Peru

Highest point
- Elevation: 4,158 m (13,642 ft)
- Coordinates: 13°33′33″S 74°35′29″W

Geography
- Location: Peru, Ayacucho Region, Cangallo Province
- Parent range: Andes

Pirhuaylla is a 4,158-metre-high (13,642 ft) mountain in the Andes of Peru. It is situated in the Ayacucho Region, Cangallo Province, Paras District, southeast of Paras. The Pampas River flows along its southern slopes. It harbors an archaeological site.
