= Kiswara =

Mountain in Peru

- Location within Peru

Highest point
- Elevation: 4,400 m (14,400 ft)
- Coordinates: 13°33′09″S 74°27′21″W

Geography
- Location: Peru, Ayacucho Region, Cangallo Province
- Parent range: Andes

Kiswara (Aymara for Buddleja incana, hispanicized spelling Quisuara) is a mountain in the Andes of Peru, about 4,400 metres (14,436 ft) high. It is situated in the Ayacucho Region, Cangallo Province, Totos District. Kiswara lies east of Huch'uy Puka Q'asa and Muqu Wasi, and southeast of Chawpi Urqu.
