= Saywa Q'asa =

Mountain in Peru

- Location within Peru

Highest point
- Elevation: 5,000 m (16,000 ft)
- Coordinates: 13°25′5″S 74°39′34″W

Geography
- Location: Peru, Ayacucho Region, Cangallo Province
- Parent range: Andes

Saywa Q'asa (Quechua saywa boundary stone, landmark, q'asa mountain pass, "landmark mountain pass", Hispanicized spelling Sayhuaccasa) is a mountain in the Andes of Peru, about 5,000 metres (16,404 ft) high. It is situated in the Ayacucho Region, Cangallo Province, in the north of the Paras District. Saywa Q'asa lies south-west of the mountain Chiqllarasu, west of the mountain Saywa (Sayhua), north-east of the mountain Waranwallqa and east of the mountain Rit'ipata.

The Pampawasi River (Pampahuasi) originates near Saywa Q'asa. It flows to the south where its waters reach Pampas River near the town of Paras.
