= Atuq Wachana =

Atuq Wachana (Quechua for "where the fox is born', also spelled Atoj Huachana, Atocchuachana, erroneously also spelled Atcchuachana) or Atuq Wachanan (-n a suffix, also spelled Atoc-Huachanan) may refer to:

- Atuq Wachana (Arce-Punata), a mountain on the border of the Arce Province and the Punata Province, Cochabamba Department, Bolivia
- Atuq Wachana (Ayacucho), a mountain in the Ayacucho Region, Peru
- Atuq Wachana (Quillacollo), a mountain in the Quillacollo Province, Cochabamba Department, Bolivia
- Atuq Wachanan, a mountain in the Huánuco Region, Peru
