= Cangallo =

- Town
- Location within Peru
- Coordinates: 13°37′43.17″S 74°08′38.75″W
- Country: Peru
- Region: Ayacucho
- Province: Cangallo
- District: Cangallo

Government
  - Mayor: Percy Colos Ayala
- Elevation: 2,577 m (8,455 ft)
- Time zone: UTC-5 (PET)

Cangallo is a town in southern Peru, capital of the province Cangallo in the region Ayacucho.

In the region of Cangallo live the Morochuco mestizos.

== Fight for independence at Cangallo 1814–1822 ==
As a consequence of the discrimination of natives and mestizos in Perú, there were many executions of Peruvian indigenous leaders by the Spanish colonial authorities, the viceroyalty. In the course of the many rebellions and independence movements, the Morochuco population of the Cangallo region declared independence from colonial Spain in 1814. The Morochuco farmers then fought several battles in the region of Cangallo, among others at Matará, Rucumachay, Atunguana and Atuntoqto. The resistance against colonial troops went on until 1821.

One of the Morochuco leaders became Basilio Auqui. He prepared a mud field in the plain of Seqchapampa so the Spanish cavalry would die in the mud trap which was successful on 21 November 1821 when Spanish cavalry was sent and a flight movement was simulated. As revenge for the defeat of the best colonial Spanish cavalry in the mud the Spanish intendant José Domingo Carratalá led the Cangallo attack by Spanish troops on 17 December 1821. Cangallo was razed and Spanish troops massacred the population shooting elder men, women and children.

After more attacks by Basilio Auqui's units, the resistance movement under Auqui came to an end by betrayal in 1822, when the Spanish intendant Carratalá set out a head money on Auqui. The traitor Quinto got the money, Auqui was captured, brought to Ayacucho and executed by shooting on the Plaza de Santa Teresa in Ayacucho. There is a monument of the hero of Cangallo Morochuco resistance at the place he was shot.

== Sources ==
- Prof. Juan Perlacios Campos: Historia; Centro Preuniversitario de la Universidad Nacional de San Cristóbal de Huamanga; Ayacucho, Perú
