= Los Morochucos District =

Coordinates: 13.5568°S 74.1955°W

Los Morochucos Muru Chuku
- District
- Interactive map of Los Morochucos
- Country: Peru
- Region: Ayacucho
- Province: Cangallo
- Founded: April 12, 1957
- Capital: Pampa Cangallo

Government
  - Mayor: Sergio Dipaz Cisneros

Area
  - Total: 262.59 km^{2} (101.39 sq mi)
- Elevation: 3,330 m (10,930 ft)

Population (2005 census)
  - Total: 8,016
  - Density: 30.53/km^{2} (79.06/sq mi)
- Time zone: UTC-5 (PET)
- UBIGEO: 050203

Los Morochucos (from Quechua Muru Chuku) is one of six districts of the Cangallo Province in Peru.

== Geography ==
One of the highest peaks of the district is Usnu at approximately 4,200 m (13,800 ft). Other mountains are listed below:

- Chuntalla
- Marayniyuq
- Parya Wanka
- Tuqtucha Urqu
- Uchku Mach'ay Urqu

== Ethnic groups ==
The people in the district are mainly indigenous citizens of Quechua descent. Quechua is the language which the majority of the population (93.40%) learnt to speak in childhood, 6.34% of the residents started speaking using the Spanish language (2007 Peru Census).
