= Chuschi District =

Coordinates: 13.5843°S 74.3521°W

Chuschi
- District
- Interactive map of Chuschi
- Country: Peru
- Region: Ayacucho
- Province: Cangallo
- Founded: January 2, 1857
- Capital: Chuschi

Government
  - Mayor: Timoteo Cayllahua Allcca

Area
  - Total: 431.96 km^{2} (166.78 sq mi)
- Elevation: 3,141 m (10,305 ft)

Population (2005 census)
  - Total: 8,917
  - Density: 20.64/km^{2} (53.47/sq mi)
- Time zone: UTC-5 (PET)
- UBIGEO: 050202

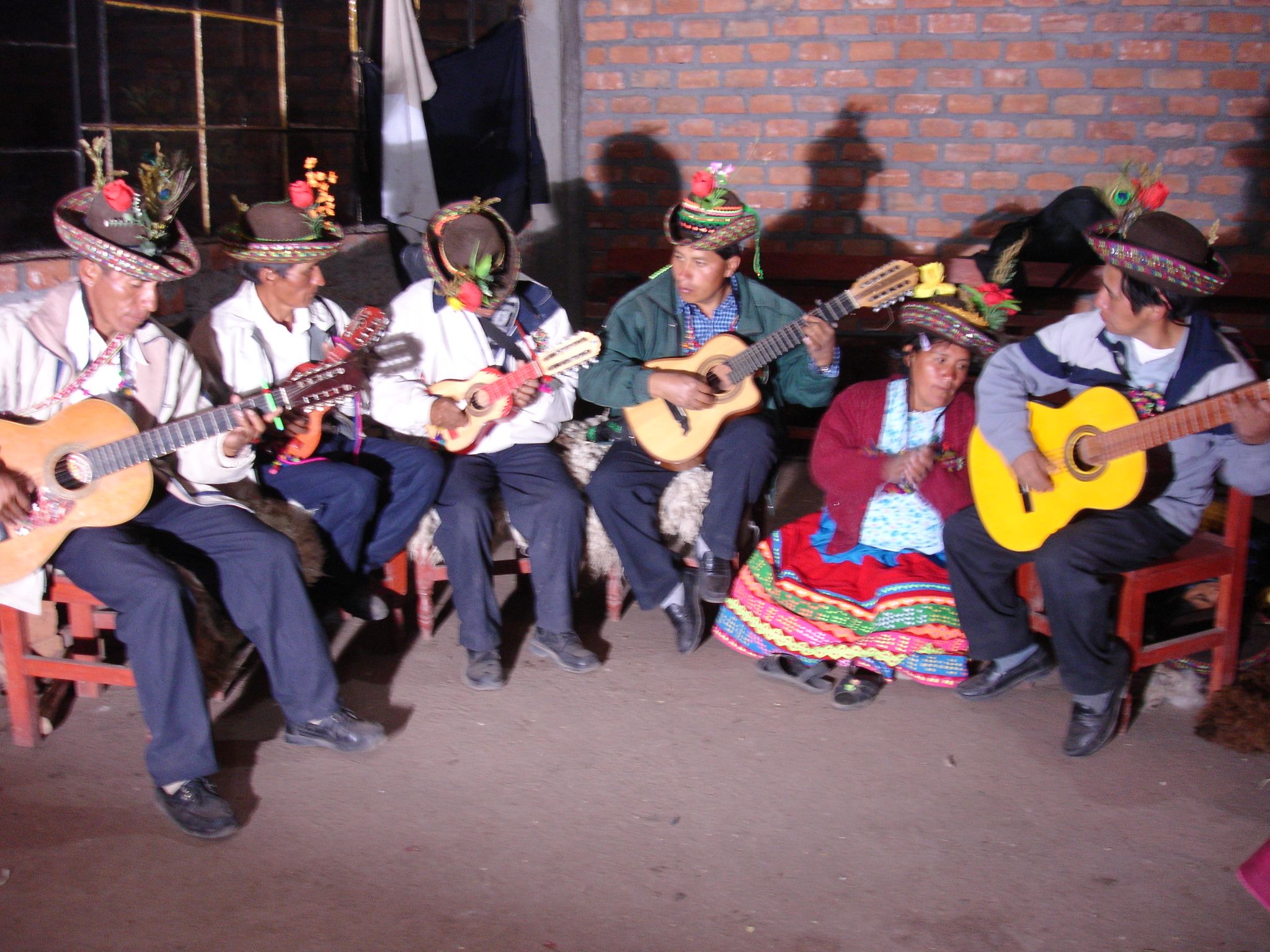

Chuschi District is one of six districts of the Cangallo Province in Peru. It is known for being the site of the first attack perpetrated by the maoist terrorist organization Shining Path, initiating the Peruvian conflict.

== Geography ==
One of the highest peaks of the district is Saywa at approximately 4,800 m (15,700 ft). Other mountains are listed below:

- Anta Sirk'a
- Aqchi Mach'ay
- Chaku
- Hatun Pata
- Kuntur Q'asa
- Misa Qucha
- Puka Mach'ay
- Puka Qucha
- Puma Wasi
- Phutunqu
- P'ukru
- Qiruchayuq
- Qullpa Pata
- Q'illu Wayta
- Ruphasqa
- Tampuchayuq
- Usnu
- Wamansa
- Waychaw Pata
- Wayra Punku
- Yana Mach'ay
- Yana Phiruru
- Yana Qaqa

== Ethnic groups ==
The people in the district are mainly indigenous citizens of Quechua descent. Quechua is the language which the majority of the population (97.92%) learnt to speak in childhood, 1.94% of the residents started speaking using the Spanish language (2007 Peru Census).

== See also ==
- Yanaqucha
