= Chiqllarasu =

- Location within Peru

Highest point
- Elevation: 5,167 m (16,952 ft)
- Coordinates: 13°22′32.9″S 74°38′18.3″W

Geography
- Location: Peru, Ayacucho Region
- Parent range: Andes

Chiqllarasu (Quechua, chiqlla green, Ancash Quechua rasu snow, ice, mountain with snow, Hispanicized spelling Chicllarazo) Portugueza or Portuguesa is a mountain in the Andes of Peru, about 5,167 metres (16,952 ft) high. It is situated in the Ayacucho Region, Cangallo Province, Paras District. Chiqllarasu lies north-east of the mountain Saywa Q'asa, between the villages Patawasi (Patahuasi) in the northwest and Kichkawasi (Quichcahuasi) in the southeast.

Chiqllarasu lies on the top of the crest of the Western Cordillera.(Noble & McKee 1982, p. 1893) It features a 7 by 4 kilometres (4.3 mi × 2.5 mi) wide caldera,(Guillou-Frottier, Burov & Milési 2000, p. 342) known as the Cerro Sagollan caldera.(Wise & Noble 2008, p. 80) Within the 800 metres (2,600 ft) thick deposits gold and silver have been found.(Guillou-Frottier, Burov & Milési 2000, p. 342) These are epithermal deposits with low sulfide content.(Guillou-Frottier, Burov & Milési 2000, p. 352) The caldera was formed on a central volcano which erupted andesite and dacite.(Sillitoe & Bonham 1984, p. 1292) This edifice originally reached a diameter of 30 kilometres (19 mi) or more(Noble & McKee 1982, p. 1894), and contained lava domes and short lava flows, which are most recognizable on the eastern side of the volcano (Noble & McKee 1982, p. 1895). The Rio Apacheta and the Rio Quichcahuasi drain the edifice (Noble & McKee 1982, p. 1896).

The Atunsulla tuff is formed by many flows of rhyolite which contain clasts and pumice. It advanced as much as 40 kilometres (25 mi) along the Rio Cachi, reaching the Ayacucho basin. The river has eroded deep into the tuff,(Wise & Noble 2008, p. 80) which has been removed in many places by erosion.(Noble & McKee 1982, p. 1896). Initially its volume may have been about 50 cubic kilometres (12 cu mi) (Noble & McKee 1982, p. 1897). This volcano may be underpinned by a large batholith.(Noble & McKee 1982, p. 1893).

Samples from the pre-Atunsulla tuff volcano have been dated at 4–3.5 million years ago (Noble & McKee 1982, p. 1896). The Atunsulla tuff was erupted from Chiqllarasu around 2.4 million years ago (Guillou-Frottier, Burov & Milési 2000, p. 342). A long break in volcanic activity, during which the edifice was deeply eroded, may have occurred before this eruption(Noble & McKee 1982, p. 1895). A resurgent dome formed 1.9 million years ago. Hydrothermal activity occurred both before and after the eruption of the Atunsulla tuff, and the mineralization occurred 1.9 million years ago(Guillou-Frottier, Burov & Milési 2000, p. 342), This volcano is among the youngest in a Central Peru volcanic chain (Noble & McKee 1982, p. 1893); hot water indicate that the geothermal system may be still active (Noble & McKee 1982, p. 1897).
