= Cangallo District =

Coordinates: 13.6293°S 74.1444°W

Cangallo
- District
- Interactive map of Cangallo
- Country: Peru
- Region: Ayacucho
- Province: Cangallo
- Capital: Cangallo

Government
  - Mayor: Percy Colos Ayala

Area
  - Total: 188.58 km^{2} (72.81 sq mi)
- Elevation: 2,577 m (8,455 ft)

Population (2005 census)
  - Total: 7,045
  - Density: 37.36/km^{2} (96.76/sq mi)
- Time zone: UTC-5 (PET)
- UBIGEO: 050201

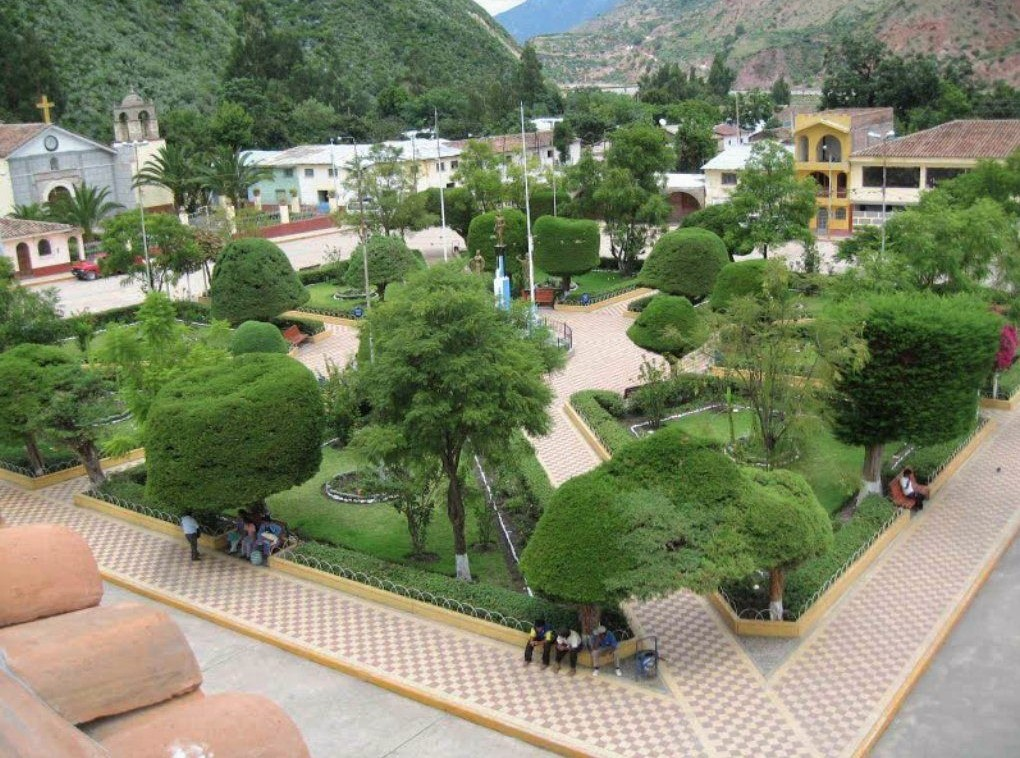
A park in the area

Cangallo District is one of six districts of the province Cangallo in Peru.

== Ethnic groups ==
The people in the district are mainly indigenous citizens of Quechua descent. Quechua is the language which the majority of the population (75.10%) learnt to speak in childhood, 24.48% of the residents started speaking using the Spanish language (2007 Peru Census).
