= Mach'ayniyuq =

Mountain in Peru

- Location within Peru

Highest point
- Elevation: 4,600 m (15,100 ft)
- Coordinates: 13°27′42″S 74°46′22″W

Geography
- Location: Peru, Ayacucho Region
- Parent range: Andes

Mach'ayniyuq (Quechua mach'ay cave, -ni, -yuq suffixes, "the one with a cave (or caves)", also spelled Machayniocc) is a mountain in the Andes of Peru high, about 4,600 m (15,092 ft). It is situated in the Ayacucho Region, Cangallo Province, Paras District. Mach'ayniyuq lies southeast of Qarampa.
