= Yanaqucha (Cangallo) =

Lake in Peru

- Location within Peru
- Location: Peru; Ayacucho Region
- Coordinates: 13°24′17″S 74°34′21″W
- Max. length: 0.75 km (0.47 mi)
- Max. width: 0.29 km (0.18 mi)
- Surface elevation: 4,409 m (14,465 ft)

Yanaqucha (Quechua yana black, very dark, qucha lake, "black lake", Hispanicized spelling Yanacocha) is a lake in Peru located in Chuschi District, Cangallo Province, Ayacucho Region. It is situated at a height of about 4,409 metres (14,465 ft), about 0.75 km long and 0.29 km at its widest point.
