= Waranwallqa =

Mountain in Peru

- Location within Peru

Highest point
- Elevation: 5,000 m (16,000 ft)
- Coordinates: 13°26′49″S 74°41′19″W

Geography
- Location: Peru, Ayacucho Region, Cangallo Province
- Parent range: Andes

Waranwallqa (Quechua wara trousers, pants / bee, wallqa collar, Hispanicized spelling Huaranhuallcca) is a mountain in the Andes of Peru, about 5,000 metres (16,404 ft) high. It is situated in the Ayacucho Region, Cangallo Province, Paras District. Waranwallqa lies south-west of the mountain Saywa Q'asa, south of the mountain Rit'ipata and north-east of a small lake named Yanaqucha (Quechua for "black lake", Hispanicized Yanacocha).
