= Yana Chaka =

Mountain in Peru

- Location within Peru

Highest point
- Elevation: 5,002 m (16,411 ft)
- Coordinates: 13°24′09″S 74°51′50″W

Geography
- Location: Peru, Ayacucho Region
- Parent range: Andes

Yana Chaka (Quechua yana black, chaka bridge, "black bridge", Hispanicized spelling Yanachacca) is a 5,002 m (16,411 ft) mountain in the Andes of Peru. It is situated in the Ayacucho Region, Cangallo Province, Paras District. Yana Chaka lies northwest of Tikti Wañusqa and east of Millpu.
