= Antapite =

Mountain in Peru

- Location within Peru

Highest point
- Elevation: 4,410 m (14,470 ft)
- Coordinates: 13°31′05″S 74°32′57″W

Geography
- Location: Ayacucho, Peru
- Parent range: Andes

Antapite (possibly from Quechua anta copper, p'iti dividing by pulling powerfully to the extremes; gap, interruption) is a 4,410-metre-high (14,469 ft) mountain in the Andes of Peru. It is located in Ayacucho Region, Cangallo Province, on the border of the districts of Paras and Totos. Antapite lies north of mount Ccerone. Mines in the Antapite region carry precious and base metals which contribute to the local and global economy.
