= María Parado de Bellido District =

Coordinates: 13.6047°S 74.2363°W

María Parado de Bellido
- District
- Interactive map of María Parado de Bellido
- Country: Peru
- Region: Ayacucho
- Province: Cangallo
- Founded: June 18, 1962
- Capital: Pomabamba

Government
  - Mayor: Delia Roca Curi

Area
  - Total: 129.13 km^{2} (49.86 sq mi)
- Elevation: 3,236 m (10,617 ft)

Population (2005 census)
  - Total: 3,047
  - Density: 23.60/km^{2} (61.11/sq mi)
- Time zone: UTC-5 (PET)
- UBIGEO: 050204

María Parado de Bellido District is one of six districts of the province Cangallo in Peru.

== Ethnic groups ==
The people in the district are mainly indigenous citizens of Quechua descent. Quechua is the language which the majority of the population (96.64%) learnt to speak in childhood, 3.32% of the residents started speaking using the Spanish language (2007 Peru Census).
