= Rit'ipata (Ayacucho) =

Mountain in Peru

Ritipata
- Location within Peru

Highest point
- Elevation: 5,000 m (16,000 ft)
- Coordinates: 13°25′45″S 74°41′30″W

Geography
- Location: Peru, Ayacucho Region, Cangallo Province
- Parent range: Andes

Ritipata (Quechua riti snow, pata elevated place / above, at the top / edge, bank (of a river), shore, also spelled Ritipata) is a mountain in the Andes of Peru, about 5,000 metres (16,404 ft) high. It is situated in the Ayacucho Region, Cangallo Province, Paras District. Ritipata lies south-west of the mountain Saywaqasa and north of the mountain Waranwallqa.
