= Morochuco =

Cowboys of the Peruvian Andes

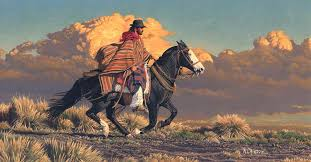
A morochuco in the Peruvian Andes

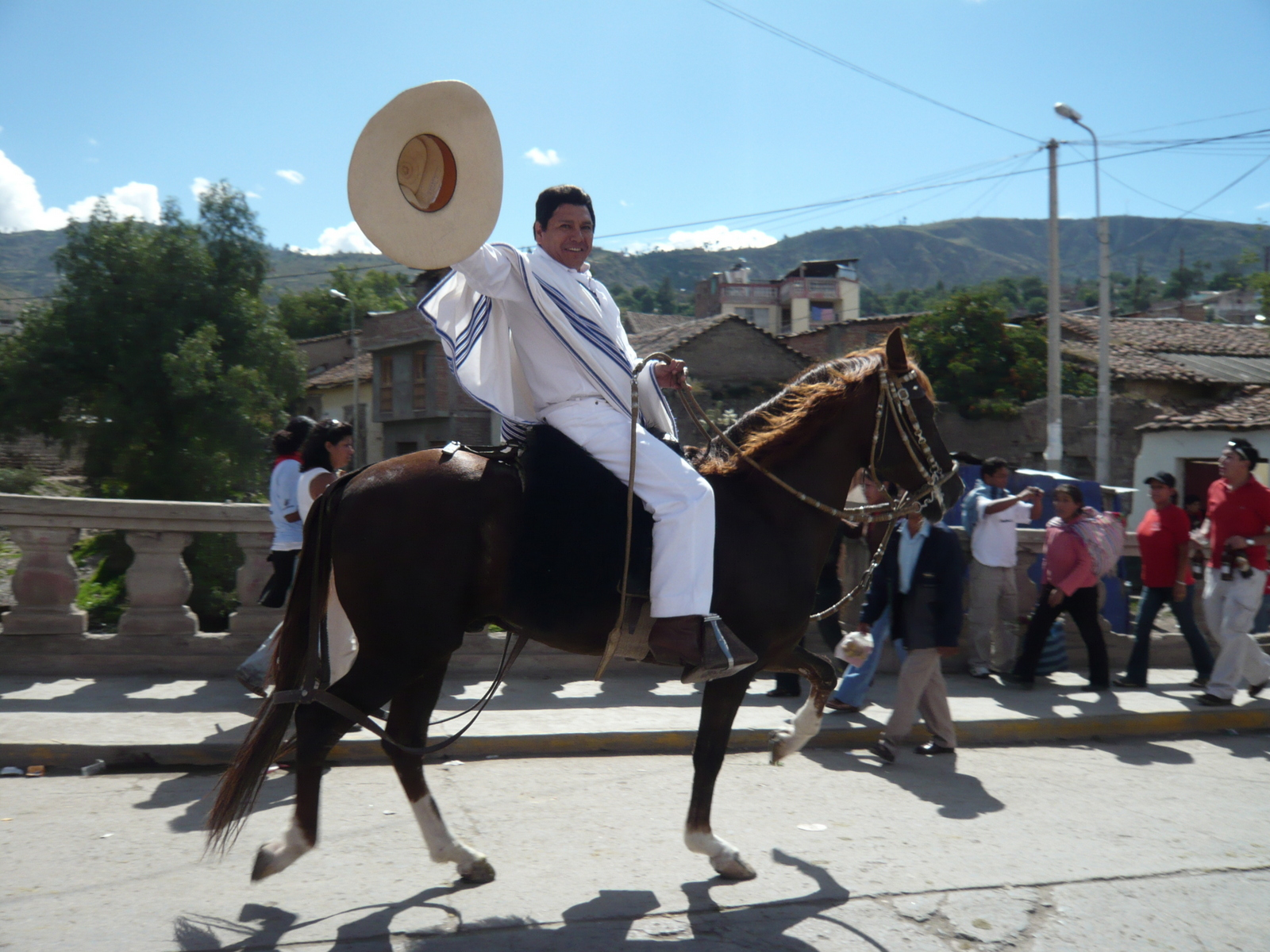
Morochuco

The Morochucos are the cowboys of the plains of the Peruvian Andes, living mainly in the Region of Ayacucho. They raise cattle and tame horses for their livelihood, and they engage in other typical activities of a cattle-horseman cowboy. They are comparable to other cowboys of Latin America such as the qorilazo, the cowboys from Cusco, also in Peru, the Chilean huaso, the Argentine/Bolivian/Uruguayan gaucho, the Spanish vaquero, the Colombian/Venezuelan llanero, and the Mexican charro.

Morochucos are known for their bravery and strength. They claim that they are descendants of the Almagristas who fought in the Battle of Chupas, and more recently, participated in the war between Peru and Chile.

Their clothing is adapted to the cold of the Andes. They wear flat-brimmed hats similar to those of the Argentine gauchos, below which they wear a chullo with the lappets tied to the face and an alpaca scarf. On the torso, they wear a black or gray vest beneath a poncho. They fit a strip or sash around their waist and wear knee high black boots with Peruvian or common spurs. They use their horses to move the cattle, surround the cattle, or tame other horses. They enjoy horse races and rodeos in their fiestas as well as bullfights. They also participate in the festivities in Ayacucho, especially during the Holy Saturday during the Holy week of Easter. They rope-pull the bulls in the streets of Huamanga, Ayacucho in a celebration called "Jala-toro" (bull-pulling) in which the bulls are released in the heavily crowded streets. While the people play with the bulls, the morochucos pull on the ropes holding the bulls before the people are hurt or charged.
