= Ayacucho =

City in Peru

Ayacucho Huamanga San Juan de la Frontera de Huamanga
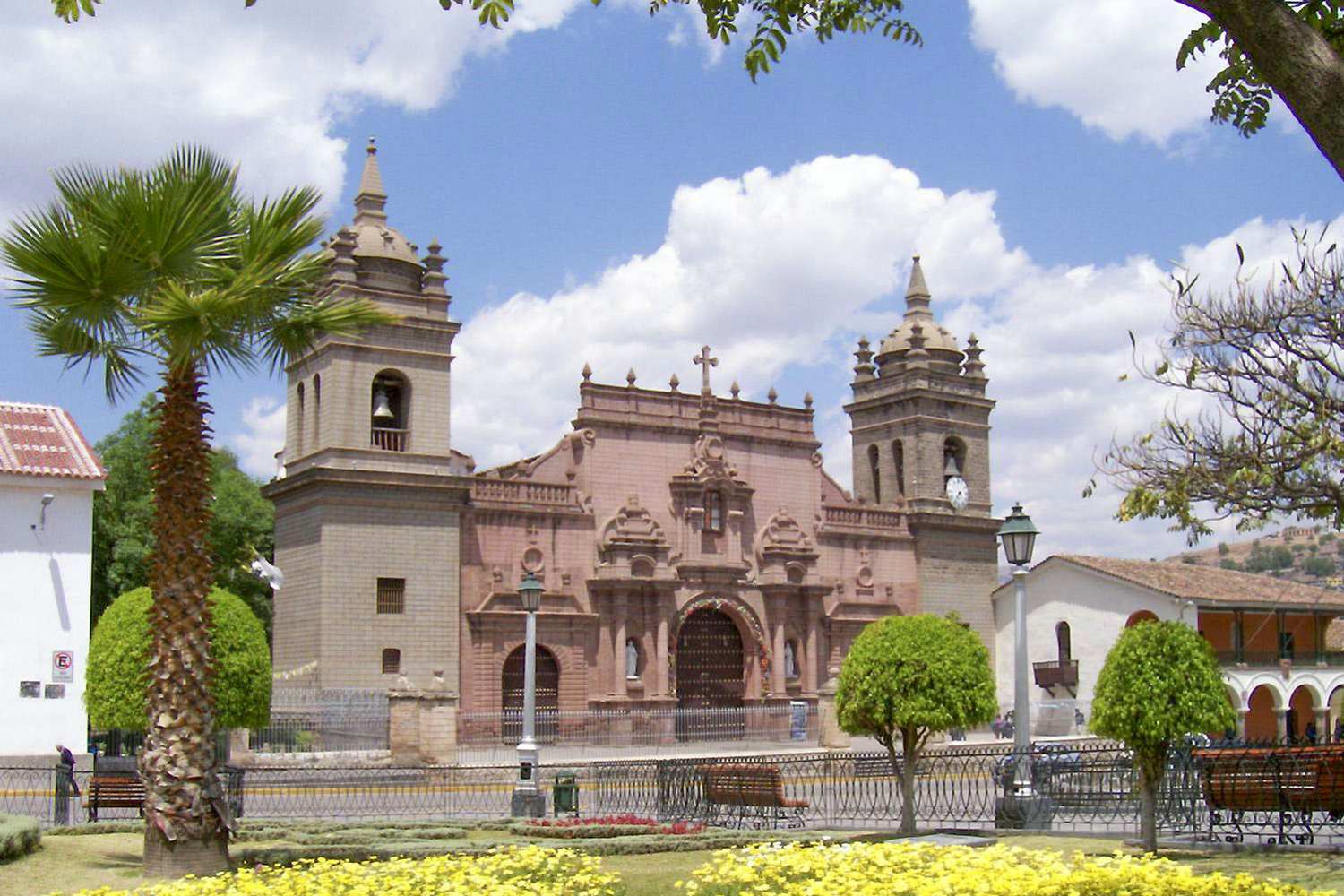
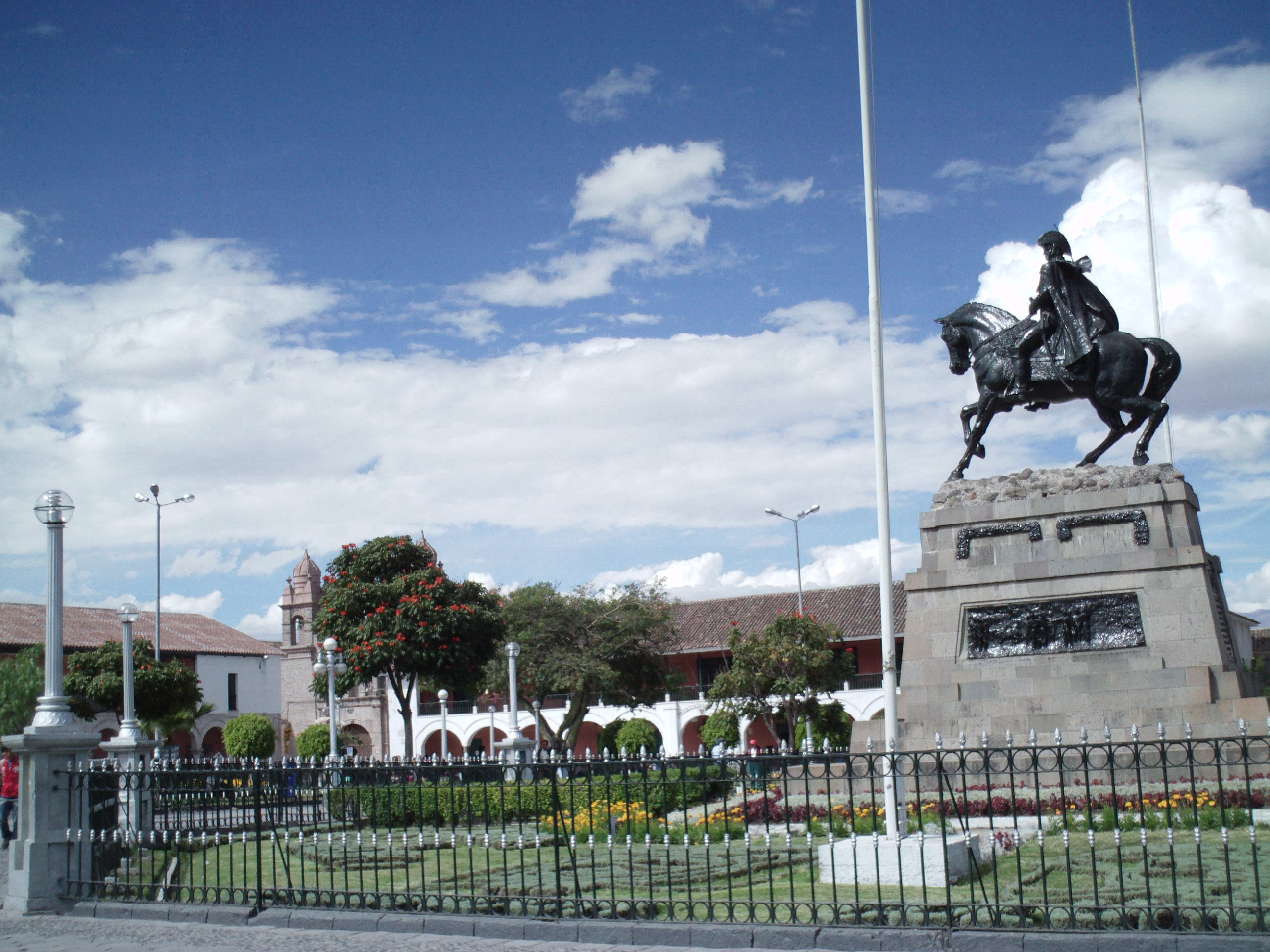
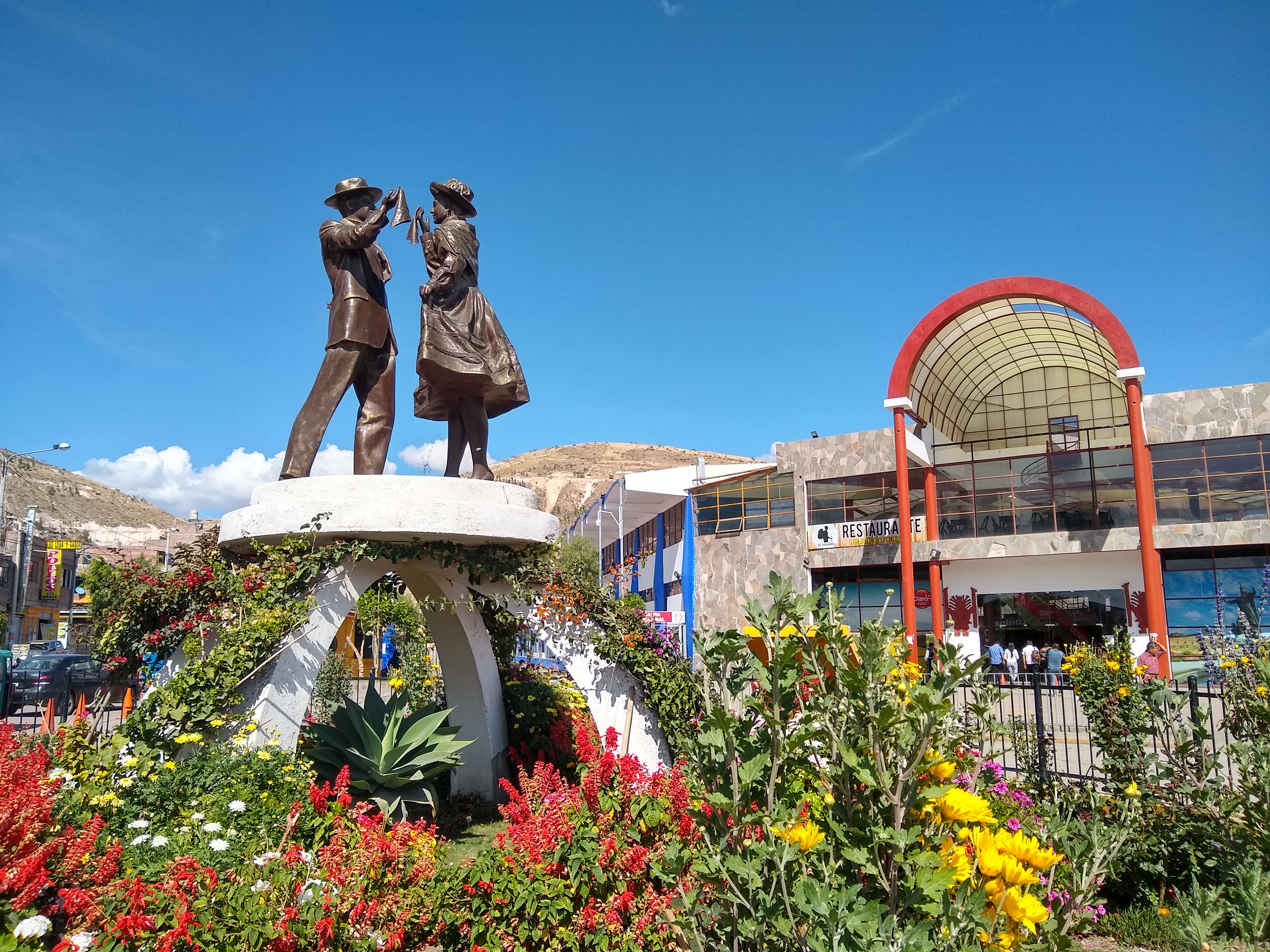
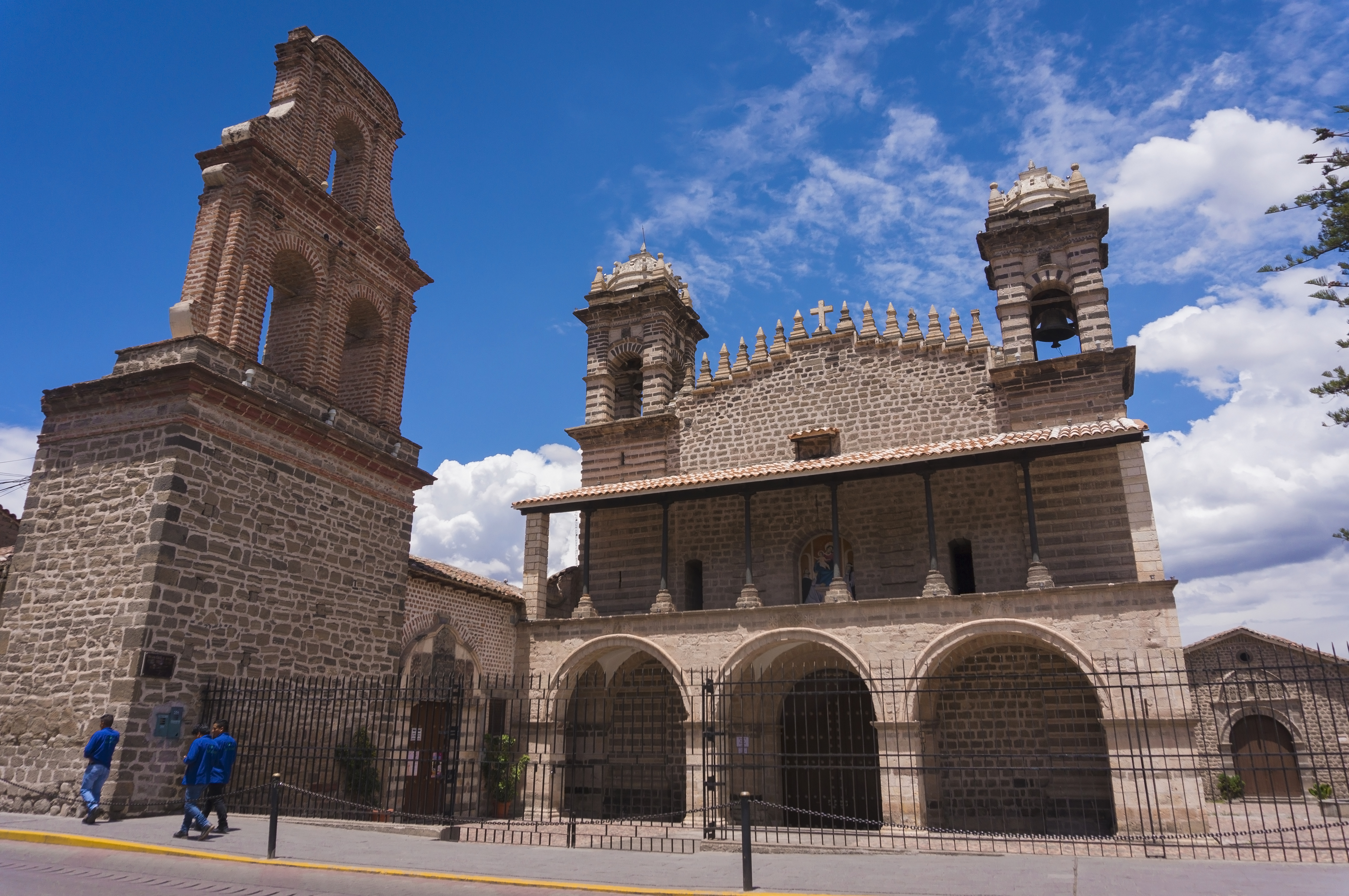
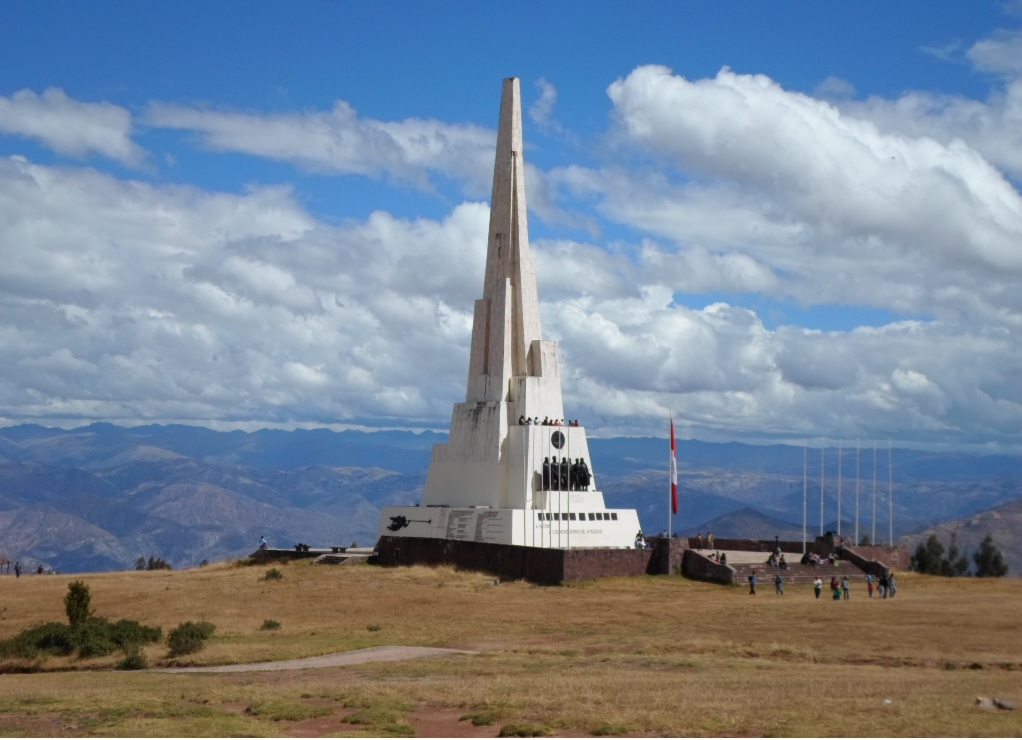
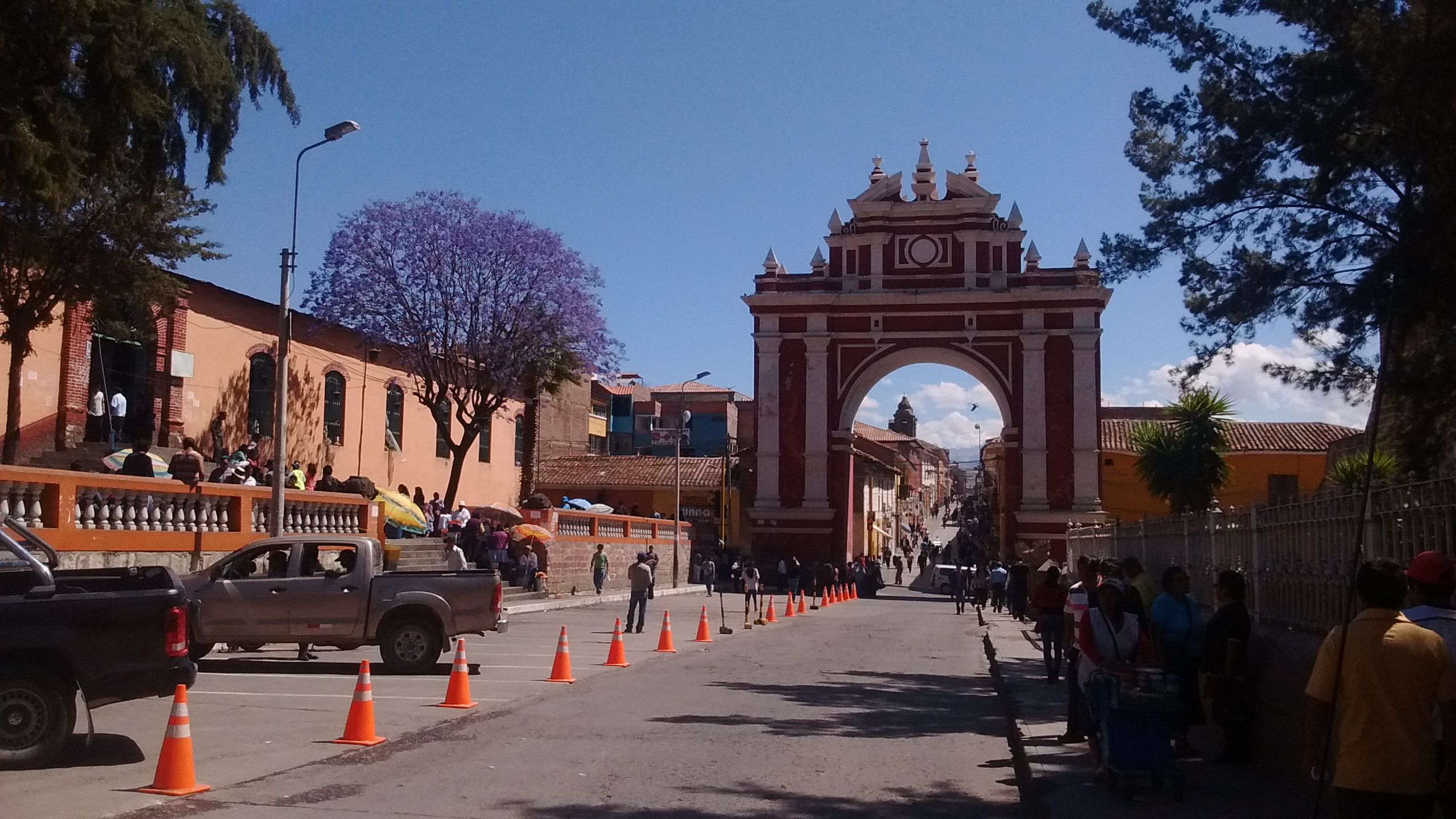
- Ayacucho Basilica Cathedral Plaza de Armas de Ayacucho Terminal Terrestre Los Libertadores Templo de Santo Domingo de Guzmán Pampa de Ayacucho Historic Sanctuary Ayacucho Triumphal Arch

- Flag Coat of arms
- Nickname(s): Ciudad de las 33 iglesias (City of the 33 Churches); Ciudad señorial (Stately City or Manorial City); Muy noble y leal ciudad (Very Noble and Loyal City); Capital del arte popular y de la artesanía del Perú (Capital of Folk Art and Handcrafts of Peru); Cuna de la libertad hispanoamericana (Cradle of Hispanic-American Freedom); Capital religiosa del Perú (Religious Capital of Peru); La Sevilla peruana (The Peruvian Seville)
- Interactive map of Ayacucho
- Location within Peru Location within South America
- Coordinates: 13°09′47″S 74°13′28″W
- Country: Peru
- Region: Ayacucho
- Province: Huamanga
- District: Ayacucho
- Settled: April 25, 1540
- Named for: Battle of Ayacucho

Government
  - Mayor: Juan Carlos Arango Claudio

Area
  - Total: 2,981.37 km^{2} (1,151.11 sq mi)
- Elevation: 2,761 m (9,058 ft)

Population (2015)
  - Total: 180,766
  - Density: 60.6319/km^{2} (157.036/sq mi)
- Demonym(s): Ayacuchano, -1
- Time zone: UTC-5 (PET)
  - Summer (DST): UTC-5 (PET)
- Area code: 66
- Website: http://www.munihuamanga.gob.pe/

Ayacucho (Spanish pronunciation: [aʝaˈkutʃo], Quechua: Ayak'uchu, derived from the words aya ("death" or "soul") and k'uchu ("corner")), founded in 1540 as San Juan de la Frontera de Huamanga and known simply as Huamanga (Quechua: Wamanga) until 1825, is the capital city of Ayacucho Region and of Huamanga Province, Ayacucho Region, Peru.

Its original name, which continues to be the alternative name of the city, dates back to the Incan and Viceregal periods of its history, until its official change by Simón Bolívar in 1825 through a decree to commemorate the battle of Ayacucho during the Peruvian War of Independence. Bolívar issued the decree on February 15, 1825, changing the name from "Huamanga" to "Ayacucho", after the battle that decisively established the total independence of the nascent Peruvian Republic.

Ayacucho is famous for its 33 churches, which represent one for each year of Jesus' life. Ayacucho has large religious celebrations, especially during the Holy Week of Easter. These celebrations include horse races featuring Peruvian Caballos de Paso and the traditional running of the bulls, known locally as the jalatoro or pascuatoro. The jalatoro is similar to the Spanish encierro, except that the bulls are led by horses of the Morochucos.

== Toponymy ==
=== Huamanga ===
The traditional name of the locality, dating back to pre-Hispanic times, was Huamanga (written as Guamanga in the earliest documents). As a Spanish city, it was founded on April 25, 1540, under the name San Juan de la Frontera de Huamanga ("Saint John of the Frontier of Huamanga"). The title San Juan honored Saint John the Evangelist, while Frontera ("Frontier") referred to its role as a military frontier and Spanish stronghold against the attacks of Manco Inca.

During the civil wars among the Spanish conquerors, the city's name was changed to San Juan de la Victoria de Huamanga ("Saint John of the Victory of Huamanga") following the victory of the royalist armies over the rebel forces of Diego de Almagro the Younger at the Battle of Chupas on September 16, 1542. It was later renamed Ayacucho in honor of the place where the famous battle of independence had taken place.

The etymology of the name Huamanga is somewhat obscure from the perspective of contemporary Quechua. Today, specialists generally agree that the ending -nga corresponds to the concrete nominalizing suffix -nqa found in General Quechua, also recognizable in place names such as Paramonga or alternatively written as -nca, as in the Quechua-derived word pachamanca. In all Southern Quechua varieties, this suffix later evolved into -na. However, identifying the nominalized verbal root remains a matter of debate.

Linguist Rodolfo Cerrón-Palomino has proposed that the root derives from the Colonial Quechua verb wama- (written guama-), meaning "to inaugurate" or "to come into the light." Accordingly, he interprets the original meaning of the toponym as "place to be inaugurated" or "pacarina," that is, "the place where one emerges into the light."

Among the popular folk etymologies is a story that Inca Viracocha rested at this place during one of his campaigns and personally fed a hawk that landed on his shoulders. According to the legend, the Inca said waman ka (often translated as "Here, hawk!"), although the phrase is grammatically incorrect in Quechua. Another popular explanation derives the name through haplology from the hypothetical compound waman qaqa, meaning "hawk rock" or "rock of the hawks" in Quechua.

=== Ayacucho ===
The original name Huamanga was officially changed to Ayacucho by decree of Liberator Simón Bolívar on February 15, 1825. The change honored the victory of the patriot army in the Battle of Ayacucho. Thus, the name of the battlefield was transferred to the nearby city.

The etymology of Ayacucho remains transparent to any contemporary Quechua speaker. It derives from aya ("dead person," "corpse") and kuchu ("corner"), literally meaning "corner of the dead" or "corner of the corpses." As a place name, it had already been common throughout the Andean region during the colonial period. During the republican era, it was widely used to name places, even leading to the renaming of the city of La Paz as "La Paz de Ayacucho." The association between the name and those who died in the 1824 battle is therefore only a later folk etymology.

=== Demonym and nickname ===
The demonym for someone from Huamanga is huamanguino, formerly spelled guamanguino, as seen, for example, in the illustrations of Guaman Poma and on the coat of arms of the National University of San Cristóbal of Huamanga.

Likewise, unlike the cities named Ayacucho in Argentina, Bolivia, Ecuador, and Venezuela (whose inhabitants are called ayacuchenses), natives of the Peruvian city of Ayacucho are known as ayacuchanos.

The chronicler Pedro Cieza de León, in his work Crónica del Perú, wrote that Huamanga was home to many wild pigeons, which attracted numerous peregrine falcons (Falco peregrinus), birds that particularly enjoy feeding on medium-sized birds such as ducks, hens, and chickens.

Traditionally, the affectionate nickname (hipocorístico) for the people of Ayacucho or Huamanga is wallpa suwa, meaning "chicken thief."

”...[...] Dicen, que cuando se fundó Huamanga en el siglo XVI, se asentaron muchísimos españoles de las distintas clases y estirpes en la ciudad. Además de gente de abolengo, había también otros aventureros y gente sin escrúpulos reclutados de la península. Con el tiempo estos alcanzaron riqueza y posición social y algunos llegaron a formar parte de la aristocracia local. Se había transformado en personas supuestamente honorables. [...] Pero hay un dicho: «gallina que come huevo aunque le quemen el pico». Pues a esta casta de hombres, nada podía quitarle la manía de disfrutar de lo ajeno. [...] Entre ellos, un tal Negro Ruiz, decía que gallina robada sabía más sabrosa y él mismo se encargada de hurtos. Este verenable wallpa sua murió ahogado al caer en su propia letrina persiguiendo a una atlética gallina de los Toledo. Bueno, y como el mal ejemplo cunde, el robo de gallinas se puso en boga por toda la colonia y después de ella. [...] Desde ese entonces, todo huamanguino lleva de apellido la imborrable etiqueta de «roba gallina»..

"...They say that when Huamanga was founded in the sixteenth century, a great many Spaniards of different social classes and lineages settled in the city. Alongside noble families were adventurers and unscrupulous individuals recruited from the Iberian Peninsula. Over time, many of them acquired wealth and social standing, and some even became part of the local aristocracy. They had supposedly become respectable people.

But there is a saying: 'A hen that has learned to eat eggs will keep doing so even if its beak is burned.' Nothing could cure this group of men of their habit of coveting what belonged to others.

Among them was a man known as Negro Ruiz, who claimed that a stolen chicken tasted better, and he personally carried out such thefts. This famous wallpa suwa ('chicken thief') drowned after falling into his own latrine while chasing one of the Toledo family's particularly athletic hens.

As bad examples tend to spread, chicken stealing became fashionable throughout the colony and continued even afterward. Since then, every Huamanguino has carried the indelible label of 'chicken thief.'"

== History ==
=== Early settlements ===
Vestiges of human settlements more than 15,000 years old have been found at the site of Pikimachay, about 25 km north of Ayacucho. From 500 to 900, the region was occupied by the Wari culture, which became known as the first expansionist empire based in the Andes before the Inca Empire.

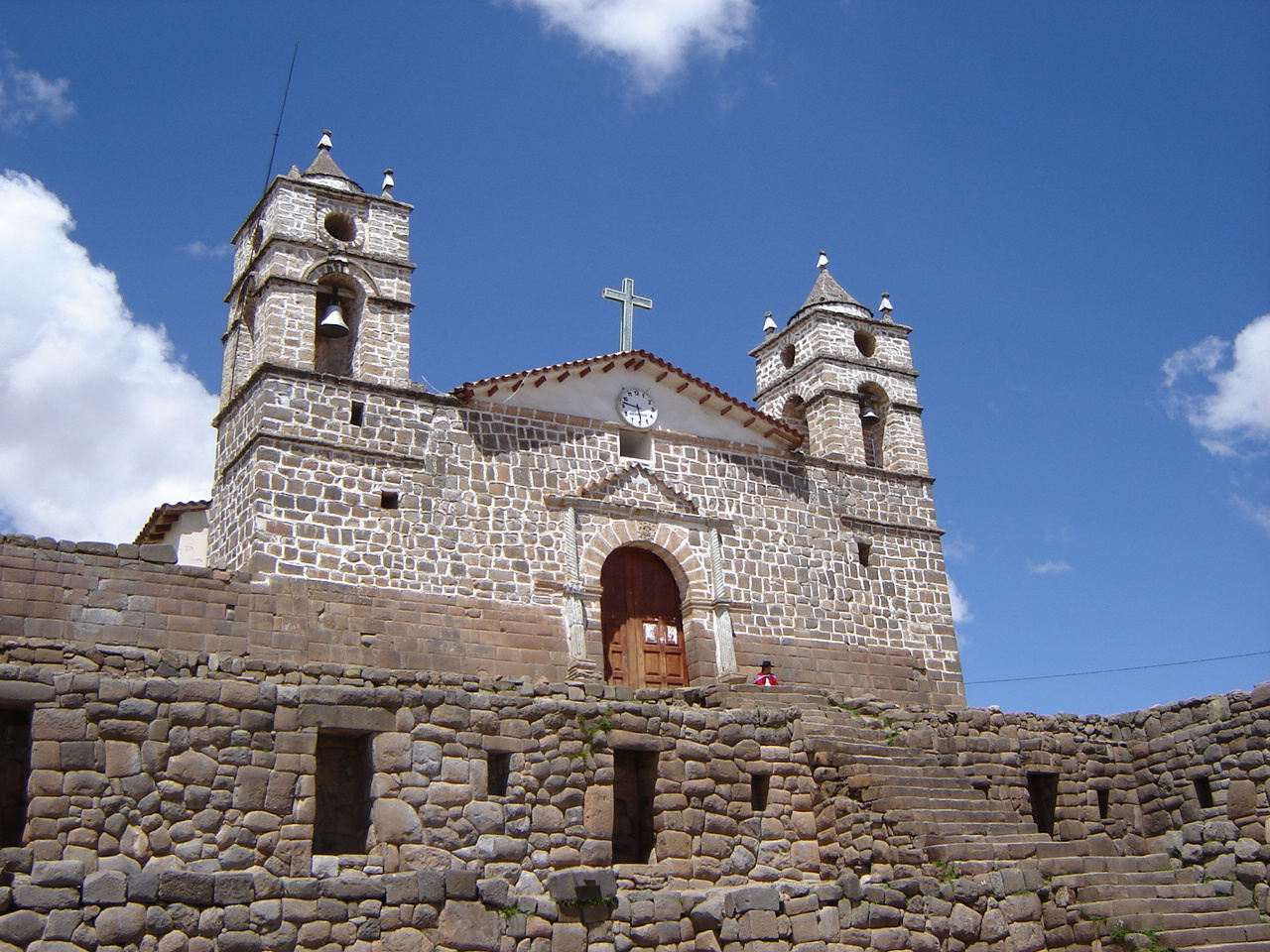
Cathedral of Vilcashuaman, built on the remains of an Inca temple located in a town near Ayacucho.

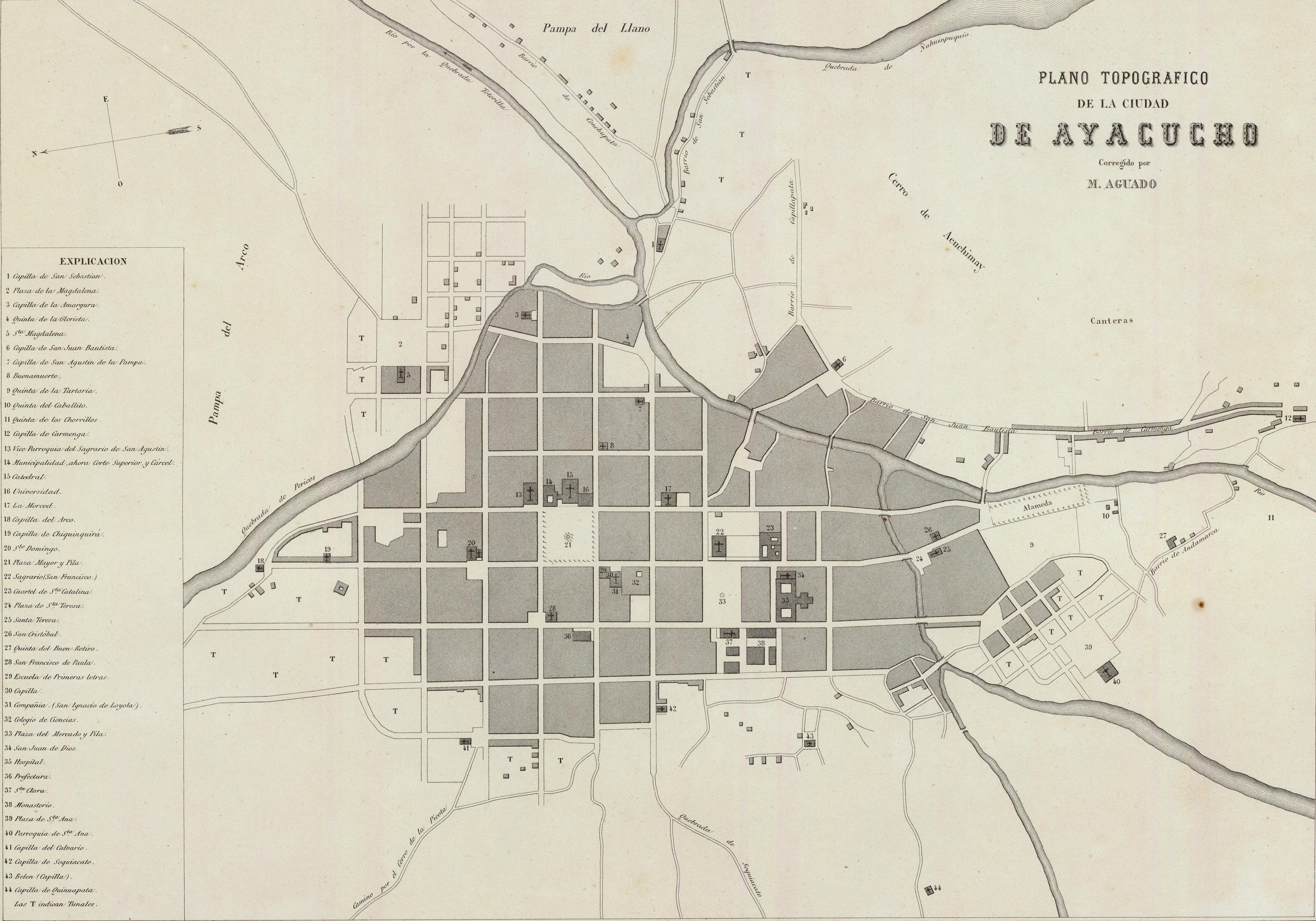
A map of Ayacucho in 1865, Spanish language edition

The Ayacucho region was inhabited by varying indigenous cultures for thousands of years. During the Early Intermediate period (200 BC – 600 AD) the Nazca culture settled in the south-west, and the Warpa culture arose in the center of the Ayacucho region, the Wari Empire emerged as Huarpa cultures interacted with the nearby Nasca Culture at a time of intense interregional exchanges and widespread disruption to existing cultural traditions. During the Middle Horizon period (600 – 1000 AD), at its zenith the Wari state reigned over most of the highlands and coast of Peru, centered near the present-day city of Ayacucho (Huamanga), the Wari became the largest dominant culture in the Andes region before the Inca came into existence. The Wari civilization collapsed by about 1000 AD, and the capital city of Wari was abandoned.

With the end of the Wari culture, the Late Intermediate period (1000 AD – 1476 AD) is said to begin, while some post-Wari cultures continued to further develop during this era, particularly cultures from coastal Peru, the Late Intermediate era is marked by population decline and substantial cultural regression over extensive areas of the Peruvian highlands, the Ayacucho region became one of the most affected areas, urban planning ceased to be, people abandoned virtually all cities, if not all, and dispersed into rural hamlets. New tribal cultures — well differentiated from the old Wari — arose in the Ayacucho region, over time these became a series of relatively powerful warlike chiefdoms that controlled region, according to colonial chroniclers these tribes were united into a confederacy by the time Inca began to expand, referred in the Spanish accounts as the "Chanca confederacy", an alliance formed by the Chanca, Parinacocha, Vilca, Sora, and Rucana (Lucana) cultures, among other ayllu clans. After a series of fierce battles the Inca managed to defeat and conquer the Chanka confederacy and integrated the area into the Inca Empire, the Inca founded Vilcashuaman within Vilcas' culture territory, one of the most populous cities known to have existed in the Inca Empire, capital of the Inca province (wamani) of Vilcas. Huamanga was another of the administrative centers in the region, founded at a place called Pocra.

=== Colonial era ===
The Spanish colonial founding of Huamanga was led by conqueror Francisco Pizarro on April 25, 1540, who named it San Juan de la Frontera de Huamanga. Due to the constant Incan rebellion led by Manco Inca Yupanqui against the Spanish in the zone, Pizarro was quick to populate the settlement with a small number of Spaniards brought from Lima and Cusco. On May 17, 1544, by Royal decree, Ayacucho was titled La Muy Noble y Leal Ciudad de Huamanga (the most noble and loyal city of Huamanga), the highest designation in the Spanish hierarchy of naming cities. The city's main University was founded on July 3, 1677, as San Cristóbal of Huamanga University. Ayacucho was significant in the colonial era for being an administrative center, a stopping-off point between Lima and Cuzco, and the residence of mercury miner from Huancavelica, as well as local land owners.

=== War of independence ===
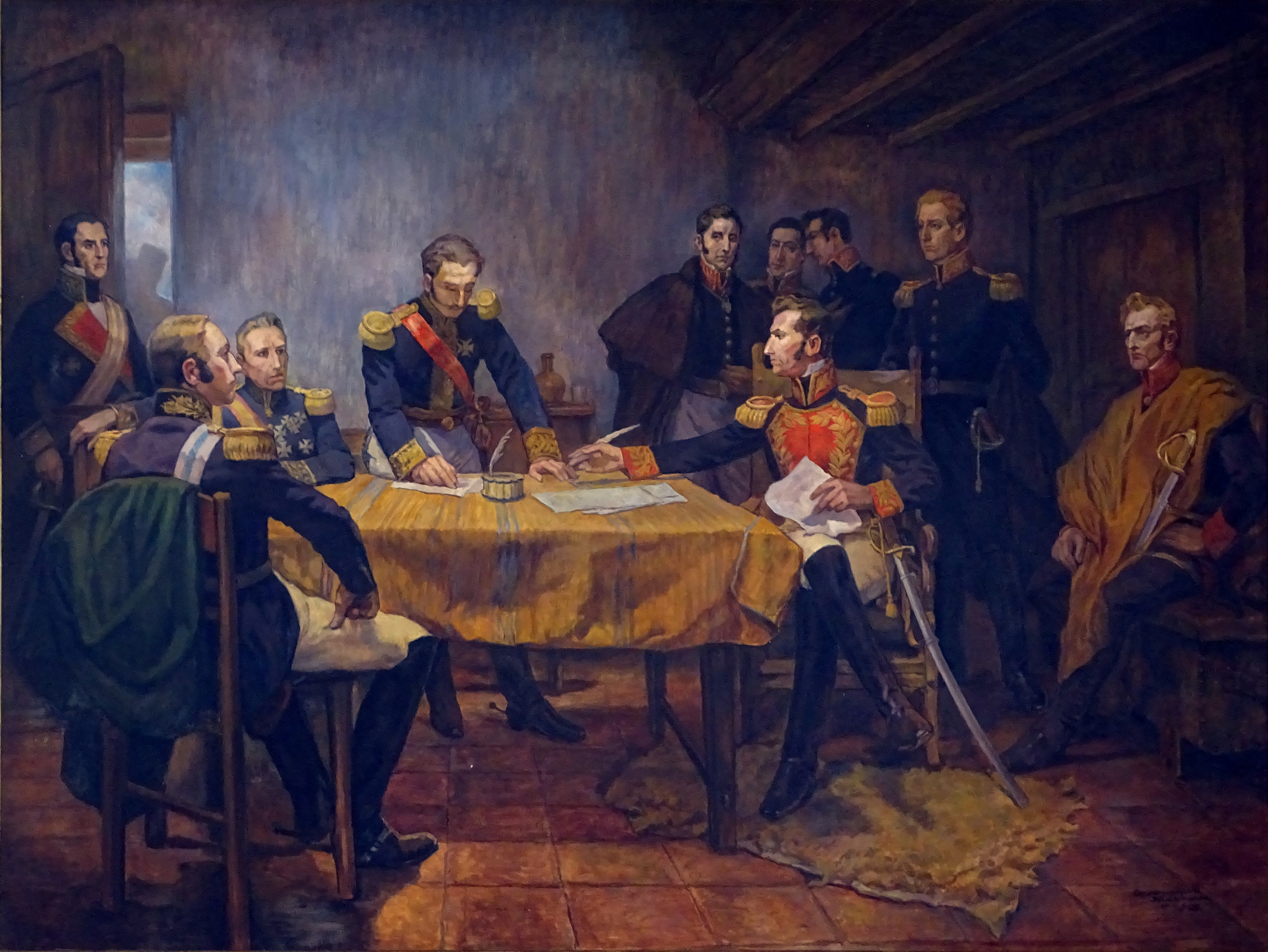
Capitulation of Ayacucho.

In 1820, General Juan Antonio Álvarez de Arenales, under the instructions of Don José de San Martín, arrived in the city during the so-called Intermediate Campaign, which sought to attack Lima through the Andes while San Martín did so through the coast. Thus, Arenales declared independence in Huamanga on November 1, 1820.

The Battle of Ayacucho was the last armed clash between the Spanish Army (formed mostly by Peruvian mestizos and indigenous peoples) and independentists during the Peruvian War of Independence, and the independents' victory ensured independence. Taking place on 9 December 1924, the battle developed in the nearby pampas of La Quinua on December 9, 1824. Independentist forces were led by Antonio José de Sucre, Simón Bolívar's lieutenant. Viceroy José de la Serna e Hinojosa was wounded, and after the battle second commander-in-chief José de Canterac signed the final capitulation of the Royalist army. The independent victory sealed the independence of Peru and South America. La Paz, now the seat of government of Bolivia, was similarly renamed La Paz de Ayacucho following this battle.

On February 15, 1825, Simón Bolívar changed the city's name to Ayacucho, renaming it after the historical Battle of Ayacucho. Upon seeing so many casualties on the battlefield, citizens called the area Ayakuchu, aya meaning "dead" and kuchu meaning "corner" in Ayacucho Quechua.

=== Republican era ===
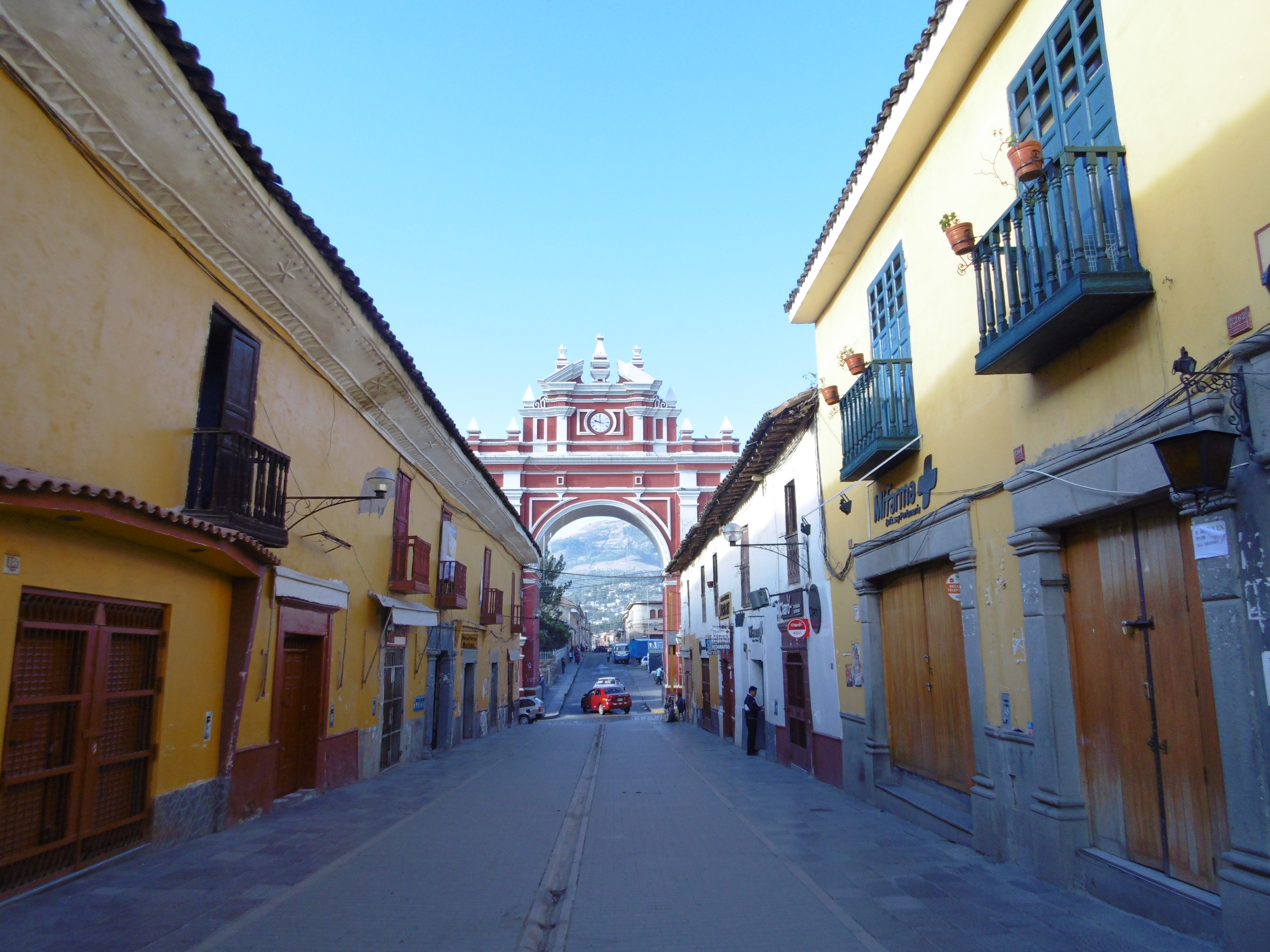
Calle Ayacuchana

Although the city gained a new name and some fame, the economy declined following independence. There were attempts to revive the city's fortunes, with a planned railway link to Peru's network, but the line was terminated in Huancavelica. A highway was subsequently constructed in 1968. The city's economy is based on agriculture and light manufacturing, including textiles, pottery, leather goods, and filigree ware. It is a regional tourism destination, known for its 33 churches built in the colonial period, and for the nearby battlefield of La Quinua, where the Ayacucho battle was fought in 1824. The University of San Cristóbal was reopened in 1959. The city's population began to increase, but violent political unrest destabilized the region forced migration of many.

In 1980, the far-left terrorist organization known as the Shining Path (Sendero Luminoso) used Ayachucho as its base for its campaign against the Peruvian government, even staging an assault on the Ayacucho prison in 1982. The campaign faded after the leader Abimael Guzmán Reynoso was captured in 1992 and put in prison. The region headed by Ayacucho is rural and one of the poorest of all the country. With the peace of the last 15 years, the citizens work hard to improve the living conditions and attract jobs.

== Geography ==
=== Location ===
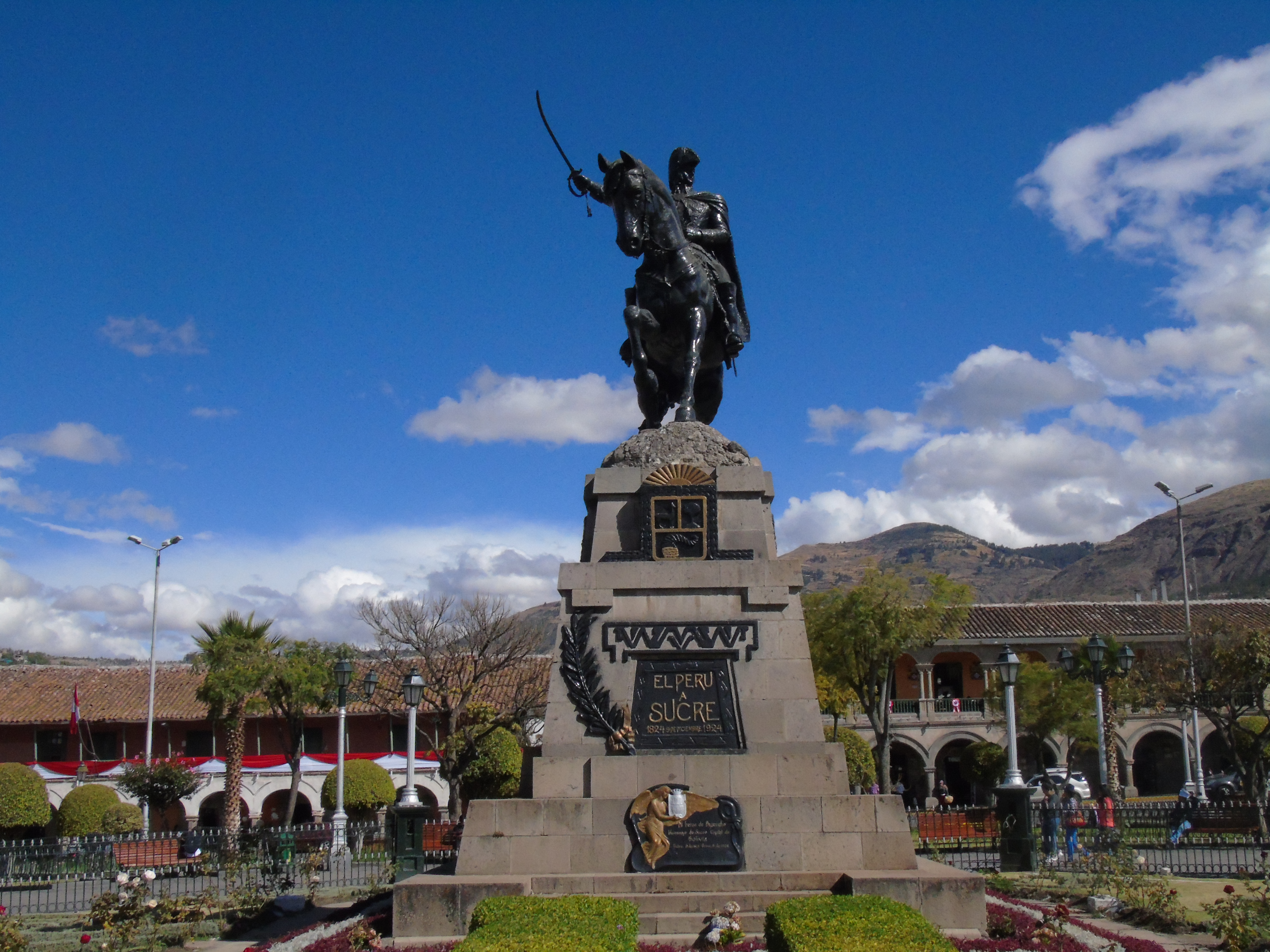
Mariscal Sucre Monument

The city of Ayacucho is located in the northwestern corner of the Ayacucho Department and in the south-central highlands of the country, in the southern area of the Andes. The city occupies the district of Ayacucho, also known as the historic center, and erroneously called 'cercado', as well as the urban area of the districts of Carmen Alto, Andrés Avelino Cáceres, San Juan Bautista and Jesús Nazareno, within the valleys of the Huatatas and Chacco rivers.

=== Climate ===
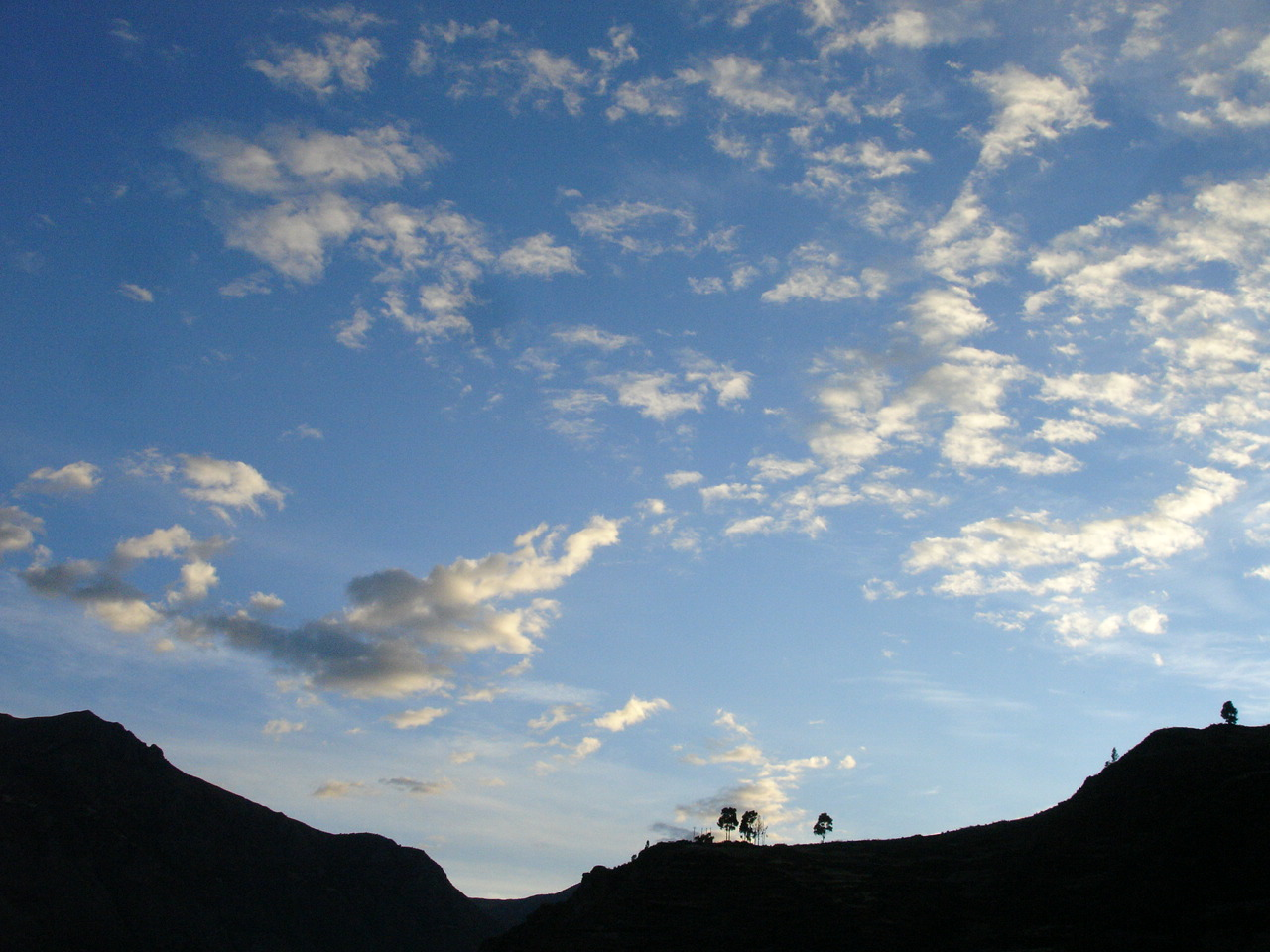
Climate of Ayacucho

Owing to its high elevation, Ayacucho has a monsoon-influenced, cold semi-arid climate (Köppen BSk). Aside from precipitation and from a thermal standpoint, the city has the subtropical highland (Cfb) with uniform rainfall.

Climate data for Ayacucho
Month	Jan	Feb	Mar	Apr	May	Jun	Jul	Aug	Sep	Oct	Nov	Dec	Year
Mean daily maximum °C (°F)	23.6 (74.5)	23.5 (74.3)	23.0 (73.4)	23.8 (74.8)	23.9 (75.0)	23.2 (73.8)	22.7 (72.9)	23.6 (74.5)	23.8 (74.8)	24.9 (76.8)	25.5 (77.9)	24.6 (76.3)	23.8 (74.9)
Mean daily minimum °C (°F)	10.5 (50.9)	10.5 (50.9)	10.3 (50.5)	9.7 (49.5)	8.2 (46.8)	7.1 (44.8)	6.6 (43.9)	7.7 (45.9)	9.2 (48.6)	10.1 (50.2)	10.7 (51.3)	10.7 (51.3)	9.3 (48.7)
Average precipitation mm (inches)	117.1 (4.61)	101.5 (4.00)	93.6 (3.69)	23.8 (0.94)	23.9 (0.94)	23.2 (0.91)	22.7 (0.89)	23.6 (0.93)	23.8 (0.94)	24.9 (0.98)	25.5 (1.00)	24.6 (0.97)	528.2 (20.8)
Source: National Meteorology and Hydrology Service of Peru

== Demographics ==
Although there is no official delimitation defined, the metropolitan area of Ayacucho comprises 5 districts of the province of Huamanga. These districts have a population of 229,455 inhabitants in 2020, according to the INEI.

According to the XI Population Census and VI Housing Census conducted by the National Institute of Statistics and Informatics in 2007, the city of Ayacucho had a population of 151,019 inhabitants. Its annual growth rate was 2.5%.

In 2014, Ayacucho ranked 16th among Peruvian cities in terms of population.

== Economy ==
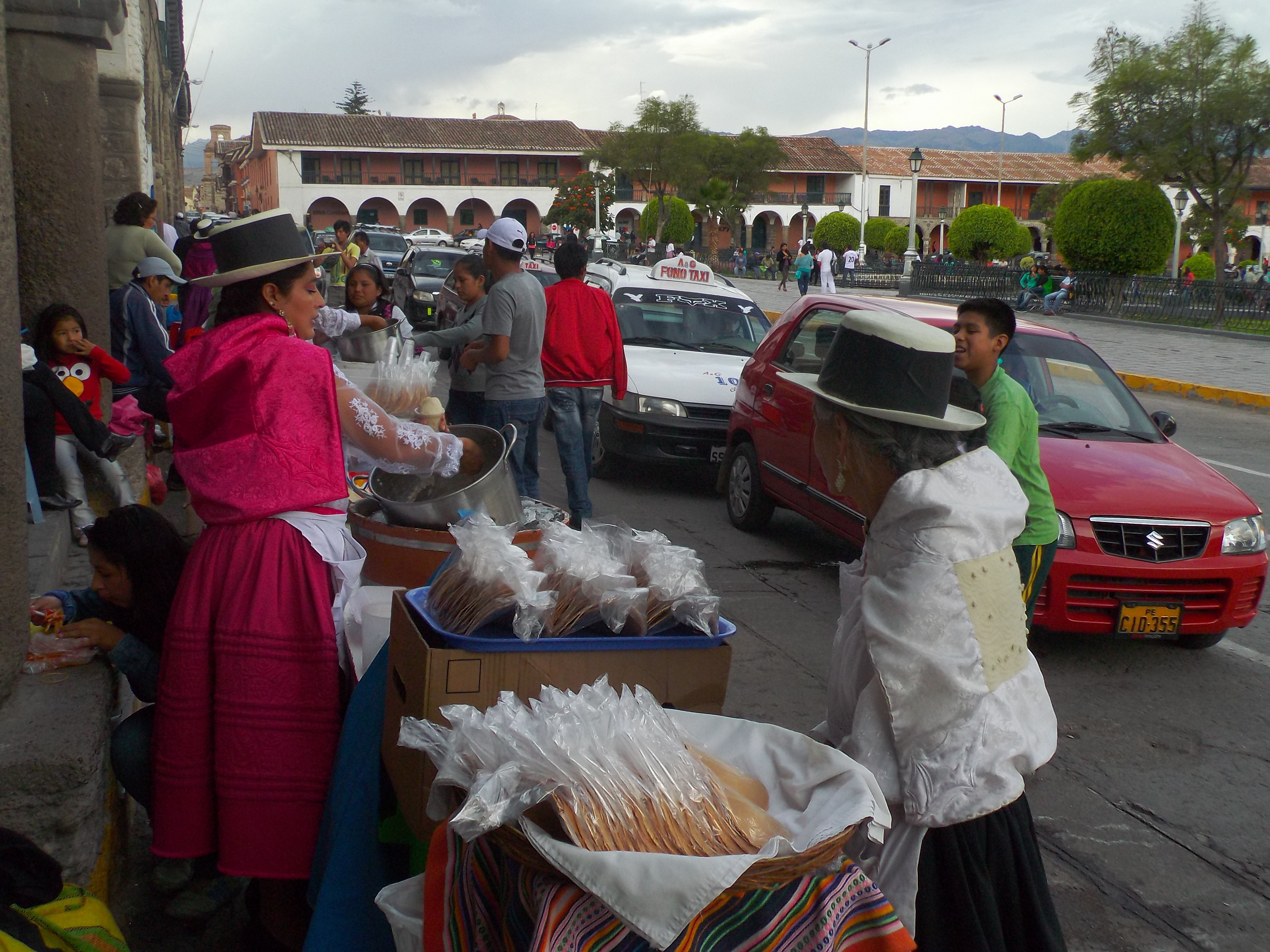
Muyuchi in the Plaza de Armas

According to the productive structure of 2006, Ayacucho contributed 1% of the national Gross Added Value (GVA), maintaining its share with respect to that recorded in the base year 1994. The dynamics of the economy is basically influenced by the behavior of the agricultural, government services, trade, other services and construction sectors. The city houses most of the tertiary sector of the entire department. This represents 52% of the departmental GVA, highlighting government services (17.4%), trade (15.7%) and other services (12.4%).29

The city has two main markets: the Magdalena market, in the neighborhood of the same name, and the Carlos F. Vivanco market, called Mercado Central, in the historic center of the city.

== Society and culture ==
=== Architecture ===
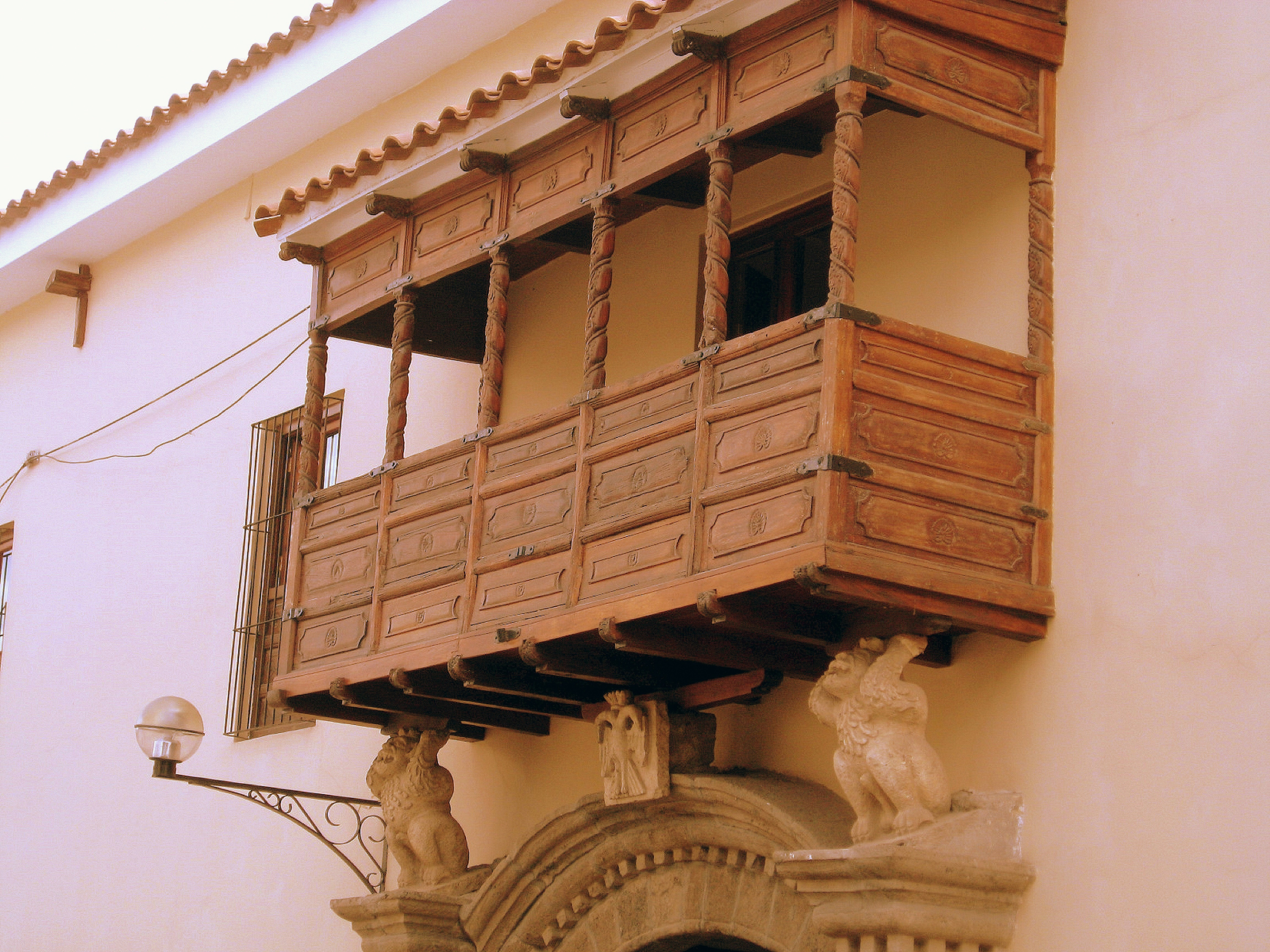
Balcony of the Casona Jáuregui

Ayacucho is known for its many churches and cathedrals, giving it the name of ''The City of Churches''. The oldest Catholic churches date back to the 16th century, when the first religious orders settled in the area. In general, the colonial churches of Ayacucho combine Hispanic, Latin and Arabic elements with indigenous features, such as stones carved with motifs of the local flora and fauna. Some of the most iconic colonial churches includes, the Cathedral Basilica of St. Mary, Templo de Santo Domingo and the Covenent de San Francisco de Asís.

The encomenderos, corregidors, landowners, miners, built their houses in Huamanga, thinking of the mansions in the style of the Spanish cities of Seville, Cordoba, Ávila and Granada of that time. Despite the passage of time, the mansions still retain much of their old elegance. The balconies of these mansions are very iconic, similar to those in said Spanish cities and also to other Peruvian cities such as Trujillo and Lima.

=== Art ===
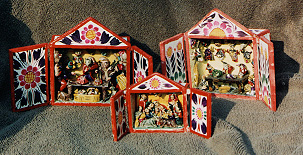
Ayacucho Altarpiece

The richness and quality of Ayacucho's crafts, in its various manifestations, have made it be considered as the "Capital of Popular Art and Crafts of Peru". Ayacucho's crafts combine pre-Columbian techniques and traditions with Hispanic contributions and the permanent creativity of the region's inhabitants. Its most best-known expressions are the Ayacucho altarpieces, Huamanga stone carvings, and silver and filigree work. Ayacucho's ceramics are very renowned and characteristic. Since 2019, Ayacucho has been part of the UNESCO Creative Cities Network, in the category of crafts and popular arts.

The Ayacucho Altarpieces, direct descendants of the Spanish San Marcos or San Antonio boxes, depict scenes with profound Andean meaning on their interior. They are a traditional example of the creative and artistic capacity of the artisans of this land.

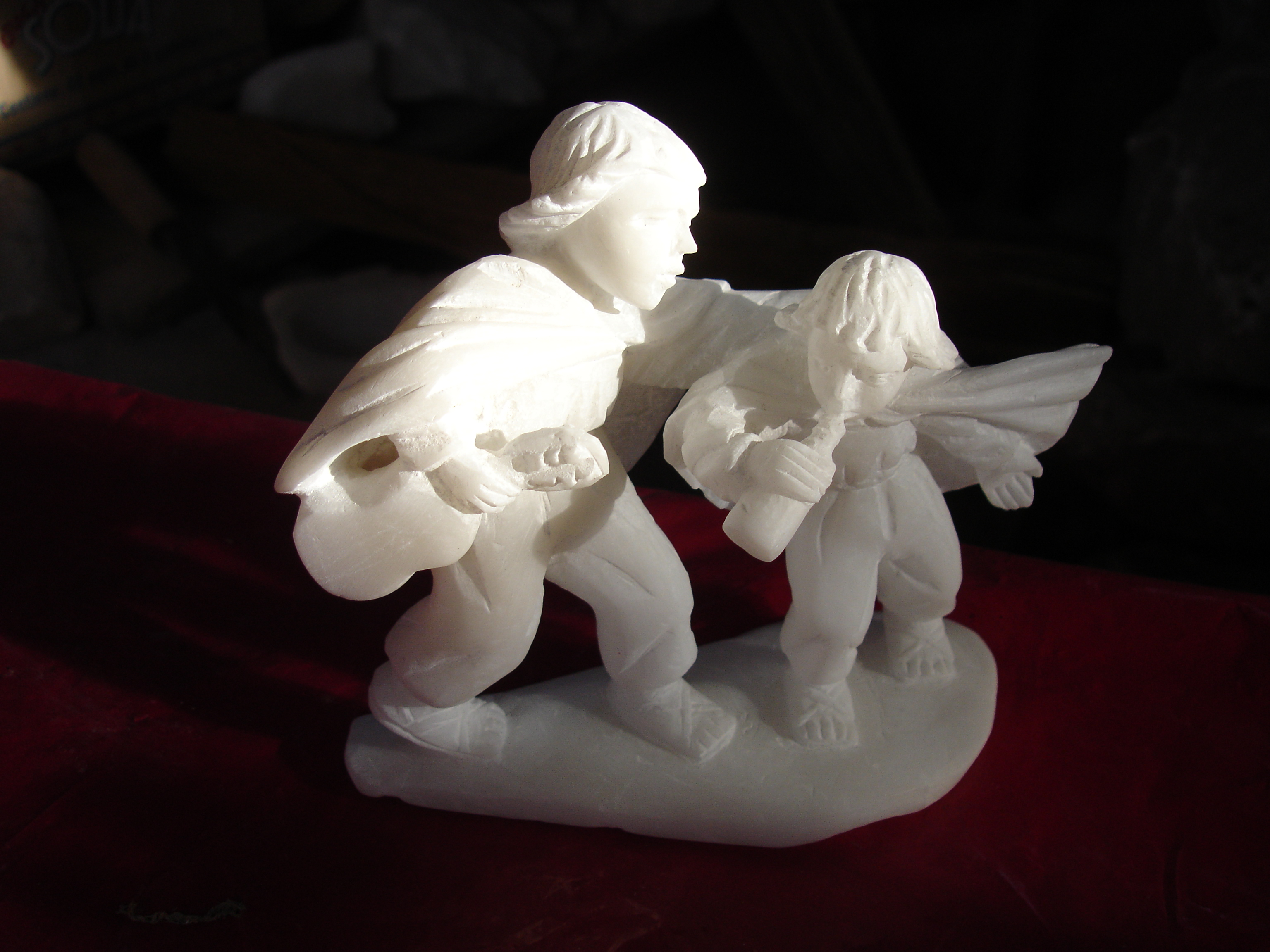
Huamanga stone

Huamanga stone is the local name given to alabaster, a white mineral, sometimes with shades ranging from grey or lead to sepia. It is a sediment of volcanic origin and is characterized by its easy malleability, its whitish color and its exclusivity.

=== Education ===
There are around 60 educational institutions in the city, both public and private. The administration of basic education in the city is in charge of the Educational Management Unit (UGEL) Huamanga, attached to the Ayacucho Regional Education Directorate of the Ministry of Education. Due to the strong religious presence in the city, several of these institutions are linked to religious congregations.

=== Health ===
As the administrative and economic capital, the city has the largest public and private health centers in the department. They are managed by the Ayacucho Health Department.

=== Music ===
Ayacucho is widely recognized for its rich musical traditions, which form an essential part of the region’s cultural identity. The city is especially known for yaraví, a slow and melancholic genre often described as the “Andean blues,” characterized by poetic lyrics that express themes of longing, loss, and emotional reflection.[citation needed] Another prominent genre is huayno, a lively and rhythmic style commonly performed during festivals, social gatherings, and community celebrations. Huayno in Ayacucho often blends Spanish melodic influences with Indigenous Quechua rhythms, making it a central part of the region’s musical expression.

Traditional instruments play a major role in Ayacucho’s sound. The charango, a ten-stringed Andean instrument, is especially associated with local musicians and is frequently used in yaraví and huayno performances. Other important instruments include the guitar, harp, and quena (Andean flute), all of which contribute to the distinctive tone of Ayacucho’s music.

Ayacucho also serves as an important center for musical preservation and performance. Many songs are sung in Quechua, helping maintain the language and transmit oral traditions across generations. Local festivals—particularly the Carnaval Ayacuchano—feature comparsas, dance troupes, and musicians who perform traditional songs that highlight the region’s Indigenous heritage and communal identity.

Several influential Peruvian musicians come from Ayacucho. Among the most notable is Raúl García Zárate, internationally recognized for his mastery of the Andean guitar and his interpretations of yaraví. Another influential figure is Manuelcha Prado, a celebrated guitarist and folklorist known for promoting Ayacucho’s musical traditions nationally and internationally.

=== Religion and festivals ===
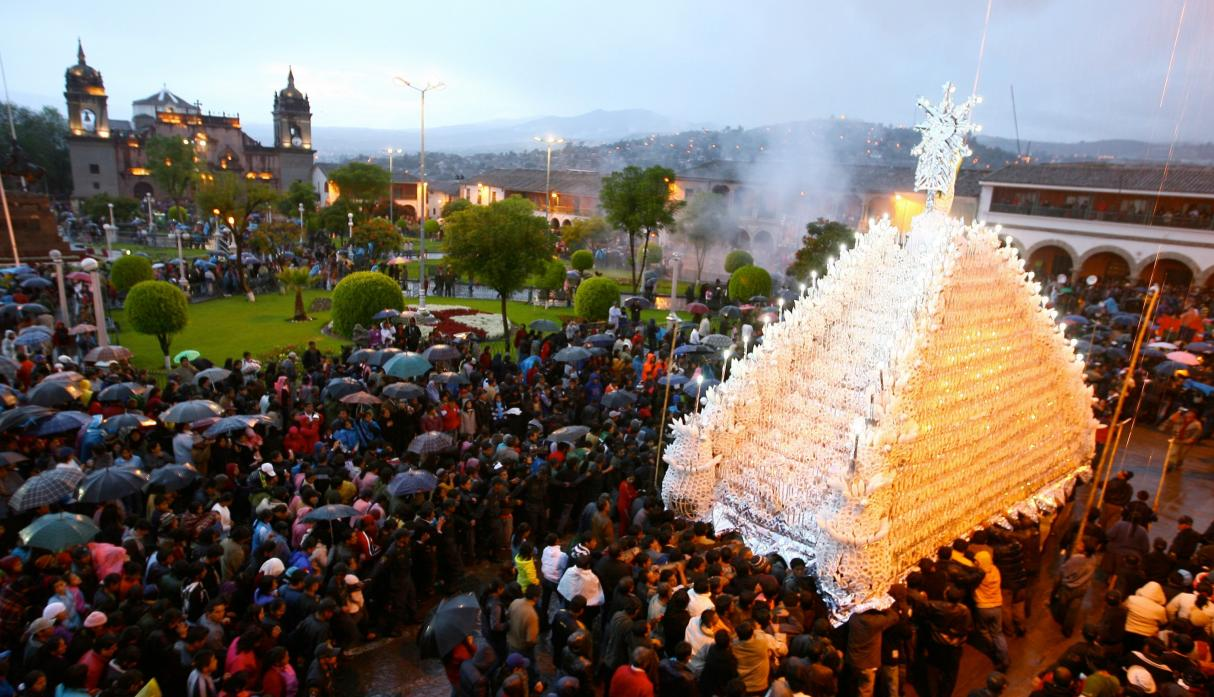
Ayacucho Holy Week

==== Holy Week ====
Ayacucho stands out for its ancestral customs and traditions, which reflect the faith of its people. Ayacucho's Holy Week (Semana Santa) is the second most important in the world after that of Seville. In these two cities, the ancient rituals of Holy Week are maintained, where a special religious fervour is felt and perceived. In this Latin American capital of Holy Week, the festival is celebrated for ten days, during which the population and tourists participate in religious ceremonies and processions, as well as in cultural, artistic, gastronomic and commercial activities. The particularity of this Holy Week is that it mixes European traditions with Andean cultural characteristics.

==== Carnaval de Ayacucho ====
During the month of February, the Carnaval de Ayacucho is a celebration that officially lasts three days, but which begins a month in advance with the arrival of the rural troupes, which come from different places in the department, both to compete in the great rural troupe contest and to dance through the streets of the city.

=== Cuisine ===
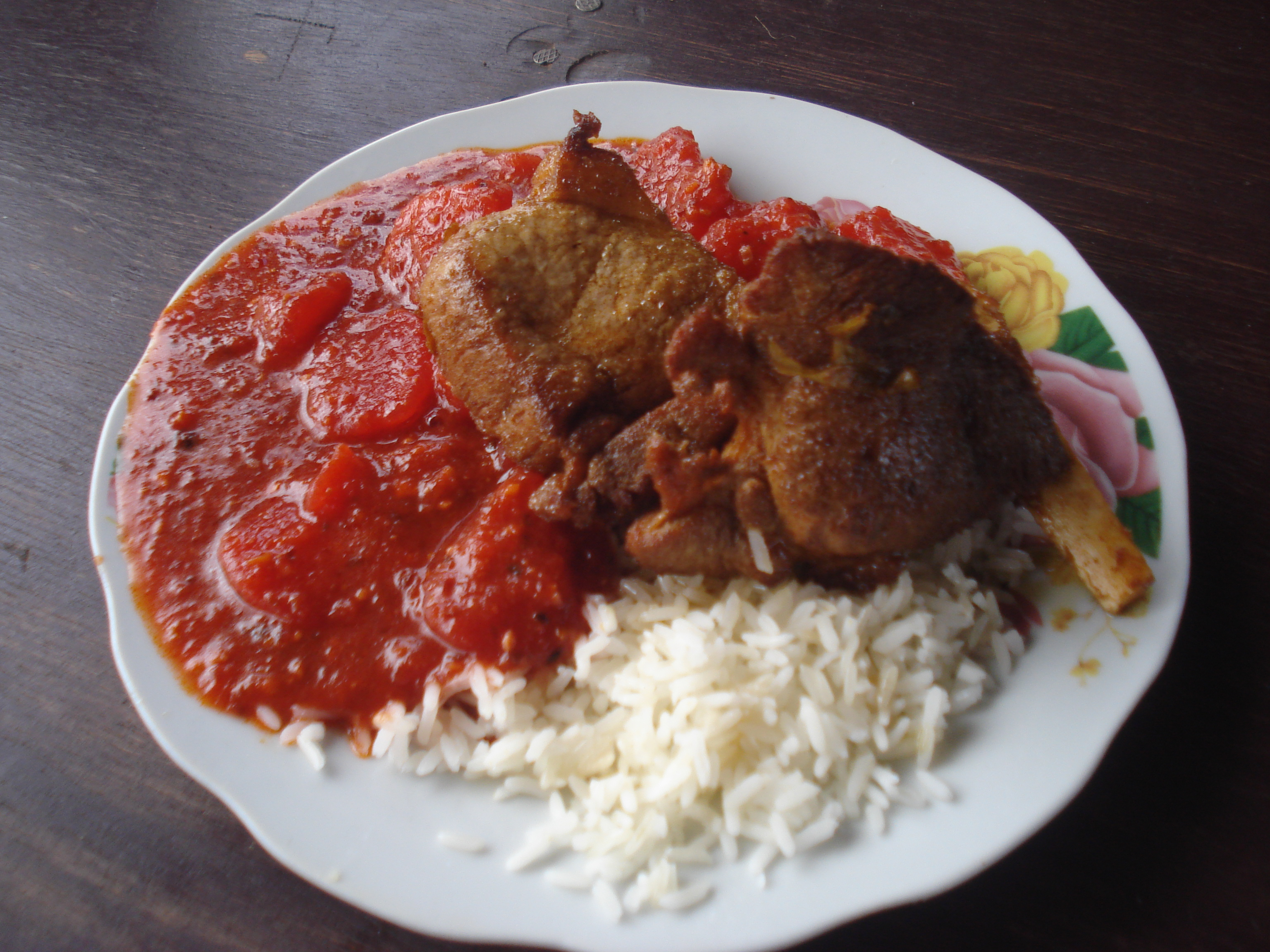
Puca Picante

Like other cities in Peru, Ayacucho has a variety of dishes, drinks and pastries. Among them are puca picante, mondongo, qapchi, muyuchi and others. Puca picante is the city's main dish. It is a stew prepared with small potatoes, roasted and ground peanuts, pieces of pork and beets (which give it its reddish color, puka in Quechua), seasoned with red chili pepper and other condiments. Mondongo, also iconic to Ayacucho, is a mote soup that is cooked with beef, beef belly and pork belly. The particularity of the dish in Ayacucho is the addition of a seasoning of ground and toasted red chili pepper, along with chopped mint. Other dishes include pan chapla and Wawa's.

=== Sport ===
The city of Ayacucho has a district football and basketball league along with other sports leagues. One of the representative teams is the Ayacucho FC, which participates in the First Division of Peruvian football. Ayacucho has its own sports complex known as the Complejo Deportivo Ciudad de Caracas. Within the complex is the Estadio Ciudad de Cumaná, which was the largest stadium in the city with a capacity 12,000. The stadium and the sports complex was demolished in 2025 in order to create a new larger complex known as the Gran Complejo Deportivo Los Vencedores de Ayacucho. The new complex will include many new installations for sports such as basketball, volleyball, swimming, handball and others, along with a new stadium which will have a capacity of 20,000.

Ayacucho has hosted a number of sports tournaments, most notably the 2024 Bolivarian Games. The city will also host the next Bolivarian Games in 2025 with Lima, using its new sports infrastructure.

== Transport ==
=== Air ===
Coronel FAP Alfredo Mendívil Duarte Airport is the principal airport of Ayacucho. The airport provides daily domestic routes to cities such as Lima and Cusco. During Holy Week, the Municipality of Huamanga usually presents representative music and dance groups to welcome passengers at the airport terminal.

=== Road ===
The city of Ayacucho is a connection node for various national routes. It has three land passenger terminals.

== Notable people from Ayacucho ==
- María Parado de Bellido, heroine in War of Independence.
- Andrés Avelino Cáceres, President of Peru (1886–1890) and (1894–1895)
- Luis Guillermo Lumbreras, archaeologist.
- Alberto Arca Parró, economist and lawyer.
- Raúl García Zárate, guitarist.
- Renata Flores Rivera, singer

== See also ==
- Battle of Ayacucho
