= Atuq Wachana (Ayacucho) =

Mountain in Peru

- Location within Peru

Highest point
- Elevation: 4,000 m (13,000 ft)
- Coordinates: 13°32′59″S 74°32′24″W

Geography
- Location: Peru, Ayacucho Region, Cangallo Province
- Parent range: Andes

Atuq Wachana (Quechua atuq fox, wacha birth, to give birth, -na a suffix, "where the fox is born", erroneously also spelled Atcchuachana) is a mountain in the Andes of Peru, about 4,000 metres (13,123 ft) high. It is situated in the Ayacucho Region, Cangallo Province, Totos District, northwest of Totos.
