= Totos District =

Coordinates: 13.5679°S 74.5229°W

Totos
- District
- Interactive map of Totos
- Country: Peru
- Region: Ayacucho
- Province: Cangallo
- Capital: Totos

Government
  - Mayor: Teresa De La Cruz Licas

Area
  - Total: 112.9 km^{2} (43.6 sq mi)
- Elevation: 3,286 m (10,781 ft)

Population (2005 census)
  - Total: 4,415
  - Density: 39.11/km^{2} (101.3/sq mi)
- Time zone: UTC-5 (PET)
- UBIGEO: 050206

Totos District is one of six districts of the province Cangallo in Peru.

== Geography ==
One of the highest peaks of the district is Antap'iti at 4,410 m (14,470 ft). Other mountains are listed below:

- Atuq Wachana
- Chawpi Urqu
- Chukchu
- Huch'uy Puka Q'asa
- Kiswara
- Muqu Wasi
- P'iti Q'asa
- Qiñwa Urqu
- Q'iruni
- Runa Runa
- Turichayuq
- Uchku

The largest lakes in the district are Llulluch'a Qucha and Lawra Qucha.

== Ethnic groups ==
The people in the district are mainly indigenous citizens of Quechua descent. Quechua is the language which the majority of the population (94.28%) learnt to speak in childhood, 5.40% of the residents started speaking using the Spanish language (2007 Peru Census).
