= Huch'uy Puka Q'asa =

Mountain in Peru

- Location within Peru

Highest point
- Elevation: 4,400 m (14,400 ft)
- Coordinates: 13°33′18″S 74°29′19″W

Geography
- Location: Peru, Ayacucho Region, Cangallo Province
- Parent range: Andes

“‘Huch'uy Puka Q'asa’” (Quechua “huch'uy” little, “puka” red, “q'asa” mountain pass, meaning “little red pass”, also spelled “Uchuy Pucaccasa”) is a mountain in the Andes of Peru, about 4,400 metres (14,436 ft) high. It is situated in the Ayacucho Region, Cangallo Province, Totos District, northeast of Totos. Huch'uy Puka Q'asa lies south of Chawpi Urqu. The lake north of it is named Llulluchaqucha (Llullucha Ccocha).
