= Paras District =

Coordinates: 13.5524°S 74.6274°W

Paras
- District
- Interactive map of Paras
- Country: Peru
- Region: Ayacucho
- Province: Cangallo
- Capital: Paras

Government
  - Mayor: Luis Enriquez Jayo

Area
  - Total: 791.01 km^{2} (305.41 sq mi)
- Elevation: 3,330 m (10,930 ft)

Population (2005 census)
  - Total: 5,537
  - Density: 7.000/km^{2} (18.13/sq mi)
- Time zone: UTC-5 (PET)
- UBIGEO: 050205

Paras District is one of six districts of the province Cangallo in Peru.

== Geography ==
One of the highest mountains of the district is Chiqllarasu at 5,167 m (16,952 ft). Other mountains are listed below:

- Antap'iti
- Arpachayuq
- Asulqucha
- Ayapa Uman
- Ch'uspi
- Hatun Urqu
- Kawra Qaqa
- K'ichki
- Mach'ayniyuq

Manchaylla

- Machu Uqhu
- Millpu
- Misapata
- Pirwaylla
- Puka Kunka
- Puka Urqu
- Phutunqu
- Qarampa
- Qarwa Q'asa
- Q'illu Q'asa
- Rit'ipata
- Ruphasqa
- Saywa
- Saywa Q'asa
- Suyuqucha
- Tampuchayuq
- Taruka Punta
- Waranwallqa
- Wisk'acha Urqu
- Yana Chaka
- Yanaqucha
- Yawarqucha
- Yawlillayuq

== Ethnic groups ==
The people in the district are mainly indigenous citizens of Quechua descent. Quechua is the language which the majority of the population (85.65%) learnt to speak in childhood, 14.16% of the residents started speaking using the Spanish language (2007 Peru Census).
