= Chawpi Urqu (Cangallo) =

Mountain in Peru

- Location within Peru

Highest point
- Elevation: 4,400 m (14,400 ft)
- Coordinates: 13°32′27″S 74°29′34″W

Geography
- Location: Peru, Ayacucho Region, Cangallo Province
- Parent range: Andes

Chawpi Urqu (Quechua chawpi middle, center, urqu mountain, "middle mountain", Hispanicized spelling Chaupi Orjo) is a mountain in the Andes of Peru, about 4,400 metres (14,436 ft) high. It is situated in the Ayacucho Region, Cangallo Province, Totos District, northeast of Totos. Chawpi Urqu lies north of Huch'uy Puka Q'asa. The lake east of it is named Llulluchaqucha (Llullucha Ccocha).
