= Cangallo province =

Coordinates: 13.628658°S 74.144097°W

Cangallo
- Province
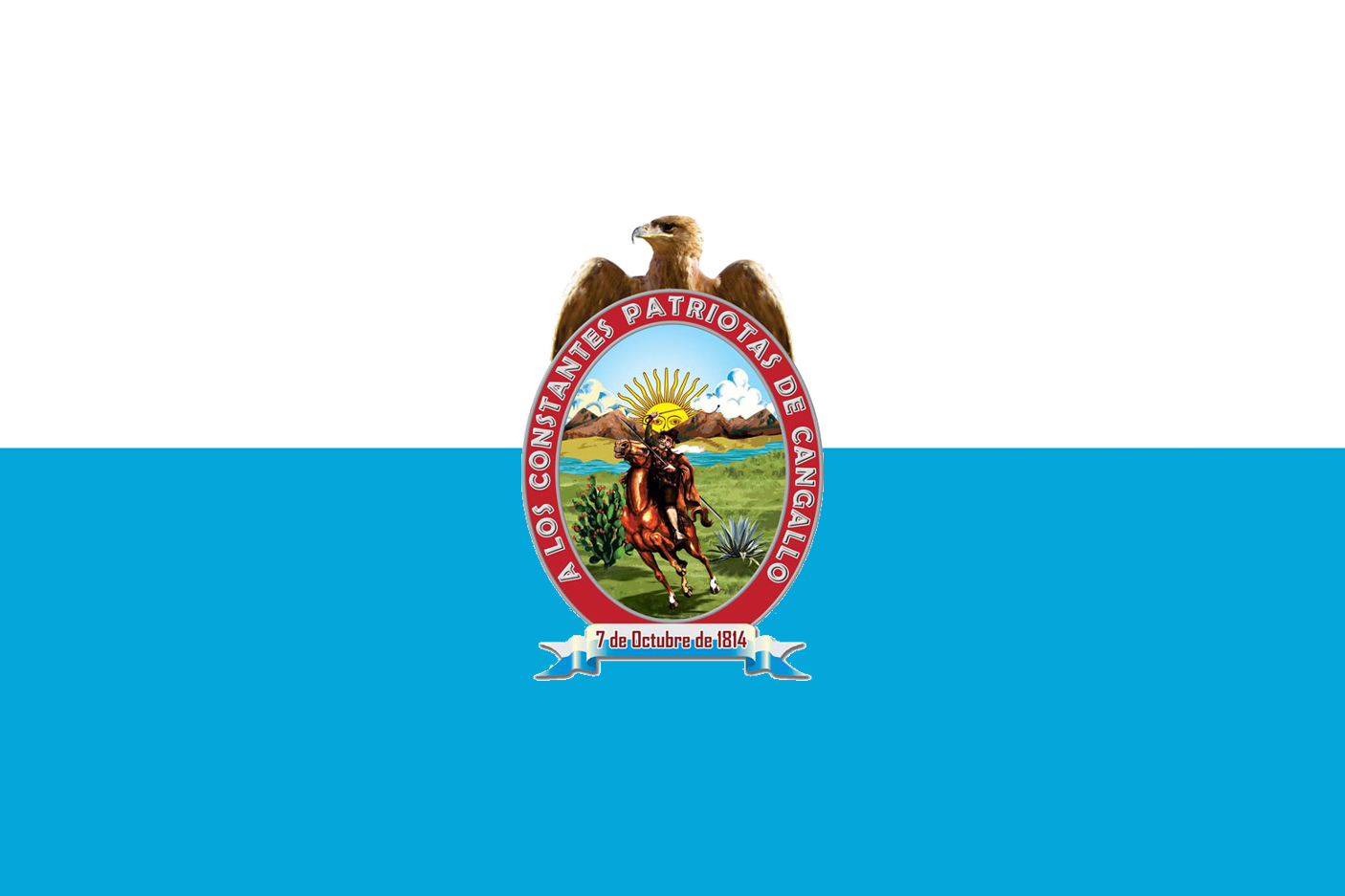
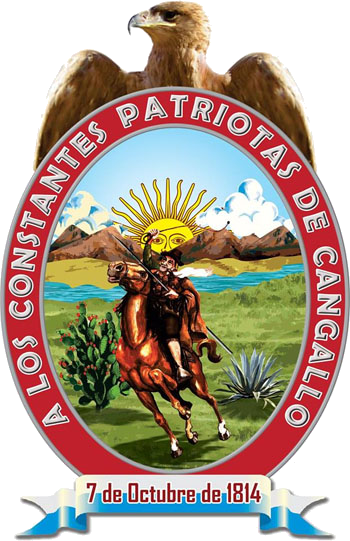
- Flag Coat of arms

- Location of Cangallo in the Ayacucho Region
- Country: Peru
- Region: Ayacucho
- Capital: Cangallo

Government
  - Mayor: Percy Colos Ayala

Area
  - Total: 1,916.17 km^{2} (739.84 sq mi)
- Elevation: 2,577 m (8,455 ft)

Population
  - Total: 36,977
  - Density: 19.297/km^{2} (49.980/sq mi)
- UBIGEO: 0502
- Website: http://www.municangallo.gob.pe/

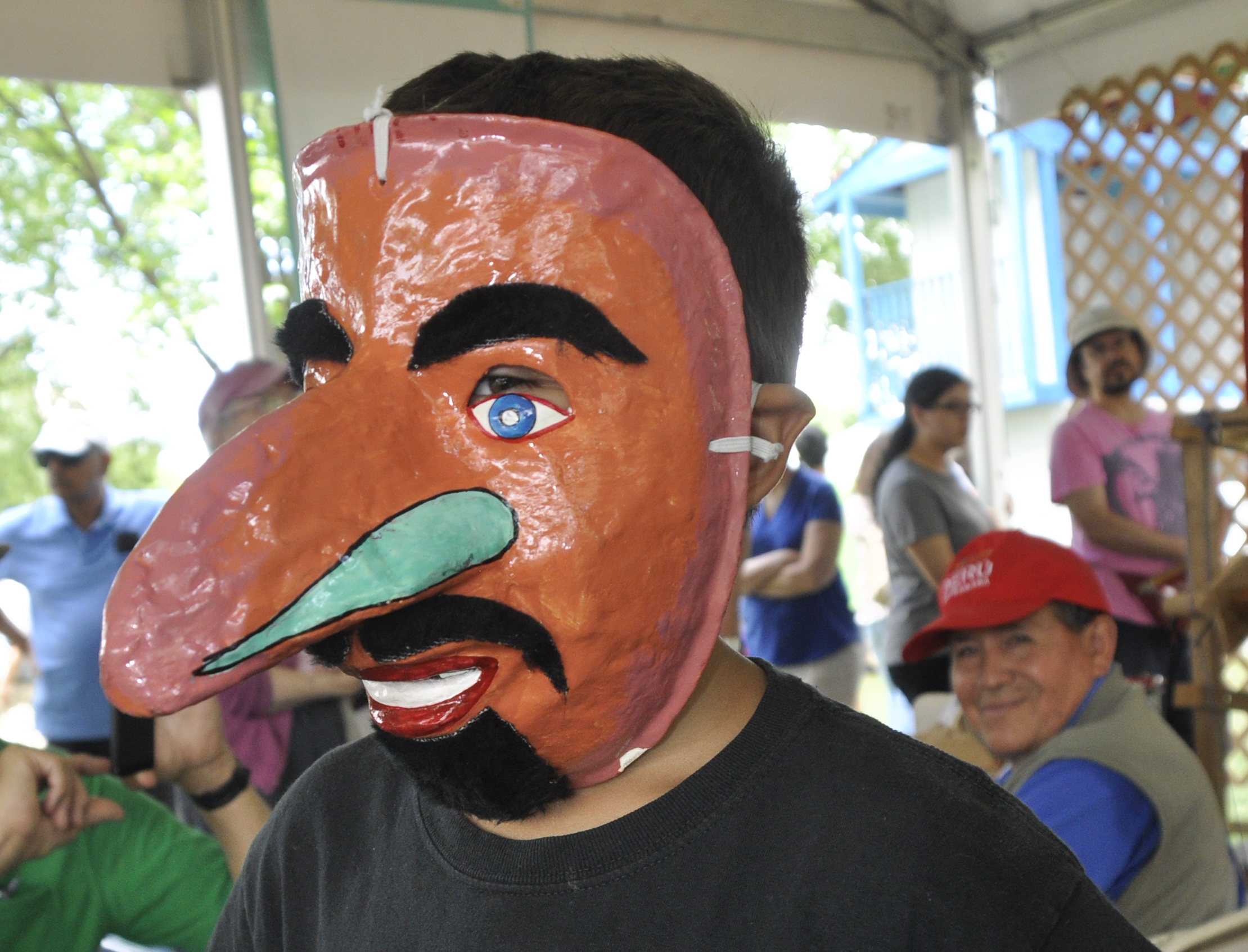
Mask from Cangallo province created for Three Kings Day (January 6), which are used by dance troupes who perform to celebrate Jesus’s birth. This mask was created from flour paste, sugar, and glue by mask maker Nilo Prado as part of 2015 Smithsonian Folklife Festival.

Cangallo is a province located in the Ayacucho Region of Peru. It is one of the eleven that make up the region. The province has a population of 36,977 inhabitants as of census 2005. The capital of the province is the city of Cangallo.

== Boundaries ==
- North: province of Huamanga
- East: province of Vilcas Huamán
- South: province of Víctor Fajardo
- West: Huancavelica Region

== Geography ==
One of the highest mountains of the province is Chiqllarasu at 5,167 m (16,952 ft). Other mountains are listed below:

- Anta Sirka
- Antap'iti
- Aqchi Mach'ay
- Arpachayuq
- Asulqucha
- Atuq Wachana
- Ayapa Uman
- Chaku
- Chawpi Urqu
- Ch'uspi
- Hatun Pata
- Hatun Urqu
- Hatun Qaqa
- Huch'uy Puka Q'asa
- Kawra Qaqa
- Kiswara
- Kuntur Q'asa
- K'ichki
- Mach'ayniyuq
- Machu Uqhu
- Millpu
- Misapata
- Pirwaylla
- Puka Kunka
- Puka Mach'ay
- Puka Urqu
- Phutunqu
- P'iti Q'asa
- P'ukru
- Qarampa
- Qarwa Q'asa
- Qullpa Pata
- Q'illu Q'asa
- Q'illu Wayta
- Rayusqa
- Rit'ipata
- Ruphasqa
- Sasaylla
- Saywa
- Saywa Q'asa
- Suyuqucha
- Tampuchayuq
- Taruka Punta
- Usnu
- Waranwallqa
- Waychaw Pata
- Wayra Punku
- Wisk'acha Urqu
- Yana Allpa
- Yana Chaka
- Yana Phiruru
- Yana Qaqa
- Yanaqucha
- Yawarqucha
- Yawlillayuq

== Political division ==
The province extends over an area of 1,916.17 square kilometers (739.84 sq mi) and is divided into six districts:

- Cangallo (Cangallo)
- Chuschi (Chuschi)
- Los Morochucos (Pampa Cangallo)
- María Parado de Bellido (Pomabamba)
- Paras (Paras)
- Totos (Totos)

== Ethnic groups ==
The people in the province are mainly indigenous citizens of Quechua descent. Quechua is the language which the majority of the population (90.14%) learnt to speak in childhood, 9.62% of the residents started speaking using the Spanish language (2007 Peru Census).

== Archaeology ==
Various archaeological sites of the province were declared a National Cultural Heritage. Some of the most important sites of the province are listed below:

- Anta Q'asa, Apachita Achamarka, Apachita Awqanqa, Apachita Manchayniyuq, Kunkachayuq, Llaqta Punta, Marka, Ñawpa Llaqta, Pirwaylla, Turichayuq, Wakuya, Waman Pukyu, Wantay Llamuqu, Waña Q'asa and Wichinka in the district of Paras
- Añas Qullpa, Kullku Wasi, Pillwa Pampa and Pisqu Pata in the district of Totos

== See also ==
- Yanaqucha
