= Hatun Wasi =

Mountain in Peru

- Location within Peru

Highest point
- Elevation: 3,800 m (12,500 ft)
- Coordinates: 13°43′07″S 73°31′25″W

Geography
- Location: Peru, Apurímac Region
- Parent range: Andes

Hatun Wasi (Quechua: hatun big (in Bolivia always jatun), wasi house, "big house", also spelled Jatun Huasi) is a mountain in Peru which reaches a height of approximately 3,800 m (12,500 ft). It is located in the Apurímac Region, Andahuaylas Province, on the border of the districts of Chicmo District and Huancaray.
