= Suqtaqucha =

Lake in Peru

- Location within Peru
- Location: Apurímac Region, Andahuaylas Province, Kishuara District
- Coordinates: 13°44′22″S 73°7′36″W
- Basin countries: Peru

Suqtaqucha (Quechua suqta six, qucha lake, "six lakes", hispanicized spelling Soctaccocha) is the name of a group of lakes in Peru. They are situated in the Apurímac Region, Andahuaylas Province, Kishuara District.

== See also ==
- Antaqucha
- List of lakes in Peru
- Quriqucha
- Wachuqucha
