= Chiriaco (Apurímac) =

Mountain in Peru

- Location within Peru

Highest point
- Elevation: 3,800 m (12,500 ft)
- Coordinates: 13°41′30″S 73°29′58″W

Geography
- Location: Peru, Apurímac Region
- Parent range: Andes

Chiriaco or Chiri Yaku (Quechua: chiri cold, yaku water, "cold water", also spelled Chiriaco) is a mountain in Peru which reaches a height of approximately 3,800 m (12,500 ft). It is located in the Apurímac Region, Andahuaylas Province, on the border of the districts of Chicmo District and Talavera.

Southwest of Chiri Yaku there is another mountain of that name (also spelled Chiriyacu or Chiviyacu). It lies on the border of the districts of Chicmo and Huancaray.
