= Inti Watana, Ayacucho =

Archaeological site in Peru

Coordinates: 13.5979°S 74.0115°W

Inti Watana
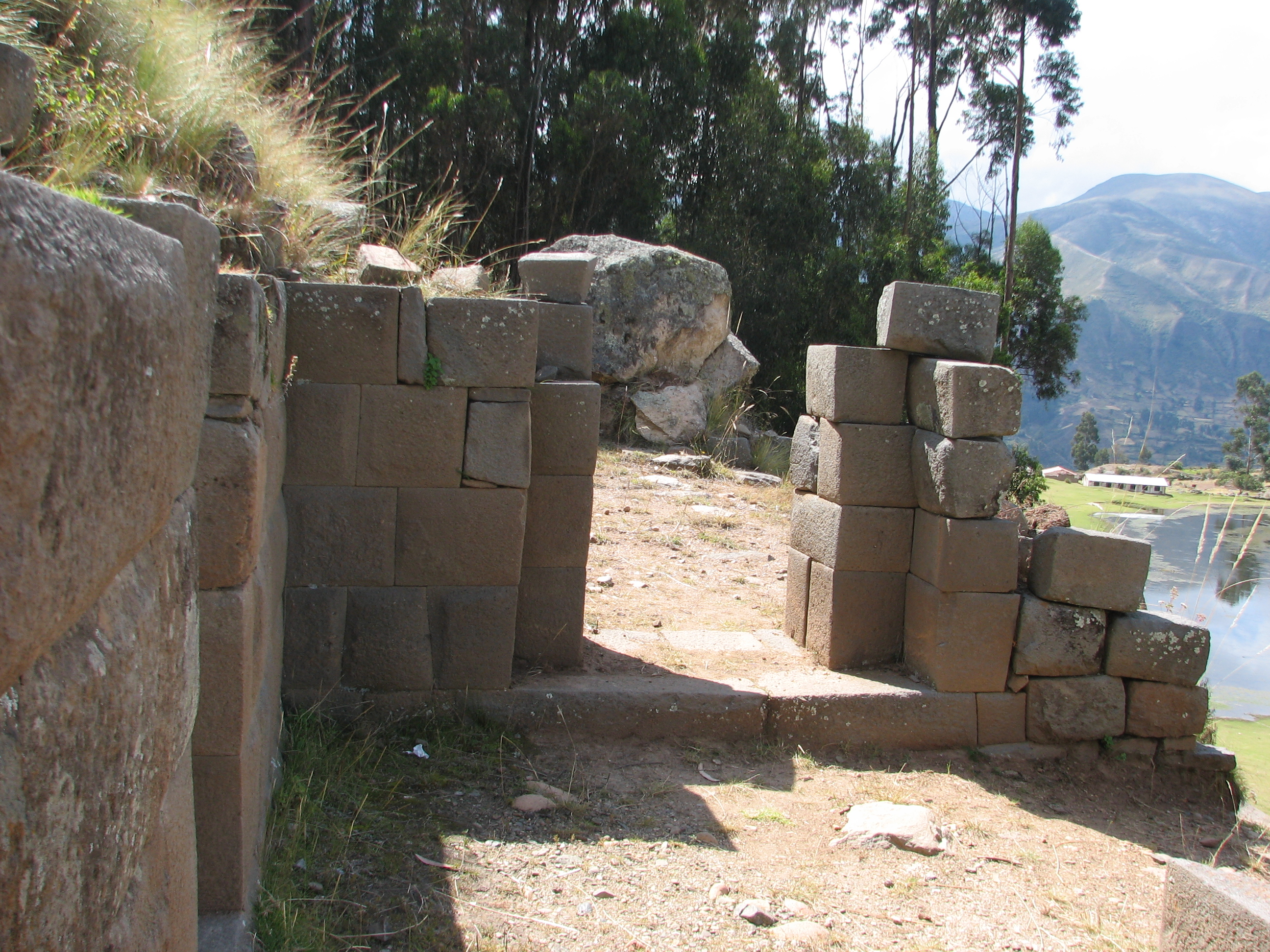
- The archaeological site Inti Watana at the lake Pumaqucha

- Location in Peru
- Type: Intihuatana
- Location: Peru
- Region: Ayacucho Region
- Part of: Intihuatana

Inti Watana, Intiwatana (Quechua, hispanicized spelling Intihuatana) or Pumaqucha (Quechua puma cougar, puma, qucha lake, "puma lake", hispanicized spellings Pomaccocha, Pomacocha, Pumacocha) is an archaeological site in Peru. It is located in the Ayacucho Region, Vilcas Huamán Province, Vischongo District, at the lake Pumaqucha (3,126 metres (10,256 ft)).

The site was declared a National Cultural Heritage of Peru by Resolución Directoral No. Nº 751/INC on July 27, 2001 .

== See also ==
- Usnu
- Titankayuq
