= Lake Pomacocha (Ayacucho) =

Lake in Peru

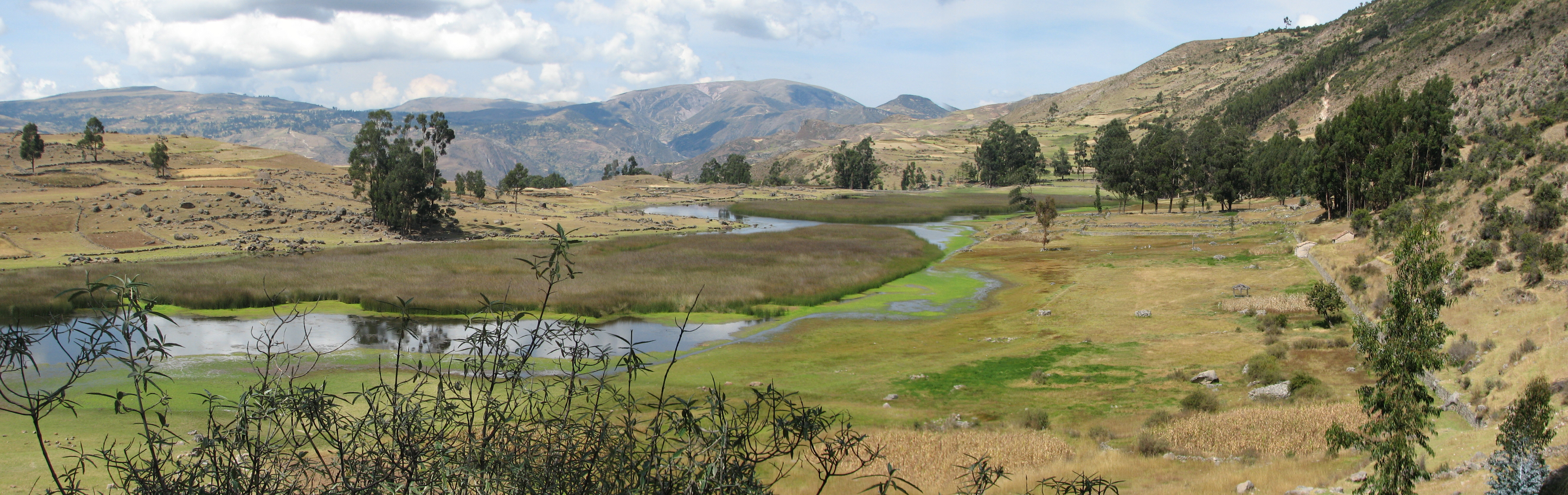

- Location within Peru
- Location: Ayacucho Region
- Coordinates: 13°35′58″S 74°00′45″W
- Basin countries: Peru
- Max. length: 0.86 km (0.53 mi)
- Max. width: 0.17 km (0.11 mi)
- Surface elevation: 3,300 m (10,800 ft)

Lake Pomacocha (possibly from Quechua puma cougar, puma, qucha lake, "puma lake") is a lake in Peru located in the Ayacucho Region, Vilcas Huamán Province. at a height of about 3,300 m. It is situated southwest of the town of Vischongo. Pomacocha is 0.86 km long and 0.17 km at its widest point. The archaeological site called Inti Watana or Pomacocha lies at its shore.

== See also ==
- List of lakes in Peru
- Titankayuq
- Usnu
