= Talavera =

Talavera may refer to:

== Battles ==
- Battle of Talavera de la Reina, Spain, an 1809 battle of the Peninsular War
- Battle of Talavera de la Reina (1936), during the Spanish Civil War

== People ==
- Talavera (surname), list of people with this name
- Talavera Vernon Anson (1809–1895), Royal Navy Admiral

== Places ==
- Talavera District, a district in Andahuaylas, Peru
- Talavera, Nueva Ecija, a municipality in Nueva Ecija, Philippines
- Talavera de la Reina, a municipality of the province of Toledo, Castilla–La Mancha, Spain
- Talavera la Nueva, an EATIM part of the municipality of Talavera de la Reina
- Talavera la Real, a municipality in Badajoz, Extremadura, Spain
- Talavera, Lleida, a municipality in Segarra, Catalonia, Spain

== Sports ==
- Talavera CF, an association football club based in Talavera de la Reina, active 1948–2010
- Talavera FS, a futsal club based in Talavera de la Reina, founded 1990
- UD Talavera, an association football club based in Talavera de la Reina, founded 1993

== Pottery ==
- Artisanal Talavera of Puebla and Tlaxcala, a Mexican pottery tradition
- Talavera de la Reina pottery, a Spanish pottery tradition

== Other uses ==
- The Battles of Talavera, an 1809 poem by John Wilson Croker
- HMS Talavera (1818), a Royal Navy ship in service 1818–1840
- Talavera (gymnastics), a balance beam move named after Tracee Talavera
- Talavera (spider), a genus of jumping spiders
