= Wachuqucha (Apurímac) =

Lake in Peru

- Location within Peru
- Location: Apurímac Region, Andahuaylas Province, San Jerónimo District
- Coordinates: 13°48′25″S 73°13′25″W
- Basin countries: Peru

Wachuqucha (Quechua wachu furrow slice, ridge turned up by the plough between two furrows / row, qucha lake, hispanicized spellings Huachoccocha) is a lake in Peru. It is situated in the Apurímac Region, Andahuaylas Province, San Jerónimo District. Wachuqucha lies northeast of the lakes Suytuqucha and Quriqucha, and south of the lake Antaqucha.

== See also ==
- List of lakes in Peru
