= Vischongo District =

Coordinates: 13.5892°S 74.0018°W

Vischongo
- District
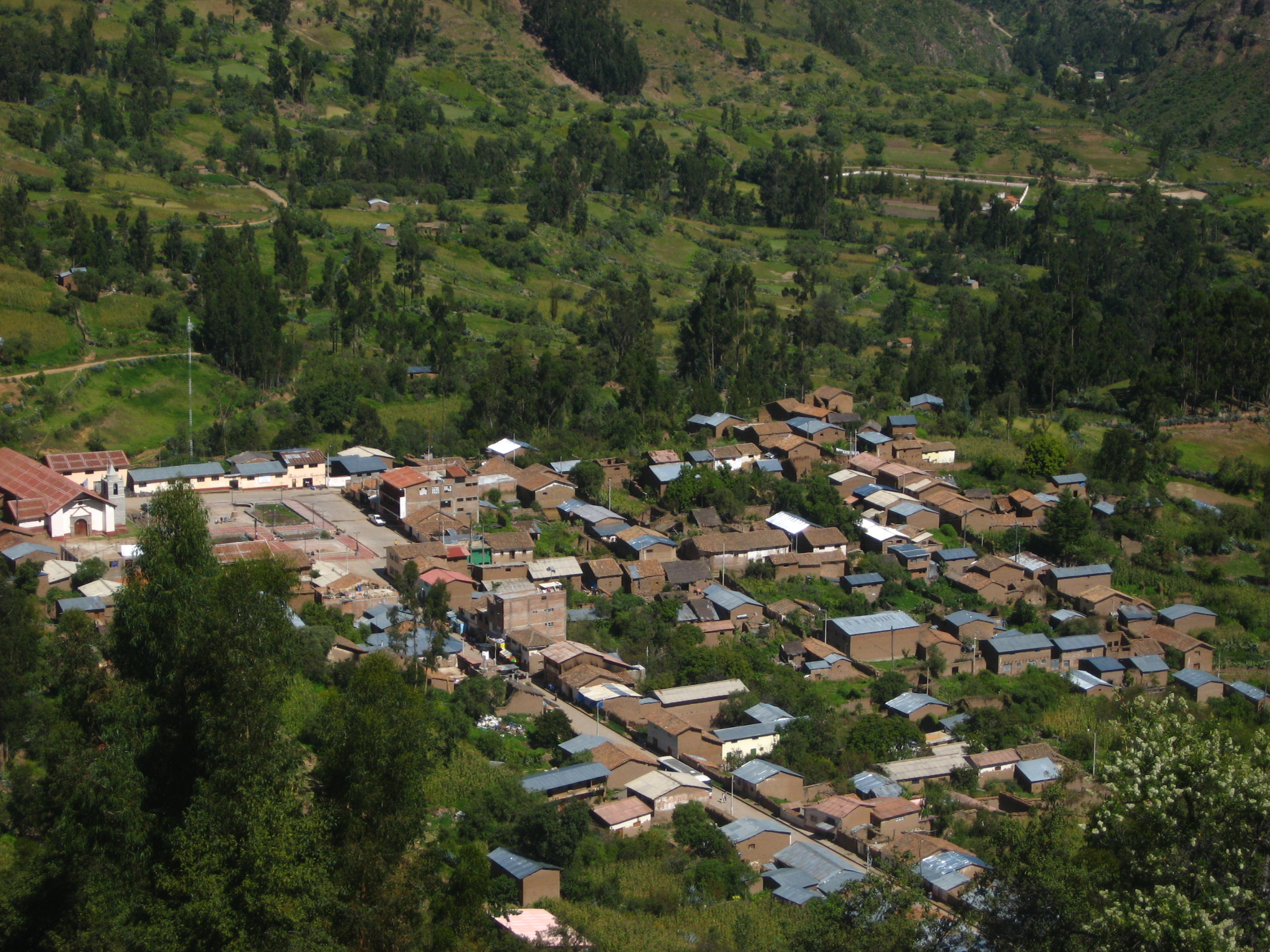
- Vischongo
- Interactive map of Vischongo
- Country: Peru
- Region: Ayacucho
- Province: Vilcas Huamán
- Capital: Vischongo

Area
  - Total: 247.55 km^{2} (95.58 sq mi)
- Elevation: 3,126 m (10,256 ft)

Population (2005 census)
  - Total: 4,625
  - Density: 18.68/km^{2} (48.39/sq mi)
- Time zone: UTC-5 (PET)
- UBIGEO: 051108

Vischongo District is one of eight districts of the Vilcas Huamán Province in Peru.

== Geography ==
One of the highest mountains of the district is Hatun Rumi at approximately 4,200 m (13,800 ft). Other mountains are listed below:

- Amaru Q'asa
- Aqchip Wachanan
- Chuku
- Parqa Qaqa
- Puka Ranra
- Qillqa P'iti
- Qutu Q'asa
- Saywa
- Suqlla Raqay
- Urqu Tuna
- Waraqu
- Wasiyuq P'ukru
- Yana Mach'ay

== Ethnic groups ==
The people in the district are mainly indigenous citizens of Quechua descent (mostly Chanka). Quechua is the language which the majority of the population (83.00%) learnt to speak in childhood, 16.54% of the residents started speaking using the Spanish language (2007 Peru Census).

== See also ==
- Inti Watana
- Pumaqucha
- Titankayuq
