= Tumay =

Tumay is a given name and surname. Notable people with the name include:

- Alex Tumay (born 1986), American audio engineer and DJ

== See also ==
- Tumay Huaraca District in Peru
