= WAMP (disambiguation) =

WAMP ("Windows, Apache, MySQL, and PHP") is an application server platform.

WAMP or Wamp may also refer to:

- WAMP (FM), a radio station (88.1 FM) licensed to Jackson, Tennessee, United States
- Web Application Messaging Protocol, a network protocol
- Zach Wamp, Republican politician representing the 3rd Congressional district of Tennessee
- Braintree Wamps, the team name of Braintree High School

== See also ==
- "Wamp Wamp (What It Do)", a 2006 song by Clipse from Hell Hath No Fury
- Wamp'u (disambiguation)
