= Quriqucha (Apurímac) =

Lake in Peru

- Location within Peru
- Location: Apurímac Region, Andahuaylas Province, San Jerónimo District
- Coordinates: 13°48′41″S 73°14′5″W
- Basin countries: Peru

Quriqucha (Quechua quri gold, qucha lake, "gold lake", Hispanicized spelling Ccoricocha) is a lake in Peru. It is situated in the Apurímac Region, Andahuaylas Province, San Jerónimo District. Quriqucha lies southwest of the lakes Antaqucha and Wachuqucha, and northeast of the lake Suyt'uqucha.

== See also ==
- List of lakes in Peru
