= Huampo (Apurímac) =

Mountain in Peru

- Location within Peru

Highest point
- Elevation: 4,000 m (13,000 ft)
- Coordinates: 13°45′40″S 73°35′10″W

Geography
- Location: Peru, Apurímac Region
- Parent range: Andes

Huampo or Wamp'u (Quechua for boat, also spelled Huampo) is a mountain in Peru which reaches a height of approximately 4,000 m (13,000 ft). It is located in the Apurímac Region, Andahuaylas Province, on the border of the districts of Cachi District and Huancaray.
