= Pilluchu =

Archaeological site in Peru

- Interactive map of Pilluchu
- 13°41′03″S 73°58′53″W
- Location: Peru, Ayacucho Region
- Region: Andes

Site notes
- Height: 3,800 metres (12,467 ft)

Pilluchu (also spelled Pillucho) is an archaeological site in the Ayacucho Region in Peru on top of a mountain of the same name. It lies in the Vilcas Huamán Province, Vilcas Huamán District, southwest of Vilcashuamán. It is situated at a height of about 3,800 m (12,467 ft).
