= Pomacocha District, Andahuaylas =

Coordinates: 14°05′02″S 73°35′20″W

Pomacocha Pumaqucha
- District
- Interactive map of Pomacocha; Pumaqucha
- Country: Peru
- Region: Apurímac
- Province: Andahuaylas
- Founded: August 21, 1963
- Capital: Pomacocha

Government
  - Mayor: Abelardo Ccaccya Ccopa

Area
  - Total: 129.19 km^{2} (49.88 sq mi)
- Elevation: 3,643 m (11,952 ft)

Population (2005 census)
  - Total: 1,128
  - Density: 8.731/km^{2} (22.61/sq mi)
- Time zone: UTC-5 (PET)
- UBIGEO: 030211

Pomacocha District is one of the nineteen districts of the Andahuaylas Province in Peru.

== Geography ==
One of the highest peaks of the district is Chhurku Rumi at approximately 4,400 m (14,400 ft). Other mountains are listed below:

- Awkimarka
- Ch'aki Qucha Pata
- Jichu Q'awa
- Illa Pata
- Karpa Q'asa
- Wamani
- Wamanniyuq
- Willkawani
- Wit'u
- Yana Pata
- Yuraq Q'asa

== Ethnic groups ==
The people in the district are mainly indigenous citizens of Quechua descent. Quechua is the language which the majority of the population (86.62%) learnt to speak in childhood, 12.83% of the residents started speaking using the Spanish language (2007 Peru Census).

== Archaeology ==
The archaeological site of Awkimarka contains ruins of the Chanka period.
