= Pacocha =

Pacocha (cocha=lake) may refer to

- BAP Pacocha (SS-48)
- Pacocha District, Moquegua Region, Peru
- Battle of Pacocha (1877)

== See also ==
- Pacucha District, Apurímac Region, Peru
