= Vilcas Huamán province =

Coordinates: 13.65311°S 73.95396°W

Vilcas Huamán
- Province
- Location of Vilcas Huamán in the Ayacucho Region
- Country: Peru
- Region: Ayacucho
- Founded: September 24, 1984
- Capital: Vilcashuamán

Government
  - Mayor: José Luis Delgado Palomino (2007-10)

Area
  - Total: 1,178.16 km^{2} (454.89 sq mi)
- Elevation: 3,470 m (11,380 ft)

Population
  - Total: 33,661
  - Density: 28.571/km^{2} (73.998/sq mi)
- Website: www.munivilcas.gob.pe

Vilcas Huamán (from Quechua Willka Waman) is a province located in the eastern part of the Ayacucho Region in Peru.

== Boundaries ==
- North: Huamanga province
- East: Apurímac Region
- South: Sucre province
- West: Cangallo province and Víctor Fajardo province

== Geography ==
One of the highest mountains of the province is Hatun Rumi at approximately 4,200 m (13,800 ft). Other mountains are listed below:

- Amaru Q'asa
- Anta Qaqa
- Aqchip Wachanan
- Artisarayuq
- Awkillana
- Chawpi Qhata
- Chinchi Q'asa
- Chuku
- Chumpiq
- Hatun
- Hatun Tarayuq
- Kunturchayuq
- Maknu Q'asa
- Muyu Muyu
- Muyu Urqu
- Parqa Qaqa
- Pata Kancha
- Pilluchu
- Puka Q'asa
- Puka Ranra
- Pukara
- Puntay Urqu
- P'unqu Pata
- Qarawiq Rumi
- Qillqa P'iti
- Qullpa Muqu
- Qutu Pukyu
- Qutu Q'asa
- Q'asa Ñawin
- Ranra
- Rimana Urqu
- Saywa
- Saywa Muqu
- Suqlla Raqay
- Tiklla Rasu
- Tuna Pata
- Urqu Pata
- Urqu Tuna
- Urqun Wasi
- Wallwa Urqu
- Wanakawri
- Waraqu
- Wasiyuq P'ukru
- Wayra Q'asa
- Waywana
- Yaku Sut'uy
- Yana Mach'ay
- Yana Qucha
- Yuraq Pata

== Political division ==
The province is divided into eight districts (Spanish: distritos, singular: distrito), each of which is headed by a mayor (alcalde). The districts, with their capitals in parentheses, are:

- Vilcas Huamán (Vilcashuamán)
- Accomarca (Accomarca)
- Carhuanca
- Concepción
- Huambalpa
- Independencia
- Saurama
- Vischongo (Vischongo)

== Ethnic groups ==
The people in the province are primarily indigenous citizens of Quechua descent. Quechua is the language which the majority of the population (89.62%) learned to speak in childhood, 10.06% of the residents started speaking using the Spanish language (2007 Peru Census).

== Archaeology ==
Some of the most important archaeological sites in the province are Usnu, Inti Watana, Pilluchu, Pukara and Puntay Urqu.

== See also ==
- Pumaqucha
- Titankayuq
