= Yupanqui =

Yupanqui is a surname. Notable people with the surname include:

- Amaru Yupanqui, elder brother of Túpac Inca Yupanqui
- Atahualpa Yupanqui (1908–1992), Argentine singer, songwriter, guitarist, and writer
- Cápac Yupanqui, the fifth Sapa Inca of the Kingdom of Cuzco (beginning around CE 1320) and the last of the Hurin dynasty
- Francisco Tito Yupanqui (1550–1616), Roman Catholic sculptor, created a famous statue of the Blessed Virgin Mary in Bolivia
- Gastón Mansilla Yupanqui, (born 1990), student who killed Víctor Ríos Acevedo in 2012 in Lima, Peru
- Lloque Yupanqui, the third Sapa Inca of the Kingdom of Cuzco (beginning around CE 1260) and a member of the Hurin dynasty
- Manco Inca Yupanqui (1516–1544), one of the Incas of Vilcabamba
- Pachacuti Inca Yupanqui, alias Pachakutiq, the ninth Sapa Inca (1438–1471/1472 CE)
- Titu Cusi Yupanqui (1529–1571), son of Manco Inca Yupanqui, became Inca ruler of Vilcabamba
- Túpac Inca Yupanqui the tenth Sapa Inca (1471–93 CE) of the Inca Empire, and fifth of the Hanan dynasty, younger son and successor of Pachacuti Inca Yupanqui
- Luca Yupanqui, musical contributor to the album Sounds of the Unborn

== See also ==
- Club Social y Deportivo Yupanqui, Argentine football (soccer) club
- Tito Yupanqui, Bolivia, town in the La Paz Department, Bolivia
- Tito Yupanqui Municipality, the third municipal section of the Manco Kapac Province in the La Paz Department, Bolivia
