= Concepción District, Vilcas Huamán =

Coordinates: 13.5328°S 73.8751°W

Concepción District
- District
- Interactive map of Concepción District
- Country: Peru
- Region: Ayacucho
- Province: Vilcas Huamán
- Founded: November 19, 1954
- Capital: Concepción

Area
  - Total: 243.19 km^{2} (93.90 sq mi)
- Elevation: 3,050 m (10,010 ft)

Population (2005 census)
  - Total: 3,291
  - Density: 13.53/km^{2} (35.05/sq mi)
- Time zone: UTC-5 (PET)
- UBIGEO: 051104

Concepción District is one of eight districts of the province Vilcas Huamán in Peru.

== Ethnic groups ==
The people in the district are mainly indigenous citizens of Quechua descent. Quechua is the language which the majority of the population (93.89%) learnt to speak in childhood, 5.74% of the residents started speaking using the Spanish language (2007 Peru Census).

== See also ==
- Pukara
