= Independencia District, Vilcas Huamán =

Coordinates: 13.9079°S 73.8631°W

Independencia District
- District
- Interactive map of Independencia District
- Country: Peru
- Region: Ayacucho
- Province: Vilcas Huamán
- Founded: March 12, 1986
- Capital: Paccha Huallhua

Area
  - Total: 85.28 km^{2} (32.93 sq mi)
- Elevation: 2,950 m (9,680 ft)

Population (2005 census)
  - Total: 2,118
  - Density: 24.84/km^{2} (64.32/sq mi)
- Time zone: UTC-5 (PET)
- UBIGEO: 051106

Independencia District is one of eight districts of the province Vilcas Huamán in Peru.

== Ethnic groups ==
The people in the district are mainly indigenous citizens of Quechua descent. Quechua is the language which the majority of the population (93.44%) learnt to speak in childhood, 6.27% of the residents started speaking using the Spanish language (2007 Peru Census).
