= Saurama District =

Coordinates: 13.6410°S 73.8767°W

Saurama Sawrama
- District
- Interactive map of Saurama
- Country: Peru
- Region: Ayacucho
- Province: Vilcas Huamán
- Founded: February 19, 1986
- Capital: Saurama

Area
  - Total: 95.15 km^{2} (36.74 sq mi)
- Elevation: 3,540 m (11,610 ft)

Population (2005 census)
  - Total: 1,703
  - Density: 17.90/km^{2} (46.36/sq mi)
- Time zone: UTC-5 (PET)
- UBIGEO: 051107

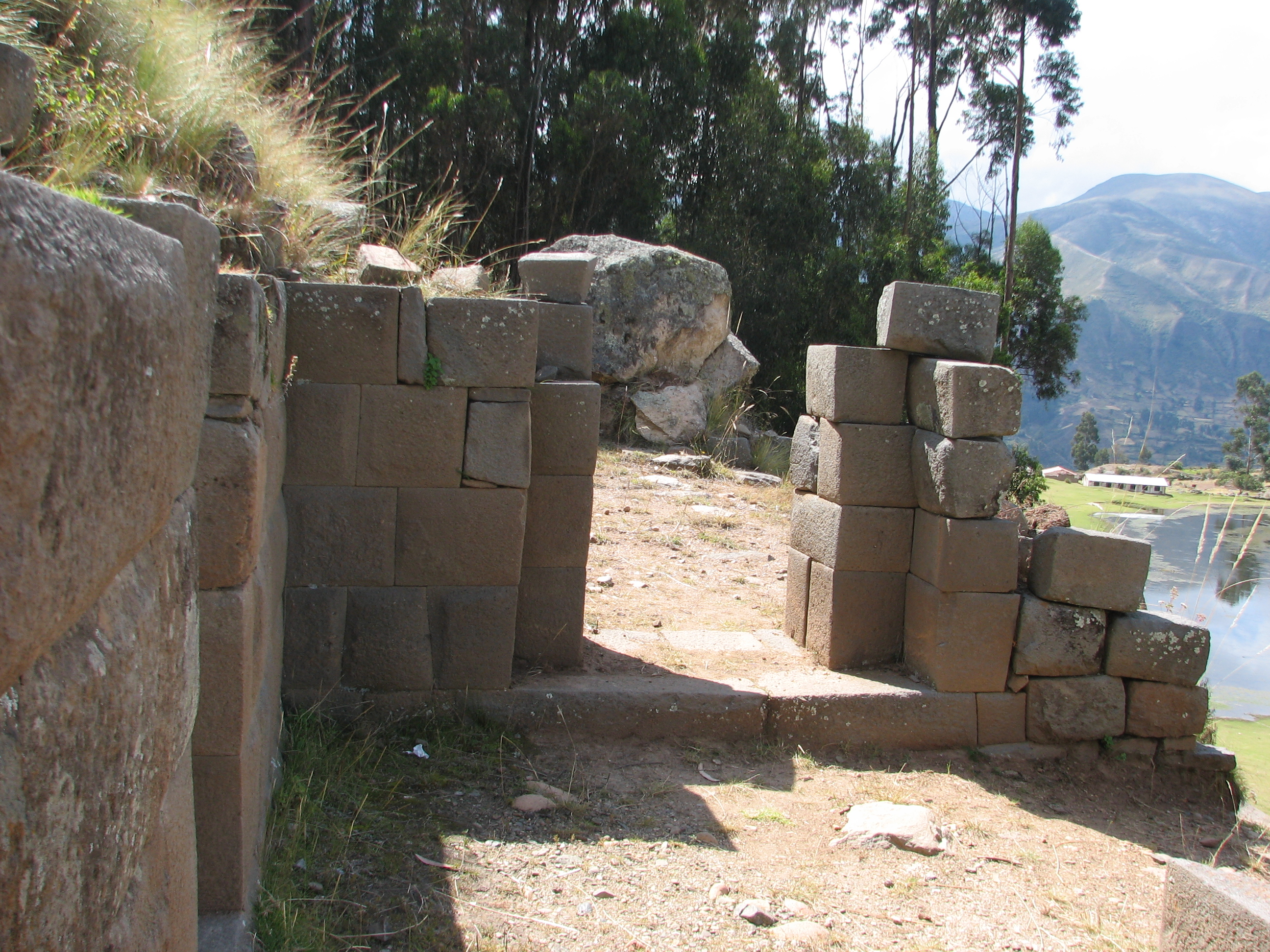
Ruins of a doorway in The Pumacocha Archaeological (Saurama District)

Saurama District is one of eight districts of the province Vilcas Huamán in Peru.

== Ethnic groups ==
The people in the district are mainly indigenous citizens of Quechua descent. Quechua is the language which the majority of the population (96.32%) learnt to speak in childhood, 3.68% of the residents started speaking using the Spanish language (2007 Peru Census).
