= Pukara, Vilcas Huamán =

Archaeological site in Peru

Pukara
- Location: Peru, Ayacucho Region
- Region: Andes

Site notes
- Height: 3,700 metres (12,139 ft)

Pukara (Quechua for fortress) is an archaeological site in Peru located in the Ayacucho Region, Vilcas Huaman Province, in the south of the Concepción District, near Antap'iti (Antapite). It is situated at a height of about 3,700 metres (12,139 ft) on top of the mountain Pukara (Pucará). This place is also interesting as a natural viewpoint.
