= Accomarca District =

Coordinates: 13.8105°S 73.8688°W

Accomarca Aqumarka
- District
- Interactive map of Accomarca
- Country: Peru
- Region: Ayacucho
- Province: Vilcas Huamán
- Founded: January 29, 1965
- Capital: Accomarca

Area
  - Total: 82.43 km^{2} (31.83 sq mi)
- Elevation: 3,351 m (10,994 ft)

Population (2005 census)
  - Total: 1,836
  - Density: 22.27/km^{2} (57.69/sq mi)
- Time zone: UTC-5 (PET)
- UBIGEO: 051102

Accomarca District is one of eight districts of the province Vilcas Huamán in Peru.

== Ethnic groups ==
The people in the district are mainly indigenous citizens of Quechua descent. Quechua is the language which the majority of the population (95.64%) learnt to speak in childhood, 4.13% of the residents started speaking using the Spanish language (2007 Peru Census).
