= Chiara District, Andahuaylas =

Coordinates: 13°52′19″S 73°40′12″W

Chiara Ch'iyara
- District
- Interactive map of Chiara
- Country: Peru
- Region: Apurímac
- Province: Andahuaylas
- Founded: April 5, 1935

Government
  - Mayor: Gabino Cartolin Altamirano

Area
  - Total: 148.92 km^{2} (57.50 sq mi)
- Elevation: 3,270 m (10,730 ft)

Population (2005 census)
  - Total: 1,623
  - Density: 10.90/km^{2} (28.23/sq mi)
- Time zone: UTC-5 (PET)
- UBIGEO: 030203

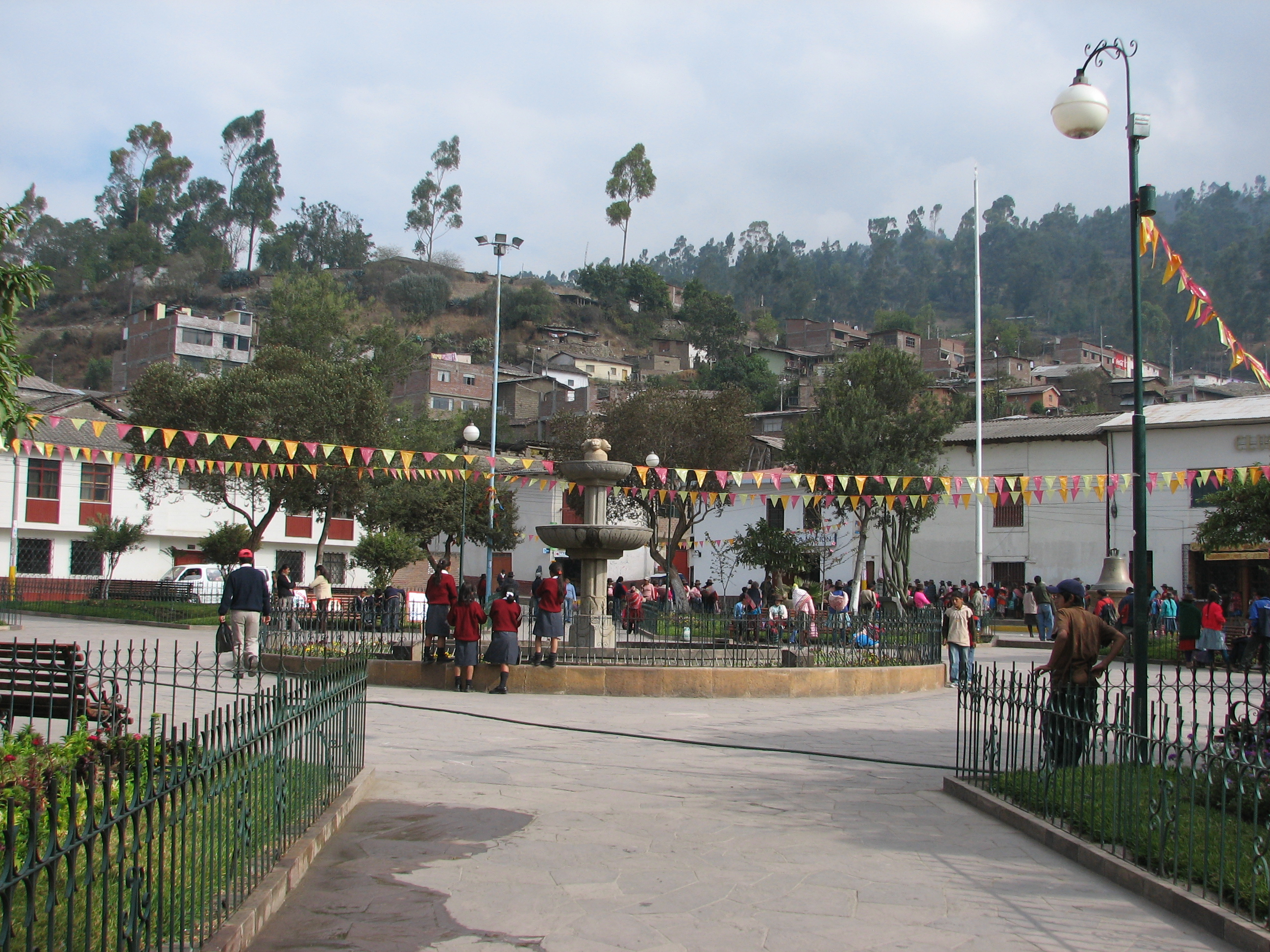

Chiara District is one of the nineteen districts of the province Andahuaylas in Peru.

== Ethnic groups ==
The people in the district are mainly indigenous citizens of Quechua descent. Quechua is the language which the majority of the population (96.79%) learnt to speak in childhood, 3.05% of the residents started speaking using the Spanish language (2007 Peru Census).
