= Huayana District =

Coordinates: 14°02′54″S 73°36′35″W

Huayana
- District
- Interactive map of Huayana
- Country: Peru
- Region: Apurímac
- Province: Andahuaylas
- Founded: October 30, 1984
- Capital: Huayana

Government
  - Mayor: Hermelinda Pareja Urpi

Area
  - Total: 96.87 km^{2} (37.40 sq mi)
- Elevation: 3,150 m (10,330 ft)

Population (2005 census)
  - Total: 1,280
  - Density: 13.2/km^{2} (34.2/sq mi)
- Time zone: UTC-5 (PET)
- UBIGEO: 030206

Huayana District is one of the nineteen districts of the Andahuaylas Province in Peru.

== Geography ==
One of the highest peaks of the district is Qucha Urqu at approximately 4,200 m (13,800 ft). Other mountains are listed below:

- Chipana Wayq'u
- Puma Pukyu
- Qillqata Urqu
- Sach'a P'ukru
- Silla Q'asa

== Ethnic groups ==
The people in the district are mainly indigenous citizens of Quechua descent. Quechua is the language which the majority of the population (86.11%) learnt to speak in childhood, 13.67% of the residents started speaking using the Spanish language (2007 Peru Census).
