= Turpo District =

Coordinates: 13°47′13″S 73°28′19″W

Turpo T'urpu
- District
- Interactive map of Turpo
- Country: Peru
- Region: Apurímac
- Province: Andahuaylas
- Founded: December 11, 1942
- Capital: Turpo

Government
  - Mayor: Antonio Beltran Sanchez

Area
  - Total: 121.67 km^{2} (46.98 sq mi)
- Elevation: 3,297 m (10,817 ft)

Population (2005 census)
  - Total: 4,514
  - Density: 37.10/km^{2} (96.09/sq mi)
- Time zone: UTC-5 (PET)
- UBIGEO: 030218

Turpo (from Quechua T'urpu, meaning "pointed") is one of the nineteen districts of the Andahuaylas Province in Peru.

== Geography ==
It is elevated at 3,297 m above sea level. One of the highest peaks of the district is Pisti at approximately 4,200 m (13,800 ft). Other mountains are listed below:

- Anta Qaqa
- Apankayniyuq
- Illa Rumi
- Liq'i Yakana Pampa
- Qucha Pampa

== Ethnic groups ==
The people in the district are mainly indigenous citizens of Quechua descent. Quechua is the language which the majority of the population (95.22%) learnt to speak in childhood, 4.57% of the residents started speaking using the Spanish language (2007 Peru Census).
