= Pacobamba District =

Coordinates: 13°31′01″S 72°48′00″W

Pacobamba
- District
- Interactive map of Pacobamba
- Country: Peru
- Region: Apurímac
- Province: Andahuaylas
- Founded: January 20, 1944
- Capital: Pacobamba

Government
  - Mayor: Efren Huarancca Urquizo

Area
  - Total: 245.9 km^{2} (94.9 sq mi)
- Elevation: 2,720 m (8,920 ft)

Population (2005 census)
  - Total: 5,962
  - Density: 24.25/km^{2} (62.80/sq mi)
- Time zone: UTC-5 (PET)
- UBIGEO: 030208

Pacobamba District is one of the nineteen districts of the province Andahuaylas in Peru.

== Ethnic groups ==
The people in the district are mainly indigenous citizens of Quechua descent. Quechua is the language which the majority of the population (90.85%) learnt to speak in childhood, 8.80% of the residents started speaking using the Spanish language (2007 Peru Census).
