= San Antonio de Cachi District =

Coordinates: 13°46′30″S 73°36′14″W

San Antonio de Cachi Kachi
- District
- Interactive map of San Antonio de Cachi
- Country: Peru
- Region: Apurímac
- Province: Andahuaylas
- Founded: June 8, 1936
- Capital: San Antonio de Cachi

Government
  - Mayor: Esteban Astuquillca Arcce

Area
  - Total: 178.78 km^{2} (69.03 sq mi)
- Elevation: 3,250 m (10,660 ft)

Population (2005 census)
  - Total: 3,547
  - Density: 19.84/km^{2} (51.39/sq mi)
- Time zone: UTC-5 (PET)
- UBIGEO: 030212

San Antonio de Cachi or Kachi (Quechua for "salt") is one of the nineteen districts of the Andahuaylas Province in Peru.

== Geography ==
One of the highest peaks of the district is Kuntur Wachana at approximately 4,200 m (13,800 ft). Other mountains are listed below:

- Artisayuq
- Chikchi
- Chikuruyuq
- Chunta
- Kunturillu
- Qillqa
- Quchayuq
- Ranra Urqu
- Sullka Willka
- Suwap Tiyana
- Uchku
- Wamp'u
- Wayllachayuq

== Ethnic groups ==
The people in the district are mainly indigenous citizens of Quechua descent. Quechua is the language which the majority of the population (94.41%) learnt to speak in childhood, 5.22% of the residents started speaking using the Spanish language (2007 Peru Census).
