= Puntay Urqu =

Archaeological site in Peru

- Location within Peru

Highest point
- Elevation: 3,267 m (10,719 ft)
- Coordinates: 13°45′59″S 73°48′08″W

Naming
- Language of name: Quechua

Geography
- Location: Peru, Ayacucho Region, Vilcas Huamán Province
- Parent range: Andes

Puntay Urqu (Quechua) is a mountain and an archaeological site in Peru located in the Ayacucho Region, Vilcas Huamán Province, Carhuanca District. It lies between the villages Hanan Raymi (Rayme Alto) and Urpaypukyu (Urpaypuquio). Puntay Urqu is situated at a height of about 3,267 metres (10,719 ft). The place is also visited as a viewpoint.
