= Quchayuq (Apurímac) =

Mountain in Peru

- Location within Peru

Highest point
- Elevation: 3,600 m (11,800 ft)
- Coordinates: 13°46′21″S 73°40′47″W

Geography
- Location: Peru, Apurímac Region
- Parent range: Andes

Quchayuq (Quechua qucha lake, -yuq a suffix, "the one with a lake (or lakes)", also spelled Jochajoi) is a mountain in Peru which reaches a height of approximately 3,600 m (11,800 ft). It is located in the Apurímac Region, Andahuaylas Province, Cachi District.
