= Chanka =

Indigenous people of Peru

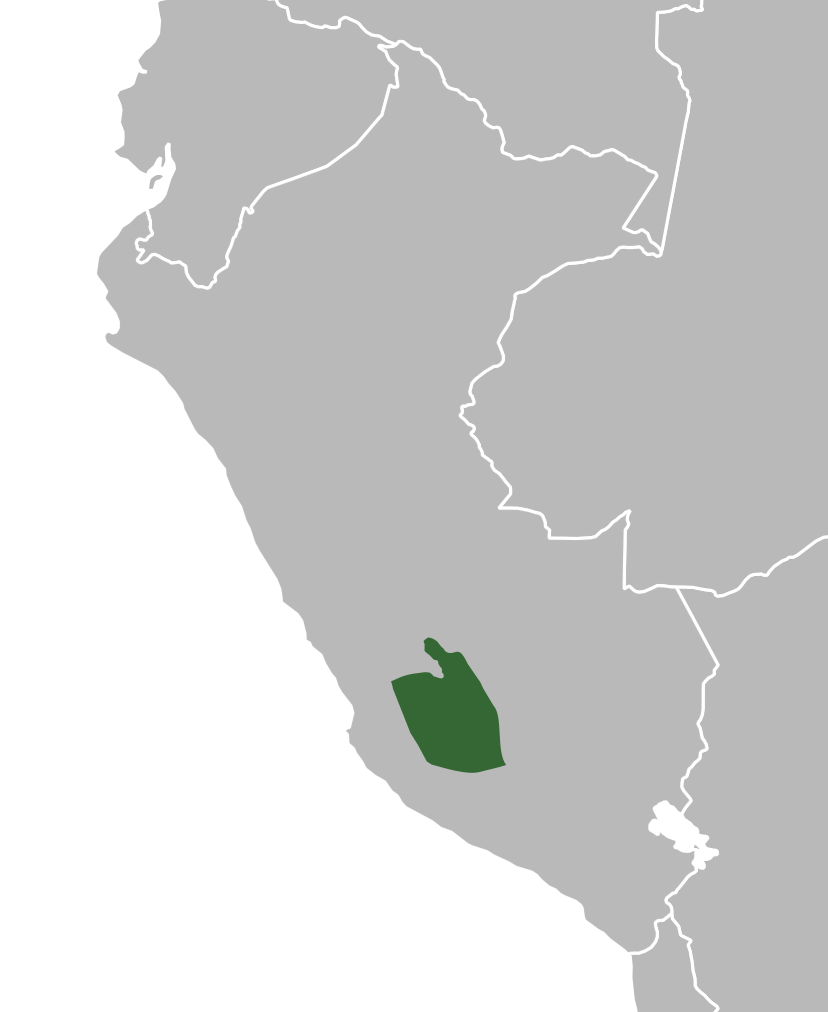
- Approximate territory of the Chanka confederation
- Capital: Auquimarca or Huaman Karpa
- Demonym: Chanka chiefdom
- Government: Chiefdom inside loose defensive confederation
Preceded by	Succeeded by
Wari Empire	Inca Empire
- Today part of: Peru

The Chanka (or Chanca) were an ethnic group living in Pre-Columbian South America, whose chiefdom was part of the Chanka "confederation": a loose defensive alliance of various chiefdoms, such as the Vilcas, the Huancas, the Chancas, and the Poqras.

From Catrovirreina, the Chanka migrated to the Andahuailas valley, defeated the local Quechua chiefdoms, and developed an important urban center and a chiefdom described in colonial writings as "rich and warmongering". According to María Rostworowski and Gonzalez Carré, attacks by Chanka groups led to the collapse of the Wari Empire. The Chanka chiefdom was ruled by two chiefs, the "Uscovilca" and the "Ancovilca", and waged war against the Soras and the Incas, and were defeated during the Inca-Chanka wars. Following the Incaic victory over the Chanka, the Soras were also subjected to Inca rule. However, the colonial-era ideas of a powerful Chanka entity are often called into question by various archaeologists, historians and anthropologists.

== Society ==
For some archaeologists, the Chanka society is a step backward from the point of view of urban progression, as compared with the Wari culture. Their settlement pattern was the most widespread of small villages (about 100 houses). Other scholars believe, however, that the Chankas had large populations. There are two types of burials: some in mausoleums, and others simply in the ground. There are also burials in caves or rock shelters.

They were not rivals of the Incas because they submitted peacefully to the Quechua of Cusco, losing their influence to their "older brothers," the Parkos or Hanan Chankas, because the Soras and Rucanas were valiant and warriors who fought the Incas many times.

They were characterized as farmers. Their god was a puma deity, they painted their faces and screamed when fighting, and they carried the mummies of their grandparents on their shoulders. The Chankas remained cohesive and managed to develop a major regional lordship, which reached its height in the 13th century.

=== Organization ===
Chanka Andahuaylas were close relatives of the other tribes that inhabited the province of Ayacucho, and as a nation were strengthened after the decline of the Wari expansion. According to Sarmiento de Gamboa, the Chanca territory was divided into three groups, known as Hanan Chanca (Parkos, Ayllus del Ancoyaco), Urin Chanka (Uranmarca, Andahuaylas) and villca or Rukanas (Vilcas). The Chanka nation was composed of the Ancoyaco, Andahuayla, Rucana and Sora tribes.

Regarding the geographic relationship of the native peoples, the Rucanas were divided into three groups: Hanan rucana, Hurin rucana and Andamarca rucana. According to anthropologist Víctor Navarro del Águila, rucana comes from rukak or lukak, which means shippers or mule drivers. The title was given to this province during the times of the Incan empire precisely because they were carriers for the royalty, wearing a distinctive white and red on their heads. The third important province of the Chankas was that of the Soras whose ancient language was Aymara. The Soras were divided into three groups: Hanan soras, Hurin soras and Chalco. They held a snowy mountain called Qarwarasu in great reverence, and were never defeated by the Chankas, but were at constant war with since they were allies with the Incas.

=== Warfare ===
According to Inca sources that told of the Chanka culture, the Hanan Chankas were bloody in battle. When they captured their enemies, they made them prisoners of war. They gave cruel punishments to show the enemy that they should not be messed with, such as scalping, or skinning prisoners alive. These prisoners were hung upside down so the blood concentrated in the upper body as they made small cuts on the front of the toes, and from there they began to tear the skin gradually, while the prisoner screamed and was terrified. Another common way for them to intimidate their enemies was to make cups from the skulls of prisoners, from which they drank the blood of the enemy gaining the contemporary nickname of "Vampires of the Andes".

=== Economy ===
The economy of the Uran Chancas was based primarily on agricultural crops and animals.

They grew various Andean cultivated plants, in different ecological zones, and raised and shepherded llamas, vicuna, alpacas and guanacos, in herds of appreciable size, which were managed from towns with special provisions to control them and feed them while they provided wool and meat.

=== Culture and ceramics ===
Generally the ceramics were flat with a rough surface, and sometimes with a red diluted slip. The decoration was a relief, with the application of buttons or clay figurines, supplemented with incisions or circular stamps. The shapes were open dishes and jugs with narrow necks, that sometimes had rustic faces.

The land where the Chanka culture was located was a strategic place because they dominated the territory and could easily develop defensive actions. The location was close to nearby water sources, and they could take advantage of the resources offered by the land and the presence of several ecological zones in which they were able to use to cultivate plants and rear animals.

Damián de la Bandera said about them:

They all live between the highest and the lowest points in ground cooler than hot, in high places and valleys caused by the rains, where they enjoy both extremes, of the colder land, to graze the domestic cattle, those that have them, and (those that don't) hunt the wild ones, and of the hotter land, to sow seeds, at their time. The villages are no bigger than the water and land will allow and in many of them no more than ten more indians could live for lack of water and ground.

The same Damián tells us that among these people there were three major trades: potters, silversmiths or metal workers, and carpenters. These trades endured until colonial times.

== History ==
=== Origin ===
According to various myths, its founders were Uscovilca (founder of Lurinchanca) and Ancovilca (founder of Hananmarca or Hanan Chanka). The error incurred until now was that the ethnic group of Hanan Chanka was confused with the Urin Chanka and that the latter joined the Pacor Pocoras in a non-existent entity called the "pocra-chancas confederation."

The Hanan Chankas were an ethnic group that inhabited the region of Ayacucho, Huancavelica, Junín, and part of Apurímac in Peru. They are said to have originated from the lake named Chuqlluqucha and united the colonial "Choclopus" (or "chocorvos") and Urququcha, both in the Huancavelica Department. Their initial territory was located between the Ancoyaco (current Mantaro), Pampas, and Pachachaca Rivers, tributaries of the Apurímac River. They expanded to the "Ancoyaco ayllukuna" area with its headquarters in Paucar and used the Urin Chankas of Andahuaylas as a secondary base. They developed an autonomous culture and spoke a language called puquina. Their capital was Waman Karpa ("falcon's tent"), on the shore of Lake Anori, 35 km from Andahuaylas, on the banks of the Pampas River.

The leader who began the expansion of the Chankas was called Uscovilca, and his mummy was preserved with veneration in Waman Karpa until the time of the Incas.

=== Apogee ===
The height of the Chanka's expansion occurred between the years 1200 and 1438. After 1430, the Chanka nation attacked the Inca Empire in Cusco. Prince Yupanqui, who had previously been sent to a llama ranch, defeated the Chanka. After the war, the Sapa Inca assumed the name Pachacuti after the tough battle, and the city of Cusco ran the risk of being captured by the Apurímac people. According to some Incan traditions, the Urin Chankas had been conquered much earlier, around the year 1230, when the Sapan Incan Mayta Cápac and his army crossed the Apurímac River, formerly called Qhapaq Mayu ("main river"), by means of a huge hanging bridge. The Incan Garcilaso de la Vega (1605) gives Cápac Yupanqui a similar feat one hundred years later. However, the most solidly researched version establishes their defeat and subsequent submission at the hands of the army commanded by the Incan Pachacuti.

=== Chanka-Inca war ===
It was in 1438 that the alleged leader Hanan Chanka "Anccu Hualloc" mythified himself so that the people or the "ayllus of Ancoyaco" (also called Anco Huayllu or Hancoallo) gathered 40,000 warriors and launched the conquest of Cusco. They advanced victoriously to encircle the city. The Incan Viracocha and many of the nobility fled in the direction of Qullasuyu, and were in despair until a prince, Cusi Yupanqui (who later proclaimed himself Pachacutec), bravely led the resistance. While able to gather allies, he offered peace to the besieged, but they rejected the offer. A bloody battle was fought in Yawarpampa ("field of blood"), won by Cusco with the timely arrival of friendly forces. The Indian chronicler, Joan de Santa Cruz Pachacuti Yampa Salcamaygua (1613). He states that the battle would have been lost if the stone soldiers ("pururaucas") had not been brought miraculously to life—stones that were dressed as soldiers to fool the Chankas.

According to the victors, 22,000 Chancas and 8,000 Cusqueños (natives of Cusco) died at Yawarpampa. Anccu Hualloc was injured and captured. The Hanan Chankas were chased as far as Antahualla (Apurímac).

The leader who defended Cusco took up sovereign power and founded a new dynasty. According to the Commentarios Reales de los Incas by Garcilaso de la Vega, the Incan fugitive was the old Yawar Waqaq, and the prince that took up the defence of Cusco was his son, Hatun Topa, afterwards called Viracocha Inca. According to Juan de Betanzos (1551), the fugitive was the old Viracocha and not only him but his successor (and the brother of Cusi Yupanqui), Inca Urco, escaped responsibility, the prince Cusi Yapanqui being their saviour.

According to the victors, the Incan was the fugitive elder Yawar Waqaq and the prince who assumed the defense of Cuzco was his son Topa Hatun, named after Viracocha Inca. This is the most accepted version, which coincides with the chronicle of Miguel Cabello de Balboa (1583) and the most refined chronologies.

Other chroniclers, among them Bernabé Cobo (1653), mention a second attack by the Chankas shortly after, also headed by Anccu Huayco against Pachacútec. The imprisoned leader not only managed to escape, but gathered 8,000 Chanka fighters in Challcumarca and in Suramarca and resumed the war, this time to regain the lost territories. Being inferior in force, he chose to escape to the jungle "to a region of large ponds or lakes," following the course of the Urubamba river.

=== Spanish Conquest of the Inca Empire ===
As the Inca Civil War between Huáscar and Atahuallpa, the sons of Huayna Cápac were tearing down the Inca Empire, the Chankas, who had been enslaved under the mitma for over a hundred years and were already in the verge of extinction, heard stories coming from the north about “mysterious men with pale faces wearing armors and riding beasts (horses)”. Taking advantage of the Civil War, a bunch of Chankas managed to escape to meet these mysterious men who ended up being Spanish Conquistadores. During the meeting, the Spanish were already joined by many Indian auxiliaries: the Cañaris (who have fought on Huáscar's side against Atahualpa), Huancas and Chachapoyas. Chankas using Felipillo as interpreter, proposed them a deal to fight together against the Incas who had stolen their lands, killed their people and enslaving the remaining survivors. The Spaniards seemed interested at first, but after hearing from their Native allies about the savage nature of the Chankas in battle, they immediately refused, since those actions (like drinking the blood of their enemies and keeping their heads as trophies) were "against their Christian values". The Indian auxiliaries refused to cooperate with the Spaniards if they made a deal with the Chankas. But Francisco Pizarro, the leader of the Spanish expedition, seeing potential in them, was the only one who trusted the Chankas and convinced his men and the Indian auxiliaries that they only needed “proper leadership” since their fighting skills were superior to the Huancas, Cañaris and Chachapoyas and their cooperation would guarantee their victory.

=== Viceroyalty of Peru ===
With the Spanish victory, as part of the deal, Chankas recovered their freedom and their lands. Most of them were baptized and started learning Spanish. As part of the bond between both cultures, they mixed with Spanish men and women having mestizo children. However, despite playing a crucial part in the fight against the Incas, only the Huancas were recognized by the King Philip II for their help in the Conquest of Peru. Furthermore, while the Chankas were nominally protected by Native Peruvians by the Leyes de las Indias, numerous abuses from Spanish priests went unpunished. These include the crimes of Father Juan Bautista de Albadán, who during a period of ten years (1601–11), sadistically tortured the people of Pampachiri while amassing a personal fortune. Albadán manipulated the juridical and political systems in his favour so that he could avoid any prosecution for his crimes, which included murder, torture and rape. In one incident, it was reported that an artist, Don Juan Uacrau, was stripped naked and tied with leather thongs upside down on the cross. Albadán beat him for hours and burnt his whole body with tallow candles. Uacrau was tortured because he either protested the sexual assault of his daughters, or the wider behaviour of Albadán. The effects of Albadán's reign – a “decade of madness” - would last well into the 18th Century.

=== Remains ===
Their most impressive remains are "Inca Raqay," which have been studied by Martha Anders. The ruins are on the banks of the Mantaro River, north of Huanta where the Urin Chankas built the outstanding Suntur fort, the metalworking centre of Curamba and the Inti Watana in Uranmarca, strategically located in the most beautiful parts of the Andahuaylas Province. In every district there is also a large variety of remains which demonstrate the legacy of the Wari Pacor, Chanka and Inka cultures.

Although there is information about their military history and warlords, the archaeological remains identified as Chankas do not allow for an exact profile of the life and customs of these people.

Waman Karpa (near Andahuaylas), as well as Carahuasi and Rumihuasi (near Abancay), still require further investigation.

Many Chanka ceramics and instruments are part of expositions in museums located in Apurímac, Ayacucho and Lamas, where the Chanka descendants also live.
