= Kishuara District =

Coordinates: 13°42′S 73°06′W

Kishuara Kiswara
- District
- Interactive map of Kishuara
- Country: Peru
- Region: Apurímac
- Province: Andahuaylas
- Founded: January 20, 1944
- Capital: Kishuara

Government
  - Mayor: Ruben Moises Hurtado Vera

Area
  - Total: 309.91 km^{2} (119.66 sq mi)
- Elevation: 3,665 m (12,024 ft)

Population (2005 census)
  - Total: 7,884
  - Density: 25.44/km^{2} (65.89/sq mi)
- Time zone: UTC-5 (PET)
- UBIGEO: 030207

Kishuara (from Kiswara, the Aymara name for Buddleja incana) is one of the nineteen districts of the Andahuaylas Province in Peru.

== Geography ==
One of the highest peaks of the district is Sallapi at approximately 4,800 m (15,700 ft). Other mountains are listed below:

- Anka Pata
- Aqchi Wachana
- Atuq Wachana
- Chuntani
- Hatun P'ukru
- Kuntur Tiyana
- Minasniyuq
- Puka Wanaku
- Qantu Pata
- Ramarayuq
- Rayusqayuq
- Sami Punta
- Saqsa Marka
- Sayaq Rumi
- Suntur
- Suyt'u Urqu
- Tumiri
- Uqa Pata
- Wachu Quri
- Wachwalla
- Walla P'ukru
- Wanqan
- Waywakani
- Wirunay

== Ethnic groups ==
The people in the district are mainly indigenous citizens of Quechua descent. Quechua is the language which the majority of the population (94.77%) learn to speak in childhood, while 4.83% of the residents speak Spanish as a first language (2007 Peru Census).

== See also ==
- Suqtaqucha
