= Talavera (surname) =

Talavera is a Spanish toponymic surname which comes from Talavera de la Reina in the Toledo province of Spain. This surname is occasionally borne as a Sephardic Jewish surname.

== Notable people with this surname ==
- Alfredo Talavera (born 1982), Mexican footballer
- Francisco Ibáñez Talavera (1936–2023), Spanish comic book artist and writer
- Francisco Javier Errázuriz Talavera (born 1942), Chilean businessman and politician
- Hernando de Talavera (1428-1507), confessor of Queen Isabella, and the Catholic Archbishop of Granada
- Hugo Ricardo Talavera (born 1949), Paraguayan footballer
- Juan Andrés Fontaine Talavera, Chilean cabinet minister
- Tracee Talavera (born 1966), Mexican-American gymnast

== See also ==
- Talavera (disambiguation)
