= Vilcas Huamán District =

Coordinates: 13.6541°S 73.9576°W

Vilcas Huamán Willka Waman
- District
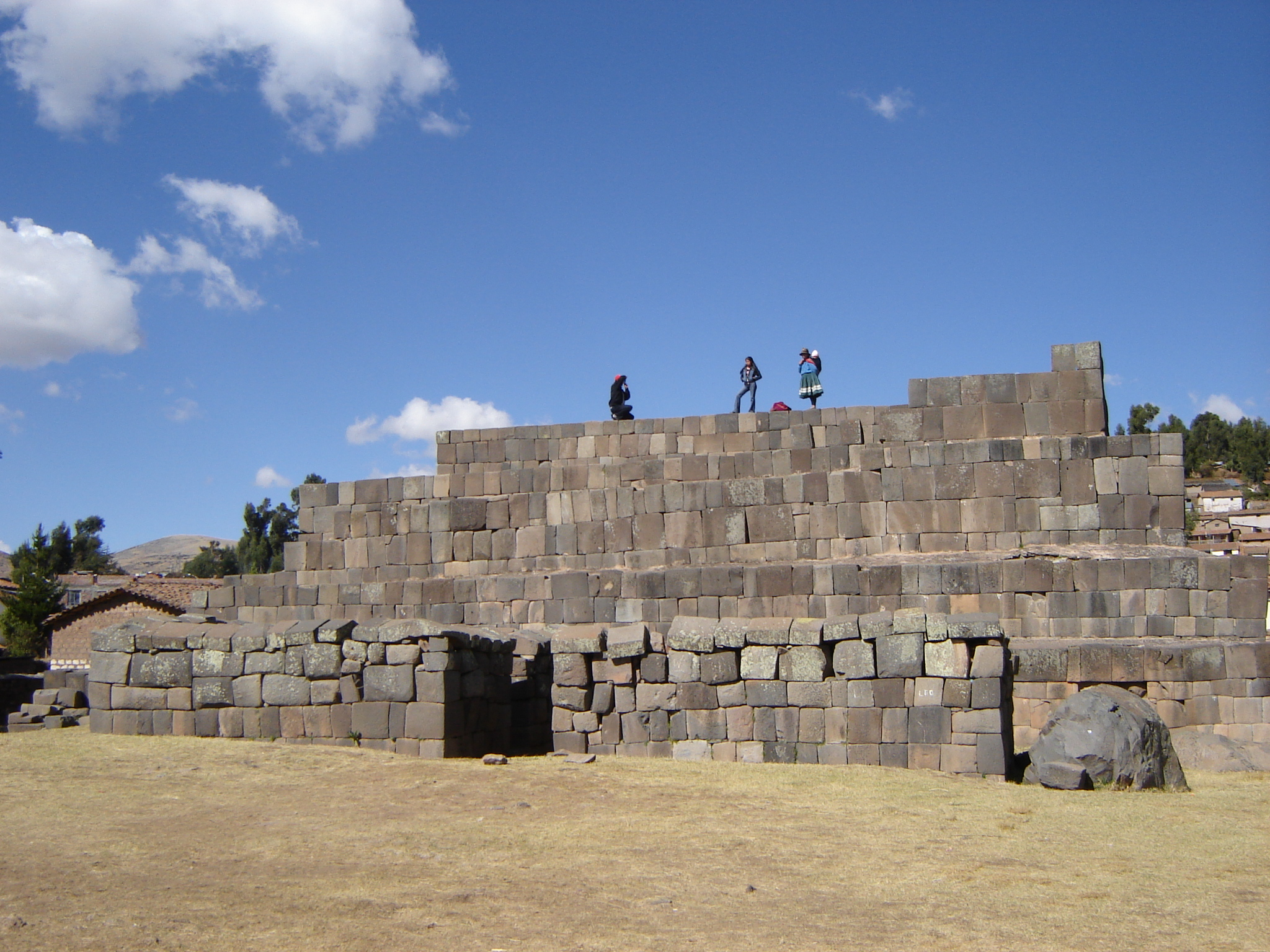
- Usnu in Vilcas Huamán
- Interactive map of Vilcas Huamán
- Country: Peru
- Region: Ayacucho
- Province: Vilcas Huamán
- Founded: February 1, 1944
- Capital: Vilcas Huamán

Area
  - Total: 216.89 km^{2} (83.74 sq mi)
- Elevation: 3,470 m (11,380 ft)

Population (2005 census)
  - Total: 8,406
  - Density: 38.76/km^{2} (100.4/sq mi)
- Time zone: UTC-5 (PET)
- UBIGEO: 051101

Vilcas Huamán or Vilcas Guamán (from Quechua Willka Waman) is one of eight districts of the Vilcas Huamán Province in Peru.

== Geography ==
One of the highest mountains of the district is Qutu Pukyu at approximately 4,000 m (13,000 ft). Other mountains are listed below:

- Anta Qaqa
- Awkillana
- Chumpiq
- Hatun
- Maknu Q'asa
- Pilluchu
- Puka Q'asa
- Qullpa Muqu
- Ranra
- Tiklla Rasu
- Urqu Pata
- Urqun Wasi
- Wayra Q'asa

== Ethnic groups ==
The people in the district are mainly indigenous citizens of Quechua descent. Quechua is the language which the majority of the population (87.91%) learnt to speak in childhood, 11.78% of the residents started speaking using the Spanish language (2007 Peru Census).

== See also ==
- Pilluchu
- Usnu
