= San Miguel de Chaccrapampa District =

Coordinates: 13.951°S 73.6546°W

San Miguel de Chaccrapampa Chakrapampa
- District
- Interactive map of San Miguel de Chaccrapampa
- Country: Peru
- Region: Apurímac
- Province: Andahuaylas
- Founded: June 8, 1990
- Capital: Chaccrapampa

Government
  - Mayor: Felix Vargas Loa

Area
  - Total: 83.37 km^{2} (32.19 sq mi)
- Elevation: 3,650 m (11,980 ft)

Population (2005 census)
  - Total: 2,312
  - Density: 27.73/km^{2} (71.83/sq mi)
- Time zone: UTC-5 (PET)
- UBIGEO: 030214

San Miguel de Chaccrapampa or Chakrapampa (Quechua chakra field, pampa large plain, "field plain") is one of the nineteen districts of the Andahuaylas Province in Peru.

== Ethnic groups ==
The people in the district are mainly indigenous citizens of Quechua descent. Quechua is the language which the majority of the population (98.07%) learnt to speak in childhood, 1.81% of the residents started speaking using the Spanish language (2007 Peru Census).
