= Andahuaylas District =

Coordinates: 13°39′27″S 73°23′00″W

Andahuaylas Anta Waylla
- District
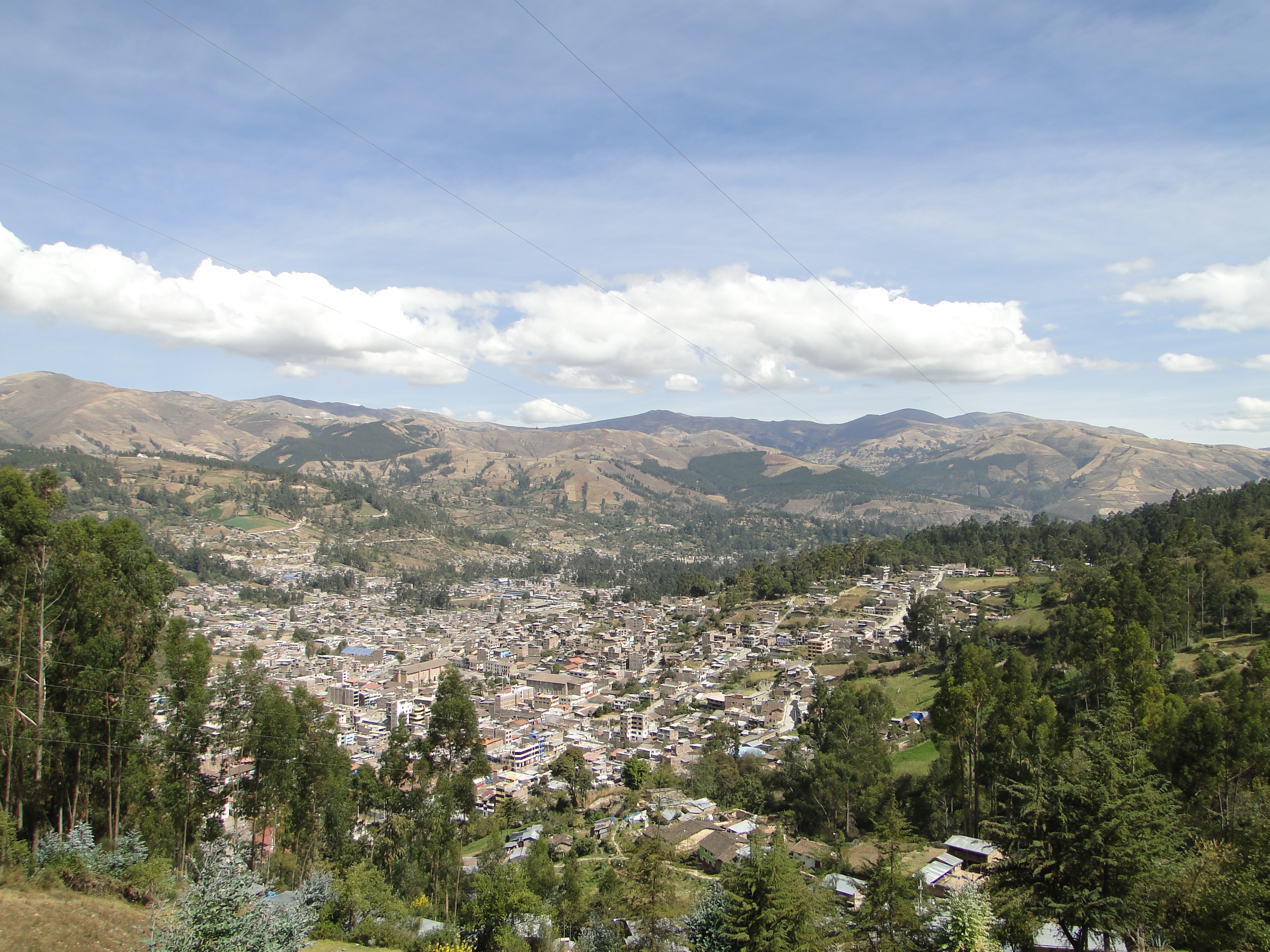
- Panoramic view of the Andahuaylas district
- Interactive map of Andahuaylas
- Country: Peru
- Region: Apurímac
- Province: Andahuaylas
- Capital: Andahuaylas

Government
  - Mayor: Victor Manuel Molina Quintana

Area
  - Total: 370.03 km^{2} (142.87 sq mi)
- Elevation: 2,926 m (9,600 ft)

Population (2005 census)
  - Total: 34,087
  - Density: 92.120/km^{2} (238.59/sq mi)
- Time zone: UTC-5 (PET)
- UBIGEO: 030201
- Website: muniandahuaylas.gob.pe

Andahuaylas District is one of the nineteen districts of the Andahuaylas Province in Peru.

== Geography ==
One of the highest peaks of the district is Saqra Urqu at approximately 4,400 m (14,400 ft). Other mountains are listed below:

- Anta Qaqa
- Atuq Wachanan
- Chaku Urqu
- Ch'iqu Rumi
- Kampanayuq
- Kunturillu
- Liq'i Yakana Pampa
- Parya Qaqa
- Pukar
- Puywan
- Saqsa Waman
- Supay P'ukru
- Wanqani
- Yana Urqu
- Yura Qaqa

== Ethnic groups ==
The people in the district are mainly indigenous citizens of Quechua descent. Quechua is the language which the majority of the population (52.01%) learnt to speak in childhood, 47.49% of the residents started speaking using the Spanish language (2007 Peru Census).

== See also ==
- Suyt'uqucha
