= Titankayuq =

Protected natural area in Peru

- Interactive map of Titankayuq
- Location: Peru, Ayacucho Region
- Coordinates: 13°33′23″S 73°58′56″W
- Established: December 23, 2010

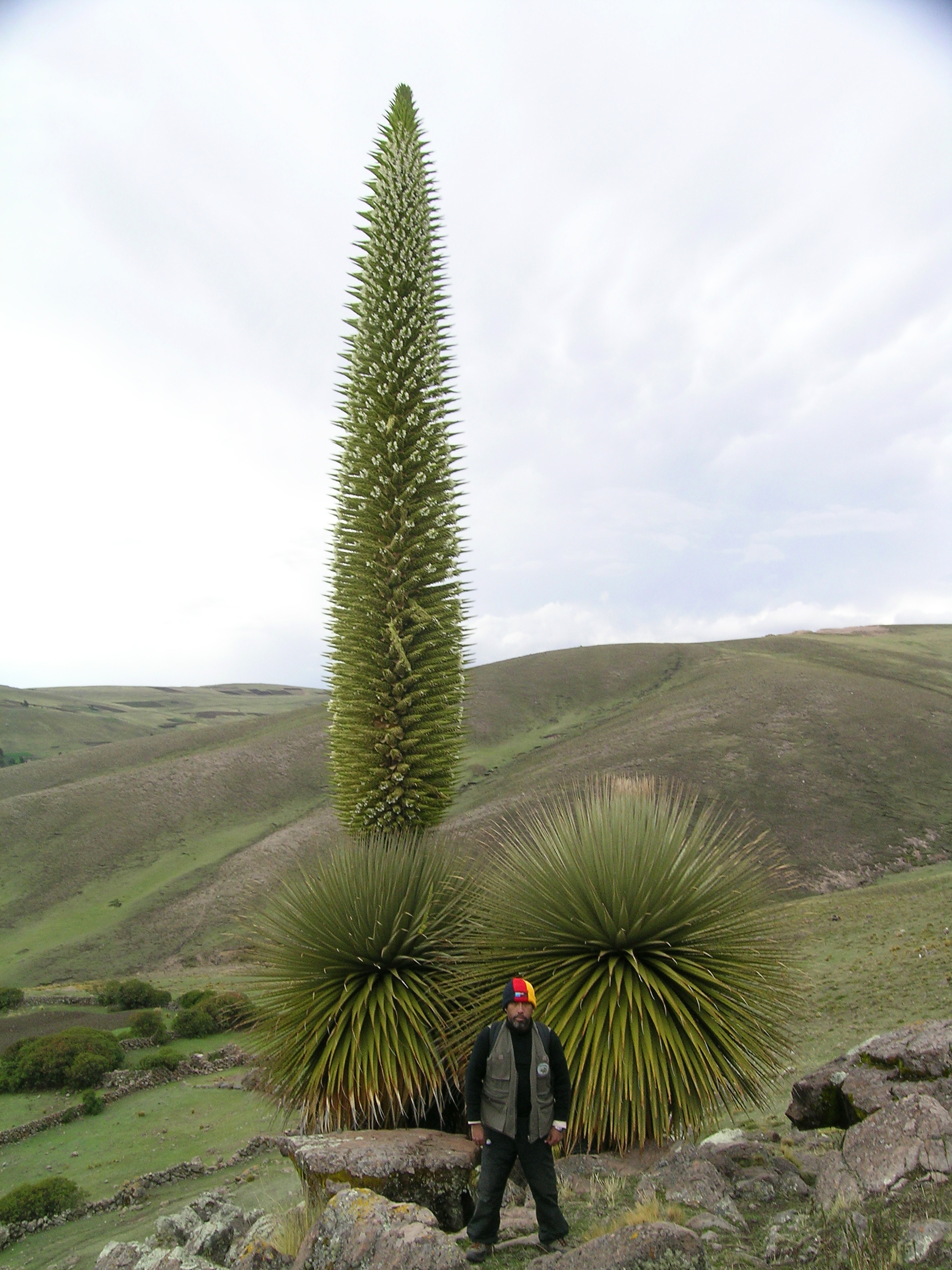
Titanka (Puya raimondii) flowering in Ayacucho, Peru

Titankayuq (Quechua titanka Puya raimondii, -yuq a suffix to indicate ownership, "the one with titanka", other spellings Titancayoc, Titancayocc, Titankayoc, Titankayocc, Tutanccayoc) is one of the most important habitats in Peru for the Puya raimondii. The woods of Puya raimondii are located in the Ayacucho Region, Vilcas Huamán Province, Vischongo District, at elevations between 3,250 metres (10,663 ft) and 4,250 metres (13,944 ft).

Titankayuq was declared an Area of Regional Conservation by Supreme Decrete of December 23, 2010.

== See also ==
- Inti Watana
- Pumaqucha
