= Huambalpa District =

Coordinates: 13.6185°S 74.0035°W

Huambalpa
- District
- Interactive map of Huambalpa
- Country: Peru
- Region: Ayacucho
- Province: Vilcas Huamán
- Capital: Huambalpa

Area
  - Total: 150.76 km^{2} (58.21 sq mi)
- Elevation: 3,262 m (10,702 ft)

Population (2005 census)
  - Total: 2,764
  - Density: 18.33/km^{2} (47.48/sq mi)
- Time zone: UTC-5 (PET)
- UBIGEO: 051105

Huambalpa District is one of eight districts of the province Vilcas Huamán in Peru.

== Ethnic groups ==
The people in the district are mainly indigenous citizens of Quechua descent. Quechua is the language which the majority of the population (95.35%) learnt to speak in childhood, 4.26% of the residents started speaking using the Spanish language (2007 Peru Census).
