= Llamachayuq =

Archaeological site in Peru

Coordinates: 13°38′58″S 73°22′26″W

- Interactive map of Llamachayuq
- Location: Peru, Apurímac Region, Andahuaylas Province

Site notes
- Height: 3,449 metres (11,316 ft)

Llamachayuq (Quechua llama llama, -cha, -yuq suffixes, "with a little llama (or llamas)", also spelled Llamachayoq) is an archaeological complex with petroglyphs in Peru. It is located in the Apurímac Region, Andahuaylas Province, San Jerónimo District. The site with images of llamas, vicuñas, felines, people and the sun lies near Lliwpa Pukyu (Lliupapuquio) at a height of 3,449 metres (11,316 ft).
