= Huancarama District =

Coordinates: 13°39′16″S 73°05′08″W

Huancarama
- District
- Interactive map of Huancarama
- Country: Peru
- Region: Apurímac
- Province: Andahuaylas
- Capital: Huancarama

Government
  - Mayor: Carlos Cavero Contreras

Area
  - Total: 153.04 km^{2} (59.09 sq mi)
- Elevation: 2,965 m (9,728 ft)

Population (2005 census)
  - Total: 7,792
  - Density: 50.91/km^{2} (131.9/sq mi)
- Time zone: UTC-5 (PET)
- UBIGEO: 030204

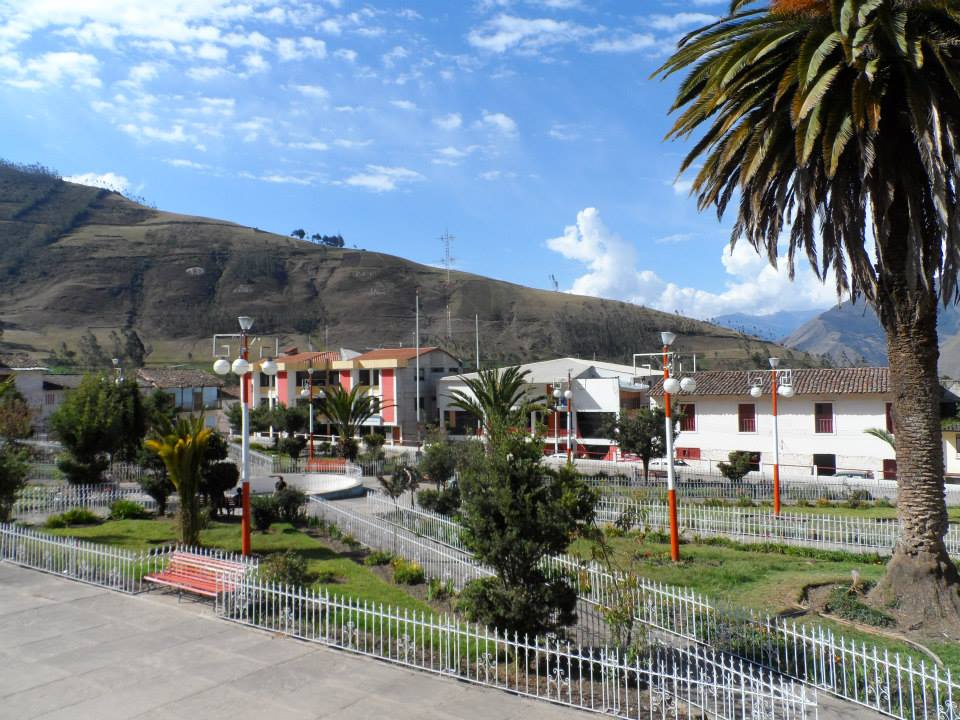
The Plaza de armas of Huancarama

Huancarama District is one of the nineteen districts of the province Andahuaylas in Peru.

== Ethnic groups ==
The people in the district are mainly indigenous citizens of Quechua descent. Quechua is the language which the majority of the population (80.11%) learnt to speak in childhood, 19.47% of the residents started speaking using the Spanish language (2007 Peru Census).
