= Andarapa District =

Coordinates: 13°42′S 73°24′W

Andarapa
- District
- Interactive map of Andarapa
- Country: Peru
- Region: Apurímac
- Province: Andahuaylas
- Founded: March 14, 1941
- Capital: Andarapa

Government
  - Mayor: Agapito Leguia Guzman

Area
  - Total: 172.05 km^{2} (66.43 sq mi)
- Elevation: 2,935 m (9,629 ft)

Population (2005 census)
  - Total: 7,775
  - Density: 45.19/km^{2} (117.0/sq mi)
- Time zone: UTC-5 (PET)
- UBIGEO: 030202

Andarapa District is one of the nineteen districts of the province Andahuaylas in Peru.

== Ethnic groups ==
The people in the district are mainly indigenous citizens of Quechua descent. Quechua is the language which the majority of the population (96.35%) learnt to speak in childhood, 3.44% of the residents started speaking using the Spanish language (2007 Peru Census).
