= Wamp'u =

Wamp'u (Quechua for boat, also spelled Huampo, Huampu, Huanpu) may refer to:

- Wamp'u (Apurímac), a mountain in the Apurímac Region, Peru
- Wamp'u (Huaylas), a mountain in the Huaylas Province, Ancash Region, Peru
- Wamp'u (Huaylas-Yungay), a mountain on the border of the provinces of Huaylas and Yungay, Ancash Region, Peru
