= Awkimarka (Apurímac) =

Archaeological site in Peru

- Location within Peru
- 14°04′56″S 73°33′06″W
- Location: Peru
- Region: Apurímac Region, Andahuaylas Province

Awkimarka (Quechua awki prince / a mythical figure of the Andean culture / grandfather, marka village, Hispanicized spelling Auquimarca) is an archaeological site in the Apurímac Region in Peru. It lies on a mountain of the same name which reaches a height of about 4,000 metres (13,123 ft). It is situated in the Apurímac Region, Andahuaylas Province, on the border of the districts of Pomacocha and Tumay Huaraca.
