= Sóndor =

Archaeological site in Peru

Coordinates: 13.6063°S 73.2689°W

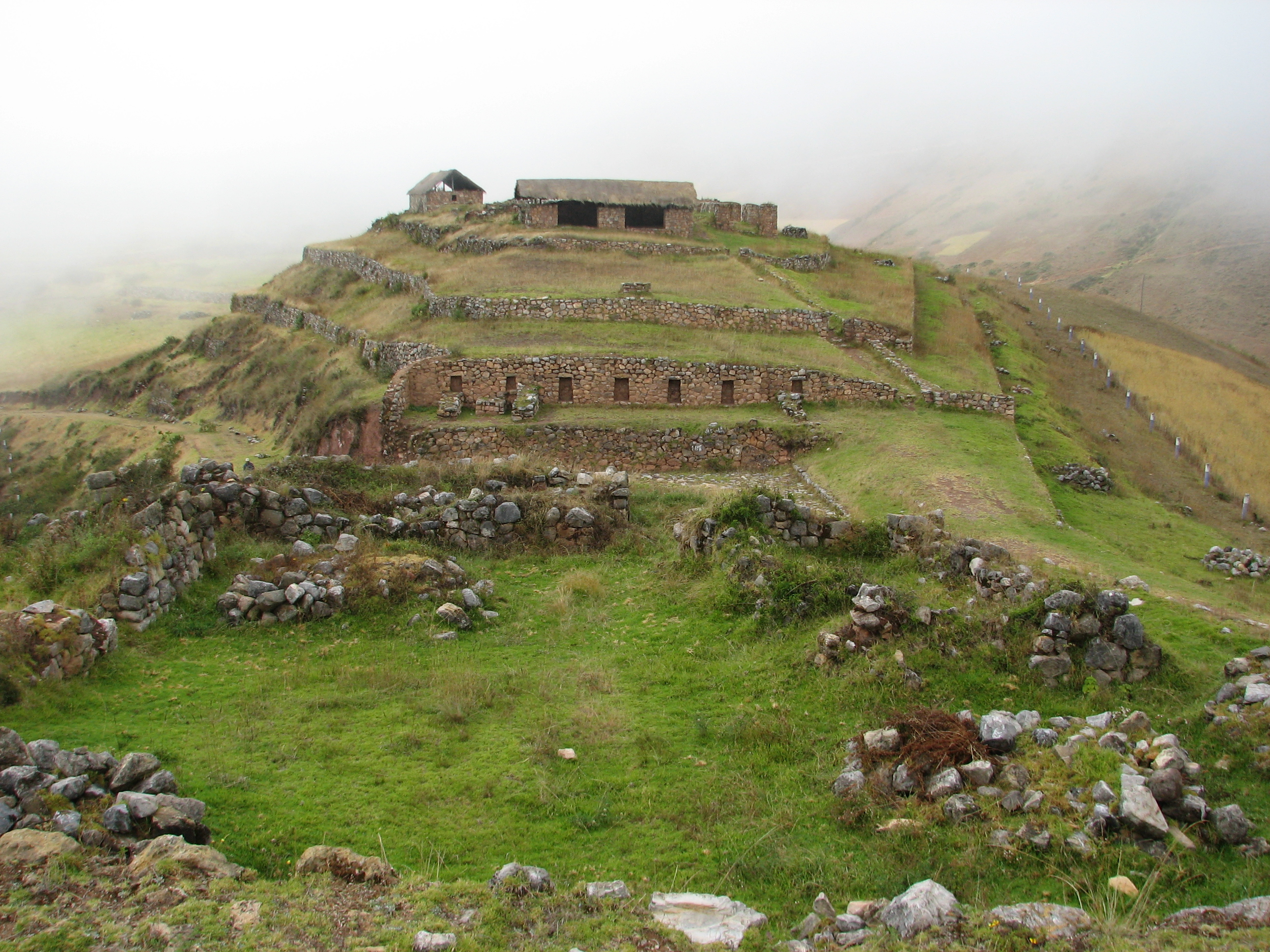
- View of Sóndor
- Interactive map of Sóndor
- Type: Temple
- Cultures: Chanka
- Location: Pacucha District, Andahuaylas Province, Apurímac

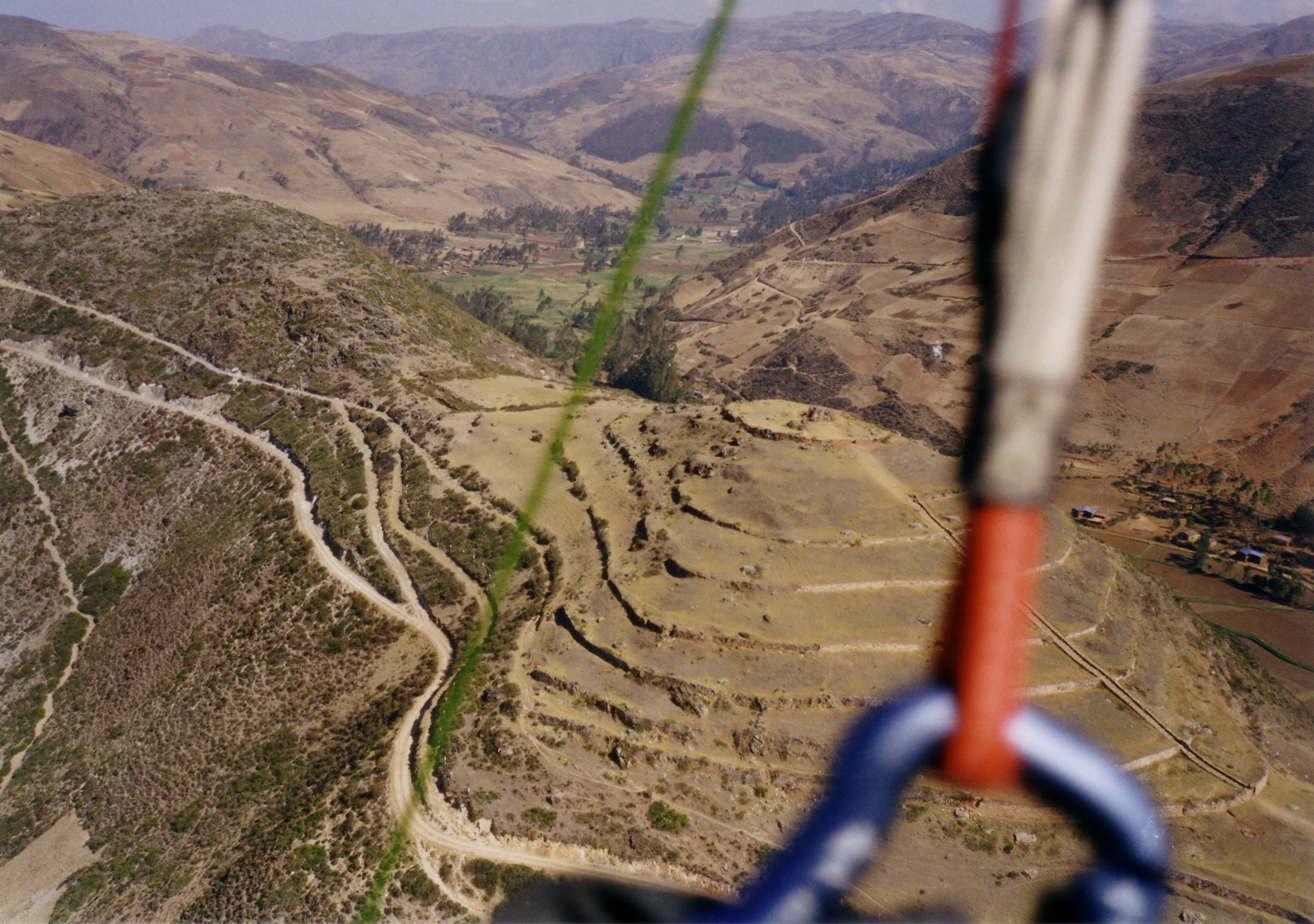
Sondor, view from above

Sóndor (possibly from Quechua suntur: congress, meeting) is an archaeological site in Peru built by the Chanka people. The main part consists of a temple like structure used for religious and astronomical purposes. It is located in the Apurímac Region, Andahuaylas Province, Pacucha District.
