= Pampachiri =

- District
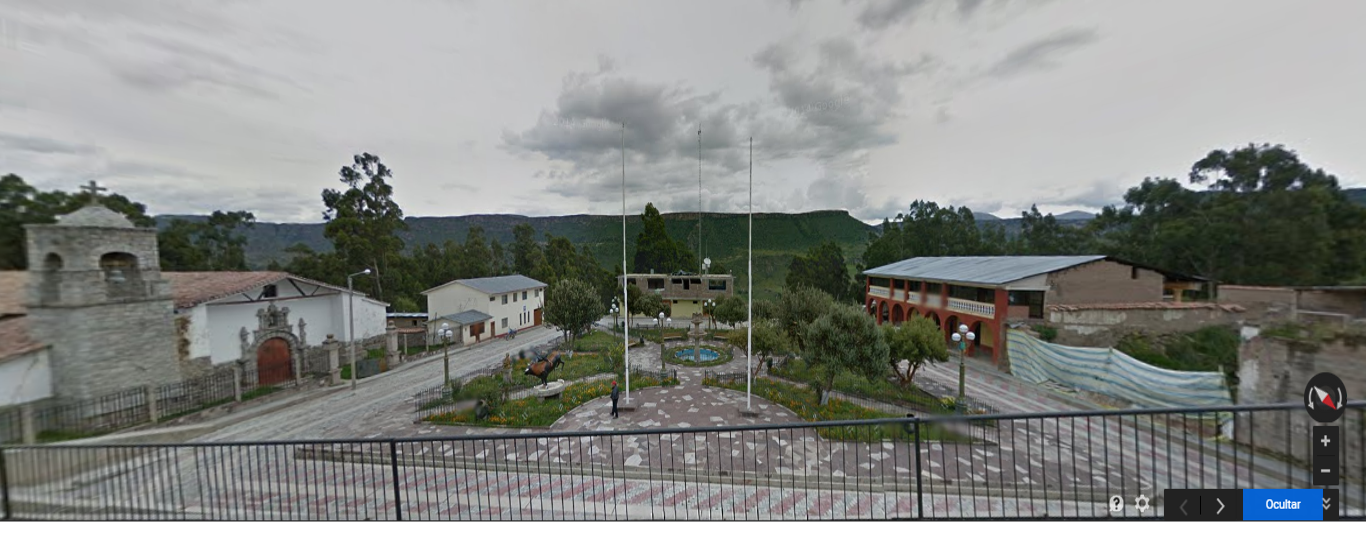
- Pampachiri
- Interactive map of Pampachiri
- Coordinates: 14°11′S 73°33′W
- Country: Peru
- Region: Apurímac
- Province: Andahuaylas
- Capital: Pampachiri

Government
  - Mayor: Wilfredo Cirilo Chipana Fernandez

Area
  - Total: 602.5 km^{2} (232.6 sq mi)
- Elevation: 3,362 m (11,030 ft)

Population (2005 census)
  - Total: 2,948
  - Density: 4.893/km^{2} (12.67/sq mi)
- Time zone: UTC-5 (PET)
- UBIGEO: 030210

Pampachiri is a rural district in Andahuaylas Province in the Apurímac Region of southern Peru. It is also the name of a village in the district. The population of the district is about 2,400 with about 1,000 of those residents living in the village of the same name.

Before the Spanish conquest, it was populated by the Inca, Chanka and Wari peoples who have left numerous archeological sites in the area. There exist populations of pumas, condors and many other rare animals and plants.

It is an area of natural beauty. High in the puna area is Panqulla, a stone forest which is an unusual geological phenomenon of volcanic rocks in the shape of large smooth cones.

It is situated on the Puquio to Andahuaylas Highway which as of 2010 is still unpaved. The main economic activities of the population are subsistence agriculture and cattle raising (lowlands) and alpaca and vicuña husbandry (highlands). Typical crops grown in Pampachiri include potatoes, corn, alfalfa, and tuna, the fruit of the cactus indigenous to the region. It is one of the poorest districts of Peru, with a typical family income of under US$1000 a year.

== Geography ==
One of the highest peaks of the district is Sutaya at approximately 4,900 m (16,100 ft). Other mountains are listed below:

- Aka P'ukru
- Anta Q'asa
- Chakra Pata
- Chawpi Urqu
- Chunta
- Chuntani
- Chupa
- Ch'uch'u Wanqa
- Ichhu Urqu
- Kachin Chilla
- Karka Suntu
- Kuntur Phaqcha
- Kunturillu
- Liwa Q'asa
- Ñawpa Llaqta
- Panqulla
- Paryasqa
- Pirwachayuq Pata
- Puka Qaqa
- P'unqu Q'asa
- Qala Pata
- Qucha Qucha
- Quri Mina
- Q'illu Q'illu
- Ruphasqa
- Sara Sara
- Saywa Pata
- Sirka Muqu
- Sirkata
- Sura Pata
- Urmay
- Wachwalla
- Wansu
- Waraqu Pata
- Waych'ayuq
- Yuraq Qaqa

== Ethnic groups ==
The people in the district are mainly indigenous citizens of Quechua descent. Quechua is the language which the majority of the population (69.69%) learnt to speak in childhood, 29.91% of the residents started speaking using the Spanish language (2007 Peru Census).
