= Carhuanca District =

Coordinates: 13.7422°S 73.7866°W

Carhuanca
- District
- Interactive map of Carhuanca
- Country: Peru
- Region: Ayacucho
- Province: Vilcas Huamán
- Capital: Carhuanca

Area
  - Total: 56.91 km^{2} (21.97 sq mi)
- Elevation: 2,960 m (9,710 ft)

Population (2005 census)
  - Total: 1,201
  - Density: 21.10/km^{2} (54.66/sq mi)
- Time zone: UTC-5 (PET)
- UBIGEO: 051103

Carhuanca District is one of eight districts of the province Vilcas Huamán in Peru.

== Ethnic groups ==
The people in the district are mainly indigenous citizens of Quechua descent. Quechua is the language which the majority of the population (83.83%) learnt to speak in childhood, 15.90% of the residents started speaking using the Spanish language (2007 Peru Census).

== See also ==
- Puntay Urqu
