= Kaquiabamba District =

Coordinates: 13°48′S 73°30′W

Kaquiabamba
- District
- Interactive map of Kaquiabamba
- Country: Peru
- Region: Apurímac
- Province: Andahuaylas
- Founded: June 9, 1995
- Capital: Kaquiabamba

Government
  - Mayor: Ruben Vivanco Ccoicca

Area
  - Total: 97.79 km^{2} (37.76 sq mi)
- Elevation: 3,150 m (10,330 ft)

Population (2005 census)
  - Total: 2,971
  - Density: 30.38/km^{2} (78.69/sq mi)
- Time zone: UTC-5 (PET)
- UBIGEO: 030219

Kaquiabamba District is one of the nineteen districts of the province Andahuaylas in Peru.

== Ethnic groups ==
The people in the district are mainly indigenous citizens of Quechua descent. Quechua is the language which the majority of the population (93.23 %) learnt to speak in childhood, 6.55% of the residents started speaking using the Spanish language (2007 Peru Census).
