= Suyt'uqucha (Apurímac) =

Lake in Peru

- Location within Peru
- Location: Apurímac Region
- Coordinates: 13°49′33″S 73°16′26″W
- Basin countries: Peru
- Max. length: 2.49 km (1.55 mi)
- Max. width: 0.8 km (0.50 mi)
- Surface elevation: 4,272 m (14,016 ft)

Suyt'uqucha (Quechua suyt'u, sayt'u rectangular, qucha lake, lagoon, "rectangular lake", Hispanicized spelling Suytuccocha) is a lake in Peru located in the Apurímac Region, Andahuaylas Province, Andahuaylas District. It is situated at a height of about 4,272 metres (14,016 ft), about 2.49 km long and 0.8 km at its widest point. Suyt'uqucha lies southwest of Antaqucha ("copper lake") of the San Jerónimo District.

== See also ==
- List of lakes in Peru
