= Gastón Mansilla Yupanqui =

Gastón Gabriel Mansilla Yupanqui
- Born: 1991

Gastón Gabriel Mansilla Yupanqui (born 1991), is a Peruvian university student. He studied at Universidad Nacional Federico Villarreal. He killed Víctor Ríos Acevedo (a.k.a. Niño Viejo/Old Boy) on Saturday January 7, 2012 in an apparent act of self-defense near the intersection of Tacna Avenue and Colmena Avenue, in Lima, Peru.

According to Mansilla, two muggers approached him armed with switchblades and demanded his phone and backpack. Mansilla, who had a valid concealed weapons permit at the time of the attack, drew his .38 caliber pistol and during a scuffle fired at point blank range, killing Acevedo. Acevedo's accomplice, Christian Arenas Perona, attempted to flee, but was immediately detained by police. According to Mansilla's attorney, an eyewitness corroborates Mr. Mansilla's story.

Mansilla was arrested and charged with second degree murder and/or violation of the Peruvian Law of Proportionality, a law that had been repealed in 2003. Under the terms of this law, self-defense must be conducted only with a weapon similar to that employed by an attacker. In this case the assailants were armed with knives.

The Third Penal Court's decision to keep Mansilla in jail during the investigation was immediately objected to by his family and friends who staged a demonstration calling for his immediate release. Education Faculty dean Manuel Asmat and Congressman Juan Díaz Dios presented a writ of habeas corpus on Mansilla's behalf. Classmate Marco Vargas Romero labeled the judge's decision, "unbelievable" "surprising" and "arbitrary". Several other Congressmen also spoke in Mansilla's defense, including Renzo Reggiardo, who criticized Judge Asunción Puma León's decision to order Mansilla's arrest, and Víctor Andrés García Belaúnde, who said the court's decision to imprison Mansilla is an "abuse" that must be sanctioned by the Office of the Control of the Magistrate (OCMA).

Congressman Díaz indicated that he would send a report to OCMA and to the president of the Justice System.

On 12 January 2012, José Luis Pérez, head of the Instituto Nacional Penitenciario (INPE), received a judicial order for Mansilla's release issued by Juan Carlos Aranda Giraldo, who presides over the second penal court, revoking the detention order. Mansilla was liberated on 13 January 2012.

On 13 January 2012 OCMA suspended Puma while the disciplinary process against her is resolved. On 13 January the judge appeared on the TV Program 90 seconds to defend her actions. "I am not inept," she declared. "I have no reason to regret making an appealable jurisdictional decision." She denied that the decision to jail Mansilla pending the investigation was prompted by the Law of Proportionality. The judge turned in her letter of resignation at that time, but this did not end the disciplinary investigation against her.
