= Talavera District =

Coordinates: 14°05′S 73°43′W

Talavera
- District
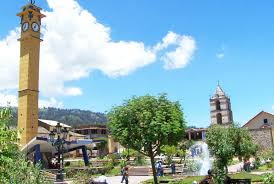
- Interactive map of Talavera
- Country: Peru
- Region: Apurímac
- Province: Andahuaylas
- Capital: Talavera

Government
  - Mayor: Juan Ricardo Reynoso Gutierrez

Area
  - Total: 148.12 km^{2} (57.19 sq mi)
- Elevation: 2,820 m (9,250 ft)

Population (2005 census)
  - Total: 17,707
  - Density: 119.54/km^{2} (309.62/sq mi)
- Time zone: UTC-5 (PET)
- UBIGEO: 030216

Talavera District is one of the nineteen districts of the province Andahuaylas in Peru.

== Ethnic groups ==
The people in the district are mainly indigenous citizens of Quechua descent. Quechua is the language which the majority of the population (58.77%) learnt to speak in childhood, 40.92% of the residents started speaking using the Spanish language (2007 Peru Census).

== See also ==
- Chiri Yaku
