= San Jerónimo District, Andahuaylas =

Coordinates: 13°39′04″S 73°21′54″W

San Jerónimo District Distrito de San Jerónimo
- District
- Interactive map of San Jerónimo District
- Country: Peru
- Region: Apurímac
- Province: Andahuaylas
- Capital: San Jerónimo

Government
  - Mayor: Oscar David Rojas Palomino

Area
  - Total: 237.42 km^{2} (91.67 sq mi)
- Elevation: 2,944 m (9,659 ft)

Population (2005 census)
  - Total: 17,220
  - Density: 72.53/km^{2} (187.9/sq mi)
- Time zone: UTC-5 (PET)
- UBIGEO: 030213

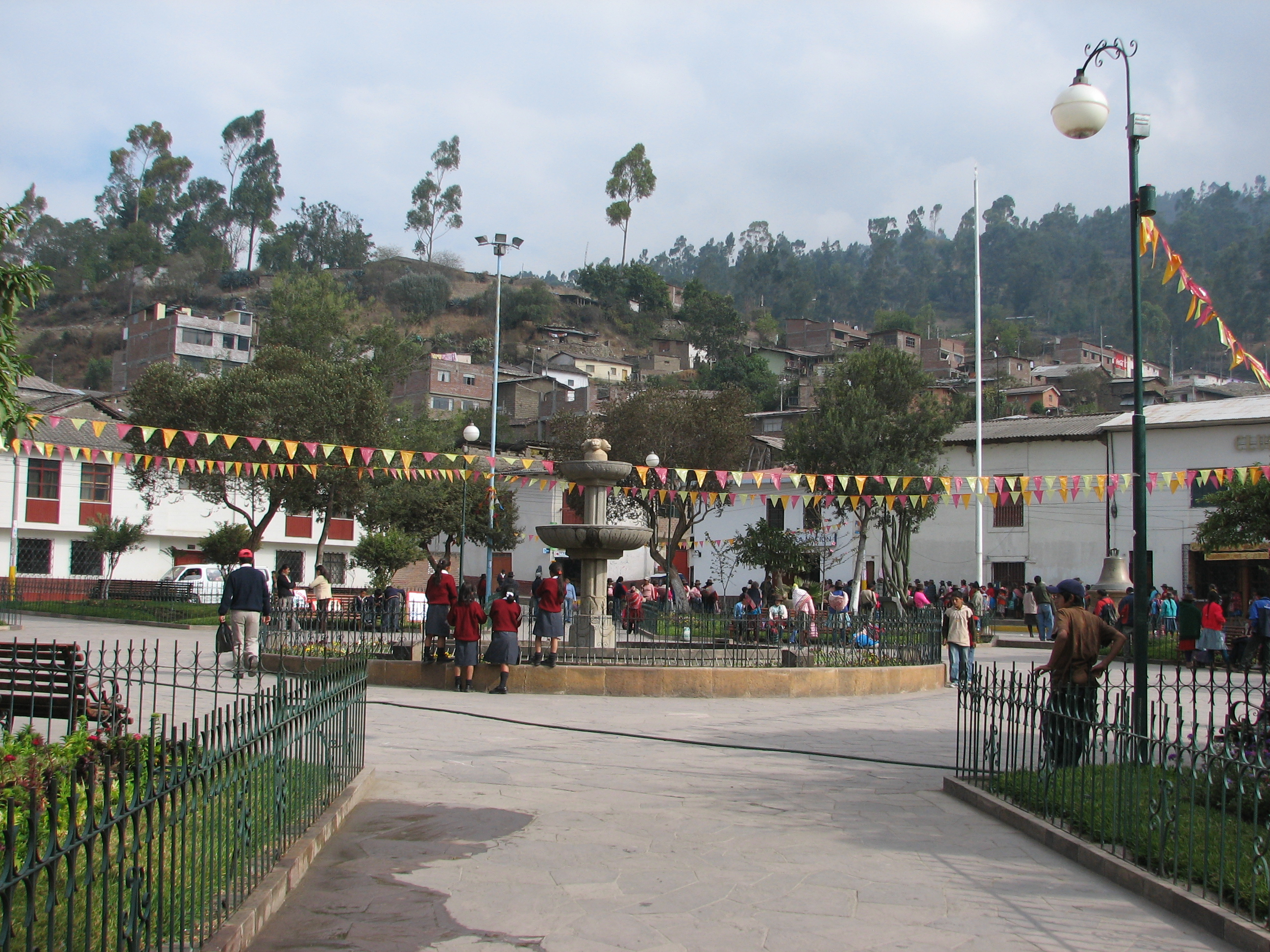
Plaza de Armas, San Jerónimo, Andahuaylas Province.

San Jerónimo District is one of the nineteen districts of the Andahuaylas Province in Peru.

== Geography ==
One of the highest peaks of the district is Sallapi at approximately 4,800 m (15,700 ft). Other mountains are listed below:

- Aya Mach'ay
- Chunta Willka
- Ch'aki Kancha
- Kuntur Pampa
- Kuntur Sinqa
- Puka Wanaku
- Pukar
- Pukayuq
- Puma Urqu
- Puyunku
- Tapan Ichhu
- Wachwalla
- Wanqan
- Wayllayuq

== Ethnic groups ==
The people in the district are mainly indigenous citizens of Quechua descent. Quechua is the language which the majority of the population (69.26%) learnt to speak in childhood, 30.47% of the residents started speaking using the Spanish language (2007 Peru Census).

== Climate ==
Climate data for Andahuaylas City, elevation 2,981 m (9,780 ft), (1991–2020)
Month	Jan	Feb	Mar	Apr	May	Jun	Jul	Aug	Sep	Oct	Nov	Dec	Year
Mean daily maximum °C (°F)	20.2 (68.4)	19.8 (67.6)	19.7 (67.5)	20.1 (68.2)	20.4 (68.7)	19.8 (67.6)	19.5 (67.1)	20.0 (68.0)	20.6 (69.1)	21.4 (70.5)	22.3 (72.1)	21.2 (70.2)	20.4 (68.8)
Mean daily minimum °C (°F)	9.4 (48.9)	9.6 (49.3)	9.2 (48.6)	7.7 (45.9)	5.1 (41.2)	4.2 (39.6)	3.7 (38.7)	5.0 (41.0)	7.0 (44.6)	8.0 (46.4)	8.5 (47.3)	9.3 (48.7)	7.2 (45.0)
Average precipitation mm (inches)	131.9 (5.19)	128.5 (5.06)	103.8 (4.09)	38.4 (1.51)	17.0 (0.67)	7.2 (0.28)	11.3 (0.44)	17.9 (0.70)	26.4 (1.04)	48.0 (1.89)	50.1 (1.97)	92.8 (3.65)	673.3 (26.49)
Source: National Meteorology and Hydrology Service of Peru

== See also ==
- Antaqucha
- Llamachayuq
- Quriqucha
- Wachuqucha
