= Usnu, Ayacucho =

Archaeological site in Peru

Usnu
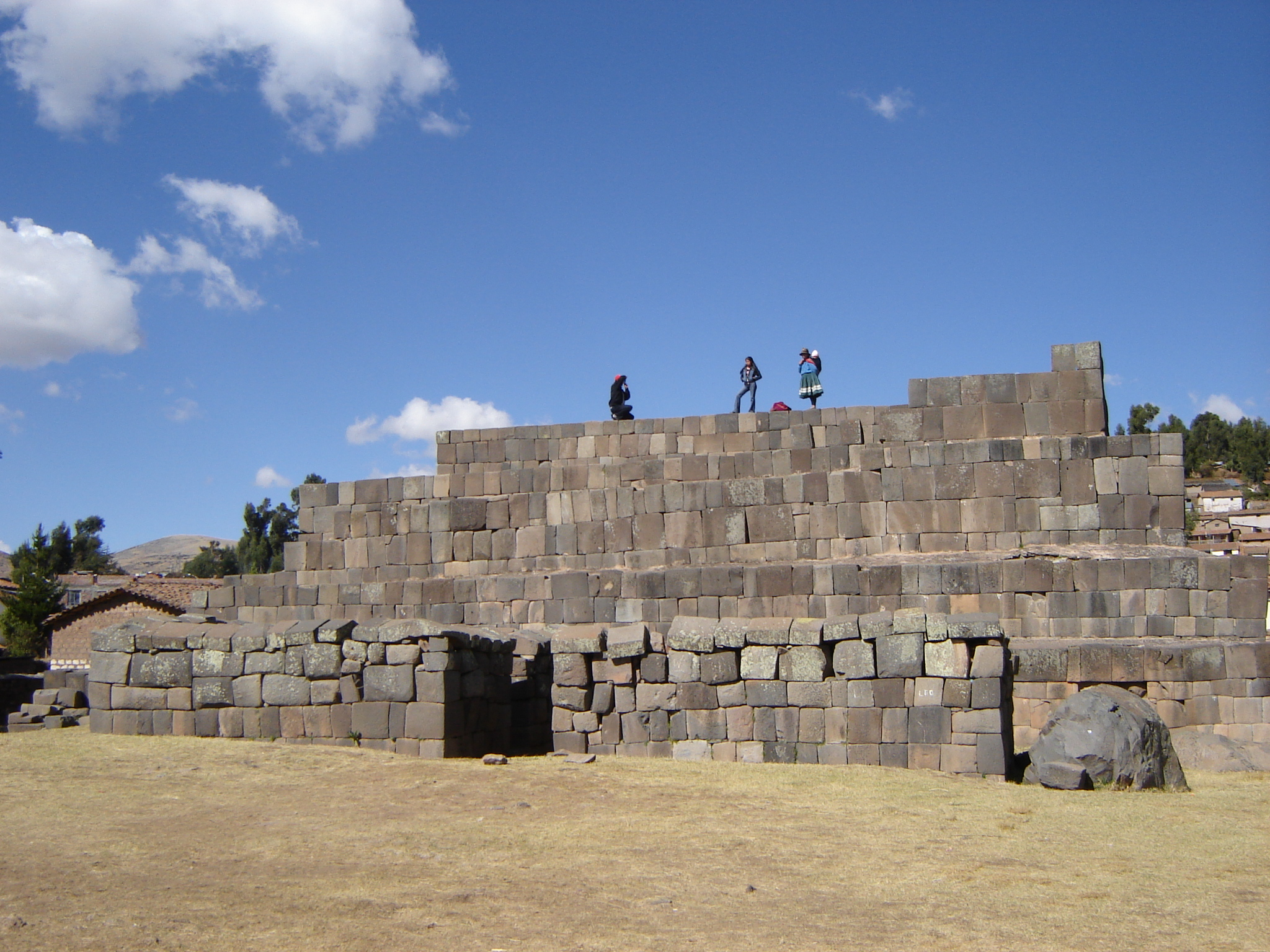

- Location within Peru
- 13.6527°S 73.9551°W
- Location: Peru, Ayacucho Region, Vilcas Huamán Province
- Region: Andes

Usnu (Quechua for altar / a special platform for important celebrations, also spelled Ushno) is an archaeological site in Peru. It is located in the Ayacucho Region, Vilcas Huamán Province, Vilcas Huamán District, in the town Vilcashuamán. The site was declared a National Cultural Heritage (Patrimonio Cultural) of Peru on April 11, 2000.

Leon states Vilcas was a principal and very important place in the Incan kingdom. "There were beautiful buildings and a temple with great wealth." The natives, "burned the most important of them and removed the sacred women and treasures so that the Spaniards could not take advantage of them. Two royal highways, if not three, lead from this [place] that they call Vilcas."
