= Santa María de Chicmo District =

Coordinates: 13°39′22″S 73°29′35″W

Santa María de Chicmo
- District
- Interactive map of Santa María de Chicmo
- Country: Peru
- Region: Apurímac
- Province: Andahuaylas
- Founded: December 11, 1964
- Capital: Santa María de Chicmo

Government
  - Mayor: Herminio Ortiz Guizado

Area
  - Total: 162.14 km^{2} (62.60 sq mi)
- Elevation: 3,262 m (10,702 ft)

Population (2005 census)
  - Total: 10,643
  - Density: 65.641/km^{2} (170.01/sq mi)
- Time zone: UTC-5 (PET)
- UBIGEO: 030215

Santa María de Chicmo District is one of the nineteen districts of the province Andahuaylas in Peru.

== Ethnic groups ==
The people in the district are mainly indigenous citizens of Quechua descent. Quechua is the language which the majority of the population (84.22%) learnt to speak in childhood, 15.41% of the residents started speaking using the Spanish language (2007 Peru Census).

== See also ==
- Chiri Yaku
