= Pacucha District =

Coordinates: 13°36′29″S 73°20′38″W

Pacucha
- District
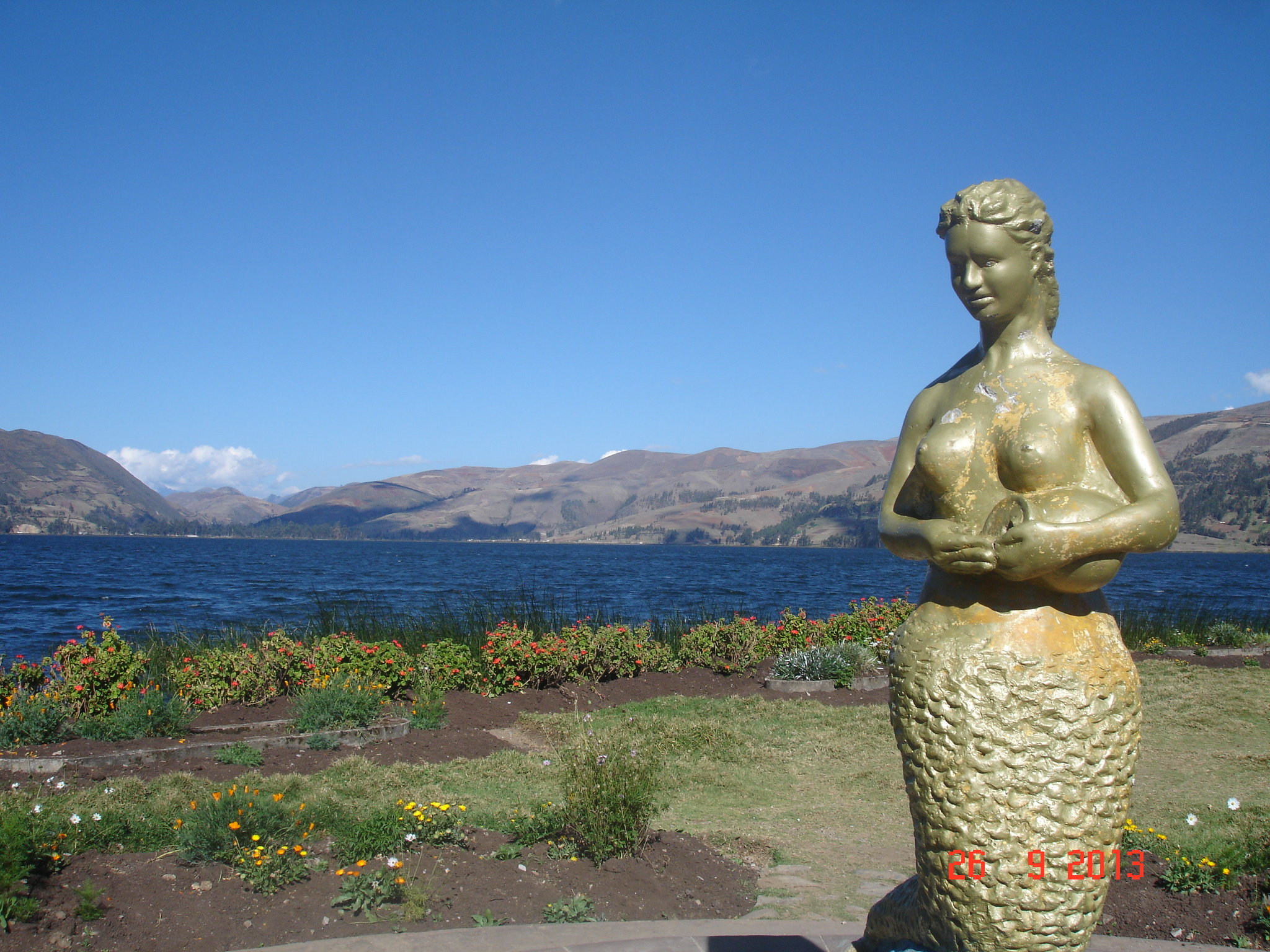
- Pacucha Lagoon
- Interactive map of Pacucha
- Country: Peru
- Region: Apurímac
- Province: Andahuaylas
- Founded: August 21, 1963
- Capital: Pacucha

Government
  - Mayor: Oscar Franco Navarro

Area
  - Total: 170.39 km^{2} (65.79 sq mi)
- Elevation: 3,125 m (10,253 ft)

Population (2005 census)
  - Total: 10,018
  - Density: 58.795/km^{2} (152.28/sq mi)
- Time zone: UTC-5 (PET)
- UBIGEO: 030209

Pacucha District is one of the nineteen districts of the province Andahuaylas in Peru.

== Ethnic groups ==
The people in the district are mainly indigenous citizens of Quechua descent. Quechua is the language which the majority of the population (91.50%) learnt to speak in childhood, 8.15% of the residents started speaking using the Spanish language (2007 Peru Census).

== See also ==
- Sóndor – an archeological site in Pacucha District
