= Tumay Huaraca District =

Coordinates: 13°39′02″S 73°23′26″W

Tumay Huaraca
- District
- Interactive map of Tumay Huaraca
- Country: Peru
- Region: Apurímac
- Province: Andahuaylas
- Founded: December 29, 1964
- Capital: Umamarca

Government
  - Mayor: Rufino Edgay Taipe Romani

Area
  - Total: 446.71 km^{2} (172.48 sq mi)
- Elevation: 3,369 m (11,053 ft)

Population (2005 census)
  - Total: 1,907
  - Density: 4.269/km^{2} (11.06/sq mi)
- Time zone: UTC-5 (PET)
- UBIGEO: 030217

Tumay Huaraca District is one of the nineteen districts of the Andahuaylas Province in Peru.

== Geography ==
One of the highest peaks of the district is Puka T'uruyuq at approximately 4,400 m (14,400 ft). Other mountains are listed below:

- Anka Silla
- Aqu Urqu
- Awki Marka
- Chaku
- Chipana Wayq'u
- Chhurku Rumi
- Ch'aki Qucha
- Ch'aki Qucha Pata
- Ichhu Urqu
- Inti Ruphasqa
- Kuntur Pampa
- Kunturillu
- Parqu
- Puma Pukyu
- Punta Pata
- P'isaqayuq
- Qillwa
- Qillwa Qucha
- Qucha Urqu
- Saywa
- Sinqa Urqu
- Supay Urqu
- Wamp'u
- Waylla Q'asa
- Wit'u
- Yuraq Q'asa

== Ethnic groups ==
The people in the district are mainly indigenous citizens of Quechua descent. Quechua is the language which the majority of the population (94.53%) learnt to speak in childhood, 5.07% of the residents started speaking using the Spanish language (2007 Peru Census).

== See also ==
- Awkimarka
