= Vilcashuamán =

Archaeological site in Peru

Vilcashuamán Willka Waman (Quechua)
- Town
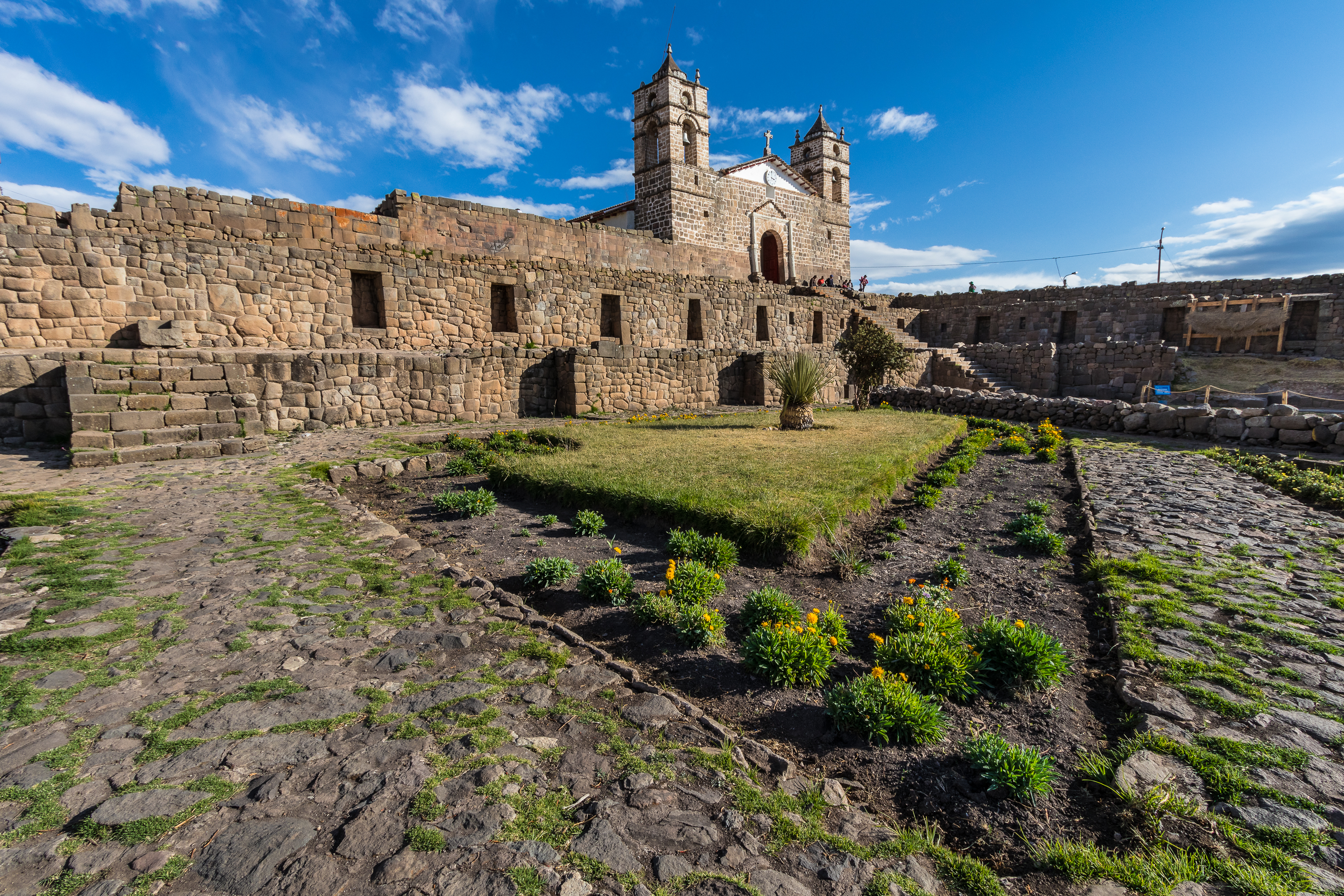
- Vilcashuamán Cathedral and the Temple of the Sun

- Location within Peru
- Coordinates: 13.65311°S 73.95396°W
- Country: Peru
- Region: Ayacucho
- Province: Vilcas Huamán
- Elevation: 3,490 m (11,450 ft)

Population (2017)
  - Total: 2,577

Vilcashuamán or Vilcasguaman (from Quechua Willka Waman, "sacred hawk") is the capital of Vilcas Huamán Province, Ayacucho region, Peru. It is located at an altitude of 3,490 m on the eastern slopes of the Andes. It is located on an ancient archaeological site.

Vilcashuamán was an Inca administrative center, established after the Incas conquered the Chancas and the Pocras. According to the Chronicler Pedro Cieza de León, Vilcashuamán was home to 4 people. The city was located around a large plaza where ceremonies involving sacrifices were performed, usually camelids or libation of corn wine. Around this plaza were the city's two most important buildings: the Sun Temple (Templo del Sol) and the Ushnu which remain to this day. It is believed that the city had the shape of a falcon, in which the Ushnu was located in the head.

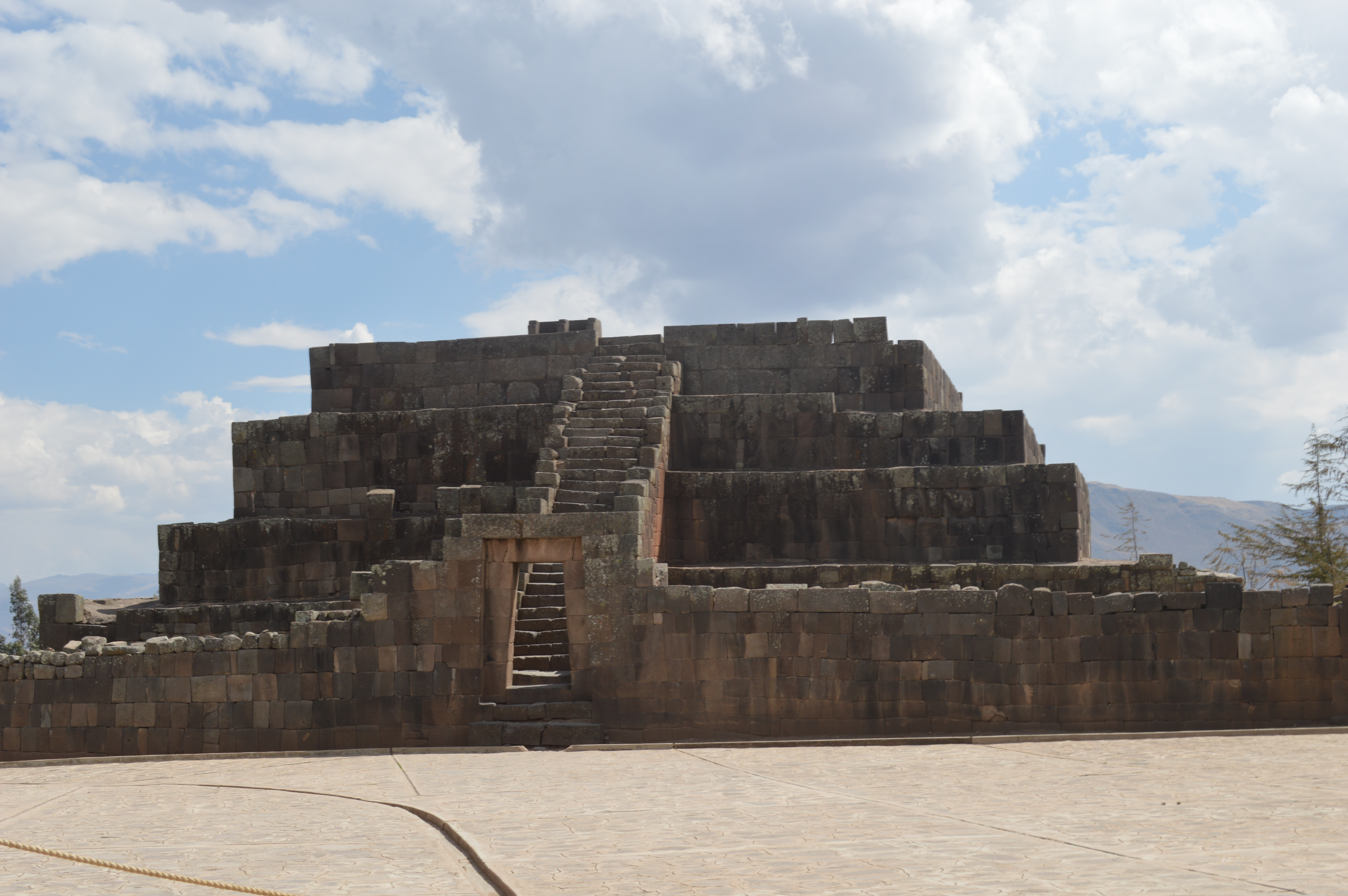
The Vilcashuamán Usnu seen form the East side with the entrance gate and the stairway

The Ushnu is a truncated pyramid which is accessed through a double doorjamb, characteristic of the most important compounds. In its upper platform is a large stone with unique carvings that is known as the Seat of the Inca (Asiento del Inca); this seat, according to Cieza de León, was once covered with gold leaf.

== Climate ==
Climate data for Vilcashuamán, elevation 3,518 m (11,542 ft), (1991–2020)
Month	Jan	Feb	Mar	Apr	May	Jun	Jul	Aug	Sep	Oct	Nov	Dec	Year
Mean daily maximum °C (°F)	17.5 (63.5)	17.5 (63.5)	17.2 (63.0)	17.5 (63.5)	17.8 (64.0)	17.4 (63.3)	17.1 (62.8)	17.7 (63.9)	17.9 (64.2)	18.9 (66.0)	19.5 (67.1)	18.3 (64.9)	17.9 (64.1)
Mean daily minimum °C (°F)	5.5 (41.9)	5.6 (42.1)	5.6 (42.1)	4.3 (39.7)	1.5 (34.7)	0.5 (32.9)	0.1 (32.2)	1.2 (34.2)	3.0 (37.4)	3.4 (38.1)	4.0 (39.2)	5.2 (41.4)	3.3 (38.0)
Average precipitation mm (inches)	150.7 (5.93)	154.7 (6.09)	120.1 (4.73)	37.3 (1.47)	10.9 (0.43)	5.5 (0.22)	7.6 (0.30)	13.5 (0.53)	21.8 (0.86)	31.7 (1.25)	49.8 (1.96)	102.2 (4.02)	705.8 (27.79)
Source: National Meteorology and Hydrology Service of Peru
