= Andahuaylas province =

Coordinates: 13°39′12″S 73°23′18″W

Andahuaylas
- Province
- Flag Coat of arms

- Location of Andahuaylas in the Apurímac Region
- Country: Peru
- Region: Apurímac
- Founded: June 21, 1825
- Capital: Andahuaylas

Government
  - Mayor: Victor Manuel Molina Quintana (2007)

Area
  - Total: 3,987.00 km^{2} (1,539.39 sq mi)

Population
  - Total: 142,140
  - Density: 35.651/km^{2} (92.335/sq mi)
- UBIGEO: 0302
- Website: www.muniandahuaylas.gob.pe

Andahuaylas is the second largest of the seven provinces of the Apurímac Region in Peru. The capital of the province is the city of Andahuaylas. The province is located in the north-western part of the region and measures 3,987.00 square kilometres (1,539.39 sq mi).

== Boundaries ==
- North: province of Chincheros and Ayacucho Region
- East: provinces of Abancay and Aymaraes
- South: Ayacucho Region
- West: Ayacucho Region

== Geography ==
One of the highest peaks of the province is Sallapi at approximately 4,800 m (15,700 ft). Other mountains are listed below:

- Aqu Urqu
- Chiri Yaku
- Huch'uy Qillqa Urqu
- Kuntur Pampa
- Kuntur Wachana
- Puka Wanaku
- Puma Urqu
- Puyunku
- P'isaqayuq
- Qillqa
- Qillwa Qucha
- Quchayuq
- Saqsa Waman
- Tumiri
- Wamanilla
- Waylla Qucha
- Wayllachayuq
- Waytarayuq
- Wisk'achaniyuq

Some of the largest lakes in the province are Antaqucha, Quriqucha, Suqtaqucha, Suyt'uqucha and Wachuqucha.

== Political division ==
The province of Andahuaylas is divided into nineteen districts, which are:

District	Mayor
Andahuaylas	Victor Manuel Molina Quintana
Andarapa	Agapito Leguia Guzman
Chiara	Gabino Cartolin Altamirano
Huancarama	Carlos Cavero Contreras
Huancaray	Macedonio Martin Mallcco Matute
Huayana	Hermelinda Pareja Urpi
Kaquiabamba	Ruben Vivanco Ccoicca
Kishuara	Ruben Moises Hurtado Vera
Pacobamba	Fredy Trocones Villcas
Pacucha	Oscar Franco Navarro
Pampachiri	Wilfredo Cirilo Chipana Fernandez
Pomacocha	Abelardo Ccaccya Ccopa
San Antonio de Cachi	Esteban Astuquillca Arcce
San Jerónimo	Oscar David Rojas Palomino
San Miguel de Chaccrapampa	Felix Vargas Loa
Santa María de Chicmo	Herminio Ortiz Guizado
Talavera	Juan Ricardo Reynoso Gutierrez
Tumay Huaraca	Rufino Edgay Taipe Romani
Turpo	Antonio Beltran Sanchez
José María Arguedas	N

== Ethnic groups ==
The people in the province are mainly indigenous citizens of Quechua descent. Quechua is the language which the majority of the population (73.54%) learnt to speak in childhood, 26.09% of the residents started speaking using the Spanish language and 0.19% using Aymara (2007 Peru Census).

== Archaeology ==
Some of the most important archaeological sites in the province are Awkimarka, Llamachayuq and Suntur.
