= Huancaray District =

Coordinates: 13°46′15″S 73°32′12″W

Huancaray Wankaray
- District
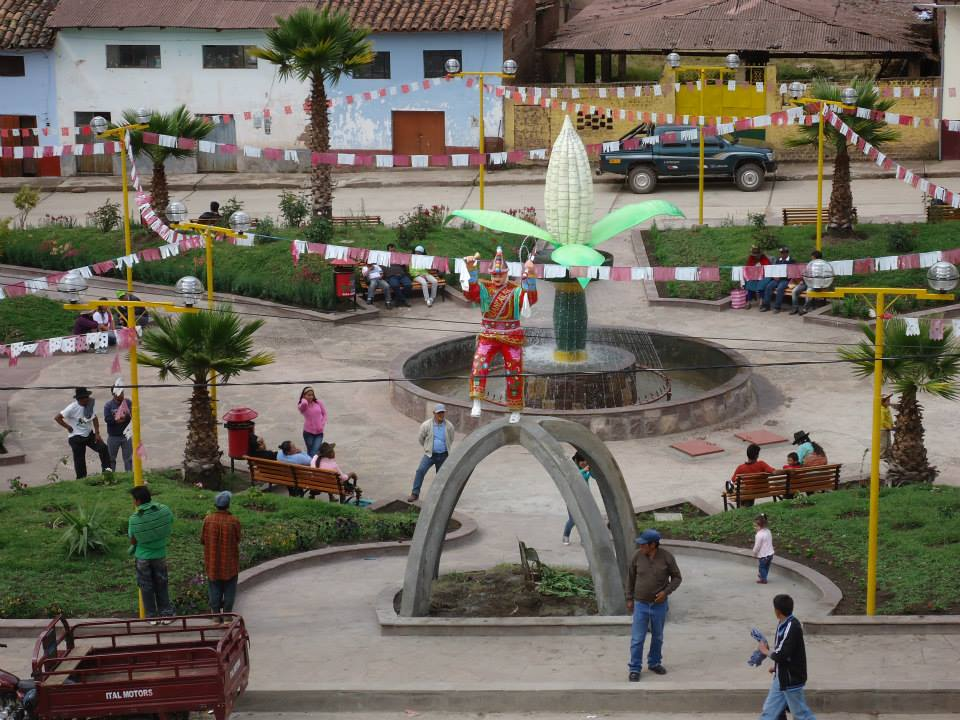
- Square of Huancaray
- Interactive map of Huancaray
- Country: Peru
- Region: Apurímac
- Province: Andahuaylas
- Capital: Huancaray

Government
  - Mayor: Macedonio Martin Mallcco Matute

Area
  - Total: 112.2 km^{2} (43.3 sq mi)
- Elevation: 2,902 m (9,521 ft)

Population (2005 census)
  - Total: 4,775
  - Density: 42.56/km^{2} (110.2/sq mi)
- Time zone: UTC-5 (PET)
- UBIGEO: 030205

Huancaray (from Quechua Wankaray, meaning "to gobble") is one of the nineteen districts of the Andahuaylas Province in Peru.

== Geography ==
One of the highest peaks of the district is Wamanripa at approximately 4,200 m (13,800 ft). Other mountains are listed below:

- Aqu Urqu
- Arpa Kancha
- Chipaw
- Chiri Yaku
- Ch'iqchi
- Hatun Wasi
- Qillqa
- Waman Tiyana
- Wamp'u

== Ethnic groups ==
The people in the district are mainly indigenous citizens of Quechua descent. Quechua is the language which the majority of the population (89.23%) learnt to speak in childhood, 10.23% of the residents started speaking using the Spanish language (2007 Peru Census).
