= Antaqucha (Apurímac) =

Lake in Andahuaylas Province, Peru

- Location within Peru
- Location: Apurímac Region, Andahuaylas Province, San Jerónimo District
- Coordinates: 13°46′5″S 73°13′24″W
- Basin countries: Peru

Antaqucha (Quechua anta copper, qucha lake, "copper lake", Hispanicized spelling Antaccocha) is a lake in Peru. It is situated in the Apurímac Region, Andahuaylas Province, San Jerónimo District, southwest of the mountain Puka Wanaku (Quechua for "red guanaco", Hispanicized Pucahuanaco).

== See also ==
- List of lakes in Peru
