= Laksha Warina =

Mountain in Peru

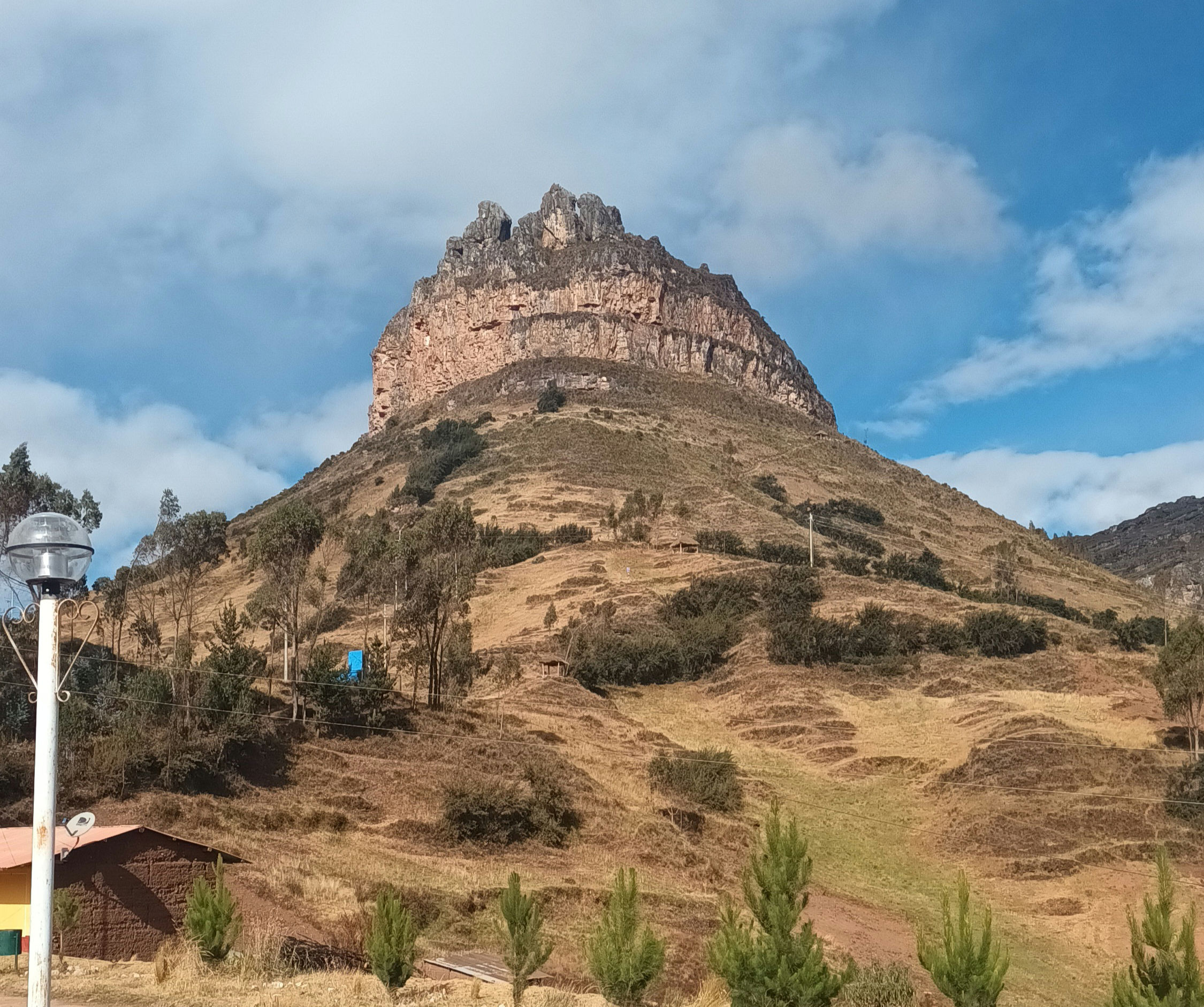
- Laksha Warina as seen from Ayap'itiq (Ayapiteg)

Highest point
- Elevation: 4,281 m (14,045 ft)
- Coordinates: 9°52′5.34″S 76°31′43.86″W

Geography
- Location within Peru
- Location: Peru, Huánuco Region, Yarowilca Province

Laksha Warina, Lakshawarina, Llaksha Warina or Llakshawarina (Quechua, Hispanicized Lacshahuarina, Lacsha Huarina, Llacshahuarina, Llacsha Huarina), also known as Corona del Inca (Spanish for "crown of the Inca"), is a mountain in Peru. Its summit reaches 4,281 metres (14,045 ft) above sea level. The mountain is situated in the Huánuco Region, Yarowilca Province, on the border of the districts Chavinillo, Choras and Jacas Chico.

== See also ==
- T'akaq
- Waruq
