= Ambo =

Ambo may refer to:

== Places ==
- Ambo, Kiribati
- Ambō (also spelled Anbō), Kagoshima Prefecture, Japan
- Ambo Province, Huanuco Region, Peru
  - Ambo District
  - Ambo, Peru, capital of Ambo District
- Ambo, Ethiopia, a capital of West Shewa Zone, Oromia Regional State, Ethiopia
- Kom Ombo or Ambo, a town in Egypt known for its ancient Greek temple
- Wendens Ambo, village in Essex, England

== Religion ==
- Ambo (liturgy) or ambon, in Eastern orthodoxy the elevated area in front of the Iconostasis
- Ambo, a pulpit or lectern in a church sanctuary (the official term for Catholic pulpits)

== Anthropology ==
- Ovambo language, or Ambo language
- Ovambo people, or Ambo people

== Arts, entertainment, and media ==
- "Ambo", an episode of the American television series Animal Kingdom
- Ambo, a music project of computer game designer Robyn Miller

== Other uses ==
- Typhoon Ambo (disambiguation)
- Ambo, in Australia, a term for an ambulance
- Ambo, a variety of potato
- Ambo, an operation in Conway polyhedron notation
- Ambo Declaration, adopted at the Tarawa Climate Change Conference in November 2010
- Ambo Mineral Water or Ambo wuha, a carbonated bottled mineral water from the town of Ambo, Ethiopia
- AMBO pipeline, a planned oil pipeline to be built and operated by the US-registered Albanian Macedonian Bulgarian Oil Corporation
