= Rikacha Tuna =

Mountain in Peru

- Location within Peru

Highest point
- Elevation: 4,400 m (14,400 ft)
- Coordinates: 10°23′37″S 76°00′53″W

Geography
- Location: Peru, Huánuco Region
- Parent range: Andes

Rikacha Tuna (Quechua rikacha Arracacia xanthorrhiza, tuna slope, "rikacha slope", Hispanicized spelling Ricachatuna) is a 4,400-metre-high (14,400 ft) mountain in the Andes of Peru. It is located in the Pachitea Province, Panao District. Rikacha Tuna lies northeast of K'uchu Hanka.
