= Panao District =

Coordinates: 9.8986°S 75.9929°W

Panao Panaw
- District
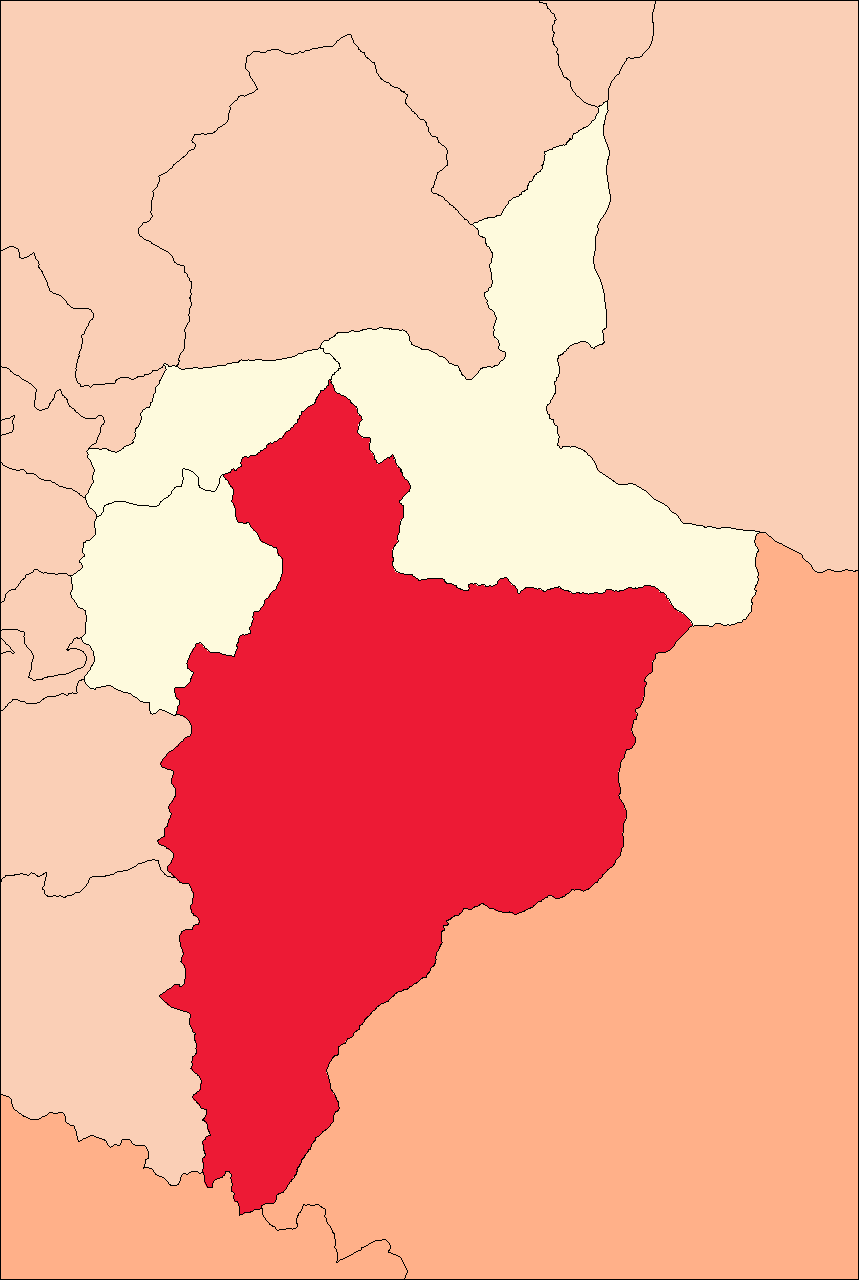
- District of Panao (Peru)
- Interactive map of Panao
- Country: Peru
- Region: Huánuco
- Province: Pachitea
- Capital: Panao

Government
  - Mayor: Cayo Rojas Rivera

Area
  - Total: 1,580.86 km^{2} (610.37 sq mi)
- Elevation: 2,560 m (8,400 ft)

Population (2005 census)
  - Total: 17,666
  - Density: 11.175/km^{2} (28.943/sq mi)
- Time zone: UTC-5 (PET)
- UBIGEO: 100801

Panao District is one of four districts of the province Pachitea in Peru.

== Geography ==
Some of the highest mountains of the district are listed below:

- Hatun Kasha
- K'uchu Hanka
- Marayniyuq
- Putaqa
- Qayqu
- Rikacha Tuna
- Rumi Chaka
- Saqra Mach'ay
- Suyruqucha
- Tinyaqucha
- Walmish
- Wamanripayuq
- Warmi Pukyu
- Waqurunchu

== Ethnic groups ==
The people in the district are mainly indigenous citizens of Quechua descent. Quechua is the language which the majority of the population (57.01%) learnt to speak in childhood, 42.69% of the residents started speaking using the Spanish language (2007 Peru Census).
