= Choras District =

Coordinates: 9.9115°S 76.6062°W

Choras
- District
- Interactive map of Choras
- Country: Peru
- Region: Huánuco
- Province: Yarowilca
- Founded: February 2, 2001
- Capital: Choras, Peru

Government
  - Mayor: Oriol Armando Hermosilla Esteban

Area
  - Total: 61.14 km^{2} (23.61 sq mi)
- Elevation: 3,532 m (11,588 ft)

Population (2005 census)
  - Total: 4,207
  - Density: 68.81/km^{2} (178.2/sq mi)
- Time zone: UTC-5 (PET)
- UBIGEO: 101108

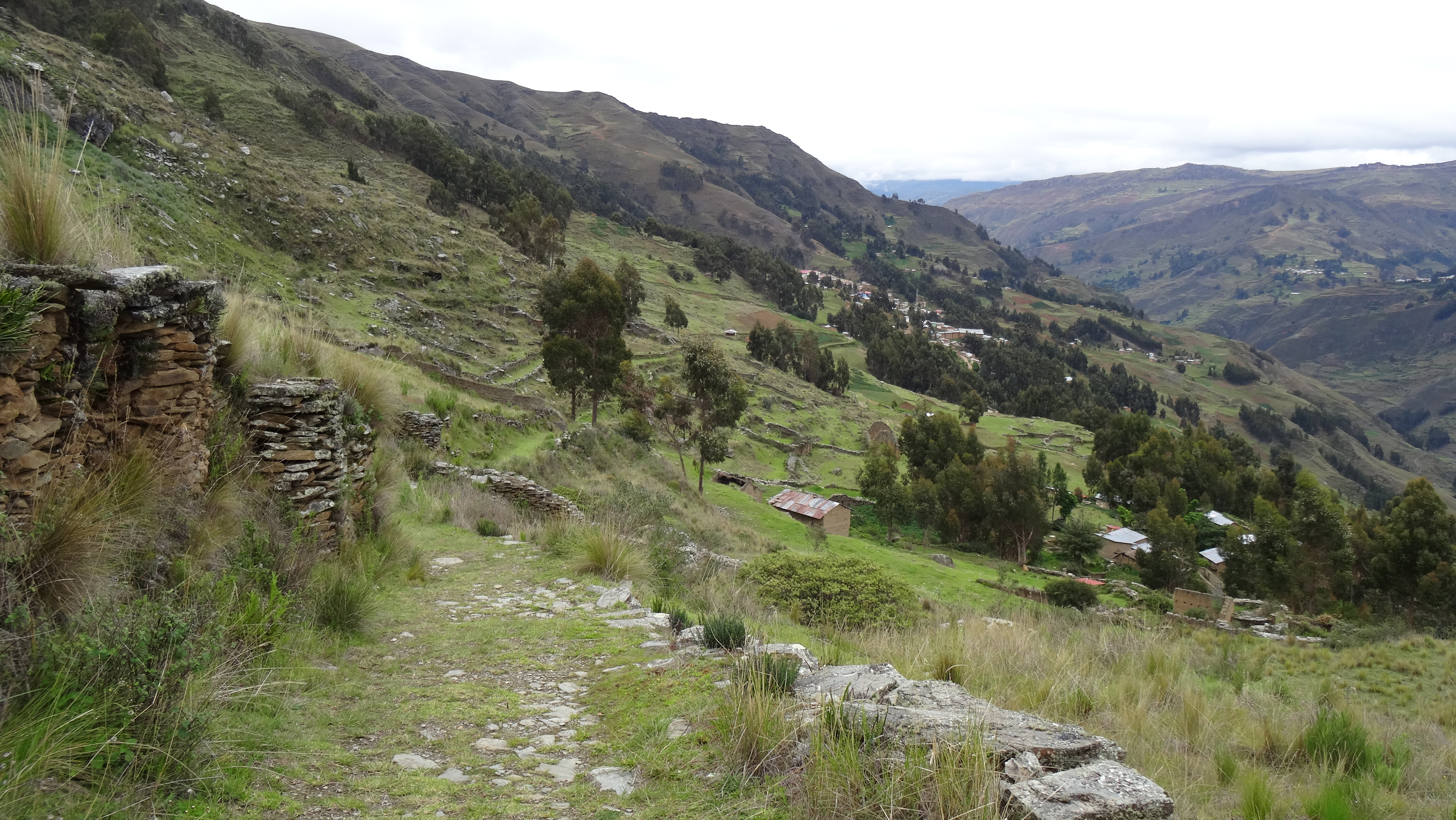
Part of the Choras District

Choras District is one of eight districts of the province Yarowilca in Peru.

== Ethnic groups ==
The people in the district are mainly indigenous citizens of Quechua descent. The Quechua languages are the languages which the majority of the population (64.40%) learnt to speak in childhood, 35.45% of the residents started speaking using the Spanish language (2007 Peru Census).

== See also ==
- Laksha Warina
