= Tuqtuqucha Punta =

Mountain in Peru

- Location within Peru

Highest point
- Elevation: 4,400 m (14,400 ft)
- Coordinates: 9°44′25″S 76°29′01″W

Geography
- Location: Huánuco Region
- Parent range: Andes

Tuqtuqucha Punta (Quechua tuqtu broody hen, qucha lake, punta peak; ridge; first, before, in front of, "hen lake peak", also spelled Tuctococha Punta) is a mountain in the Andes of Peru which reaches a height of approximately 4,400 m (14,400 ft). It is located in the Huánuco Region, Huánuco Province, Santa María del Valle District, and in the Yarowilca Province, on the border of the districts of Aparicio Pomares and Chavinillo. It lies north of a lake named Tuqtuqucha.
