= San Francisco District, Ambo =

Coordinates: 10.3470°S 76.2868°W

San Francisco District
- District
- Interactive map of San Francisco District
- Country: Peru
- Region: Huánuco
- Province: Ambo
- Founded: September 21, 1943
- Capital: Mosca

Government
  - Mayor: Cesar Morales Negrete

Area
  - Total: 121.21 km^{2} (46.80 sq mi)
- Elevation: 3,500 m (11,500 ft)

Population (2005 census)
  - Total: 3,673
  - Density: 30.30/km^{2} (78.48/sq mi)
- Time zone: UTC-5 (PET)
- UBIGEO: 100206

San Francisco District is one of eight districts of the province Ambo in Peru.
