= Huichún =

Archaeological site in Peru

- Location: Yarowilca Province, Huánuco

Huichún (possibly from Quechua wich'un femur) is an archaeological site in Peru. The National Institute of Culture declared it a National Cultural Heritage by Resolución Directoral No. 1572 on September 27, 2006. The site consists of houses, stone tombs (chullpa), deposits (qullqa) and enclosures.

Huichún is situated in the village of Cochamarca about 8 km from the town of Obas. It lies in the Huánuco Region, Yarowilca Province, Obas District

== See also ==
- Awkillu Waqra
- Wallpayunka
