= Ambo District =

Coordinates: 10.1333°S 76.2000°W

Ambo
- District
- Interactive map of Ambo
- Country: Peru
- Region: Huánuco
- Province: Ambo
- Founded: October 21, 1912
- Capital: Ambo

Government
  - Mayor: Concepcion Eusebio Palacios Briceño

Area
  - Total: 288.8 km^{2} (111.5 sq mi)
- Elevation: 2,064 m (6,772 ft)

Population (2005 census)
  - Total: 15,778
  - Density: 54.63/km^{2} (141.5/sq mi)
- Time zone: UTC-5 (PET)
- UBIGEO: 100201

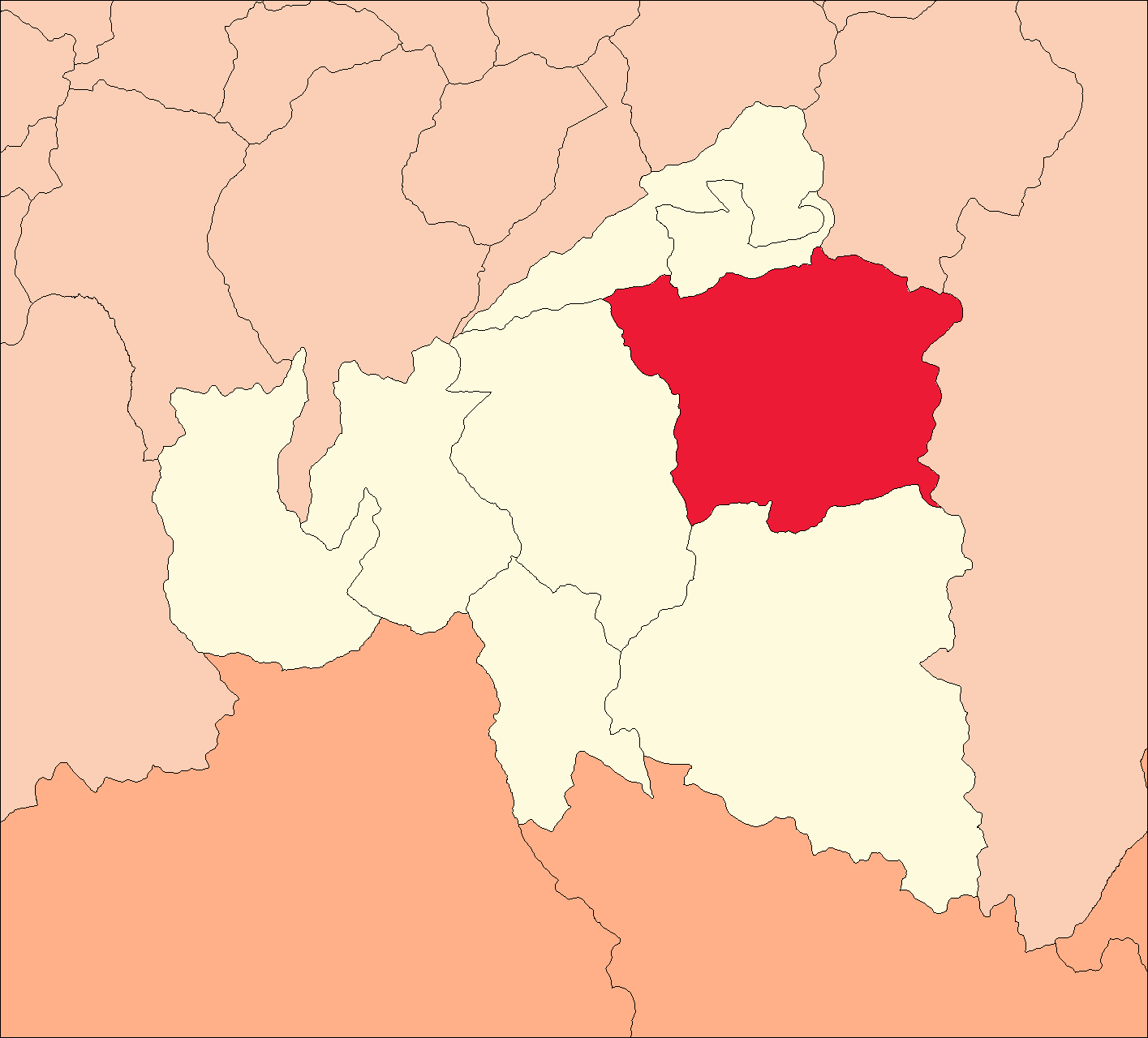
Location and extent of Ambo in Ambo Province

Ambo District is one of eight districts of the Ambo Province in Peru.

== Geography ==
One of the highest peaks of the district is P'aqla Tanka at approximately 4,800 m (15,700 ft). Other mountains are listed below:

- Aklla Kancha
- Kushuru Punta
- Kushuruyuq
- Ñawin
- Putaqa
- P'unqu
- Rumi Chaka
- Taruka
- Yana Hirka
- Yana Qucha

== See also ==
- Hatun Uchku
- Yanaqucha
