= Hatun Uchku =

Archaeological site in Peru

- Location within Peru
- 10°7′54.84″S 76°12′6.84″W
- Location: Peru, Huánuco Region, Ambo Province

Site notes
- Height: 2,206 metres (7,238 ft)

Hatun Uchku (Quechua hatun big, uchku hole, pit "big hole" or "big pit", Hispanicized spelling Jatun Uchco) is a cave with archaeological and paleontological remains in Peru. It was declared a National Cultural Heritage by Resolución Directoral No. 441/INC on May 23, 2002. Hatun Uchku is situated in the Huánuco Region, Ambo Province, Ambo District, about 500 m south of the main square of Ambo, at a height of 2,206 metres (7,238 ft).
