= Cayna District =

Coordinates: 10.2112°S 76.4151°W

Cayna
- District
- Interactive map of Cayna
- Country: Peru
- Region: Huánuco
- Province: Ambo
- Founded: January 2, 1857
- Capital: Cayna

Government
  - Mayor: Elmer Jorge Davila Daga

Area
  - Total: 166.05 km^{2} (64.11 sq mi)
- Elevation: 3,316 m (10,879 ft)

Population (2005 census)
  - Total: 4,136
  - Density: 24.91/km^{2} (64.51/sq mi)
- Time zone: UTC-5 (PET)
- UBIGEO: 100202

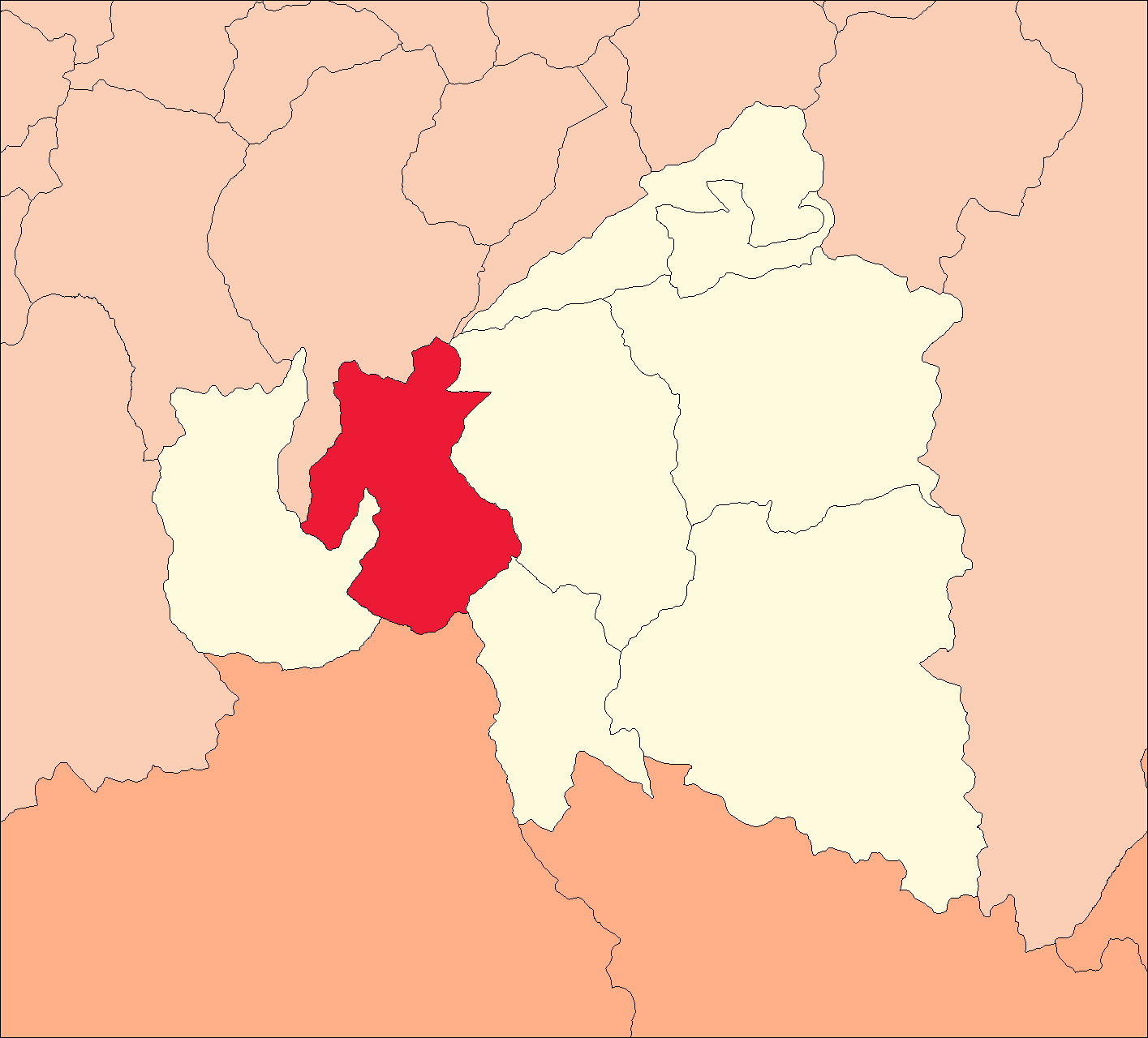

Cayna District is one of eight districts of the province Ambo in Peru.
