= Umari District =

Coordinates: 9.8614°S 76.0422°W

Umari
- District
- Interactive map of Umari
- Country: Peru
- Region: Huánuco
- Province: Pachitea
- Founded: November 29, 1918
- Capital: Umari

Government
  - Mayor: Alcides Blas Garcia Durand

Area
  - Total: 149.08 km^{2} (57.56 sq mi)
- Elevation: 2,500 m (8,200 ft)

Population (2005 census)
  - Total: 12,915
  - Density: 86.631/km^{2} (224.37/sq mi)
- Time zone: UTC-5 (PET)
- UBIGEO: 100804

Umari District is one of four districts of the province Pachitea in Peru.

== See also ==
- Usnu
