= Hualpayunca =

Archaeological site in Peru

Coordinates: 9.7725°S 76.6482°W

- Location within Peru
- Location: Peru; Huánuco Region, Yarowilca Province

Hualpayunca (possibly from Quechua wallpa hen, yunka warm area on the slopes of the Andes) is an archaeological site located in Peru, specifically in the Obas District, region of Huánuco, above the village of Hualpayunca, at an elevation of ca. Due to its high altitude, it serves as a nesting site for several condors. The site is situated at approximately 3,800 metres (12,467 ft).

== See also ==
- Awkillu Waqra
- Huichún
