= Ambon =

Ambon may refer to:

== Places ==
- Ambon Island, an island in Indonesia
  - Ambon, Maluku, a city on Ambon Island, the capital of Maluku province
  - Governorate of Ambon, a colony of the Dutch East India Company from 1605 to 1796
- Ambon, Morbihan, a commune in Morbihan, France

== Other uses ==
- Ambon (liturgy), the place directly in front of the Holy Doors of an Eastern Orthodox Church
- Battle of Ambon, a World War II battle between Allied and Japanese forces which occurred on the island in 1942

== See also ==
- Ambo (disambiguation)
- Ambon white-eye, a species of bird
