= Aparicio Pomares District =

Coordinates: 9.6985°S 76.6484°W

Aparicio Pomares
- District
- Interactive map of Aparicio Pomares
- Country: Peru
- Region: Huánuco
- Province: Yarowilca
- Founded: January 2, 1857
- Capital: Chupan

Government
  - Mayor: Alfredo Angel Isidro Silvestre

Area
  - Total: 183.14 km^{2} (70.71 sq mi)
- Elevation: 3,416 m (11,207 ft)

Population (2005 census)
  - Total: 8,993
  - Density: 49.10/km^{2} (127.2/sq mi)
- Time zone: UTC-5 (PET)
- UBIGEO: 101104

Aparicio Pomares District is one of eight districts of the province Yarowilca in Peru.

== Ethnic groups ==
The people in the district are mainly indigenous citizens of Quechua descent. Quechua is the language which the majority of the population (78.14%) learnt to speak in childhood, 21.48% of the residents started speaking using the Spanish language (2007 Peru Census).

== See also ==
- Atuq Wachanan
- Kimsa Ukru Punta
- Qullqa Punta
- Tuqtuqucha Punta
