= Colpas District =

Coordinates: 10.2645°S 76.4186°W

Colpas Qullpas
- District
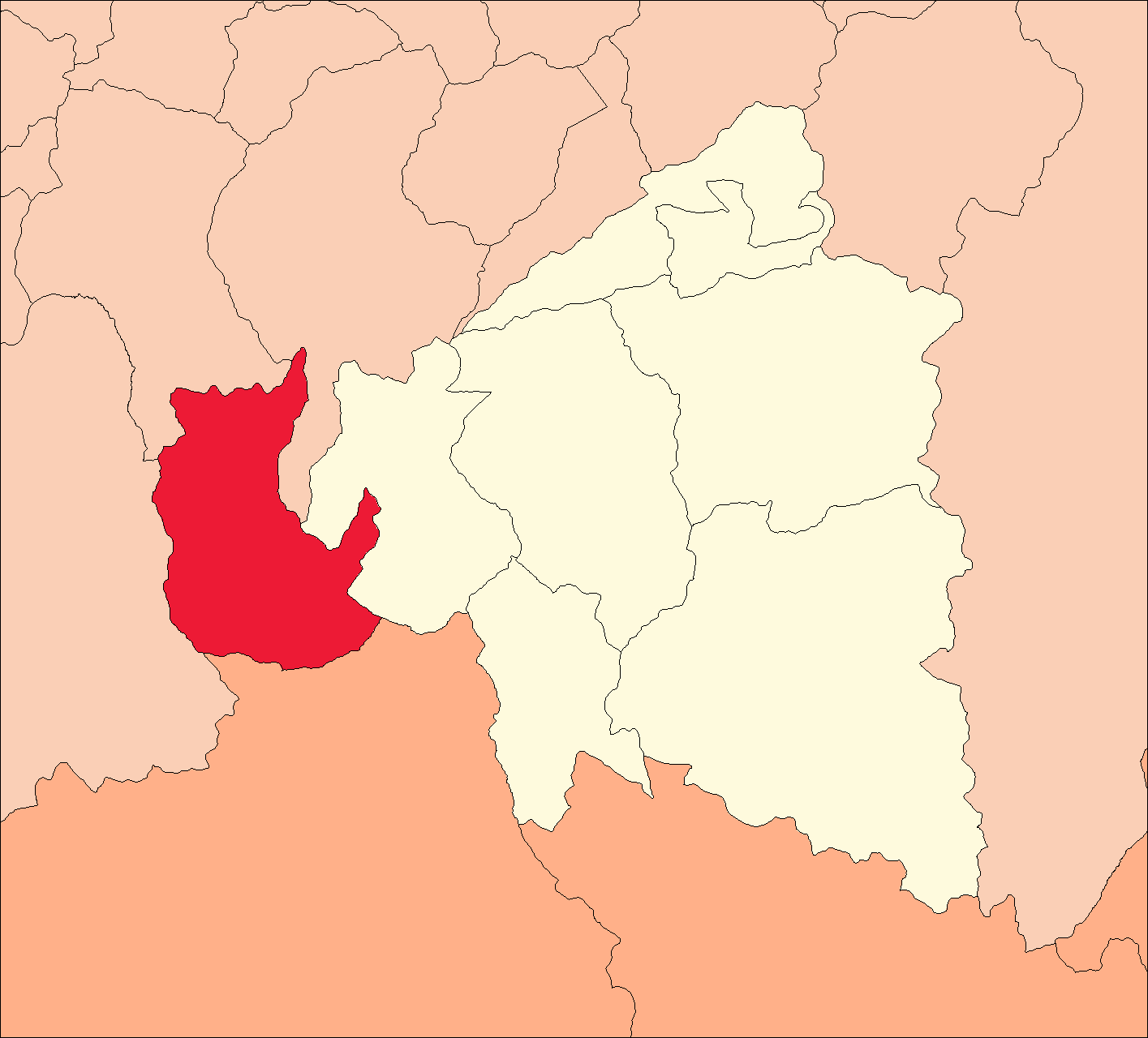
- Colpas district on the map of Ambo province in Peru
- Interactive map of Colpas
- Country: Peru
- Region: Huánuco
- Province: Ambo
- Founded: November 24, 1955
- Capital: Colpas

Government
  - Mayor: Sergio Pascual Melgarejo

Area
  - Total: 183.21 km^{2} (70.74 sq mi)
- Elevation: 2,700 m (8,900 ft)

Population (2005 census)
  - Total: 2,872
  - Density: 15.68/km^{2} (40.60/sq mi)
- Time zone: UTC-5 (PET)
- UBIGEO: 100203

Colpas District is one of eight districts of the province Ambo in Peru.

== Ethnic groups ==
The people in the district are mainly indigenous citizens of Quechua descent. Quechua is the language which the majority of the population (79.39%) learnt to speak in childhood, 20.41% of the residents started speaking using the Spanish language (2007 Peru Census).
