= Tomay Kichwa District =

Coordinates: 10.0805°S 76.2224°W

Tomayquichua
- District
- Interactive map of Tomayquichua
- Country: Peru
- Region: Huánuco
- Province: Ambo
- Founded: December 18, 1935
- Capital: Tomay Kichwa

Government
  - Mayor: David Antonio Herrera Yumpe

Area
  - Total: 42.11 km^{2} (16.26 sq mi)
- Elevation: 2,180 m (7,150 ft)

Population (2005 census)
  - Total: 3,511
  - Density: 83.38/km^{2} (215.9/sq mi)
- Time zone: UTC-5 (PET)
- UBIGEO: 100208

Tomayquichua District is one of eight districts in the Ambo of Peru. Despite its size and population, it receives some tourism, almost entirely domestic, due to locally popular events such as “El Baile de Negritos”, and the house of “La Perricholi”.

== See also ==
- Awkimarka
