= Yanaqucha =

Yanaqucha (Quechua for "black lake", also spelled Yana Cocha, Yana Ccocha, Yana Jocha, Yana Khocha, Yana Kocha, Yanaccocha, Yanacocha, Yanagocha, Yanajocha) may refer to:

== Lakes in Peru ==
- Yanaqucha (Ambo), Ambo Province, Huánuco Region
- Yanacocha (Asunción), Asunción Province, Ancash Region
- Yanaqucha (Bolognesi), Bolognesi Province, Ancash Region
- Yanaqucha (Cangallo), Cangallo Province, Ayacucho Region
- Yanaqucha (Huamanguilla), Huanta Province, Ayacucho Region
- Yanaqucha (Huamalíes), Huamalíes Province, Huánuco Region
- Yanaqucha (Huari), Huari Province, Ancash Region
- Yanaqucha (Huayllay), Pasco Province, Pasco Region
- Yanaqucha (Huanta), Huanta Province, Ayacucho Region
- Yanaqucha (Junín), Junin Province, Junín Region
- Yanaqucha (Tinyahuarco), Pasco Province, Pasco Region
- Yanacocha (Urubamba), Urubamba Province, Cusco Region
- Lake Yanacocha or Mamaqucha, Cajamarca Region, Peru

== Mountains in Peru ==
- Yanaqucha (Anta), Anta Province, Cusco Region
- Yanacocha (Canchis), Canchis Province, Cusco Region
- Yanaqucha (Carabaya), Carabaya Province, Puno Region
- Yanacocha (Carabaya-Melgar), on the border of Carabaya and Melgar Provinces, Puno Region
- Yanacocha (Huachón), Pasco Province, Pasco Region
- Yanaqucha (Melgar), Melgar Province, Puno Region
- Yanaqucha (Quispicanchi), Quispicanchi Province, Cusco Region
- Yanaqucha (San Marcos), Huari Province, Ancash Region

== Other uses ==
- Yanacocha, a mine in Peru
