= Cahuac District =

Coordinates: 9.8537°S 76.6310°W

Cahuac
- District
- Interactive map of Cahuac
- Country: Peru
- Region: Huánuco
- Province: Yarowilca
- Founded: January 3, 1952
- Capital: Cahuac

Government
  - Mayor: Vicente Huberto Lopez Tucto

Area
  - Total: 29.5 km^{2} (11.4 sq mi)
- Elevation: 3,371 m (11,060 ft)

Population (2005 census)
  - Total: 1,915
  - Density: 64.9/km^{2} (168/sq mi)
- Time zone: UTC-5 (PET)
- UBIGEO: 101102

Cahuac District is one of eight districts of the Yarowilca Province in Huánuco, Peru.
