= Putaqa (Huánuco) =

Mountain in Peru

- Location within Peru

Highest point
- Elevation: 4,600 m (15,100 ft)
- Coordinates: 10°27′47″S 75°58′52″W

Geography
- Location: Peru, Huánuco Region
- Parent range: Andes

Putaqa (Quechua for Rumex peruanus, also spelled Potaga) is a mountain north of the Waqurunchu mountain range in the Andes of Peru, about 4,600 m (15,100 ft) high. It is located in the Huánuco Region, Pachitea Province, Panao District. Putaqa lies northwest of a mountain named Ñawsaqucha and northeast of Waqurunchu.
