= Molino District =

Coordinates: 9.9113°S 76.0160°W

Molino
- District
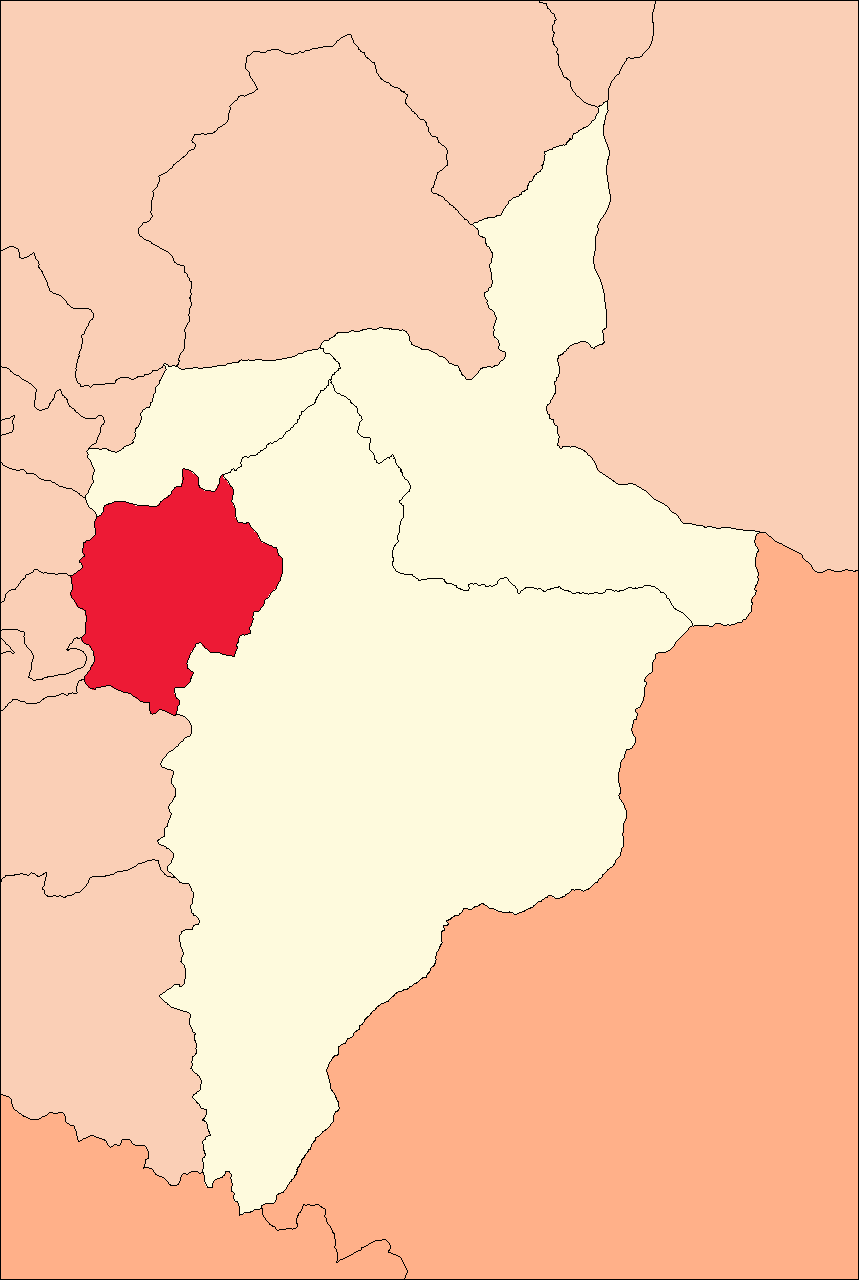
- Molino district
- Interactive map of Molino
- Country: Peru
- Region: Huánuco
- Province: Pachitea
- Founded: November 29, 1918
- Capital: Molino

Government
  - Mayor: Raul Rivera Encarnacion

Area
  - Total: 235.5 km^{2} (90.9 sq mi)
- Elevation: 2,400 m (7,900 ft)

Population (2005 census)
  - Total: 12,426
  - Density: 52.76/km^{2} (136.7/sq mi)
- Time zone: UTC-5 (PET)
- UBIGEO: 100803

Molino District is one of four districts of the province Pachitea in Peru.

== Ethnic groups ==
The people in the district are mainly indigenous citizens of Quechua descent. Quechua is the language which the majority of the population (80.83%) learnt to speak in childhood, 18.72% of the residents started speaking using the Spanish language (2007 Peru Census).
