= Kimsa Ukru Punta =

Mountain in Peru

- Location within Peru

Highest point
- Elevation: 4,400 m (14,400 ft)
- Coordinates: 9°41′57″S 76°30′03″W

Geography
- Location: Huánuco Region
- Parent range: Andes

Kimsa Ukru Punta (Quechua kimsa three, ukru hole, pit, hollow, punta peak; ridge, "three hollows peak", also spelled Quinsaucro Punta) is a mountain in the Andes of Peru which reaches a height of approximately 4,400 m (14,400 ft). It is located in the Huánuco Region, Yarowilca Province, Aparicio Pomares District.
