= Chaglla District =

Coordinates: 9.8408°S 75.8978°W

Chaglla Chaqlla
- District
- Interactive map of Chaglla; Chaqlla
- Country: Peru
- Region: Huánuco
- Province: Pachitea
- Founded: November 29, 1918
- Capital: Chaglla

Government
  - Mayor: Freddy Durand Condezo

Area
  - Total: 664.52 km^{2} (256.57 sq mi)
- Elevation: 3,000 m (9,800 ft)

Population (2005 census)
  - Total: 8,854
  - Density: 13.32/km^{2} (34.51/sq mi)
- Time zone: UTC-5 (PET)
- UBIGEO: 100802

Chaglla District is one of four districts of the province Pachitea in Peru.

== Populated centers ==
In the district there are 22 towns, one of which is urban and the 21 remaining rural.

=== Urban towns ===
- Chaglla (2604 pop.)

=== Rural towns ===
- Chunatahua (332 pop.)
- San Miguel (155 pop.)
- Chinchavito (460. hab)
- Puerto Guadalupe (266 pop.)
- Santa Rita Baja (364 pop.)
- Santa Rita Alta (274 pop.)
- Santa Rita Sur (222 pop.)
- Pampamarca (240 pop.)
- Miraflores (243 pop.)
- Andahuaylas (178 pop.)
- Pasto (186 pop.)
- Palmamonte (166 pop.)
- Chinchopampa (198 pop.)
- Chihuanhuay (161 pop.)
- Agua Blanca (175 pop.)
- Illatingo (210 pop.)
- San Cristóbal de Naunán (156 pop.)
- Quishuar (161 pop.)
- Yanano (252 pop.)
- Montevideo (319 pop.)
- Pueblo Libre (198 pop.)

=== Disperse population ===
People living in communities with fewer than 151 people joined 3542.

== Climate ==
Climate data for Chaglla, elevation 3,032 m (9,948 ft), (1991–2020)
Month	Jan	Feb	Mar	Apr	May	Jun	Jul	Aug	Sep	Oct	Nov	Dec	Year
Mean daily maximum °C (°F)	17.7 (63.9)	17.6 (63.7)	17.8 (64.0)	17.9 (64.2)	18.4 (65.1)	18.4 (65.1)	18.5 (65.3)	18.5 (65.3)	18.2 (64.8)	17.9 (64.2)	18.0 (64.4)	17.6 (63.7)	18.0 (64.5)
Mean daily minimum °C (°F)	8.2 (46.8)	8.3 (46.9)	8.4 (47.1)	8.4 (47.1)	8.0 (46.4)	7.6 (45.7)	7.0 (44.6)	7.1 (44.8)	7.6 (45.7)	8.0 (46.4)	8.1 (46.6)	8.1 (46.6)	7.9 (46.2)
Average precipitation mm (inches)	135.2 (5.32)	134.0 (5.28)	141.0 (5.55)	72.2 (2.84)	41.9 (1.65)	23.6 (0.93)	32.2 (1.27)	32.5 (1.28)	56.7 (2.23)	108.9 (4.29)	101.2 (3.98)	132.5 (5.22)	1,011.9 (39.84)
Source: National Meteorology and Hydrology Service of Peru
