= Chacabamba District =

Coordinates: 9.9024°S 76.6117°W

Chacabamba Chakapampa
- District
- Interactive map of Chacabamba
- Country: Peru
- Region: Huánuco
- Province: Yarowilca
- Founded: September 6, 1920
- Capital: Chacabamba

Government
  - Mayor: Carter Solorzano Mato

Area
  - Total: 16.53 km^{2} (6.38 sq mi)
- Elevation: 3,200 m (10,500 ft)

Population (2005 census)
  - Total: 1,837
  - Density: 111.1/km^{2} (287.8/sq mi)
- Time zone: UTC-5 (PET)
- UBIGEO: 101103

View from the Choras - Huánuco road part of the district of Chacabamba and the homonymous town.

Chacabamba District is one of eight districts of the province Yarowilca in Peru.

== Ethnic groups ==
The people in the district are mainly indigenous citizens of Quechua descent. Quechua is the language which the majority of the population (65.39%) learnt to speak in childhood, 34.40% of the residents started speaking using the Spanish language (2007 Peru Census).
