= Huácar District =

Coordinates: 10.2080°S 76.3321°W

Huácar
- District
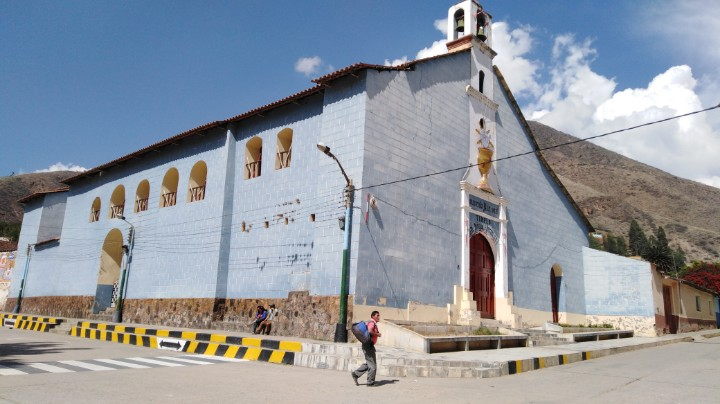
- Interactive map of Huácar
- Country: Peru
- Region: Huánuco
- Province: Ambo
- Capital: Huácar

Government
  - Mayor: Cleber Mory Rojas

Area
  - Total: 234.23 km^{2} (90.44 sq mi)
- Elevation: 2,114 m (6,936 ft)

Population (2005 census)
  - Total: 8,464
  - Density: 36.14/km^{2} (93.59/sq mi)
- Time zone: UTC-5 (PET)
- UBIGEO: 100205

Huácar District is one of eight districts of the province of Ambo in Peru.
