= K'uchu Hanka =

Mountain in Peru

- Location within Peru

Highest point
- Elevation: 4,925 m (16,158 ft)
- Coordinates: 10°25′38″S 76°01′45″W

Geography
- Location: Peru, Huánuco Region
- Parent range: Andes

K'uchu Hanka (Quechua k'uchu corner, local Quechua hanka snowcapped ridge or peak; ice, "corner peaks", Hispanicized spelling Jochojanca) is a 4,925-metre-high (16,158 ft) mountain in the Andes of Peru. It is located in the Huánuco Region, Ambo Province, San Rafael District, and in the Pachitea Province, Panao District. K'uchu Hanka lies north of Wamanripayuq, northwest of the Waqurunchu mountain range.
