= Atuq Wachanan =

Mountain in Peru

- Location within Peru

Highest point
- Elevation: 4,438 m (14,560 ft)
- Coordinates: 9°43′52″S 76°34′12″W

Geography
- Location: Huánuco Region
- Parent range: Andes

Atuq Wachanan (Quechua atuq fox, wacha birth, to give birth, -na, -n suffixes, "where the fox is born", also spelled Atoc-Huachanan) is a 4,438-metre-high (14,560 ft) mountain in the Andes of Peru. It is located in the Huánuco Region, Yarowilca Province, Aparicio Pomares District.
