= Pachitea province =

Coordinates: 9.8995°S 75.9565°W

Pachitea
- Province
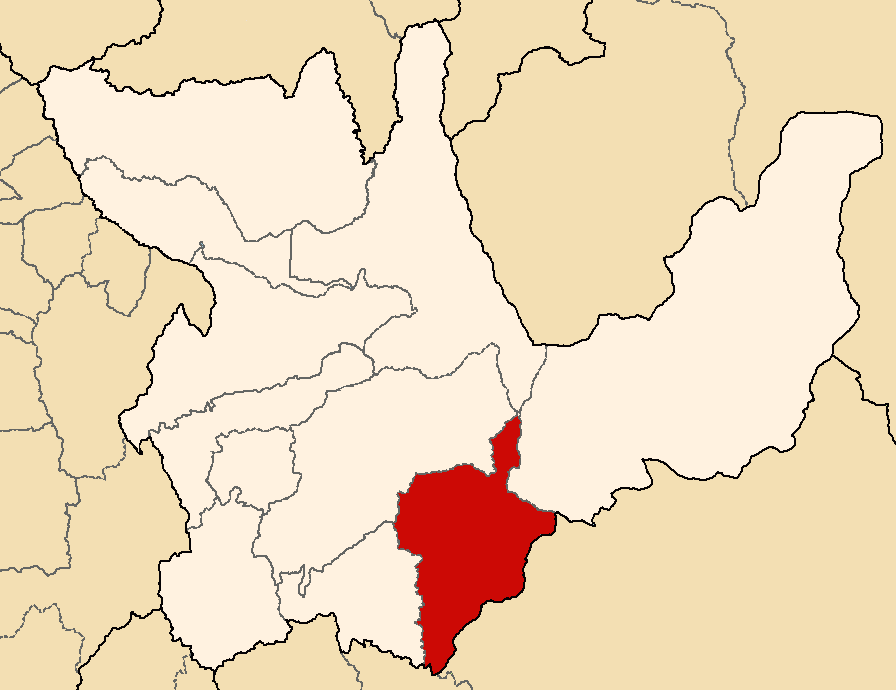
- Location of Pachitea in the Huánuco Region
- Country: Peru
- Region: Huánuco
- Capital: Panao

Government
  - Mayor: Cayo Rojas Rivera

Area
  - Total: 2,629.96 km^{2} (1,015.43 sq mi)

Population (2005 census)
  - Total: 51,861
  - Density: 19.719/km^{2} (51.073/sq mi)
- UBIGEO: 1008

Pachitea is one of eleven provinces of the Huánuco Region in Peru. The capital of this province is Panao.

== Boundaries ==
- North: province of Huánuco
- East: province of Puerto Inca
- South: Pasco Region
- West: province of Ambo

== Geography ==
Some of the highest mountains of the province are listed below:

- Awkin Qutu
- Ch'aki Qucha
- Hatun Kasha
- Iskuq
- Khuchi Mach'ay
- K'uchu Hanka
- Marayniyuq
- Mata Punta
- Misa Pata
- Puka Punta
- Puka Qaqa
- Putaqa
- Qantu
- Qayqu
- Qhata Wank'a
- Q'illay Punta
- Q'iru Silla
- Rikacha Tuna
- Rumi Chaka
- Saqra Mach'ay
- Suyru Qucha
- Tinya Qucha
- Walmisa Punta
- Walmish
- Wamanripayuq
- Warmi Pukyu
- Waqurunchu

== Political division ==
The province is divided into four districts, which are:

- Chaglla (Chaglla)
- Molino (Molino)
- Panao (Panao)
- Umari (Umari)

== Ethnic groups ==
The province is inhabited by indigenous citizens of Quechua descent. Spanish, however, is the language which the majority of the population (52.69%) learnt to speak in childhood, 46.98% of the residents started speaking using the Quechua language (2007 Peru Census).

== See also ==
- Usnu
