= San Rafael District, Ambo =

Coordinates: 10.3233°S 76.0835°W

San Rafael District
- District
- Interactive map of San Rafael District
- Country: Peru
- Region: Huánuco
- Province: Ambo
- Founded: October 21, 1912
- Capital: San Rafael

Government
  - Mayor: Macario Teodoro Janampa Valle

Area
  - Total: 443.63 km^{2} (171.29 sq mi)
- Elevation: 2,694 m (8,839 ft)

Population (2005 census)
  - Total: 11,015
  - Density: 24.829/km^{2} (64.307/sq mi)
- Time zone: UTC-5 (PET)
- UBIGEO: 100207

San Rafael District is one of eight districts of the province Ambo in Peru.

== Climate ==
Climate data for San Rafael, elevation 2,699 m (8,855 ft), (1991–2020)
Month	Jan	Feb	Mar	Apr	May	Jun	Jul	Aug	Sep	Oct	Nov	Dec	Year
Mean daily maximum °C (°F)	21.7 (71.1)	21.4 (70.5)	21.2 (70.2)	21.9 (71.4)	22.7 (72.9)	22.6 (72.7)	22.6 (72.7)	23.2 (73.8)	23.4 (74.1)	23.4 (74.1)	23.6 (74.5)	22.1 (71.8)	22.5 (72.5)
Mean daily minimum °C (°F)	10.8 (51.4)	11.1 (52.0)	10.8 (51.4)	9.8 (49.6)	9.1 (48.4)	7.4 (45.3)	7.0 (44.6)	7.8 (46.0)	9.2 (48.6)	9.9 (49.8)	10.3 (50.5)	10.8 (51.4)	9.5 (49.1)
Average precipitation mm (inches)	94.9 (3.74)	107.0 (4.21)	106.0 (4.17)	49.0 (1.93)	18.8 (0.74)	7.7 (0.30)	7.4 (0.29)	9.0 (0.35)	27.6 (1.09)	54.7 (2.15)	61.3 (2.41)	107.6 (4.24)	651 (25.62)
Source: National Meteorology and Hydrology Service of Peru

== See also ==
- K'uchu Hanka
- P'aqla Tanka
- Wamanripayuq
