= Conchamarca District =

Coordinates: 10.0491°S 76.2315°W

Conchamarca Qunchamarka
- District
- Interactive map of Conchamarca
- Country: Peru
- Region: Huánuco
- Province: Ambo
- Founded: September 5, 1940
- Capital: Conchamarca

Government
  - Mayor: Ruben Rodriguez Rivera

Area
  - Total: 101.76 km^{2} (39.29 sq mi)
- Elevation: 2,226 m (7,303 ft)

Population (2005 census)
  - Total: 5,139
  - Density: 50.50/km^{2} (130.8/sq mi)
- Time zone: UTC-5 (PET)
- UBIGEO: 100204

Conchamarca District is one of eight districts of the province Ambo in Peru.

== See also ==
- Pichqaqucha
