= Hatun Uqhu Punta =

Mountain in Peru

- Location within Peru

Highest point
- Elevation: 4,200 m (13,800 ft)
- Coordinates: 9°47′56″S 76°32′40″W

Geography
- Location: Huánuco Region
- Parent range: Andes

Hatun Uqhu Punta (Quechua hatun big, uqhu swamp, punta peak; ridge, "big swamp peak", also spelled Jatunogo Punta) is a mountain in the Andes of Peru which reaches a height of approximately 4,200 m (13,800 ft). It is located in the Huánuco Region, Yarowilca Province, Chavinillo District.
