= Chavinillo District =

Coordinates: 9.8593°S 76.6089°W

Chavinillo Chavinillo (Spanish) Chawinillu (Aymara) Chawinillu (Quechua)
- District
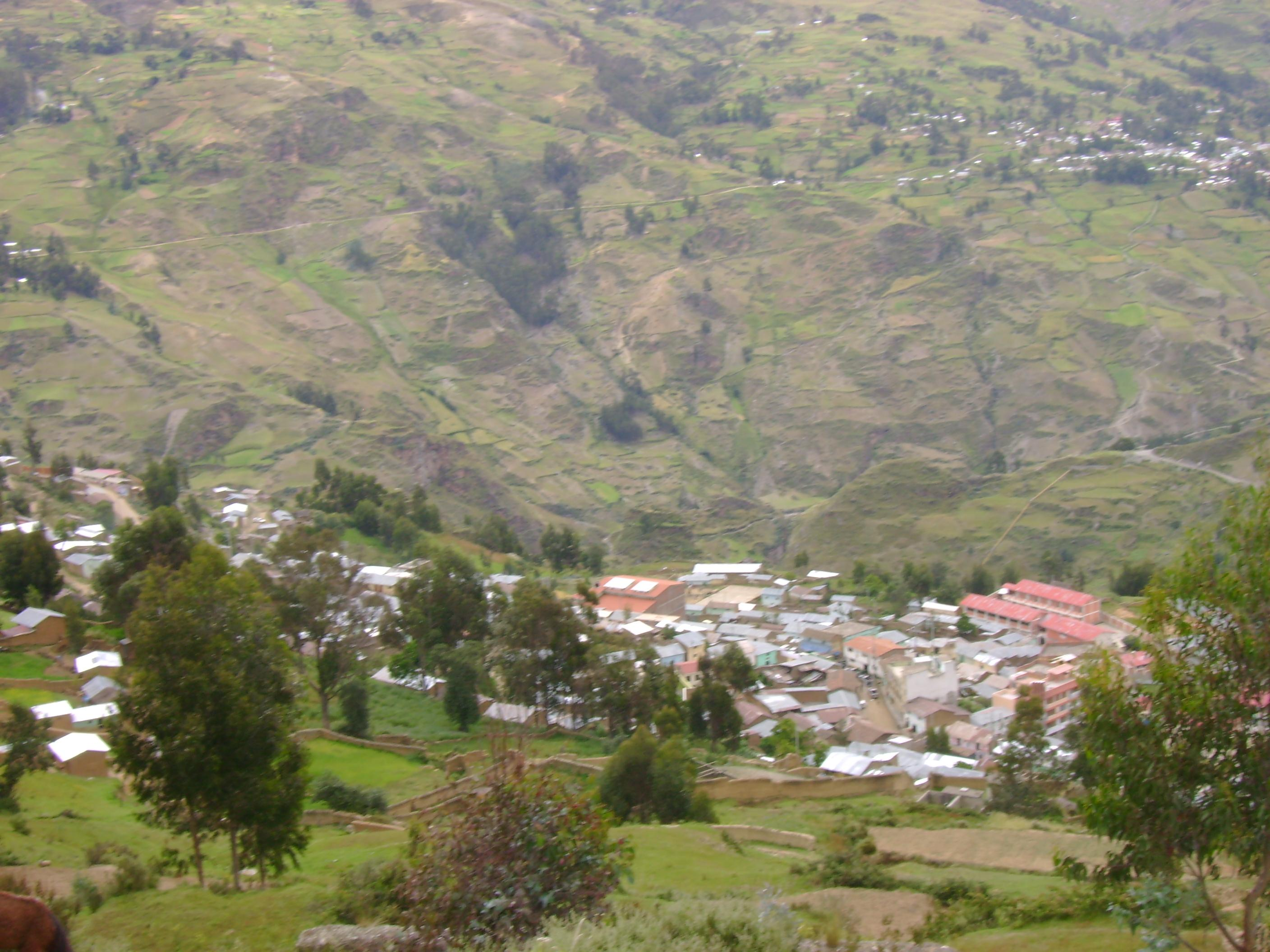
- Chavinillo
- Interactive map of Chavinillo
- Country: Peru
- Region: Huánuco
- Province: Yarowilca
- Founded: September 14, 1906
- Capital: Chavinillo

Government
  - Mayor: Rubino Aguirre Solorzano

Area
  - Total: 205.16 km^{2} (79.21 sq mi)
- Elevation: 3,471 m (11,388 ft)

Population (2005 census)
  - Total: 10,259
  - Density: 50.005/km^{2} (129.51/sq mi)
- Time zone: UTC-5 (PET)
- UBIGEO: 101101

Chavinillo District is one of eight districts of the Yarowilca Province in Huánuco, Peru.

== Ethnic groups ==
The people in the district are mainly indigenous citizens of Quechua descent. Quechua is the language which the majority of the population (60.07%) learnt to speak in childhood, 39.57% of the residents started speaking using the Spanish language (2007 Peru Census).

== See also ==
- Hatun Uqhu Punta
- Laksha Warina
- Tuqtuqucha Punta
- T'akaq
- Waruq
