= Pichcacocha Lakes =

Lakes in Huanuco, Peru

- Location within Peru
- Location: Peru; Huánuco Region
- Coordinates: 10°01′10″S 76°07′42″W

Pichcacocha Lakes or Pichgacocha Lakes (possibly from Quechua pichqa five qucha lake) is a group of five lakes in Peru. They lie in the Huánuco Region, Ambo Province, Conchamarca District.
