= Pampamarca District =

Pampamarca District may refer to:

- Peru
  - Pampamarca District, Canas
  - Pampamarca District, La Unión
  - Pampamarca District, Yarowilca
