= Qullqa Punta =

Mountain in Peru

- Location within Peru

Highest point
- Elevation: 4,542 m (14,902 ft)
- Coordinates: 9°43′14″S 76°29′43″W

Geography
- Location: Huánuco Region
- Parent range: Andes

Qullqa Punta (Quechua qullqa, qulqa deposit, storehouse, punta peak; ridge; first, before, in front of, "deposit peak", also spelled Julca Punta) is a 4,542-metre-high (14,902 ft) mountain in the Andes of Peru. It is located in the Huánuco Region, Yarowilca Province, Aparicio Pomares District.
