= Obas District =

Coordinates: 9.7710°S 76.6635°W

Obas
- District
- Interactive map of Obas
- Country: Peru
- Region: Huánuco
- Province: Yarowilca
- Founded: January 2, 1857
- Capital: Obas

Government
  - Mayor: Bernardino Armengol Chagua Ciezza

Area
  - Total: 123.16 km^{2} (47.55 sq mi)
- Elevation: 3,526 m (11,568 ft)

Population (2005 census)
  - Total: 6,266
  - Density: 50.88/km^{2} (131.8/sq mi)
- Time zone: UTC-5 (PET)
- UBIGEO: 101106

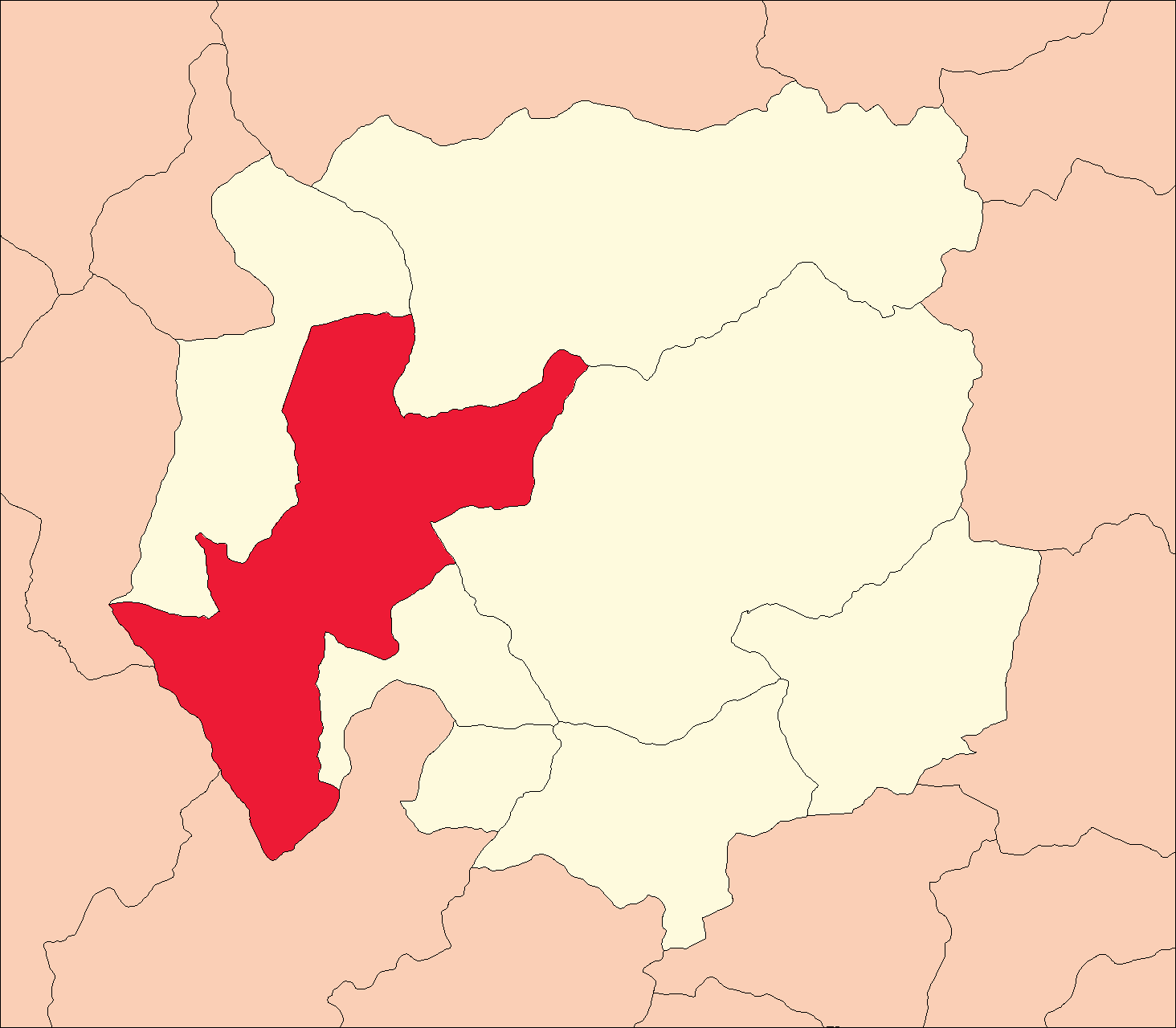
location of the obas district

Obas District is one of eight districts of the province Yarowilca in Peru.

== Ethnic groups ==
The people in the district are mainly indigenous citizens of Quechua descent. Quechua is the language which the majority of the population (59.11%) learnt to speak in childhood, 40.57% of the residents started speaking using the Spanish language (2007 Peru Census).

== See also ==
- Awkillu Waqra
- Wallpayunka
- Wich'un
