= Warahirka =

Archaeological site in Peru

Geography
- Location: Peru, Huánuco Region, Yarowilca Province

Warahirka or Wara Hirka (Quechua, wara trousers / bee, Ancash Quechua hirka mountain, Hispanicized spellings Huarajirca, Huara Jirca) is a mountain with an archaeological site of the same name in Peru. It is situated in the Huánuco Region, Yarowilca Province, Pampamarca District, about 1.5 km from Pampamarca, near La Florida and Warahirka (Huarajirca).
