= Usnu =

Usnu may refer to:

- Ushnu or usnu, in the Inca Empire an altar for cults to the deities, a throne for the emperor, an elevated place for judgment and a reviewing stand of military command.
- Usnu, Ayacucho, an archaeological site in the Ayacucho Region, Peru
- Usnu, Huánuco, an archaeological site in the Huánuco Region, Peru
