= Putaqa =

Putaqa (Quechua for Rumex peruanus, also spelled Potacca, Potaga, Putaca, Putacca, Putaja) may refer to:

- Putaqa (Ancash), a mountain in the Ancash Region, Peru
- Putaqa (Huánuco), a mountain in the Huánuco Region, Peru
- Putaqa (Junín), a mountain in the Junín Region, Peru
- Putaqa (Pasco), a mountain in the Pasco Region, Peru
