= Regional Government of Huánuco =

Regional government in Peru

- Gobierno Regional de Huánuco

Regional Government overview
- Formed: January 1, 2003; 22 years ago
- Jurisdiction: Department of Huánuco
- Website: Government site

The Regional Government of Huánuco (Spanish: Gobierno Regional de Huánuco; GORE Huánuco) is the regional government that represents the Department of Huánuco. It is the body with legal identity in public law and its own assets, which is in charge of the administration of provinces of the department in Peru. Its purpose is the social, cultural and economic development of its constituency. It is based in the city of Huánuco.

== List of representatives ==
Governor	Political party	Period
Luzmila Templo Condeso	Movimiento Independiente Regional luchemos Por Huanuco	January 1, 2003–December 31, 2006
Jorge Espinoza Egoávil	Frente Amplio Regional	January 1, 2007–December 31, 2010
Luis Picón	Somos Perú	January 1, 2011–December 31, 2014
Rubén Alva Ochoa	Movimiento Integración Descentralista	January 1, 2015–December 31, 2018
Juan Alvarado Cornelio	Acción Popular	January 1, 2019–March 30, 2022
Erasmo Fernández Sixto	Acción Popular	March 30, 2022–December 31, 2022
Antonio Pulgar Lucas	Movimiento Independiente Regional Mi Buen Vecino	January 1, 2023–Incumbent

== See also ==
- Regional Governments of Peru
- Department of Huánuco
