= Usnu, Huánuco =

Archaeological site in Peru

Usnu
- Location within Peru
- 9.8524°S 76.0301°W
- Location: Peru, Huánuco Region, Pachitea Province
- Region: Andes

Site notes
- Height: 2,833 metres (9,295 ft)

Usnu (Quechua for altar / a special platform for important celebrations, also spelled Ushnu) is an archaeological site in Peru. It is located in the Huánuco Region, Pachitea Province, Umari District, at a height of about 2,833 metres (9,295 ft).
