= Panao =

- Town
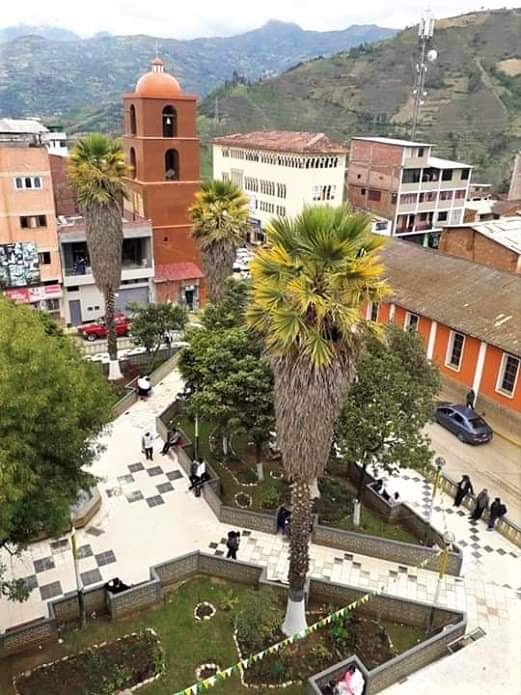
- Plaza Mayor

- Location within Peru
- Coordinates: 9°53′53″S 76°59′35″W
- Country: Peru
- Region: Huánuco
- Province: Pachitea
- District: Panao
- Time zone: UTC-5 (PET)

Panao is a town in central Peru, capital of Pachitea in Huánuco Region.
