= Awkimarka (Huánuco) =

Archaeological site in Peru

- Location within Peru
- 10.07731°S 76.21392°W
- Location: Peru
- Region: Huánuco Region, Ambo Province

Awkimarka (Quechua awki prince / a mythical figure of the Andean culture / grandfather, marka village, Hispanicized spelling Auquimarca) is an archaeological site in Peru. It is situated in the Huánuco Region, Ambo Province, Tomay Kichwa District.
