= Auquilohuagra =

Archaeological site in Peru

- Interactive map of Auquilohuagra
- 9°46′22″S 76°38′56″W
- Location: Peru; Huánuco Region, Yarowilca Province

Auquilohuagra (possibly from awkillu, local Quechua word for deity, waqra horn) is an archaeological site in Peru. It is situated in the Huánuco Region, Yarowilca Province, Obas District. The site was declared part of the National Cultural Heritage of Peru in 2006.

== See also ==
- Hualpayunca
- Huichun
