= Saqra Mach'ay (Huánuco-Pasco) =

Mountain in Peru

- Location within Peru

Highest point
- Elevation: 4,750 m (15,580 ft)
- Coordinates: 10°27′11″S 76°00′40″W

Geography
- Location: Peru, Huánuco Region, Pasco Region
- Parent range: Andes

Saqra Mach'ay (Quechua saqra malignant, pernicious, bad, bad tempered, wicked; restless; devil, synonym of supay, mach'ay cave, Hispanicized spelling Sagramachay) is a mountain in the Andes of Peru, about 4,750 m (15,580 ft) high, in the Pasco Region, Pasco Province, Ticlacayan District. It lies northwest of the Waqurunchu mountain range, southeast of Wamanripayuq.
