= Waqurunchu (Huánuco-Pasco) =

Mountain in Peru

- Location within Peru

Highest point
- Elevation: 4,800 m (15,700 ft)
- Coordinates: 10°28′46″S 75°59′09″W

Geography
- Location: Peru, Huánuco Region, Pasco Region
- Parent range: Andes

Waqurunchu (a possible spelling from Quechua, hispanicized spelling Huaguruncho) is a mountain north of the Waqurunchu mountain range in the Andes of Peru, about 4,800 m (15,700 ft) high. It is located in the Huánuco Region, Pachitea Province, Panao District, and in the Pasco Region, Pasco Province, Ticlacayan District.
