= Chavinillo =

Chavinillo Chavinillo (Spanish) Chawinillu (Aymara) Chawinillu (Quechua)
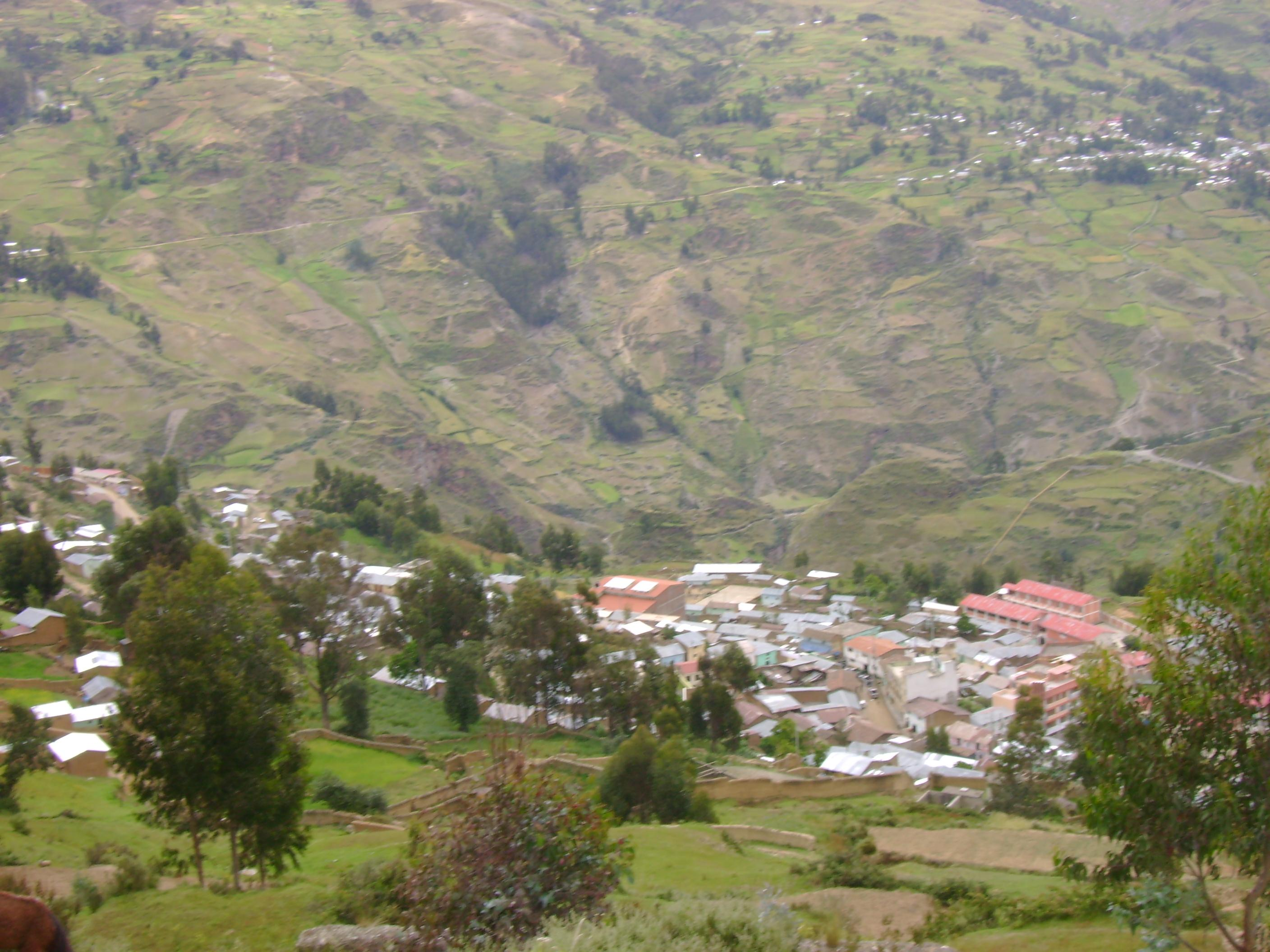

- Location within Peru
- Coordinates: 9°51′33″S 76°36′30″W
- Country: Peru
- Region: Huánuco
- Province: Yarowilca
- District: Chavinillo
- Time zone: UTC-5 (PET)

Chavinillo, or Chawinillu, is the capital of Yarowilca Province, located in the Huánuco Region of central Peru.
