= P'aqla Tanka =

Mountain in Peru

- Location within Peru

Highest point
- Elevation: 4,800 m (15,700 ft)
- Coordinates: 10°13′46″S 76°04′07″W

Geography
- Location: Peru, Huánuco Region
- Parent range: Andes

P'aqla Tanka (Quechua p'aqla bald, tanka a deep bifurcation, fork, also spelled Pagletanca) is a mountain in the Andes of Peru, about 4,800 m (15,700 ft) high. It is located in the Huánuco Region, Ambo Province, San Rafael District. P'aqla Tanka lies southwest of Ashu Hanka.
