= Waruq =

Archaeological site in Peru

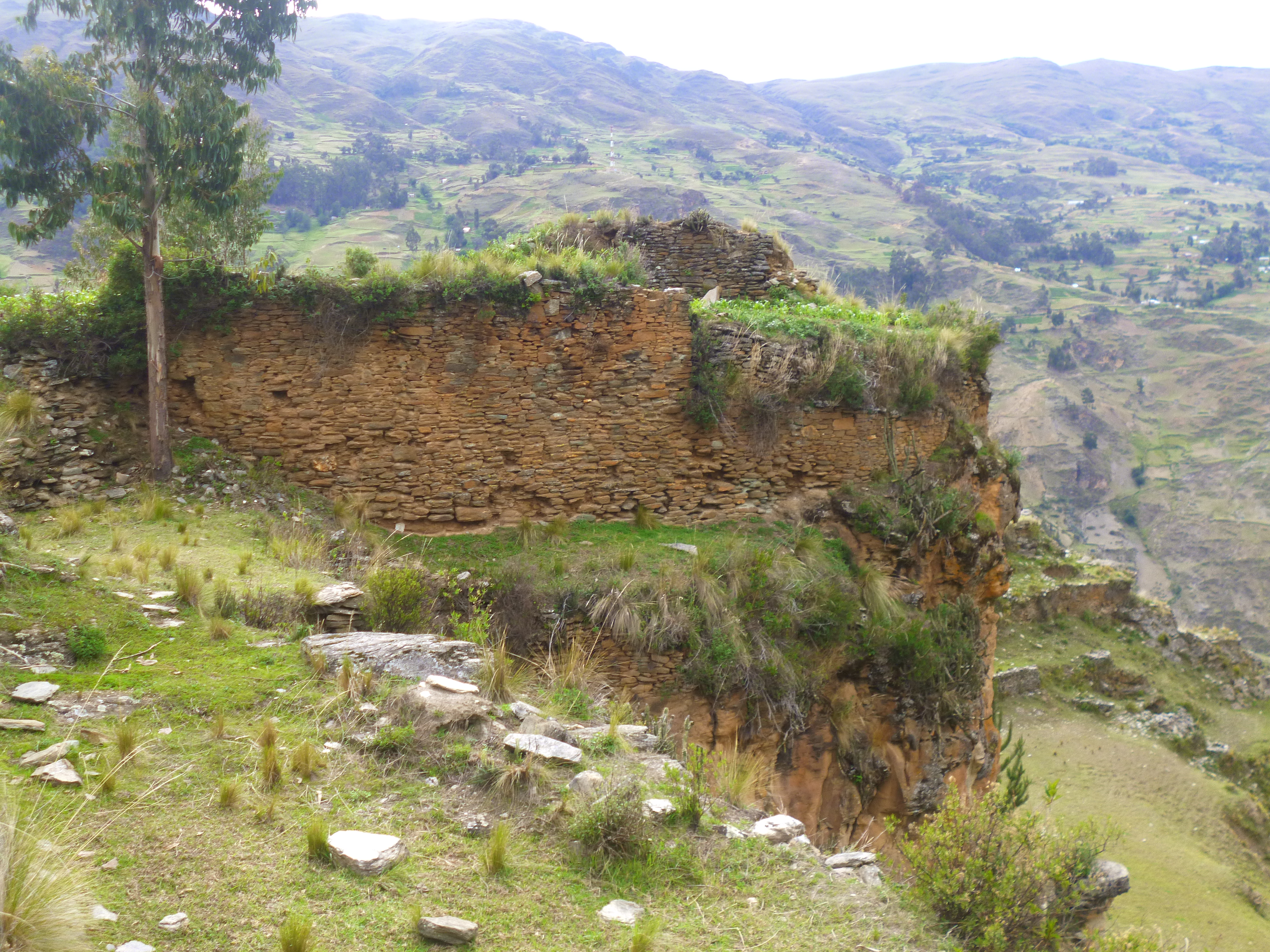
- Stone structures at Waruq
- Location: Peru
- Region: Huánuco Region, Yarowilca Province

Waruq (Quechua waru basket or platform of a rope bridge to cross rivers / stony ground or place, precious stones, heaping, stone heap, -q a suffix, Hispanicized spellings Huaroc, Huaroj) is an archaeological site in Peru. It is situated in the Huánuco Region, Yarowilca Province, Chavinillo District

== See also ==
- T'akaq
