= Yarowilca province =

Province of Huánuco, Peru

Coordinates: 9°46′59″S 76°35′00″W

Yarowilca Yarowilca (Spanish) Yaruwillka (Aymara) Yaruwillka (Quechua)
- Province
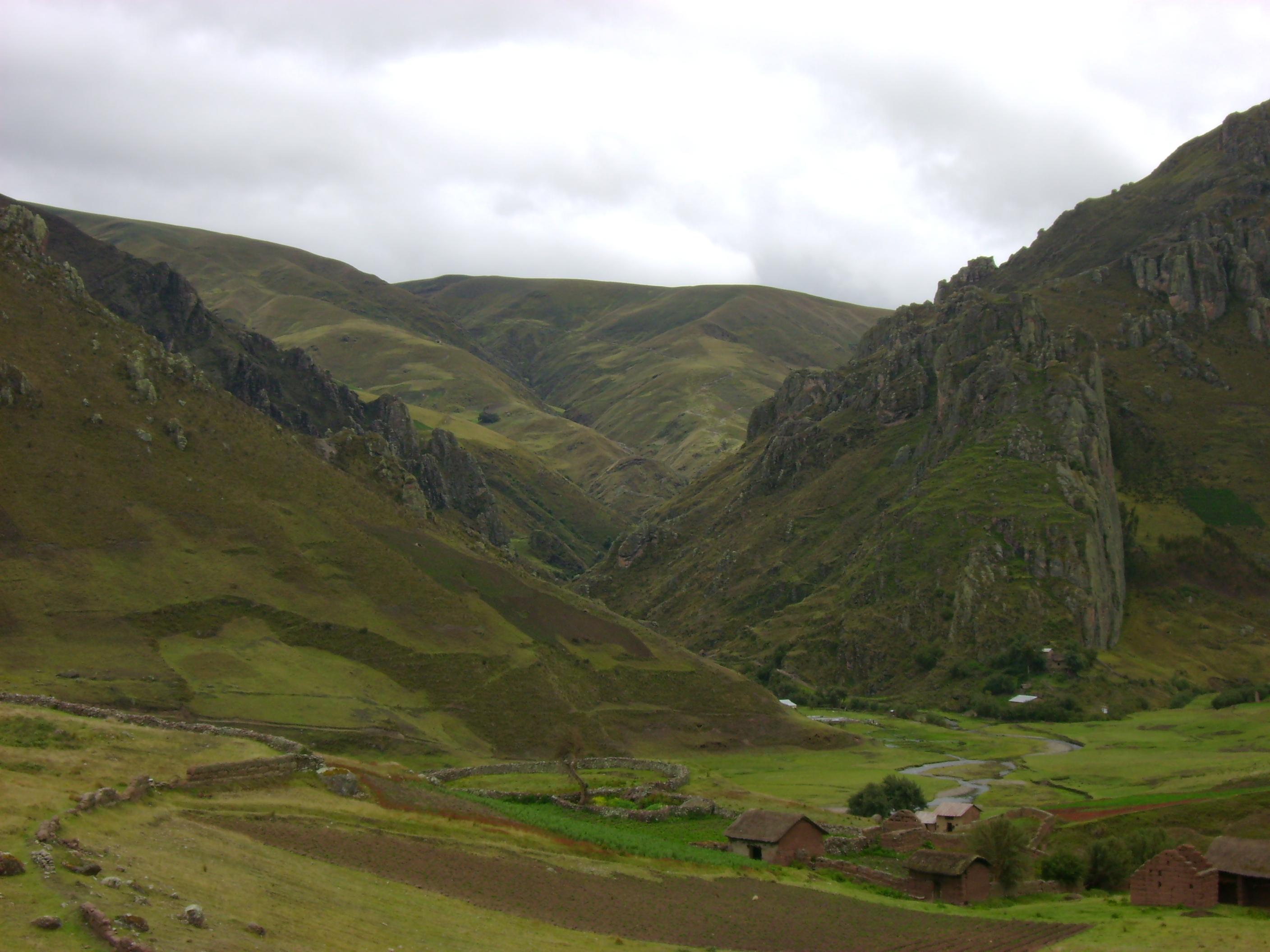
- Isi Pampa in the Jacas Chico District

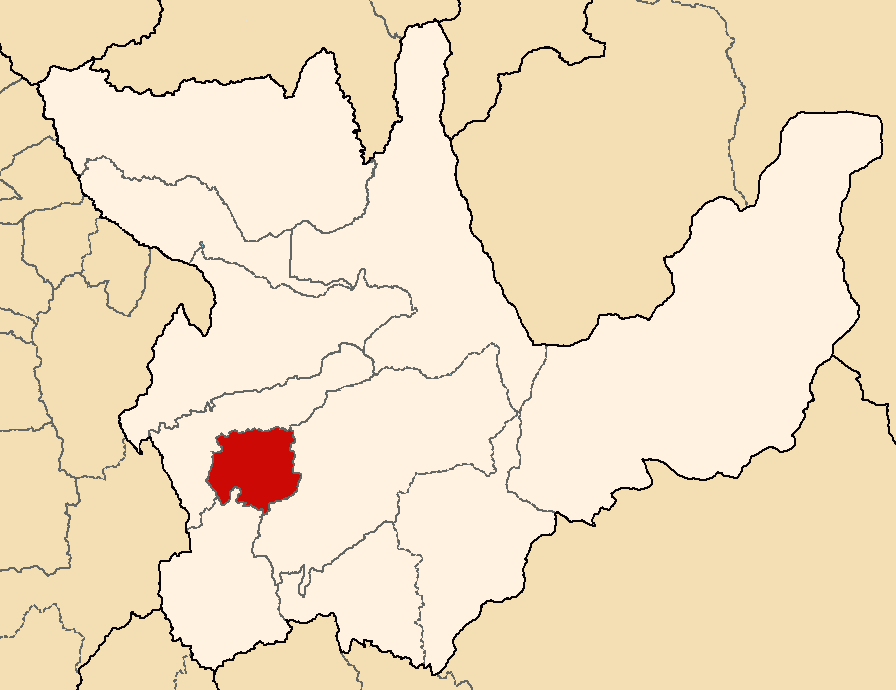
- Location of Yarowilca in the Huánuco Region
- Country: Peru
- Region: Huánuco
- Capital: Chavinillo

Government
  - Mayor: Rubino Aguirre Solorzano

Area
  - Total: 759.71 km^{2} (293.33 sq mi)

Population (2005 census)
  - Total: 38,813
  - Density: 51.089/km^{2} (132.32/sq mi)
- UBIGEO: 1011

Yarowilca is the smallest of eleven provinces of the Huánuco Region in Peru. Its capital is Chavinillo.

== Boundaries ==
Dos de Mayo province is north of Yarowilca, Huánuco province is east, Lauricocha province lies southward and Dos de Mayo province to the west.

== Geography ==
One of the highest peaks of the district is Qullqa Punta at 4,542 m (14,902 ft). Other mountains include:

- Atuq Wachanan
- Awkin Qaqa
- Hatun Uqhu Punta
- Huch'uy Yaku
- Ichik Yanama
- Inka Wayin
- Isu Pampa
- Kachi Pampa Punta
- Kimsa Ukru Punta
- Kunkush Punta
- Kuntur Mach'ay
- Laksha Warina
- Mata Punta
- Mata Qaqa Punta
- Mina Punta
- Para Qucha Punta
- Puka Qucha
- Puka Rumi Punta
- Puma Wayin
- P'itiq Punta
- Rumi Sunqu
- Ruphay Punta
- Siklla Raqra Punta
- Silla Kancha
- Tuqtuqucha Punta
- T'akaq
- Uqsha P'itiq
- Wank'ayuq
- Wari Punta
- Warmi Rumi
- Waylla Punta
- Wichhu Qullpa
- Wiñaq Punta
- Wiru Wiru
- Yana Qucha
- Yana Tutu
- Yanashallash

== Political division ==
The province is divided into eight districts:

- Aparicio Pomares (Chupan)
- Cahuac (Cahuac)
- Chacabamba (Chacabamba)
- Chavinillo (Chavinillo)
- Choras (Choras)
- Jacas Chico (San Cristóbal de Jacas Chico)
- Obas (Obas)
- Pampamarca (Pampamarca)

== Languages ==
The Yarowilcan Indigenous peoples of the Americas are mainly Quechua people. The Quechua language was taught to 60.97% of citizens in childhood, as of 2007, and 38.74% learned Spanish.

== Archaeology ==
Some of the most important archaeological sites of the province are Awkillu Waqra, T'akaq, Wallpayunka, Warahirka, Waruq and Wich'un.
