= Yanaqucha (Ambo) =

Lake in Peru

- Location within Peru
- Location: Peru; Huánuco Region, Ambo Province, Ambo District
- Coordinates: 10°6′25″S 76°4′4″W

Yanaqucha (Quechua yana black, very dark, qucha lake, "black lake", Hispanicized spelling Yanacocha, Yanagocha) is a lake in the Andes of Peru located in Ambo District, Ambo Province, Huánuco Region.

== Location ==
It is situated between the mountains Yanahirka ("black mountain", Hispanicized Yanahirca) in the southwest and Yanaqucha in the northeast.
