= T'akaq =

Archaeological site in Peru

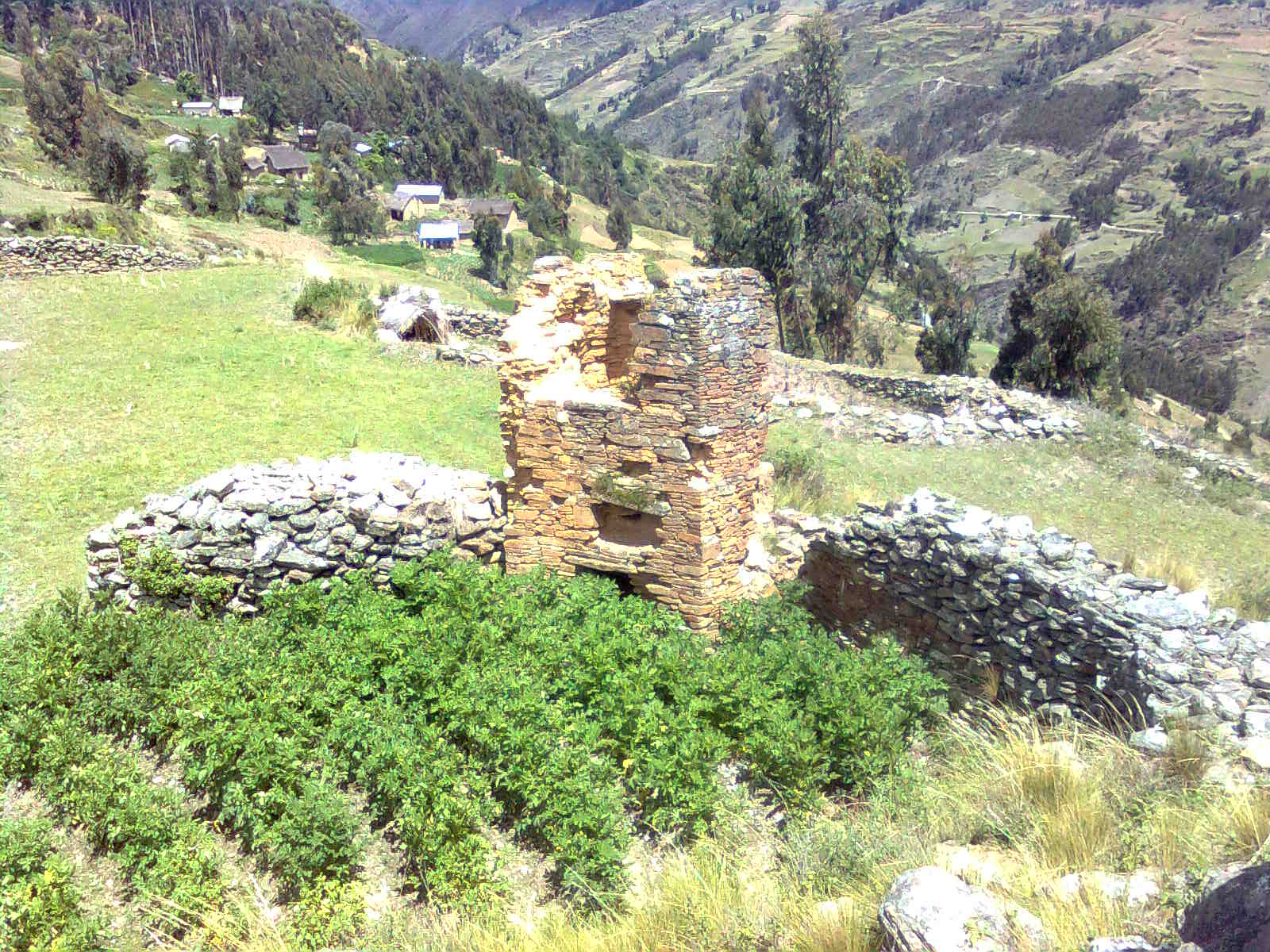
- Stone structures at the archaeological site of T'akaq on the mountain of the same name

Highest point
- Elevation: 4,000 m (13,000 ft)
- Coordinates: 9°49′40″S 76°36′55″W

Geography
- Location within Peru
- Location: Peru, Huánuco Region, Yarowilca Province

T'akaq (Quechua t'akay to scatter, to spread, -q a suffix, "scattered, spread / the one that scatters", Hispanicized spellings Tacacc, Tacaj), Takaq (Quechua takay to hit, "hit / the one that hits") or T'aqaq (Quechua t'aqay to separate, "separated / the one that separates") is a nearly 4,000-metre-high (13,123 ft) mountain with an archaeological site of the same name in Peru. It is situated in the Huánuco Region, Yarowilca Province, Chavinillo District, near Chavinillo.

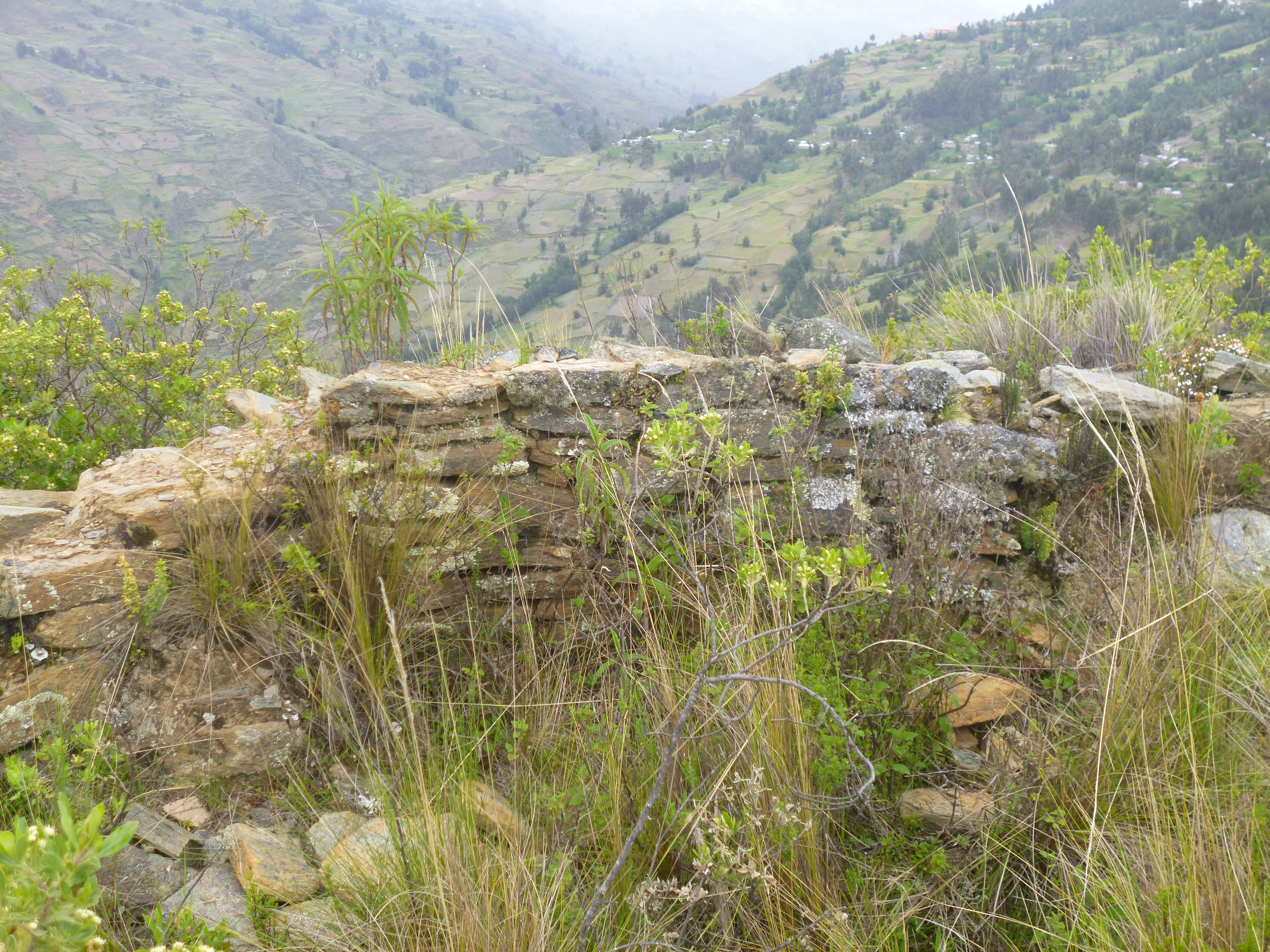
Huayuculano and Huacuto as seen from the archaeological site of T'akaq

== See also ==
- Waruq
