= Pampamarca District, Yarowilca =

Pampamarca Pampamarka
- District
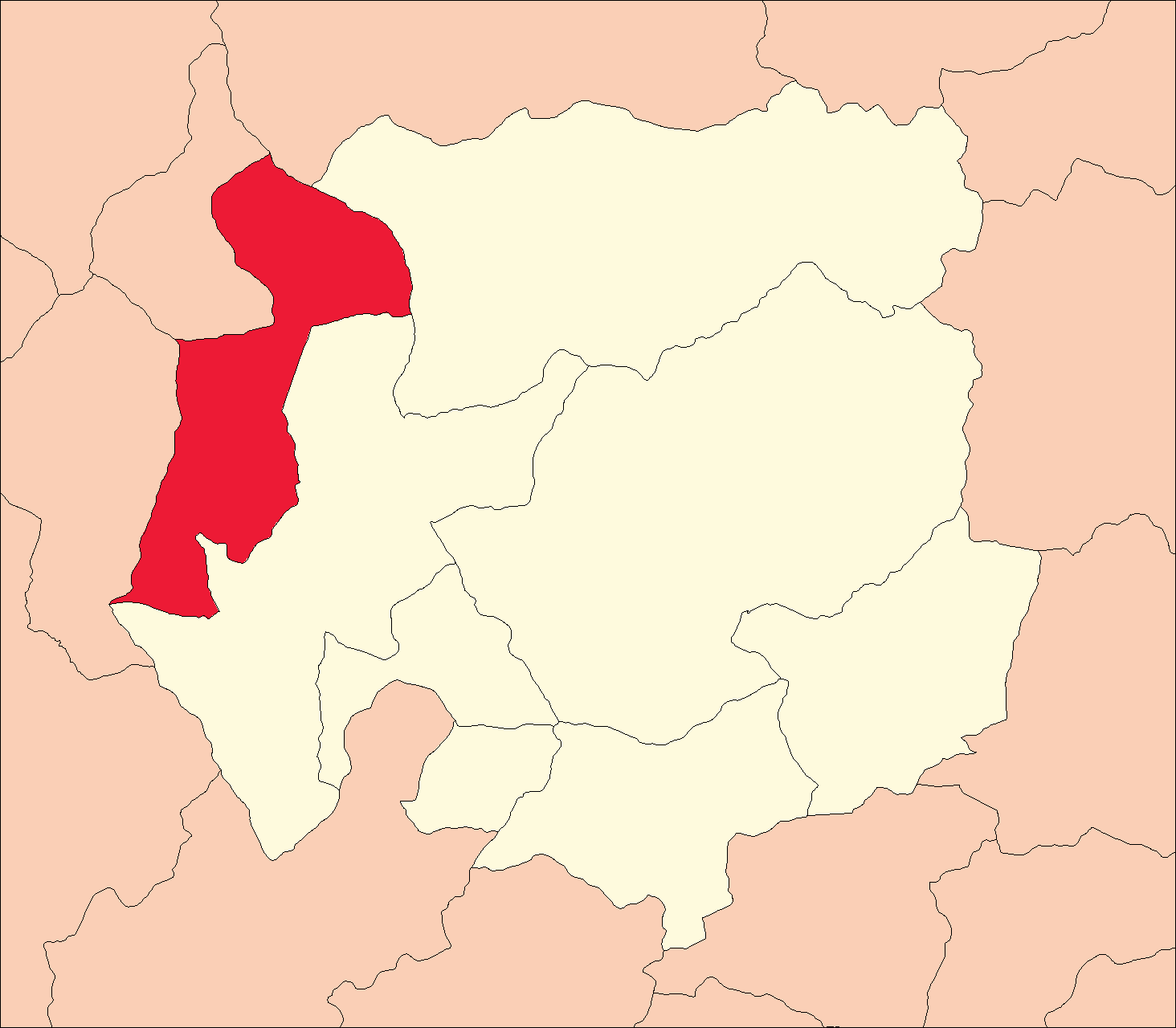
- Location of Pampamarca in the Yarowilca Province
- Coordinates: 14.1453°S 71.4594°W
- Country: Peru
- Region: Huánuco
- Province: Yarowilca
- Founded: December 16, 1989
- Capital: Pampamarca

Government
  - Mayor: Rosas Orlando Herrera Calixto

Area
  - Total: 72.68 km^{2} (28.06 sq mi)
- Elevation: 3,434 m (11,266 ft)

Population (2005 census)
  - Total: 2,980
  - Density: 41.0/km^{2} (106/sq mi)
- Time zone: UTC-5 (PET)
- UBIGEO: 101107

Pampamarca District is one of eight districts of the province Yarowilca in Peru.

== Ethnic groups ==
The people in the district are mainly indigenous citizens of Quechua descent. Quechua is the language which the majority of the population (74.03%) learnt to speak in childhood, 25.63% of the residents started speaking using the Spanish language (2007 Peru Census).

== See also ==
- Warahirka
