= Ambo, Peru =

Ambo
- Village
- Location within Peru Location within South America
- Country: Peru
- Region: Huánuco
- Province: Ambo
- District: Ambo

Government
  - Mayor: Concepcion Eusebio Palacios Briceño
- Elevation: 2,064 m (6,772 ft)

Population
  - Total: 6,865

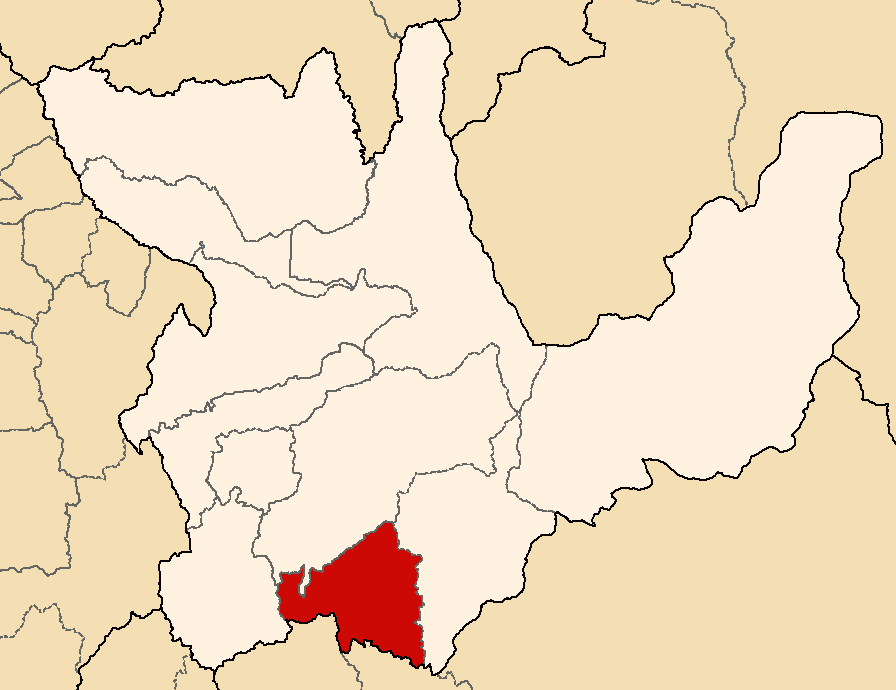
Location of the province Ambo in the Huánuco region in Peru.

Ambo (Quechua: Ampuq) is a town in central Peru. Ambo is the capital of the province Ambo in the region Huánuco.

It was the birthplace of Bishop Ricardo Durand Flórez, third Bishop of Callao.
