= Wamanripayuq (Huánuco) =

Mountain in Peru

- Location within Peru

Highest point
- Elevation: 4,960 m (16,270 ft)
- Coordinates: 10°26′33″S 76°01′53″W

Geography
- Location: Peru, Huánuco Region
- Parent range: Andes

Wamanripayuq (Quechua wamanripa Senecio, -yuq a suffix, "the one with the wamanripa", Hispanicized spelling Huamanripayoc) is a 4,960-metre-high (16,273 ft) mountain in the Andes of Peru. It is located in the Huánuco Region, Ambo Province, San Rafael District, and in the Pachitea Province, Panao District.
