= Ambo province =

Coordinates: 10°08′S 76°12′W

Ambo
- Province
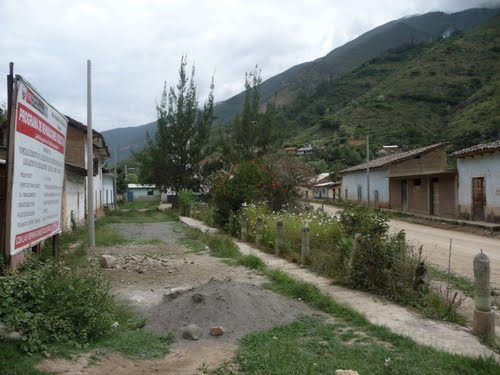
- The village of Quchachini

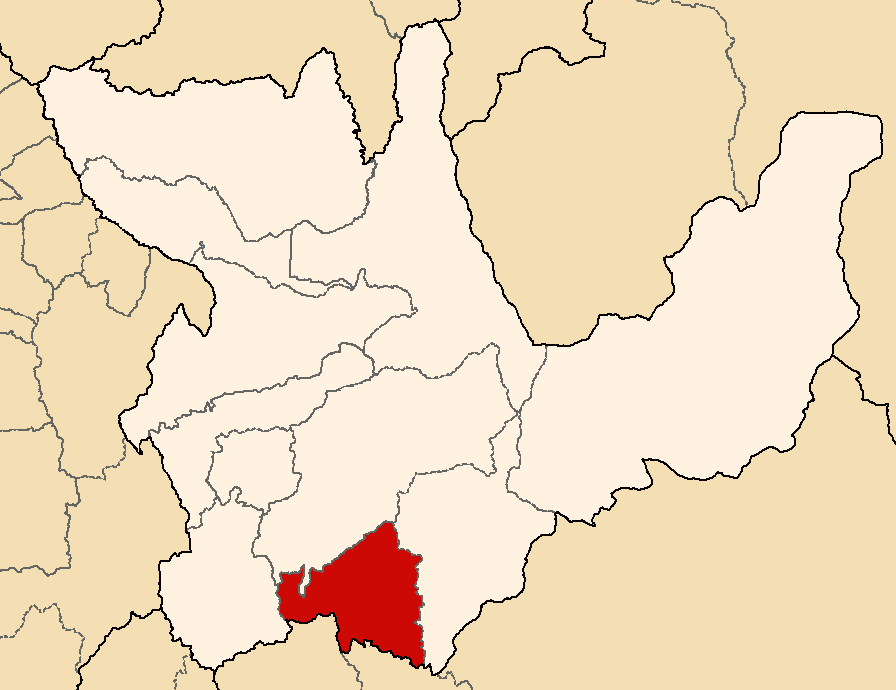
- Location of Ambo in the Huánuco Region
- Country: Peru
- Region: Huánuco
- Capital: Ambo

Government
  - Mayor: Concepcion Eusebio Palacios Briceño

Area
  - Total: 1,581.00 km^{2} (610.43 sq mi)

Population (2005 census)
  - Total: 54,588
  - Density: 34.528/km^{2} (89.426/sq mi)
- UBIGEO: 1002

Ambo is one of eleven provinces of the Huánuco Region in Peru. The capital of this province is the city of Ambo.

== Boundaries ==
- North: province of Huánuco
- East: province of Pachitea
- South: Pasco Region
- West: province of Lauricocha

== Geography ==
One of the highest peaks of the province is Wamanripayuq at 4,960 m (16,270 ft). Other mountains are listed below:

- Achhisqa
- Aklla Kancha
- Awkin Qutu
- Chawpi Punta
- Hatun Hirka
- Hucha Rumi
- Isqun
- Kichki
- Kushuru Punta
- Kushuruyuq
- K'uchu Hanka
- Ñawin
- Parya Pata
- Pata Wasi
- Pilli Wanqa
- Pishtaq
- Putaqa
- Putusi
- Phaqcha
- Phaqcha Putaqa
- P'aqla Tanka
- P'unqu
- Q'iru Mach'ay
- Rumi Chaka
- Taruka
- Walmisa Punta
- Wamanripayuq
- Warawlla
- Waychaw Marka
- Yana Hirka
- Yana Mit'u
- Yana Qucha

== Political division ==
The province is divided into eight districts, which are:

- Ambo (Ambo)
- Cayna (Cayna)
- Colpas (Colpas)
- Conchamarca (Conchamarca)
- Huácar (Huácar)
- San Francisco (Mosca)
- San Rafael (San Rafael)
- Tomay Kichwa (Tomay Kichwa)

== Ethnic groups ==
The province is inhabited by indigenous citizens of Quechua descent. Spanish, however, is the language which the majority of the population (74.53%) learnt to speak in childhood, 25.22% of the residents started speaking using the Quechua language (2007 Peru Census).

== See also ==
- Awkimarka
- Hatun Uchku
- Pichqaqucha
- Yanaqucha
