= Department of Huánuco =

Department of Peru

Coordinates: 8°21′47″S 76°18′56″W

Huánuco Wanuku (Quechua)
- Department
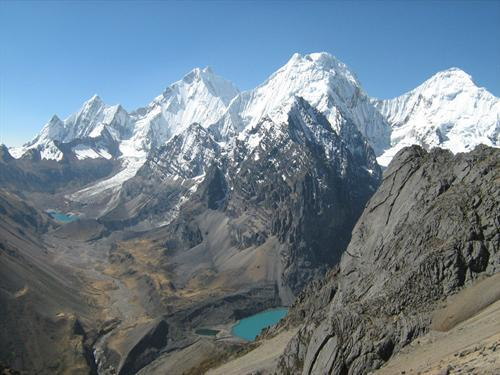
- Siula Grande in the Huayhuash

- Flag Coat of arms

- Location of Huánuco within Peru
- Country: Peru
- Capital: Huánuco
- Provinces: List: Ambo; Dos de Mayo; Huacaybamba; Huamalíes; Huánuco; Lauricocha; Leoncio Prado; Marañón; Pachitea; Puerto Inca; Yarowilca

Government
  - Type: Regional Government
  - Governor: Rubén Alva Ochoa

Area
  - Total: 36,848.85 km^{2} (14,227.42 sq mi)
- Highest elevation: 3,839 m (12,595 ft)
- Lowest elevation: 167 m (548 ft)

Population (2025)
  - Total: 807,612
  - Density: 21.9169/km^{2} (56.7645/sq mi)
- Demonym: huanuqueño/a
- UBIGEO: 10
- Dialing code: 062
- ISO 3166 code: PE-HUC
- Poverty rate: 78.9%
- Percentage of Peru's GDP: 1%
- Website: www.regionhuanuco.gob.pe

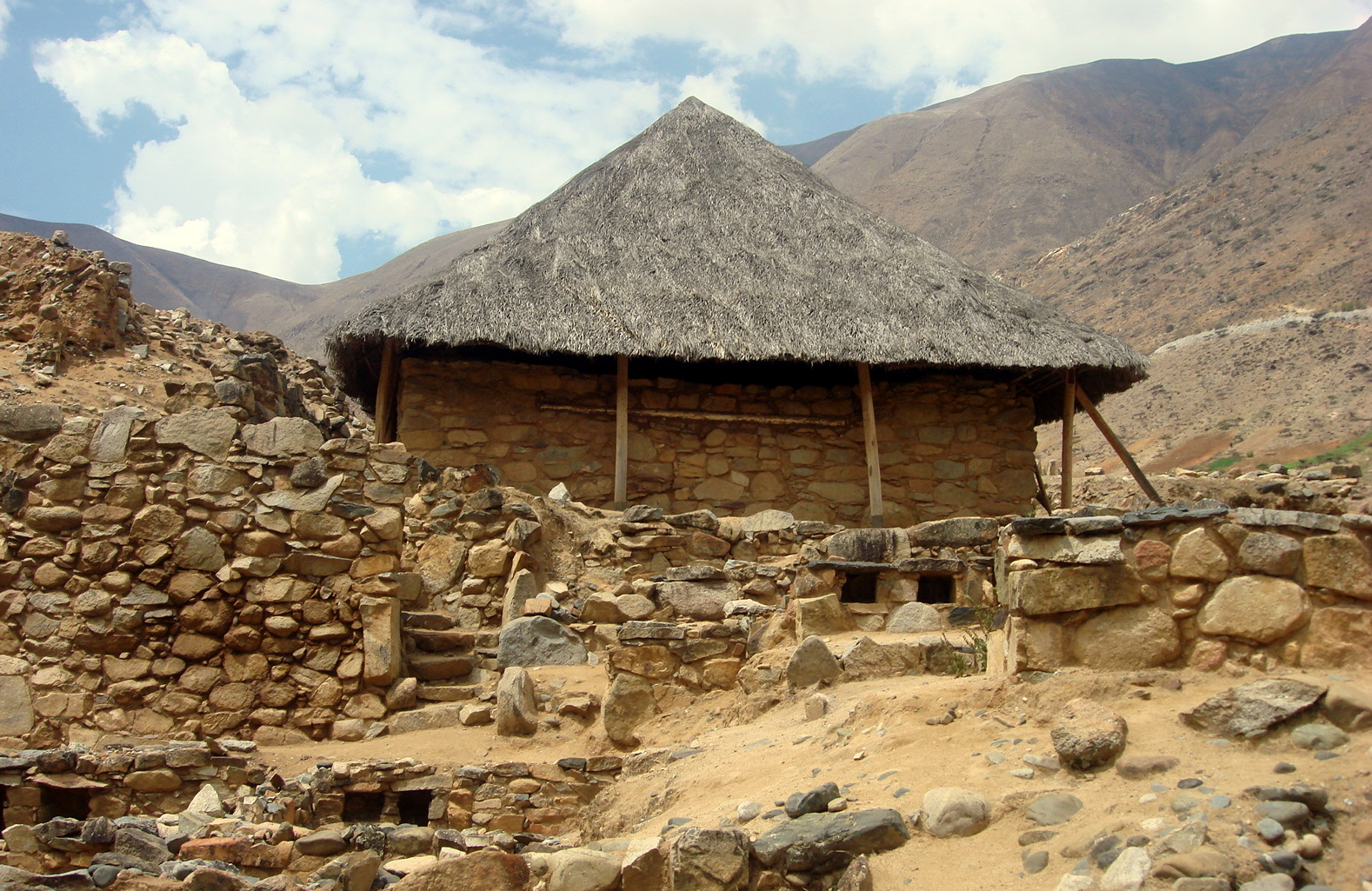
Partial view of Kotosh in the Andes.

Huánuco (Spanish pronunciation: [ˈwanuko]; Quechua: Wanuku) is a department of Peru. It is bordered by the La Libertad, San Martín, Loreto and Ucayali departments in the north, Ucayali to the east, Pasco to the south and Lima and Ancash to the west. It is administered by a regional government. Its capital is the city of Huánuco.

Huánuco has a rugged topography, comprising parts of the Sierra and the High Jungle (mountain rim) regions. Being equidistant from the north and the south of the country, it has the privilege of having a mild weather with an average annual temperature of 20 °C (68 °F).

This region is important for its geographical location, history, and for the richness of its land, where the presence of man goes back to ancient times. El Hombre de Lauricocha (Man of Lauricocha) is among the most distinctive examples, dating from 10,000 BC, as well as Kotosh, where vestiges of the oldest settlement in the Americas (4200 BC) took place.

== History ==
Several ethnic groups inhabited this region. However, after a severe resistance, they started to incorporate as part of the Inca Empire. Huánuco then became part of the Cusco-Cajamarca-Cusco route.

In the beginning of the 19th century, during the emancipation process, Huánuco was one of the first cities to promote Peru's independence. Moreover, a first oath took place in this city on December 15, 1820, after several uprisings in Huamalíes, Huallanca and Ambo.

== Political division ==
Map of provinces

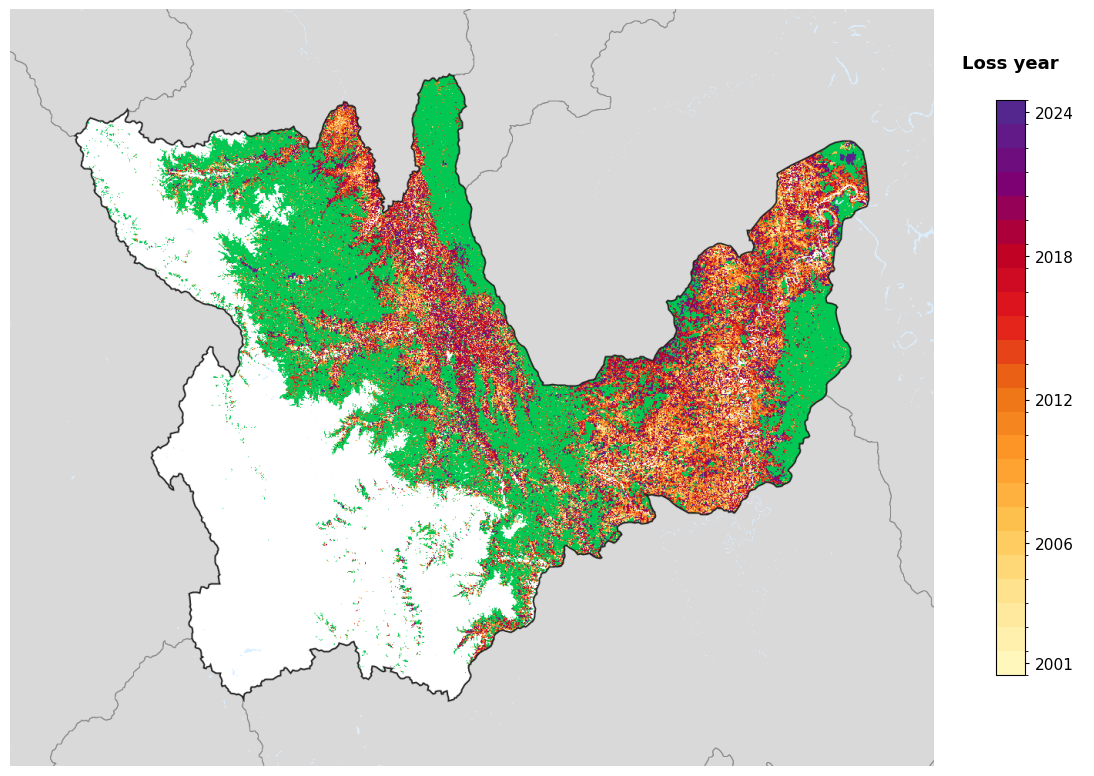
Tree-cover loss year in Huánuco, 2001-2024, from the Global Forest Change dataset.

The region is divided into 11 provinces (Spanish: provincias, singular: provincia), which are composed of 75 districts (distritos, singular: distrito).

The provinces, with their capitals in parentheses, are:

- Ambo (Ambo)
- Dos de Mayo (La Unión)
- Huacaybamba (Huacaybamba)
- Huamalíes (Llata)
- Huánuco (Huánuco)
- Lauricocha (Jesús)
- Leoncio Prado (Tingo María)
- Marañón (Huacrachuco)
- Pachitea (Panao)
- Puerto Inca (Puerto Inca)
- Yarowilca (Chavinillo)

== Demographics ==
=== Population ===
Census year	Population
1981	498,532
1993	678,041
2007	851,970
2017	759,962
2025	807,612

=== Languages ===
According to the 2007 Peru Census, the language learned first by most of the residents was Spanish (70.92%) followed by Quechua (28.56%). The Quechua variety spoken in Huánuco is Huánuco Quechua. The following table shows the results concerning the language learnt first in the Huánuco Region by province:

Province	Quechua	Aymara	Asháninka	Another native language	Spanish	Foreign language	Deaf or mute	Total
Ambo	13,141	30	9	5	38,840	2	86	52,113
Dos de Mayo	17,399	20	5	11	26,102	6	91	43,634
Huacaybamba	14,920	19	2	2	3,869	1	106	18,919
Huamalies	32,873	44	6	6	28,511	4	226	61,670
Huanuco	60,281	177	73	62	192,886	54	369	253,902
Leoncio Prado	8,990	78	30	82	99,915	19	178	109,292
Marañon	6,073	8	4	7	18,367	-	82	24,541
Pachitea	26,229	56	9	14	29,415	-	107	55,830
Puerto Inca	1,582	81	545	731	25,541	2	59	28,541
Lauricocha	3,415	17	4	8	29,481	-	23	32,948
Yarowilca	18,308	30	6	2	11,633	-	49	30,028
Total	203,211	560	693	930	504,560	88	1,376	711,418
%	28.56	0.08	0.10	0.13	70.92	0.01	0.19	100.00

== Places of interest ==
- Awkillu Waqra
- Awkimarka
- El Sira Communal Reserve
- Qillqay Mach'ay
- Huayhuash mountain range
