= Apujirca Punta =

Mountain in Peru

- Location within Peru

Highest point
- Elevation: 4,200 m (13,800 ft)
- Coordinates: 9°38′56″S 76°23′53″W

Geography
- Location: Huánuco Region
- Parent range: Andes

Apujirca Punta (possibly from Quechua apu an Andean deity, hirka mountain, punta horn) is a mountain in the Andes of Peru which reaches a height of approximately 4,200 m (13,800 ft). It is located in the Huánuco Region, Huánuco Province, Churubamba District. Apujirca Punta lies northwest of Sagrahuagra and south of Machay.
