= Beker =

Beker may refer to:

== People ==
- Avi Beker (1951–2015), Israeli writer, statesman, and professor
- Gisela Beker (1932–2015), German-American artist
- Jeanne Beker (born 1952), Canadian television personality, author and newspaper columnist
- Józef Beker (1937–2026), Polish Olympic cyclist
- Nicolas Léonard Beker (1770–1840), French general
- Beker Fabian (born 1963), Peruvian poet and writer

== Other ==
- KNVB Beker, a Dutch soccer trophy
- Dutch Cup (ice hockey), also known as the Beker, a Dutch ice hockey trophy

== See also ==
- Becker (surname)
- Beker (Turkish surname)
