= Huánuco province =

Coordinates: 9.9167°S 76.2334°W

Huánuco
- Province
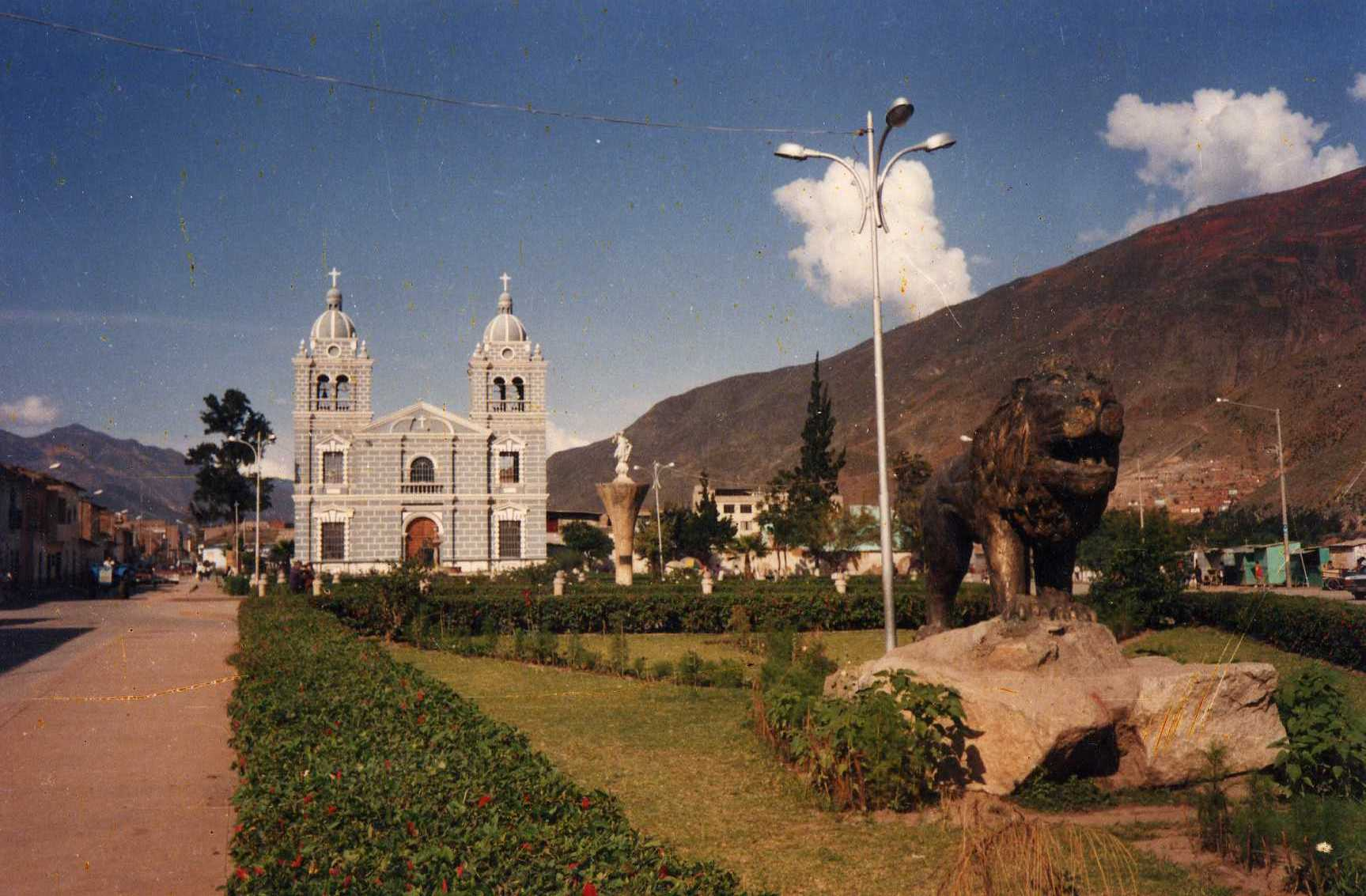
- San Sebastian church in Huánuco

- Flag Coat of arms

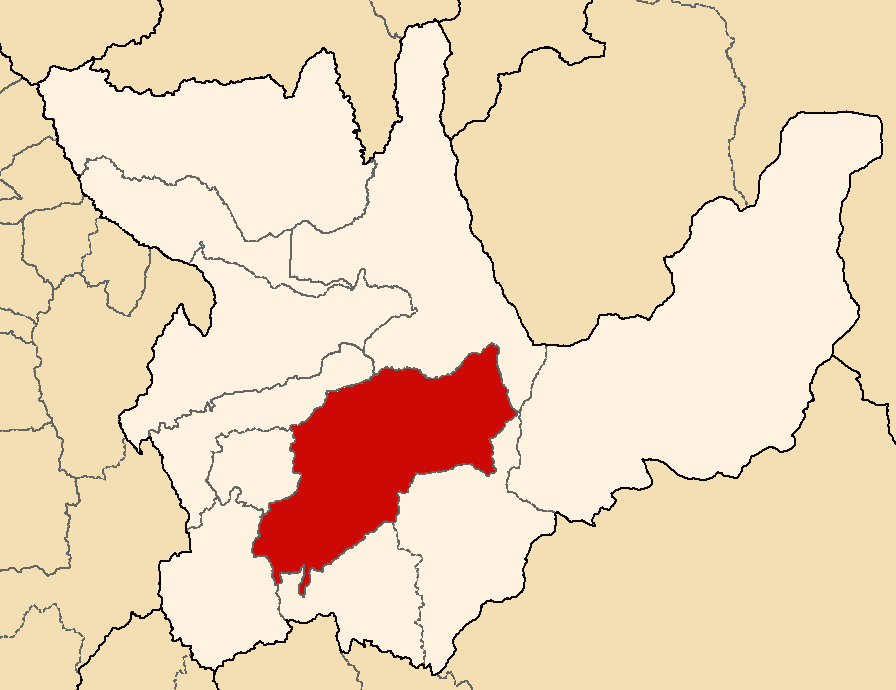
- Location of Huánuco in the Huánuco Region
- Country: Peru
- Region: Huánuco
- Capital: Huánuco

Government
  - Mayor: José Luis Villavicencio Guardia (2019-2022)

Area
  - Total: 4,022.54 km^{2} (1,553.11 sq mi)

Population
  - Total: 254,133
  - Density: 63.1772/km^{2} (163.628/sq mi)
- UBIGEO: 1001
- Website: www.huanuco.mp.gob.pe

Huánuco is one of 11 provinces of the Huánuco Region in Peru. The capital of the province is the city of Huánuco.

== Geography ==
Some of the highest mountains of the province are listed below:

- Allqay
- Apu Hirka Punta
- Awkin Punta
- Hanka Punta
- Hatun Hirka
- Hatun P'unqu
- Khuchi Mach'ay
- Luychuqucha
- Mach'ay
- Mataqucha
- Millpu
- Millpu Punta
- Munti Wasi
- Phiruruyuq
- Qalluqucha
- Qiwllaqucha (Cayrán-Chaulán)
- Qiwllaqucha (Chaulán)
- Runtuqucha Punta
- Saqra Waqra
- Saqsa Punta
- Tuqtuqucha Punta
- Wallpa Wasi
- Waman Qaqa
- Yanashallash
- Yawarqucha
- Yuraq Qaqa

== Political division ==
The province is divided into twelve districts.

- Amarilis (Paucarbamba)
- Chinchao (Acomayo)
- Churubamba (Churubamba)
- Huánuco (Huánuco)
- Margos (Margos)
- Pillco Marca (Cayhuayna)
- Quisqui (Huancapallac)
- San Francisco de Cayrán (Cayrán)
- San Pedro de Chaulán (Chaulán)
- Santa María del Valle (Santa María del Valle)
- Yacus
- Yarumayo (Yarumayo)

== Ethnic groups ==
The province is inhabited by indigenous citizens of Quechua descent. Spanish is the language which the majority of the population (75.97%) learnt to speak in childhood, 23.74% of the residents started speaking using the Quechua language (2007 Peru Census).

== Events ==
On 21 December 2005, eight Peruvian policemen were killed by Shining Path terrorists. The policemen were involved in the government's efforts of destroying coca crops.

On 19 November 2009, Peruvian policemen reported apprehending gang members suspected of killing people in Huanuco Province for their fat and selling the fat on the black market for use in cosmetics in Europe. Three suspects confessed to killing 5 people and told the police that the fat was worth $60,000 a gallon. At least 60 people are reported missing this year in province of Huanuco.

== See also ==
- Administrative divisions of Peru
- Aqumayu
- Coca eradication
- Killa Rumi
- Qiwllaqucha
- Tuna Mach'ay
- Wanakawri
