= Saqsa Punta =

Mountain in Peru

- Location within Peru

Highest point
- Elevation: 4,083 m (13,396 ft)
- Coordinates: 9°38′28″S 76°23′00″W

Geography
- Location: Huánuco Region
- Parent range: Andes

Saqsa Punta (Quechua saqsa multi-colored, punta peak, ridge, "multi-colored peak (or ridge)", also spelled Sacsa Punta) is a 4,083-metre-high (13,396 ft) mountain in the Andes of Peru. It is located in the Huánuco Region, Huánuco Province, Churubamba District. Saqsa Punta lies north of Saqra Waqra.
