= Qiwllaqucha (Cayrán-Chaulán) =

Mountain in Peru

- Location within Peru

Highest point
- Elevation: 4,200 m (13,800 ft)
- Coordinates: 10°02′07″S 76°23′11″W

Geography
- Location: Huánuco Region, Huánuco Province, San Francisco de Cayrán District, San Pedro de Chaulán District
- Parent range: Andes

Qillwaqucha (Quechua qillwa, qiwlla, qiwiña gull, qucha lake, "gull lake", also spelled Quiuluacocha) is a mountain in the Andes of Peru which reaches a height of approximately 4,200 m (13,800 ft). It is located in the Huánuco Region, Huánuco Province, on the border of the districts of Cayrán and Chaulán. It lies southwest of Munti Wasi and a mountain named Yawarqucha ("blood lake").
