= Huánuco District =

Coordinates: 9°55′40″S 76°14′00″W

Huánuco Wanuku
- District
- Interactive map of Huánuco
- Country: Peru
- Region: Huánuco
- Province: Huánuco
- Capital: Huánuco

Government
  - Mayor: Juan Antonio Jara Gallardo and known as “Toño” (2023-present)

Area
  - Total: 96.55 km^{2} (37.28 sq mi)
- Elevation: 1,894 m (6,214 ft)

Population (2017)
  - Total: 89,502
  - Density: 927.0/km^{2} (2,401/sq mi)
- Time zone: UTC-5 (PET)
- UBIGEO: 100101

Huánuco District is one of twelve districts of the province Huánuco in Peru.

== Climate ==
Climate data for Canchan, Huanuco, elevation 1,986 m (6,516 ft), (1991–2020)
| Month | Jan | Feb | Mar | Apr | May | Jun | Jul | Aug | Sep | Oct | Nov | Dec | Year |
|---|---|---|---|---|---|---|---|---|---|---|---|---|---|
| Mean daily maximum °C (°F) | 26.5 (79.7) | 26.3 (79.3) | 26.0 (78.8) | 26.7 (80.1) | 27.0 (80.6) | 26.5 (79.7) | 26.0 (78.8) | 26.4 (79.5) | 26.9 (80.4) | 27.2 (81.0) | 27.4 (81.3) | 26.7 (80.1) | 26.6 (79.9) |
| Mean daily minimum °C (°F) | 14.5 (58.1) | 14.6 (58.3) | 14.6 (58.3) | 13.8 (56.8) | 12.4 (54.3) | 10.7 (51.3) | 9.9 (49.8) | 10.8 (51.4) | 12.5 (54.5) | 13.8 (56.8) | 14.3 (57.7) | 14.6 (58.3) | 13.0 (55.5) |
| Average precipitation mm (inches) | 64.4 (2.54) | 66.9 (2.63) | 74.6 (2.94) | 32.6 (1.28) | 13.2 (0.52) | 5.7 (0.22) | 5.0 (0.20) | 7.1 (0.28) | 13.4 (0.53) | 43.6 (1.72) | 45.8 (1.80) | 74.8 (2.94) | 447.1 (17.6) |
Source: National Meteorology and Hydrology Service of Peru

== See also ==
- Administrative divisions of Peru
- Killa Rumi
