= Queuluacocha (Chaulán) =

Mountain in Peru

- Location within Peru

Highest point
- Elevation: 4,525 m (14,846 ft)
- Coordinates: 10°05′39″S 76°24′08″W

Geography
- Location: Huánuco Region, Huánuco Province, San Pedro de Chaulán District
- Parent range: Andes

Queuluacocha (Quechua qillwa, qiwlla, qiwiña gull, qucha lake, "gull lake") is a 4,525-metre-high (14,846 ft) mountain in the Andes of Peru at a small lake of that name. It is located in the Huánuco Region, Huánuco Province, Chaulán District. It is southwest of Algay.

The lake named Queuluacocha lies west of the peak at 10°05′44″S 76°25′27″W.
