= Pillco Marca District =

Coordinates: 9°57′42″S 76°14′49″W

Pillco Marca Pillku Marka
- District
- Interactive map of Pillco Marca
- Country: Peru
- Region: Huánuco
- Province: Huánuco
- Founded: May 5, 2000
- Capital: Cayhuayna

Government
  - Mayor: Isabel Davila Cardenas

Area
  - Total: 68.74 km^{2} (26.54 sq mi)
- Elevation: 1,930 m (6,330 ft)

Population (2005 census)
  - Total: 21,017
  - Density: 305.7/km^{2} (791.9/sq mi)
- Time zone: UTC-5 (PET)
- UBIGEO: 100111

Pillco Marca District is one of twelve districts of the province Huánuco in Peru.
