= Beker Fabian =

Peruvian-Italian poet and writer

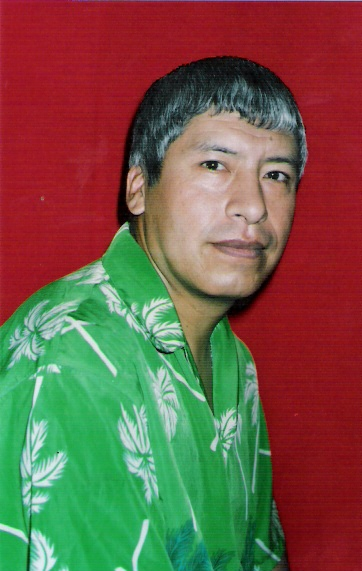
- Born: Beker Simón Fabián De Lao; July 31, 1963 (age 63); Margos, Huánuco, Peru
- Education: Diploma in pedagogy and education
- Occupations: poet and writer
- Writing career
- Pen name: Poeta Viandante
- Language: Spanish and Italian

Beker Fabian or the Waufarer Poet, born Beker Simón Fabián De Lao, is a naturalized Italian Peruvian poet and writer. He is active in Peru, where he promotes diffusion of literature among young people, with literary events and poetry contests in the schools of the Andean and Amazon areas – where the mass media (including internet) still arrive with difficulty – and also in Italy, where he strives to highlight in his work and in social and literary events, the importance of dialogue and mutual exchange between different cultures, and he supports the integration of migrants and people with disabilities in the social structure.

== Biography ==
Beker Simon Fabian was born in Margos, in the district of Huanuco, Peru, on July 31, 1963. He spent his infancy on the Andes with his grandparents and brothers, speaking the local Quechuan language and learning Spanish in primary school. At the age of 14 he became independent from his numerous family members, who had already moved to Lima, working to complete his studies and beginning to travel through many provinces of Perú. To this period pertain his first poems. Achieving his diploma in pedagogy and education, he dedicated himself to teaching in the area of Amazonian border, valorizing local culture and innovating the outdated school programs, for eight years. Because of conflicts with Alberto Fujimori's regime, he left teaching and began touring all over South America, giving seminaries of oratory and taking part in international congresses of the Quechuan language.

In 1998 he arrived in Europe and settled in Italy, where he began to dedicate himself to his first and true passion for poetry, deepening his studies and learning the Italian and English languages. There, in 1999, he became an integral part of the Peruvian community in the city of Ancona and was elected as vice-president for a period of two years. In this city, he met the woman of his life, Alice Bellesi, and they tied the knot; this experience deeply marked his life and his work, and 15 years later it would become the essence of a book. Together with his yearned muse he traveled all over Europe: Italy, Spain, France, Belgium, Netherlands, Switzerland, Ireland, England, Wales, Scotland – and he continues traveling. These journeys are reflected and transfigured in his poetical work.

In 2011 his first book, a collection of poems entitled Eternal Wayfarer (Eterno Viandante), was published: he undertook a tour of presentations which touched many Italian cities and participated with this work at the international literary event Babele Festival, in the town of Montecosaro, filmed by local television and presented online. In 2012 he undertook a tour of presentations of this book in Peru too, involving municipalities, libraries and schools.

In 2013 Elixir of Love (Elisir d’amore), a book in poetry and poetical prose co-authored with his wife, was published, so he undertook a tour of presentations in Italy. In 2014 this tour continued in Peru.

In 2015 he recorded a no-profit audio version of this book for the Italian Union of Blind and Partially Sighted People and the Institute of Rehabilitation Research and Training (UIC and IRIFOR) of Macerata.

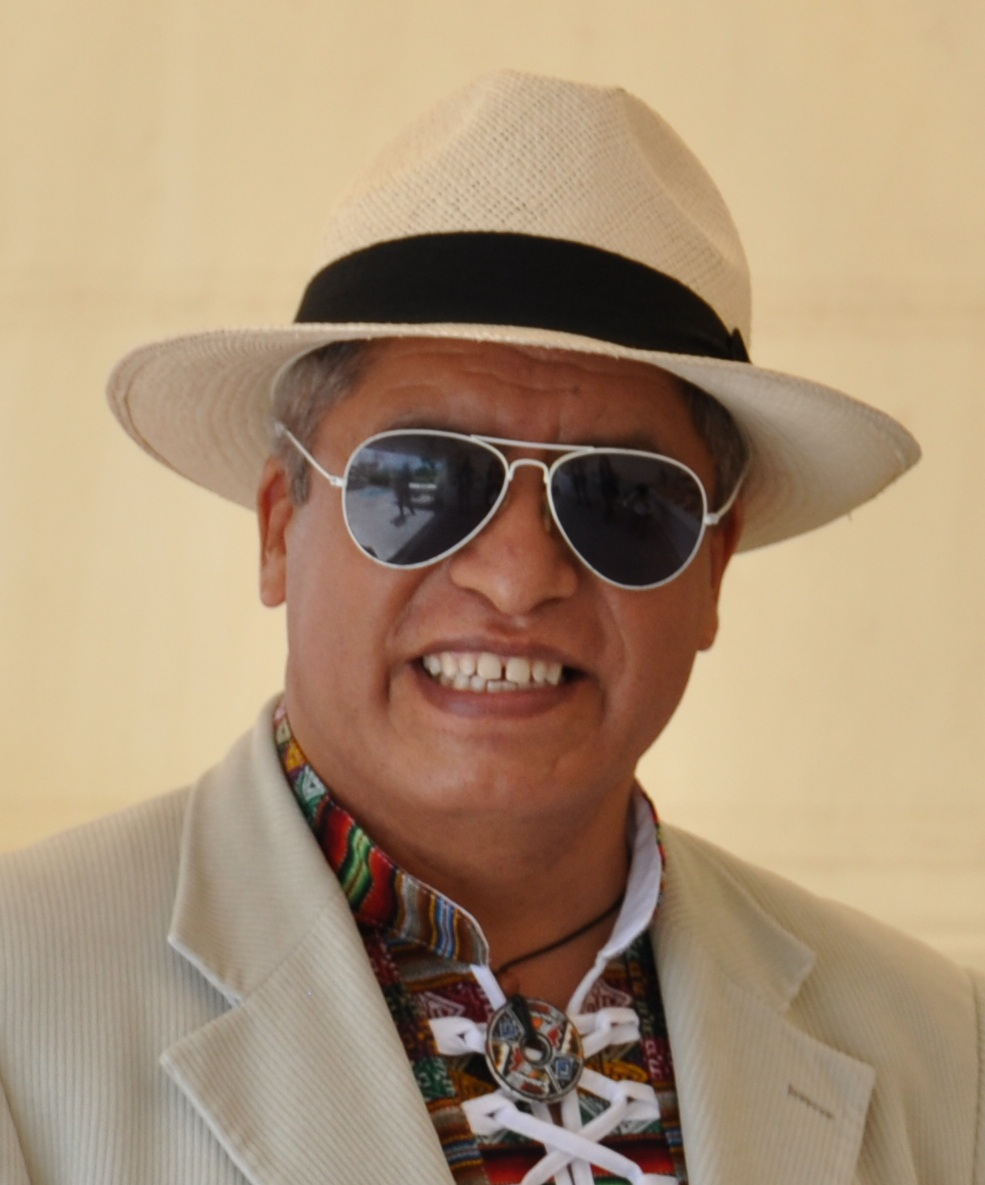
Beker Fabian Poeta Viandante

== Honours and awards ==
- In 2005 he won the special prize Cara pace ti scrivo 2005 with the poem Il potere dell’amore.
- In 2006 he obtained the certificate of appointment as World Poets Consul (Cónsul de Poetas del mundo en Macerata, Italia) in the province of Macerata, Italy, from the association Movimiento Poetas del Mundo.
- In 2008 he was awarded with the Mention of Honour of the section Estero of the international prize The Rainbow of life (L’Arcobaleno della Vita, with the poem In the shadow of peace (All’ombra della pace).
- In December 2011 he received, for his work Eterno Viandante, the official congratulations from the current president of the Republic of Peru, Ollanta Humala.
- In 2013 he obtained the Diploma of Recognition from the Ministry of Culture for participating with his work Eterno Viandante in the Cultural Fridays in Huanuco, Peru.

== Works ==
- Dear peace I write (Cara pace ti scrivo) – poetry and prose from the literary contest created to spread a culture of peace – curated by Domenico Monti, published in 2005
- Eternal Wayfarer (Eterno Viandante) – collection of poems in Spanish with translation in Italian, published in 2011
- Instants of Infinity – Anthology of Poetry and Visual Arts – Special Edition for the World Poetry Movement (Istanti d’Infinito 3 – Antologia di Arti Figurative e Poesia – Edizione Speciale WPM – Movimento Mondiale della Poesia) - published in 2012 with Associazione Culturale Leopardian Community Coro a più voci, with contributions from several authors
- Elixir of Love (Elisir d’amore) - book in poetry and poetic prose in Italian and Spanish published in 2013, co-authors Beker Fabian & Alice Bellesi
- Elixir of Love Audiobook – non-profit online MP3 version of the book produced in 2015 for Macerata Sections of UIC and IRIFOR

== Bibliography ==
- AA, VV (2005). Cara Pace ti scrivo. Cesena: Società editrice di Ponte Vecchio. ISBN 88-8312-377-8.
- Beker, Fabian (2011). Eterno Viandante. Lima: Arteidea Grupo Editorial Peruano. ISBN 978-612-45800-8-6.
- AA, VV (2013). Istanti d'Infinito 3. Fermo: Capodarco Fermano Edizioni. ISBN 978-88-95757-17-9.
- Beker Fabian, & Alice Bellesi (2013). Elisir d'amore. Lima: Arteidea Grupo Editorial Peruano. ISBN 978-612-4187-01-8.
- Newspaper article Un "Elisir d’amore" in Piazza Brancondi

== See also ==
- Gustavo Adolfo Bécquer – romantic Spanish poet
- Matsuo Bashō – Japanese traveling master of haiku poetry
- The Road Goes Ever On – walking song cycle by J. R. R. Tolkien
- Wanderer above the Sea of Fog – painting by the German romantic painter Caspar David Friedrich
- L'elisir d'amore – opera by Gaetano Donizetti
