= Beker (Turkish surname) =

Turkish surname of Turkic origin

- Language: Turkish, Turkic

Origin
- Origin: Old Turkic
- Meaning: "Strong or trusted soldier"

Other names
- Related names: Becker
- See also: Beker (disambiguation)

Beker is a Turkish surname of Turkic origin, with the combination of the words "bek" and "er". When combined, the name translates to "strong or trusted soldier".

Although it shares an identical spelling with variants of the European surname Becker, the Turkish name is completely distinct in origin.

== Etymology ==
The name is derived from two Old Turkic roots:

- Bek: This root has two converging etymological origins in Turkic languages that are commonly used in nomenclature.
  - Adjective root: It derives from the Proto-Turkic adjective *bek, meaning "firm", "solid", or "stable". The official dictionary of the Turkish language maintains this definition today, listing bek as an adjective meaning sağlam (solid/sturdy) and sert (firm/hard).
  - Noun/Title root: Morphologically, bek also functions as an alternative spelling of the Old Turkic title beg (modern Turkish Bey), which translates to "lord", "chieftain", or "master", and was historically used as an honorific suffix or prefix in Turkic names.
- Er: The second root is the Old Turkic noun er. The official dictionary of the Turkish language defines the word as "man" (erkek), "hero" or "brave" (kahraman), and "soldier" or "private" (asker or nefer). Furthermore, academic studies on historical Turkic military terminology establish that er was the most widespread term used to designate a soldier or warrior in early Turkic inscriptions.

== Notable people with the surname ==
- Adnan Beker (born 1964), Turkish businessman and politician, member of the Grand National Assembly of Turkey

== See also ==
- Beker (disambiguation)
