= Wallpa Wasi =

Mountain in Peru

- Location within Peru

Highest point
- Elevation: 4,000 m (13,000 ft)
- Coordinates: 10°01′13″S 76°24′45″W

Geography
- Location: Huánuco Region
- Parent range: Andes

Wallpa Wasi (Quechua wallpa hen, wasi house, "hen house", also spelled Huallpahuasi) is a mountain in the Andes of Peru which reaches a height of approximately 4,000 m (13,000 ft). It is located in the Huánuco Region, Huánuco Province, San Pedro de Chaulán District.
