= Quiullacocha (Huánuco) =

Lake in Peru

- Location within Peru
- Location: Peru; Huánuco Region, Huánuco Province
- Coordinates: 9°31′47″S 76°28′38″W

Quiullacocha (possibly from Quechua qillwa, qiwlla, qiwiña gull, qucha lake, "gull lake") is a small lake in Peru located in the Huánuco Region, Huánuco Province, Chinchao District, north of Acomayo.

== See also ==
- Acomayo River
- Wanakawri
