= Acomayo River (Huánuco) =

- Etymology: Quechua

Location
- Country: Peru
- Region: Huánuco Region

Physical characteristics
- Mouth: Huallaga River
  - coordinates: 9°49′16″S 76°03′37″W

Acomayo River (possibly from Quechua aqu sand, mayu river, "sand river") is a river in Peru located in the Huánuco Region, Huánuco Province, Chinchao District. It is a left tributary of the Huallaga River. The confluence is southeast of the town Acomayo, near the village Tingo Pampa.

== See also ==
- Quiullacocha
- Wanakawri
