= Quisqui District =

Coordinates: 9°54′06″S 76°26′28″W

Quisqui Kiski
- District
- Interactive map of Quisqui
- Country: Peru
- Region: Huánuco
- Province: Huánuco
- Founded: January 26, 1956
- Capital: Huancapallac

Government
  - Mayor: Felix Elvis Acosta Gonzales

Area
  - Total: 157.34 km^{2} (60.75 sq mi)
- Elevation: 2,500 m (8,200 ft)

Population (2005 census)
  - Total: 5,276
  - Density: 33.53/km^{2} (86.85/sq mi)
- Time zone: UTC-5 (PET)
- UBIGEO: 100106

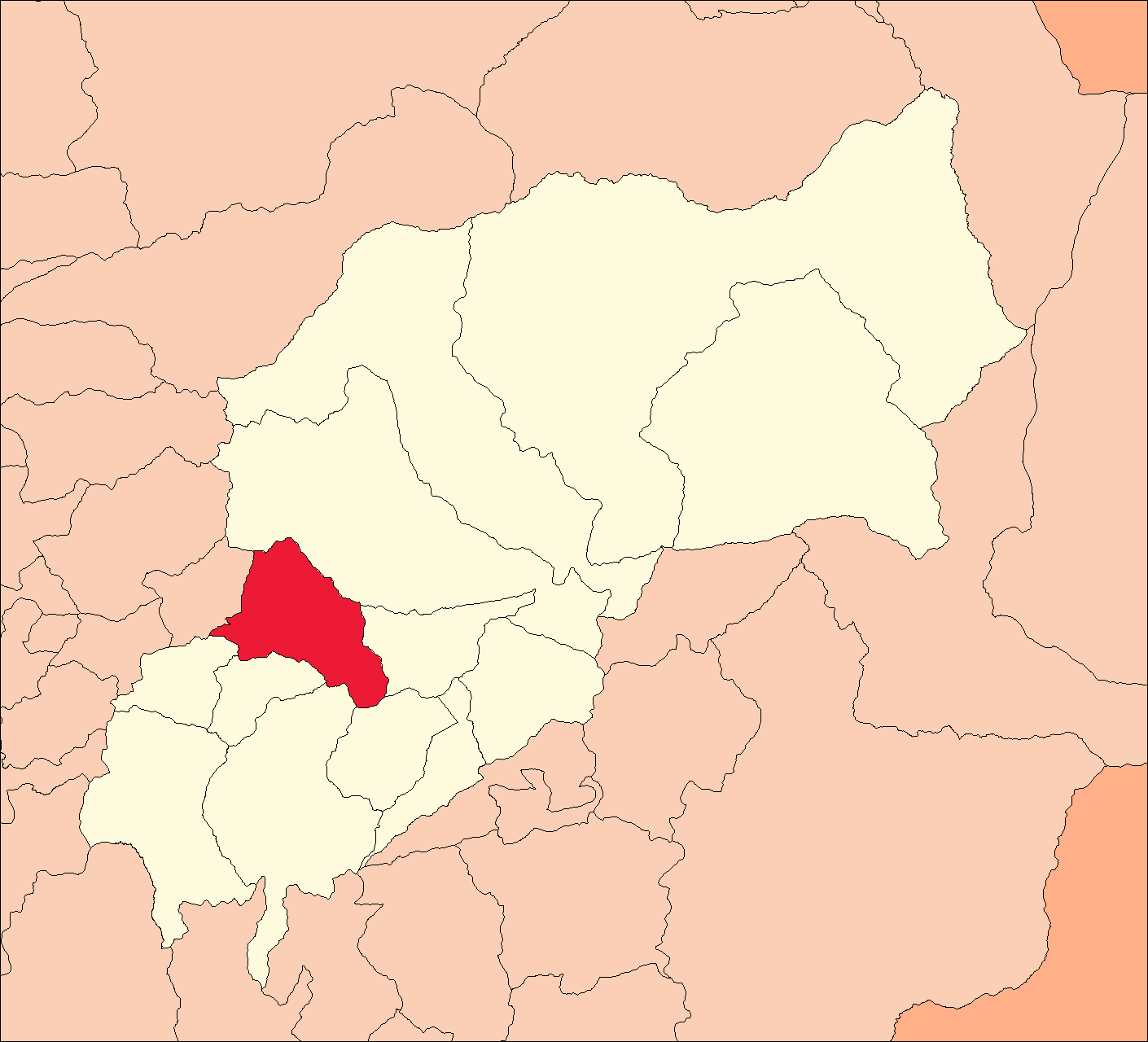

Quisqui District is one of twelve districts of the province Huánuco in Peru.
