= San Pedro de Chaulán District =

Coordinates: 10°03′07″S 76°29′01″W

San Pedro de Chaulán Chawlan
- District
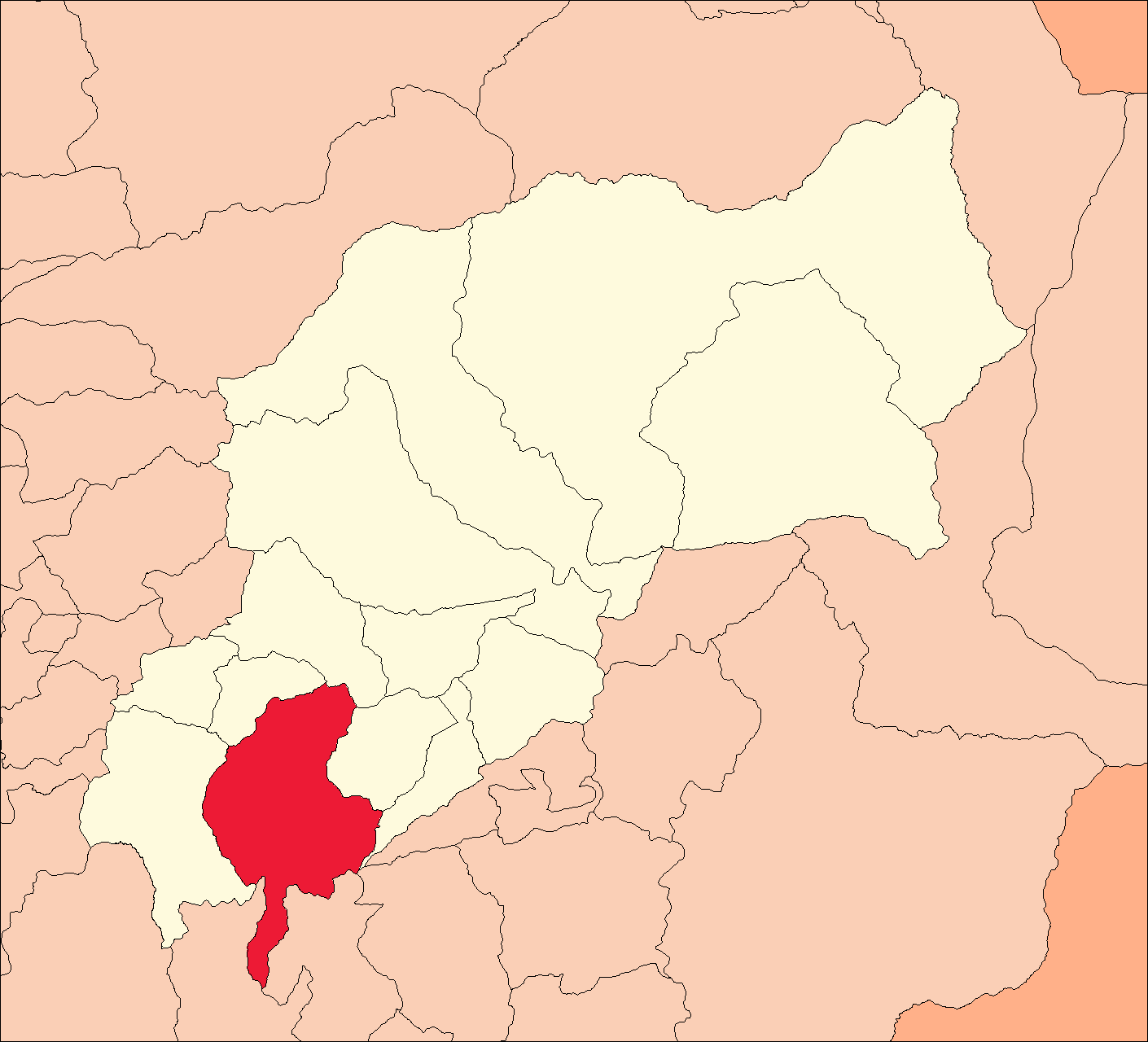
- Interactive map of San Pedro de Chaulán
- Country: Peru
- Region: Huánuco
- Province: Huánuco
- Founded: May 16, 1936
- Capital: Chaulán

Government
  - Mayor: Celio Rios Cruz

Area
  - Total: 275.06 km^{2} (106.20 sq mi)
- Elevation: 3,552 m (11,654 ft)

Population (2005 census)
  - Total: 5,558
  - Density: 20.21/km^{2} (52.33/sq mi)
- Time zone: UTC-5 (PET)
- UBIGEO: 100108

San Pedro de Chaulán District is one of twelve districts of the province Huánuco in Peru.

== Ethnic groups ==
The people in the district are mainly indigenous citizens of Quechua descent. Quechua is the language which the majority of the population (82.04%) learnt to speak in childhood, 17.79% of the residents started speaking using the Spanish language (2007 Peru Census).

== See also ==
- Allqay
- Munti Wasi
- Qiwllaqucha (Chaulán)
- Qiwllaqucha (Cayrán-Chaulán)
- Wallpa Wasi
