= San Francisco de Cayrán District =

Coordinates: 9°59′45″S 76°18′30″W

San Francisco de Cayrán
- District
- Interactive map of San Francisco de Cayrán
- Country: Peru
- Region: Huánuco
- Province: Huánuco
- Founded: May 10, 1955
- Capital: Cayrán

Government
  - Mayor: Manuel Armando Jara Alvarado

Area
  - Total: 97.33 km^{2} (37.58 sq mi)
- Elevation: 2,400 m (7,900 ft)

Population (2005 census)
  - Total: 5,056
  - Density: 51.95/km^{2} (134.5/sq mi)
- Time zone: UTC-5 (PET)
- UBIGEO: 100107

San Francisco de Cayrán District is one of twelve districts of the province Huánuco in Peru.

== See also ==
- Munti Wasi
- Qiwllaqucha
