= Churubamba District =

Coordinates: 9°46′20″S 76°05′41″W

Churubamba
- District
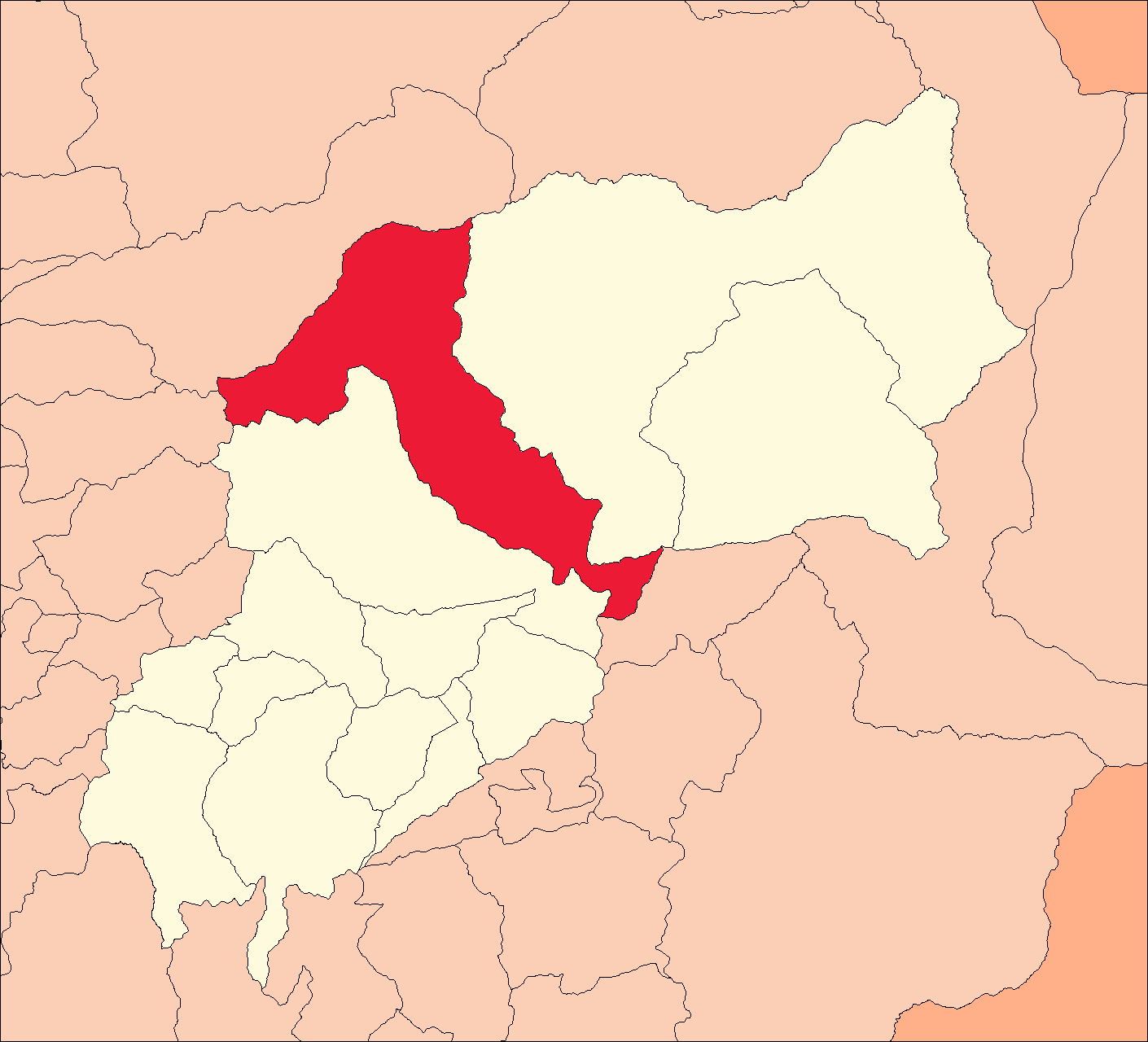
- Area of the district Churumbamba
- Interactive map of Churubamba
- Country: Peru
- Region: Huánuco
- Province: Huánuco
- Founded: October 4, 1921
- Capital: Churubamba

Area
  - Total: 552.27 km^{2} (213.23 sq mi)
- Elevation: 2,000 m (6,600 ft)

Population (2005 census)
  - Total: 18,542
  - Density: 33.574/km^{2} (86.957/sq mi)
- Time zone: UTC-5 (PET)
- UBIGEO: 100104

Churubamba District is one of twelve districts of the province Huánuco in Peru.

== Ethnic groups ==
The people in the district are mainly indigenous citizens of Quechua descent. Quechua is the language which the majority of the population (71.16%) learnt to speak in childhood, 28.48% of the residents started speaking using the Spanish language (2007 Peru Census).

== See also ==
- Apu Hirka Punta
- Hatun Hirka
- Mach'ay
- Saqra Waqra
- Saqsa Punta
