= Margos District =

Coordinates: 10°00′05″S 76°31′11″W

Margos
- District
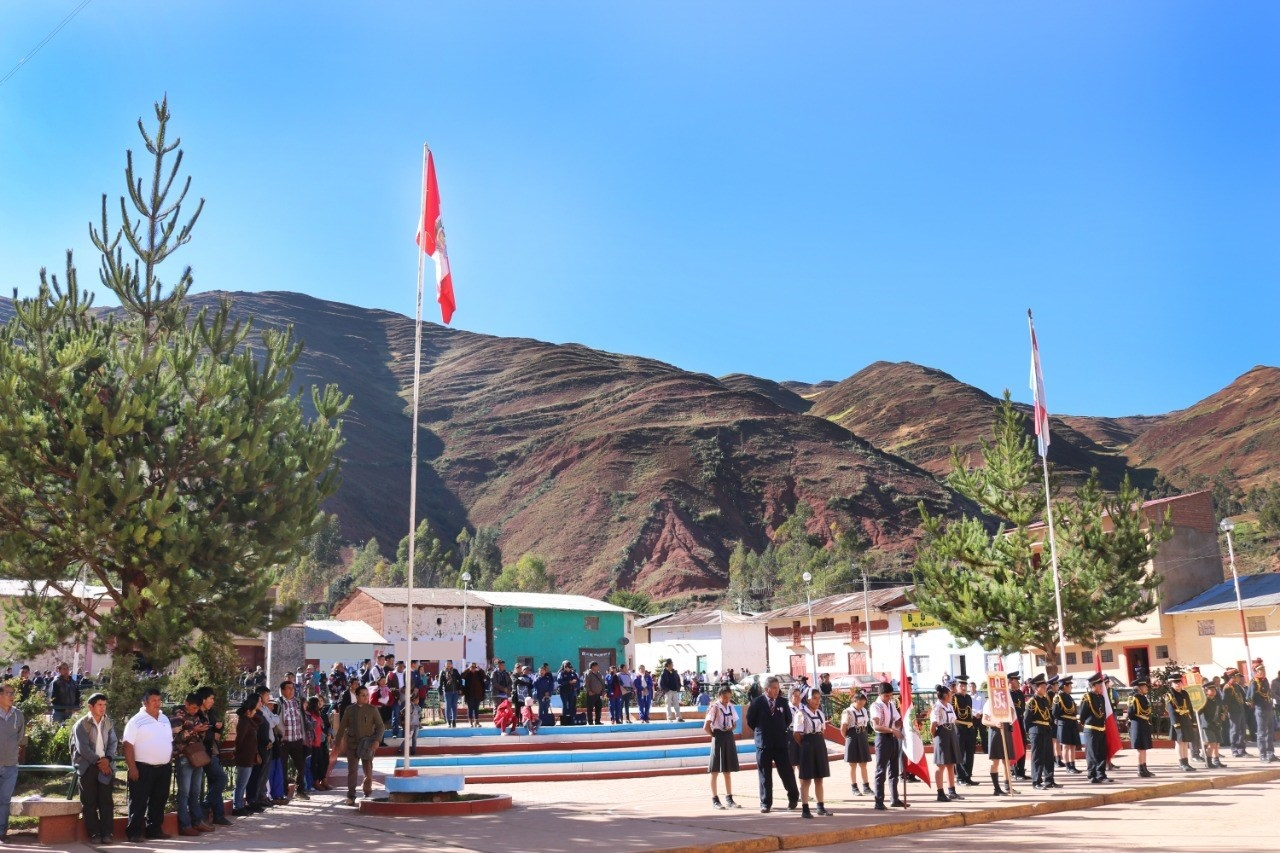
- View of the Plaza Mayor de Margos, the district capital
- Interactive map of Margos
- Country: Peru
- Region: Huánuco
- Province: Huánuco
- Founded: September 10, 1906
- Capital: Margos, Peru

Government
  - Mayor: Simion Casimiro Castro Esteban

Area
  - Total: 282.53 km^{2} (109.09 sq mi)
- Elevation: 3,539 m (11,611 ft)

Population (2005 census)
  - Total: 11,323
  - Density: 40.077/km^{2} (103.80/sq mi)
- Time zone: UTC-5 (PET)
- UBIGEO: 100105

Margos District is one of twelve districts of the province Huánuco in Peru.

== Ethnic groups ==
The people in the district are mainly indigenous citizens of Quechua descent. Quechua is the language which the majority of the population (70.88%) learnt to speak in childhood, 28.83% of the residents started speaking using the Spanish language (2007 Peru Census).
