= Huánuco =

Huánuco Wanuku Caballeros del León de Huánuco
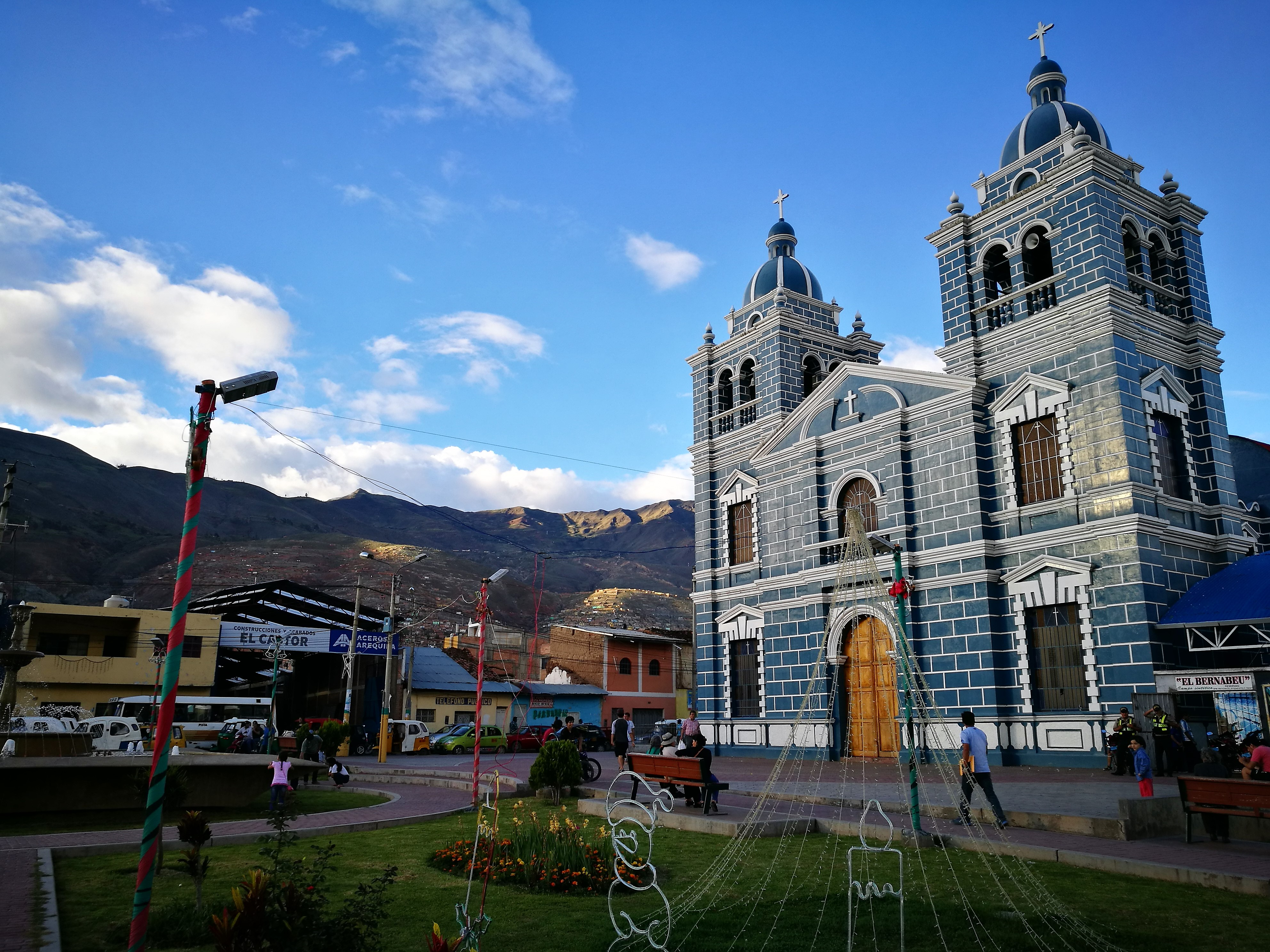
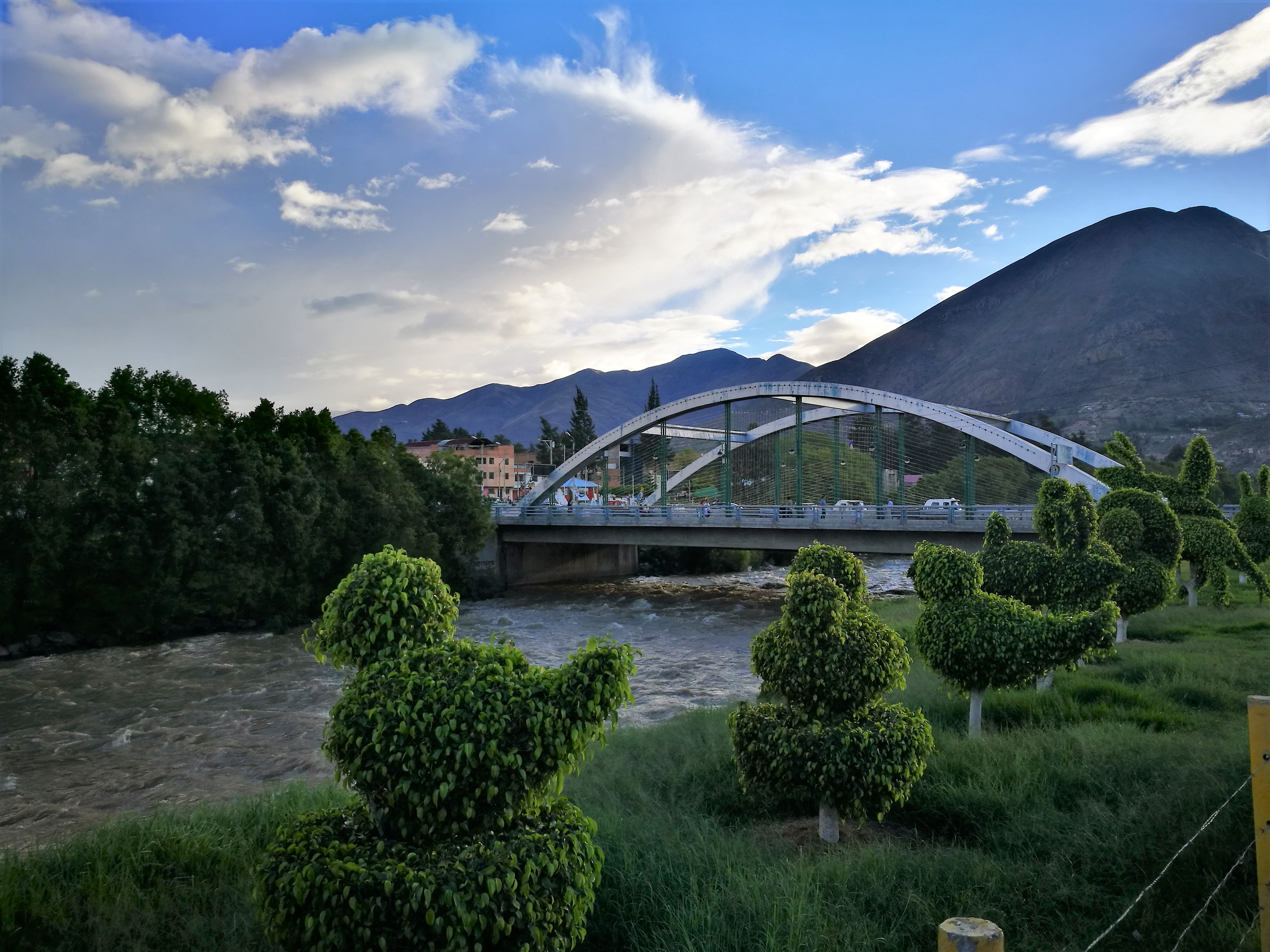
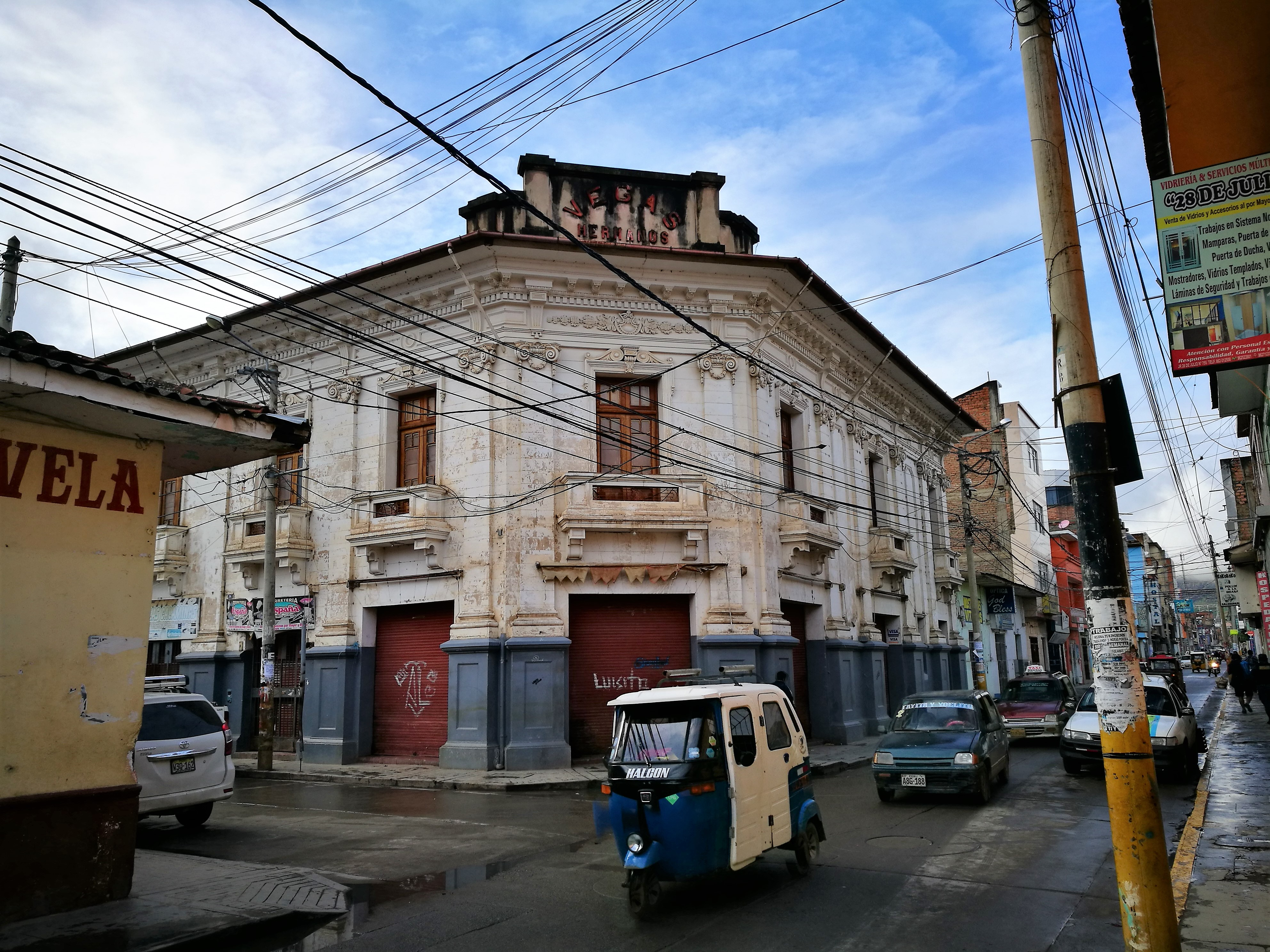
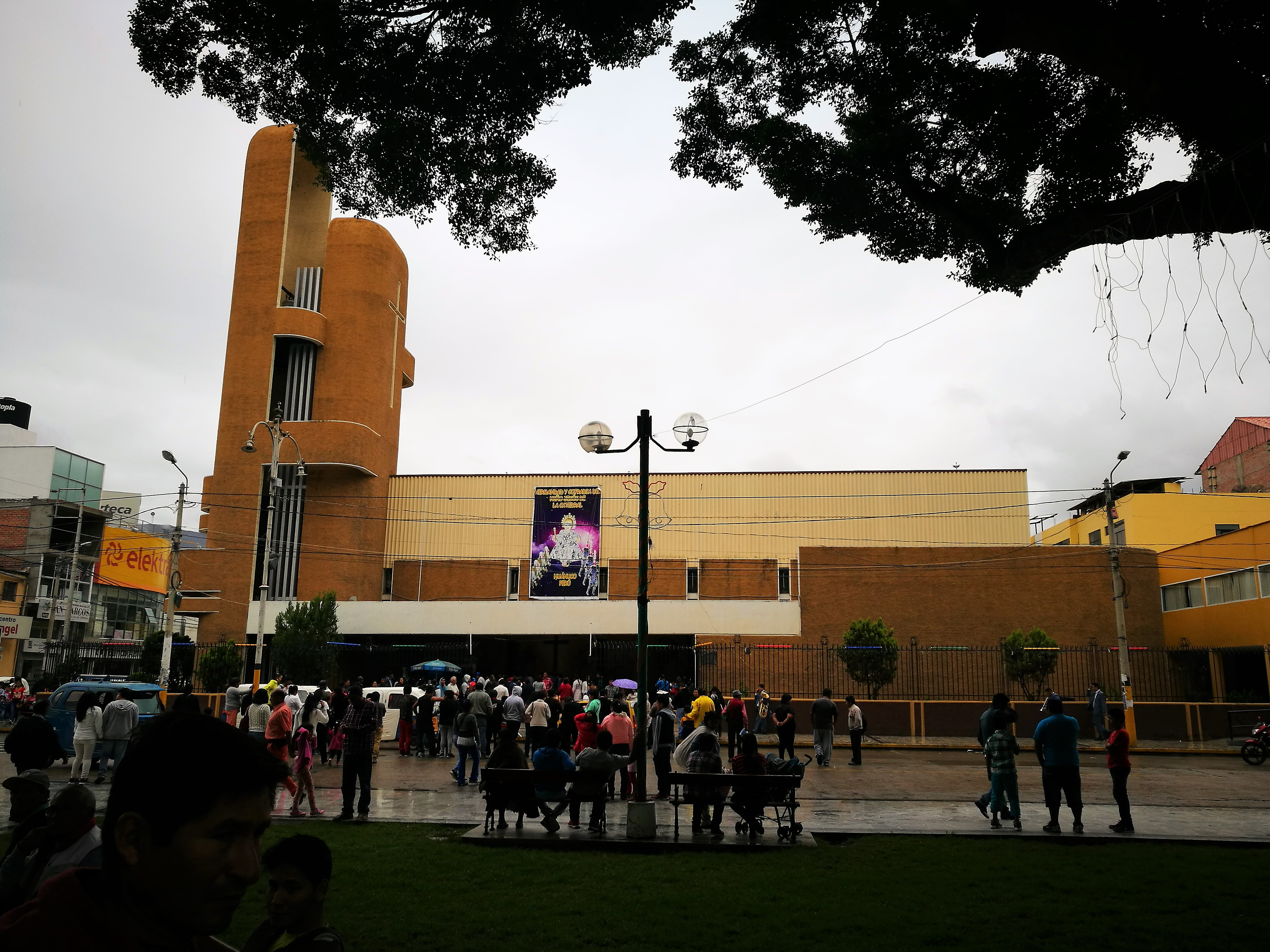
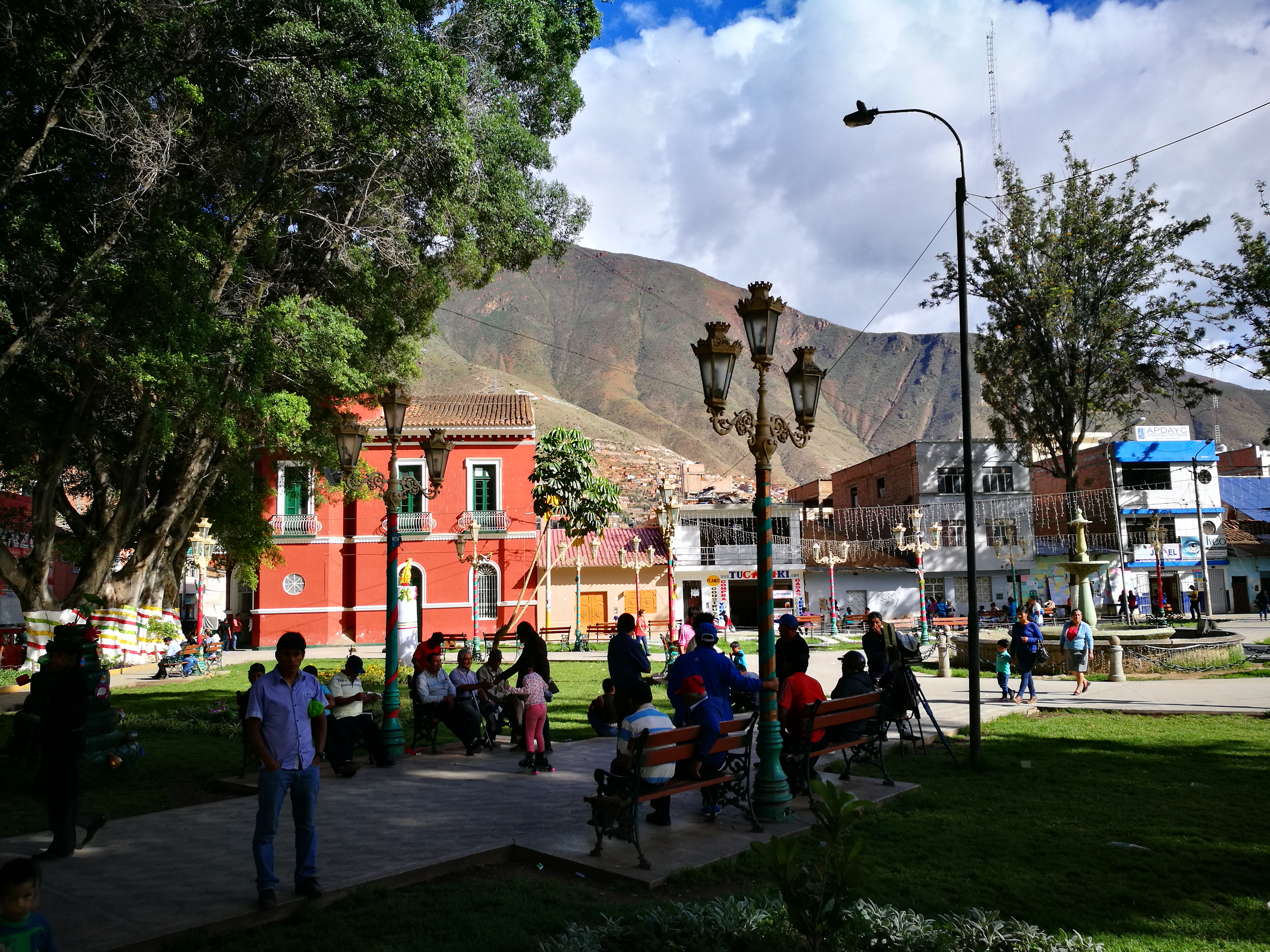
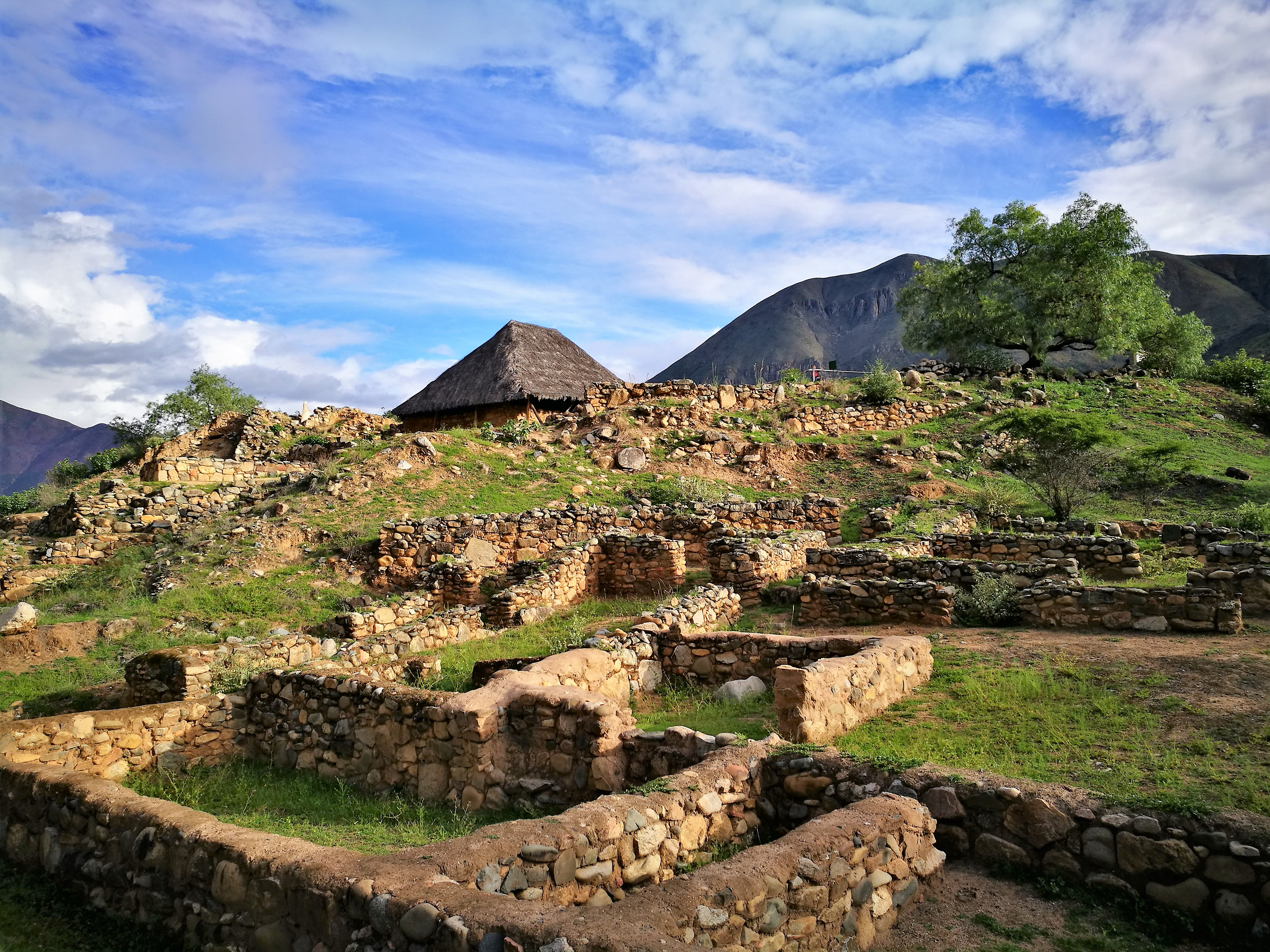
- San Sebastian Church and Park, Tingo Bridge, 28 July Merced Passage Huanuco Carthedral and Almas Square, Saint Domingo Park, Kotosh Ruin and Kotosh Temple of the Crossed Hands

- Flag Coat of arms

- Location within Peru
- Coordinates: 9°55′46.07″S 76°14′22.97″W
- Country: Peru
- Region: Huánuco
- Province: Huánuco
- Founded: 15 August 1539
- Founder: Gómez de Alvarado y Contreras

Government
  - Mayor: José Luis Villavicencio Guardia (2019-2022)
- Elevation: 1,880 m (6,170 ft)

Population (2017)
  - Total: 196,627
  - Estimate (2015): 175,068
- Demonym: huanuqueño/a
- Time zone: UTC-5 (PET)

Huánuco (Spanish pronunciation: [ˈwanuko]; Quechua: Wanuku) is a city in central Peru. It had a population of 196,627 as of 2017 and in 2015 it had a population of 175,068. It is the capital of the Huánuco Region and the Huánuco District. It is the seat of the diocese of Huánuco. The metropolitan city of Huanuco is 170,000 hab (2011, urban pop, INEI). It has three districts, Huanuco (head), Amarilis, and Pillco Marca. In this city, the Higueras river meets the Huallaga river, one of the largest rivers in the country.

== History ==
=== Colonial era ===
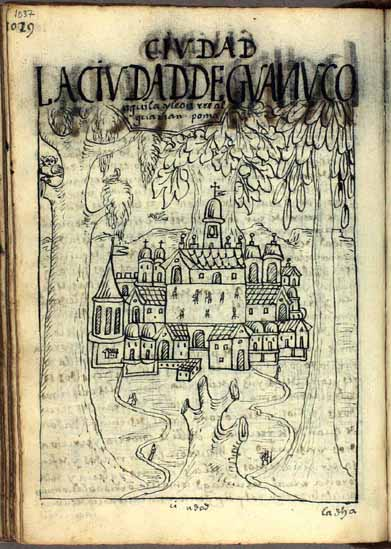
Huánuco in 1615 by the Inca painter Guamán Poma.

The city of Huánuco was founded by Spanish conquistador Gómez de Alvarado in 1539, in the Inca town of the Yarowilca clan, Wanako. In 1541, the city was moved to its current location in the Pillco Valley.

Gómez then set out on the mission, accompanied by many Almagrista soldiers. He arrived at the ancient city of Huánuco Pampa, where the remains of majestic Inca buildings still stand. There, he decided to establish a town, and the foundation took place on 15 August 1539. Its first mayors were Diego de Carvajal and Rodrigo Núñez de Prado. This foundation was made in the face of protests from the Lima City Council, which claimed that it would diminish its jurisdiction even further than it already had been with the recent creation of Huamanga. Pressured by Francisco Pizarro, he agreed to have its city title revoked, retaining only the title of town. Gómez de Alvarado then traveled to Lima, threatening not to return to Huánuco if it was not granted the title of city. His complaints must have been so intemperate that Pizarro considered it prudent to revoke his appointment as Lieutenant Governor, annulling at the same time the founding of Huánuco.

The indigenous chronicler Juan de Santa Cruz Pachacuti Yamqui Salcamaygua notes that during the Inca Empire, Pillco was a significant source of Aclla nuns for the capital city of Cusco, stating, "...there were maidens from all nations, especially from three, namely: Cusco and its territory, the Chachapoyas, and Pillco, which they now call Guánuco."

=== Republican era ===
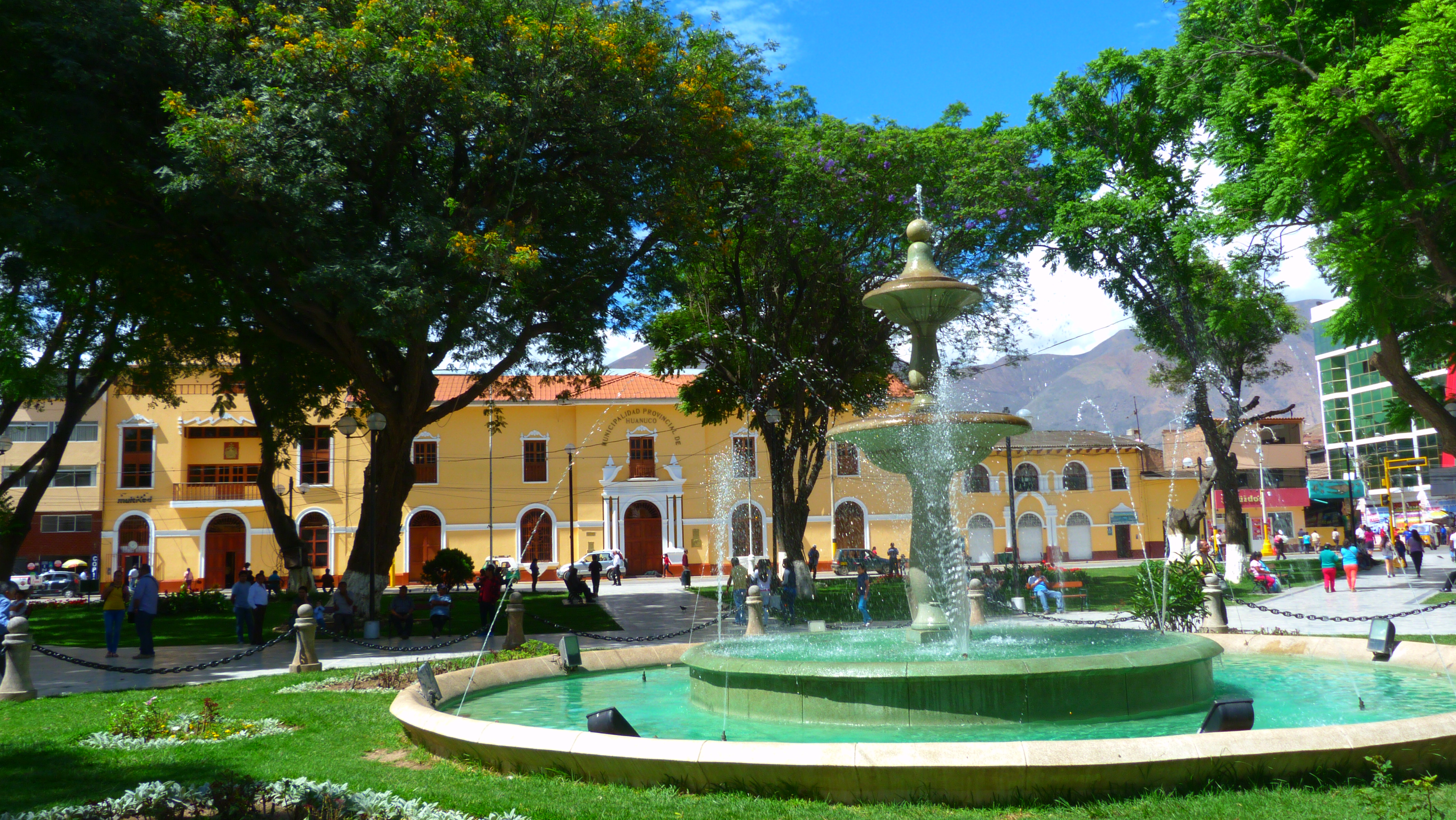
Plaza de Armas of Huánuco

Huánuco played an important role during the Peruvian War of Independence and the War of the Pacific. In Huánuco, multiple guerrilla and Montonero battalions were organized to fight the Chileans in the Breña Campaign. The most prominent of these guerrilla units was commanded by Colonel Leoncio Prado Gutiérrez.

As prefect of the department of Junín between 1846 and 1848, Mariano Eduardo de Rivero y Ustáriz converted the Colegio de Instrucción Científica into a mining school. It opened in July 1848 and was the first such school in Peru, though it lasted only a few years and its intended technical curriculum was never established.

Huánuco was the scene of one of the Chilean massacres during their occupation of Peruvian territory from 1881 to 1883.

In 2023, Huánuco became one of Peru's largest mining sectors, along with major economic growth. The mining industry grew by 350% that year, and the city and region became the third largest growing region in Peru behind Piura and Moquegua.

== Geography ==
=== Location ===
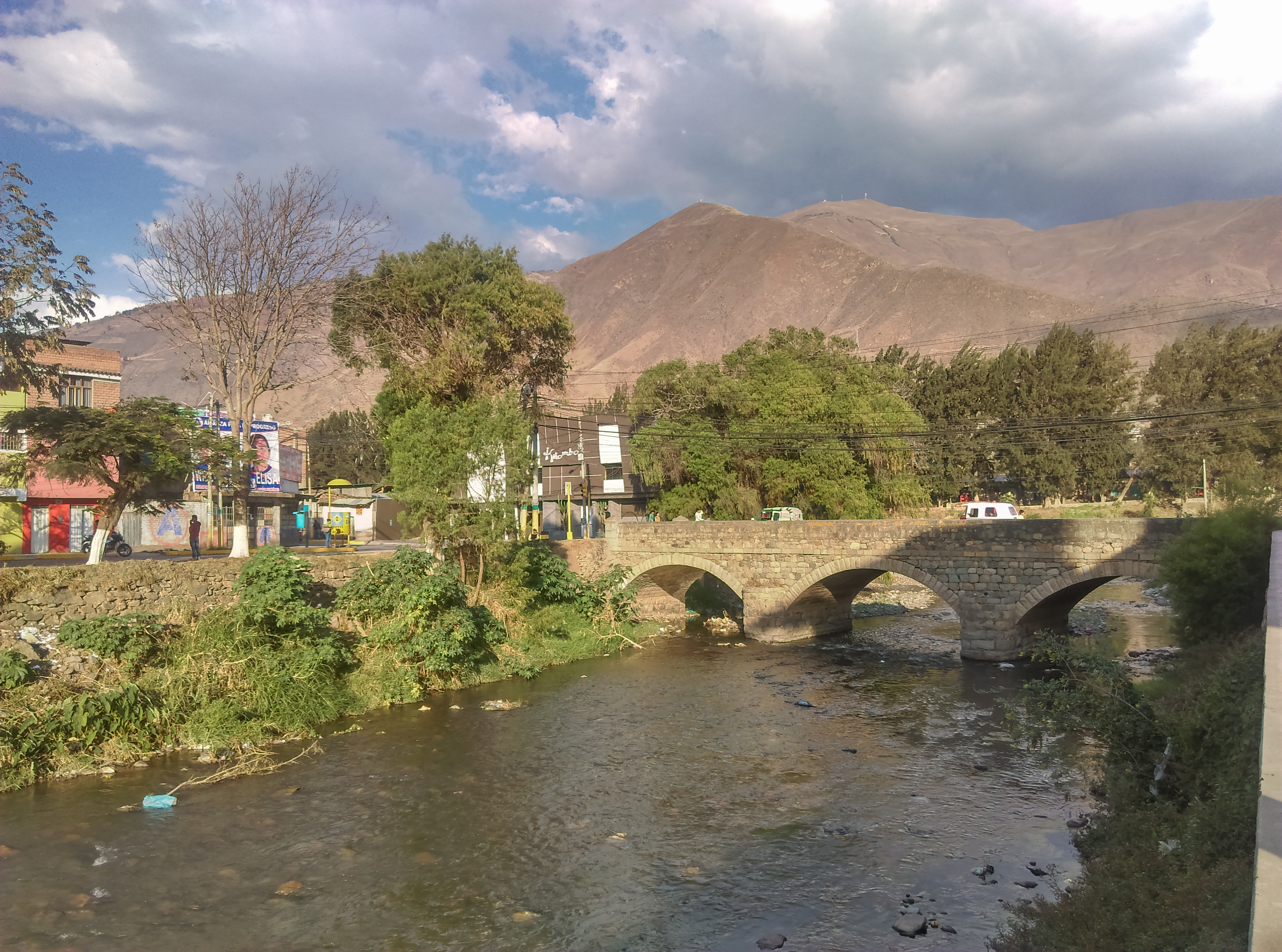
Puente Tingo

Huánuco is located at 1,894 meters above sea level in the valley formed by the Huallaga River. It is located in the temperate lands or Yungas of the eastern slopes of the central Andes.

=== Climate ===
Huánuco has a mild semi-arid climate (Köppen BSh). Its lowest temperatures are in winter, during the months of July and August (21 °C during the day, 17 °C at night) and the highest temperature is in spring, during the months of November and December (30 °C during the day). The imposing Huallaga River and the Higueras River cross the city. This climate, being dry and sunny, is beneficial for people who suffer from asthma. The temperatures are pleasant throughout the year with very warm days and comfortable nights due to its elevation of 1,913 metres or 6,276 feet.

Climate data for Huánuco, elevation 1,919 m (6,296 ft), (1991–2020)
| Month | Jan | Feb | Mar | Apr | May | Jun | Jul | Aug | Sep | Oct | Nov | Dec | Year |
|---|---|---|---|---|---|---|---|---|---|---|---|---|---|
| Mean daily maximum °C (°F) | 26.1 (79.0) | 26.0 (78.8) | 25.9 (78.6) | 26.8 (80.2) | 27.1 (80.8) | 26.5 (79.7) | 26.2 (79.2) | 26.7 (80.1) | 27.0 (80.6) | 27.0 (80.6) | 27.0 (80.6) | 26.2 (79.2) | 26.5 (79.8) |
| Daily mean °C (°F) | 20.7 (69.3) | 20.7 (69.3) | 20.6 (69.1) | 20.8 (69.4) | 20.5 (68.9) | 19.6 (67.3) | 19.0 (66.2) | 19.6 (67.3) | 20.5 (68.9) | 21.0 (69.8) | 21.3 (70.3) | 20.7 (69.3) | 20.4 (68.8) |
| Mean daily minimum °C (°F) | 15.3 (59.5) | 15.4 (59.7) | 15.2 (59.4) | 14.8 (58.6) | 13.9 (57.0) | 12.6 (54.7) | 11.7 (53.1) | 12.5 (54.5) | 13.9 (57.0) | 14.9 (58.8) | 15.6 (60.1) | 15.2 (59.4) | 14.3 (57.7) |
| Average precipitation mm (inches) | 53.1 (2.09) | 59.0 (2.32) | 76.9 (3.03) | 34.4 (1.35) | 11.7 (0.46) | 5.5 (0.22) | 4.1 (0.16) | 6.7 (0.26) | 12.9 (0.51) | 43.5 (1.71) | 50.0 (1.97) | 70.0 (2.76) | 427.8 (16.84) |
Source: National Meteorology and Hydrology Service of Peru

== Economy ==
Huánuco's main economic sector is agriculture, in addition to the food crops native to the mountains. Huánuco is a leading horticultural center (sweet potato, beans, celery, cabbage, potatoes, cassava, etc.) and fruit-growing region, producing avocado, mango, bananas, papaya, oranges, lucuma, custard apple, guava, and other fruit trees. Its warm valleys also produce coffee, pineapple, coca, and sugarcane. In livestock, crossbreeding zebu with native cows has yielded good results. Within the mining sector, Huánuco is an oil producer (Aguas Calientes) in the Pachitea River basin; and in the extractive industry, the timber industry stands out (Huánuco, Tingo María, and Puerto Inca). Commerce, an economic activity that also supports the department of Huánuco, cannot be overlooked.

== Sport ==
Association football is undoubtedly the most popular sport among the residents of Huánuco. The city's most popular clubs are Alianza Universidad who participate in the Peruvian Primera División, and León de Huánuco who participated in the Copa Perú. These two clubs traditionally compete in the Huánuco Classic. Other clubs include Construcción Civil and Cultural Tarapacá. The city's main stadium is Estadio Heraclio Tapia which has a capacity of 25,000.

Other popular sports in Huánuco include futsal, volleyball, handball, and basketball. The city has recently constructed the Estadio Olímpico Jorge Cabanillas Cabrera, a 11,000 seater stadium that forms part of a sports complex promoting sport in the city.

== Education ==
=== Schools ===
- C.S. Colegio de Ciencias
- CNA UNHEVAL
- G.U.E. Leoncio Prado
- C.S. San Luis Gonzaga

=== Universities ===
- Universidad Nacional "Hermilio Valdizán"
- Universidad Privada "Huánuco"

== Transportation ==
The city is served by the Alférez FAP David Figueroa Fernandini Airport, which provides regular flights to the capital Lima. One of the main highways of the country passes by Huanuco, connecting Lima-Callao with Tingo Maria and Pucallpa in the Peruvian Amazonia.

== Notable people ==
- Mariano Ignacio Prado - President and General, born in 1825.
- Leoncio Prado - Colonel and hero; fought in Cuba and against the Chilean invasion after The War of the Pacific.
- Daniel Alomía Robles - Musical composer and ethnologist born in 1871, famous for El Cóndor Pasa
- Johan Fano- Professional football player
- Beker Fabian - poet and writer
- Fey Silva Vidal - meteorologist

== See also ==
- Administrative divisions of Peru
- Killa Rumi
