= Algay (Chaulán) =

Mountain in the Andes in Peru

- Location within Peru

Highest point
- Elevation: 4,425 m (14,518 ft)
- Coordinates: 10°05′03″S 76°23′31″W

Geography
- Location: Huánuco Region, Huánuco Province, San Pedro de Chaulán District
- Parent range: Andes

Algay (possibly from Quechua for to cut halfway through, to interrupt; to fail,) is a mountain in the Andes of Peru which reaches a height of approximately 4,425 m (14,518 ft). It is located in the Huánuco Region, Huánuco Province, Chaulán District. It lies northeast of a lake and a mountain named Queuluacocha.
