= Wanakawri, Huánuco =

Archaeological site in Peru

Wanakawri
- Location: Peru
- Region: Huánuco Region, Huánuco Province

Site notes
- Height: 3,359 metres (11,020 ft)

Wanakawri (Quechua, Hispanicized and mixed spellings Huanacaure, Wanacaure) is an archaeological site in Peru. It is situated in the Huánuco Region, Huánuco Province, Chinchao District, southeast of San Pablo de Pillao, at a height of about 3,359 metres (11,020 ft).

== See also ==
- Aqumayu
- Qiwllaqucha
