= Fey Silva Vidal =

Peruvian meteorologist

Fey Yamina Silva Vidal
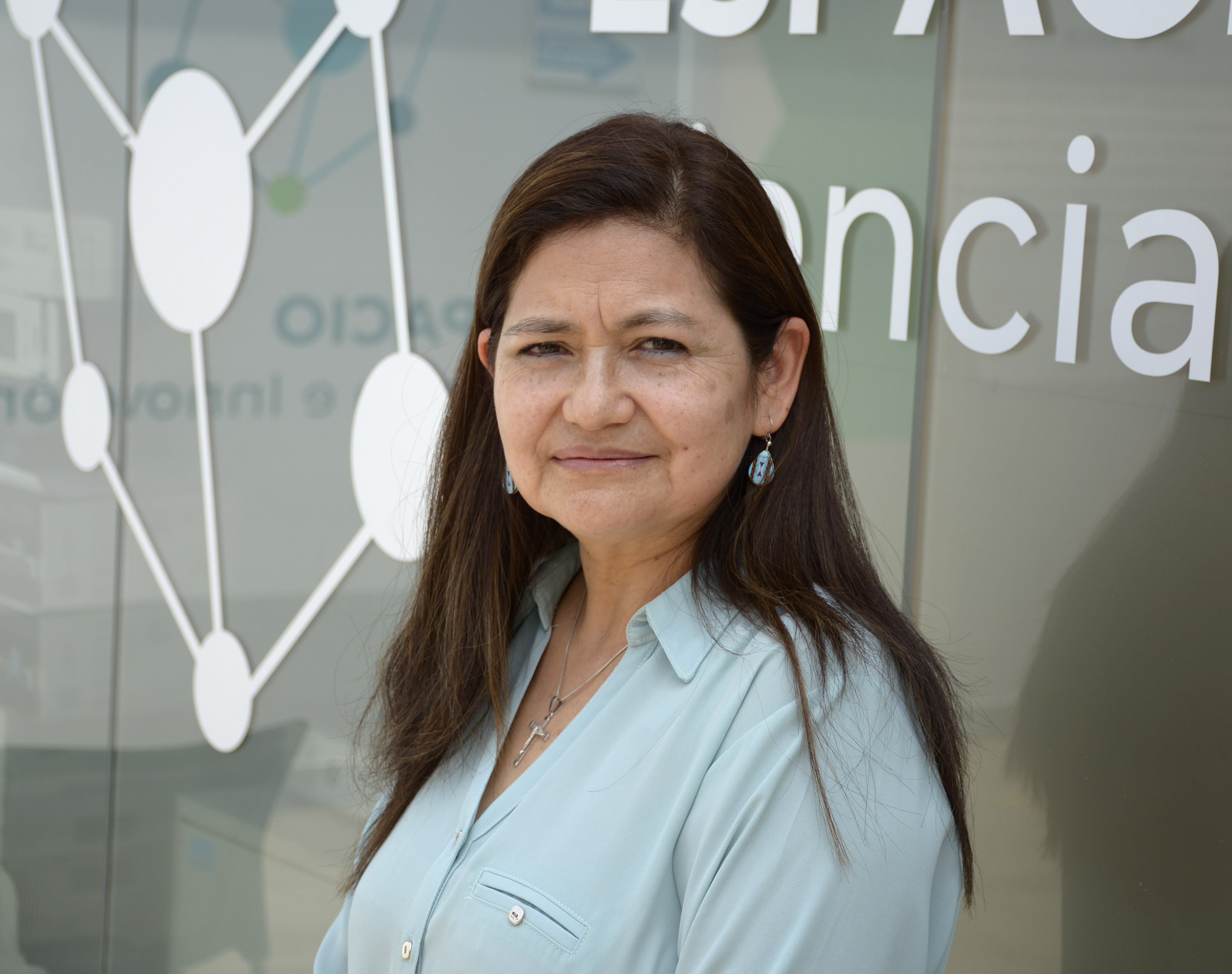
- Born: 1966 (age 59–60); Pashi, Monzón, Huamalíez, Huánuco
- Education: PhD in Physical-Mathematical Sciences at the Russian State University of Hydrometeorology
- Scientific career
- Workplaces: Vice Minister of Strategic Development of Natural Resources at the Ministry of Environment (2022–2023)

Fey Yamina Silva Vidal (born 1966 in Huánuco) is a Peruvian meteorologist and the first woman in Peru to earn a PhD in Physical-Mathematical Sciences. She has conducted pioneering research on climate variability and the El Niño phenomenon, contributing to advances in climate prediction and variability modelling, particularly in the Peruvian Andes. Her research has enhanced scientific understanding of atmospheric processes and provided critical data to support climate change adaptation efforts.

Silva Vidal has held several public positions, including serving as Vice Minister of Strategic Development of Natural Resources at the Ministry of Environment (Spanish: Ministerio del Ambiente, MINAM) in 2022, and as Director of the Geophysical Institute of Peru (Spanish: Instituto Geofísico del Perú, IGP). She currently works as a lead researcher at the IGP, where she directs a research initiative focused on understanding the physical, dynamic, and microphysical processes that drive climate variability in the Andes.

Her scientific contributions have been acknowledged by the National Council of Science, Technology, and Innovation (Spanish: Consejo Nacional de Ciencia, Tecnología e Innovación, CONCYTEC). Since 2022, she has been a member of the Pro-Women in Science, Technology, and Innovation (STI) Committee (Spanish: Comité Pro Mujer en CTI), serving as its president during the 2023–2024 term.

== Biography ==
=== Early life ===
At the age of 12, Silva Vidal's family relocated to Lima due to increasing violence and insecurity in the Monzón Valley, which had become a focal point of terrorist activity and drug trafficking. From an early age, she showed an interest in meteorological phenomena, particularly in understanding the impact of the El Niño phenomenon on Peru.

=== Education ===
After completing high school, she received a scholarship from the National Institute of Scholarships and Educational Credit (Spanish: Instituto Nacional de Becas y Crédito Educativo, INABEC) to pursue studies in meteorology at the Russian State Hydrometeorological University. She earned both a master's degree and a PhD in Physical-Mathematical Sciences, completing her doctorate in 1992. Her academic research focused on the physical and dynamic processes of the atmosphere, using meteorological models and radar systems to analyse the underlying causes of climate variability and extreme weather phenomena.

== Career ==
After spending 13 years abroad, Silva Vidal returned to Peru in 1998 as the country's first female meteorologist to hold a doctoral degree. She joined Dr. Pablo Lagos at the Geophysical Institute of Peru (IGP) to develop a predictive model for rainfall associated with the El Niño phenomenon, serving as principal scientific researcher. Since her return, she has continued her work at the IGP, focusing on the evaluation of atmospheric conditions in Peru, the analysis of El Niño events, and the study of climate variability in the Andes across multiple temporal scales.

Her research has encompassed climate variability, extreme meteorological events, climate change, and atmospheric numerical modelling, leading numerous studies in these areas. Since 2003, she has examined the effects of climate variability in the Peruvian Andes, with particular attention to the Mantaro River basin and its response to climate change. As part of these efforts, she founded the Atmospheric Microphysics and Radiation Laboratory (LAMAR) at the Huancayo Geophysical Observatory, strengthening regional capacity for studying atmospheric processes and their environmental implications.

In August 2021, Silva Vidal was appointed Head of the Decentralized Office of the Central Macro Region at the National Institute for Research on Glaciers and Mountain Ecosystems (Spanish: Instituto Nacional de Investigación en Glaciares y Ecosistemas de Montaña, INAIGEM). During her tenure, she conducted research on the impacts of climate variability and the retreat of Andean glaciers in Peru, with a particular emphasis on the interaction between atmospheric dynamics and the cryosphere.

From March to December 2022, she served as Vice Minister for Strategic Development of Natural Resources at the Ministry of the Environment (Spanish: Ministerio del Ambiente, MINAM). After concluding her tenure at MINAM, she resumed her position at the IGP as principal scientific researcher, a role she continues to hold.

Silva Vidal has over two decades of experience in academia as a university professor specialising in climate change and meteorology. Since 2021, she has lectured on climate change and risk management, and has contributed to the master's programme in Water at the Pontifical Catholic University of Peru.

== Research ==
Silva Vidal's research focuses on atmospheric and hydrospheric systems, with an emphasis on climate modelling, the projection of future climate scenarios, and the assessment of vulnerability and adaptive responses to climate change.

== Awards and recognitions ==
Silva Vidal was the first Peruvian meteorologist to earn a PhD in Physical-Mathematical Sciences, awarded by the Institute of Hydrometeorology of Russia. In 2021, the National Council for Science, Technology and Innovation (CONCYTEC) recognised her scientific career and included her in the publication Women Scientists of Peru: 24 Stories to Discover. She also served as president of the Pro-Women in Science, Technology and Innovation (STI) Committee during the 2023–2024 term.
