= Hatun Hirka (Huánuco) =

Mountain in Peru

- Location within Peru

Highest point
- Elevation: 3,937 m (12,917 ft)
- Coordinates: 9°45′32″S 76°17′08″W

Geography
- Location: Huánuco Region
- Parent range: Andes

Hatun Hirka (Quechua hatun big, hirka mountain, "big mountain", also spelled Jatun Jirca) is a 3,937-metre-high (12,917 ft) mountain in the Andes of Peru. It is located in the Huánuco Region, Huánuco Province, on the border of the districts of Churubamba and Santa María del Valle.
