= Amarilis District =

Coordinates: 9°56′30″S 76°14′25″W

Amarilis
- District
- Interactive map of Amarilis
- Country: Peru
- Region: Huánuco
- Province: Huánuco
- Founded: June 1, 1982
- Capital: Paucarbamba

Government
  - Mayor: Sergio Antonio Martinez Fernandez

Area
  - Total: 134.69 km^{2} (52.00 sq mi)
- Elevation: 1,910 m (6,270 ft)

Population (2005 census)
  - Total: 67,346
  - Density: 500.01/km^{2} (1,295.0/sq mi)
- Time zone: UTC-5 (PET)
- UBIGEO: 100102

Amarilis District is one of twelve districts of the province Huánuco in Peru.

== Climate ==
Climate data for Huanuco, Amarilis, elevation 1,919 m (6,296 ft), (1991–2020)
Month	Jan	Feb	Mar	Apr	May	Jun	Jul	Aug	Sep	Oct	Nov	Dec	Year
Mean daily maximum °C (°F)	26.1 (79.0)	26.0 (78.8)	25.9 (78.6)	26.8 (80.2)	27.1 (80.8)	26.5 (79.7)	26.2 (79.2)	26.7 (80.1)	27.0 (80.6)	27.0 (80.6)	27.0 (80.6)	26.2 (79.2)	26.5 (79.8)
Mean daily minimum °C (°F)	15.3 (59.5)	15.4 (59.7)	15.2 (59.4)	14.8 (58.6)	13.9 (57.0)	12.6 (54.7)	11.7 (53.1)	12.5 (54.5)	13.9 (57.0)	14.9 (58.8)	15.6 (60.1)	15.2 (59.4)	14.3 (57.7)
Average precipitation mm (inches)	53.1 (2.09)	59.0 (2.32)	76.9 (3.03)	34.4 (1.35)	11.7 (0.46)	5.5 (0.22)	4.1 (0.16)	6.7 (0.26)	12.9 (0.51)	43.5 (1.71)	50.0 (1.97)	70.0 (2.76)	427.8 (16.84)
Source: National Meteorology and Hydrology Service of Peru
