= Chinchao District =

Coordinates: 9°46′15″S 76°05′17″W

Chinchao
- District
- Interactive map of Chinchao
- Country: Peru
- Region: Huánuco
- Province: Huánuco
- Founded: January 2, 1857
- Capital: Acomayo, Huánuco

Government
  - Mayor: Juan Figueredo Rodriguez

Area
  - Total: 1,813.83 km^{2} (700.32 sq mi)
- Elevation: 2,110 m (6,920 ft)

Population (2005 census)
  - Total: 25,721
  - Density: 14.180/km^{2} (36.727/sq mi)
- Time zone: UTC-5 (PET)
- UBIGEO: 100103

Chinchao District is one of the twelve districts of the province Huánuco in Peru. Its seat is Acomayo.

== Climate ==
Climate data for Carpish, Chinchao, elevation 2,540 m (8,330 ft), (1991–2020)
Month	Jan	Feb	Mar	Apr	May	Jun	Jul	Aug	Sep	Oct	Nov	Dec	Year
Mean daily maximum °C (°F)	17.7 (63.9)	17.5 (63.5)	18.2 (64.8)	19.1 (66.4)	19.3 (66.7)	19.3 (66.7)	19.0 (66.2)	19.7 (67.5)	19.7 (67.5)	19.5 (67.1)	19.3 (66.7)	17.8 (64.0)	18.8 (65.9)
Mean daily minimum °C (°F)	11.1 (52.0)	11.2 (52.2)	11.2 (52.2)	11.2 (52.2)	10.7 (51.3)	10.1 (50.2)	9.5 (49.1)	9.8 (49.6)	10.4 (50.7)	11.0 (51.8)	11.4 (52.5)	11.3 (52.3)	10.7 (51.3)
Average precipitation mm (inches)	272.3 (10.72)	263.1 (10.36)	302.5 (11.91)	212.7 (8.37)	136.8 (5.39)	90.6 (3.57)	96.8 (3.81)	87.5 (3.44)	121.7 (4.79)	196.9 (7.75)	200.0 (7.87)	270.4 (10.65)	2,251.3 (88.63)
Source: National Meteorology and Hydrology Service of Peru

== See also ==
- Aqumayu
- Qiwllaqucha
- Wanakawri
