= Yarumayo District =

Coordinates: 9°55′45″S 76°30′00″W

Yarumayo Yarumayu
- District
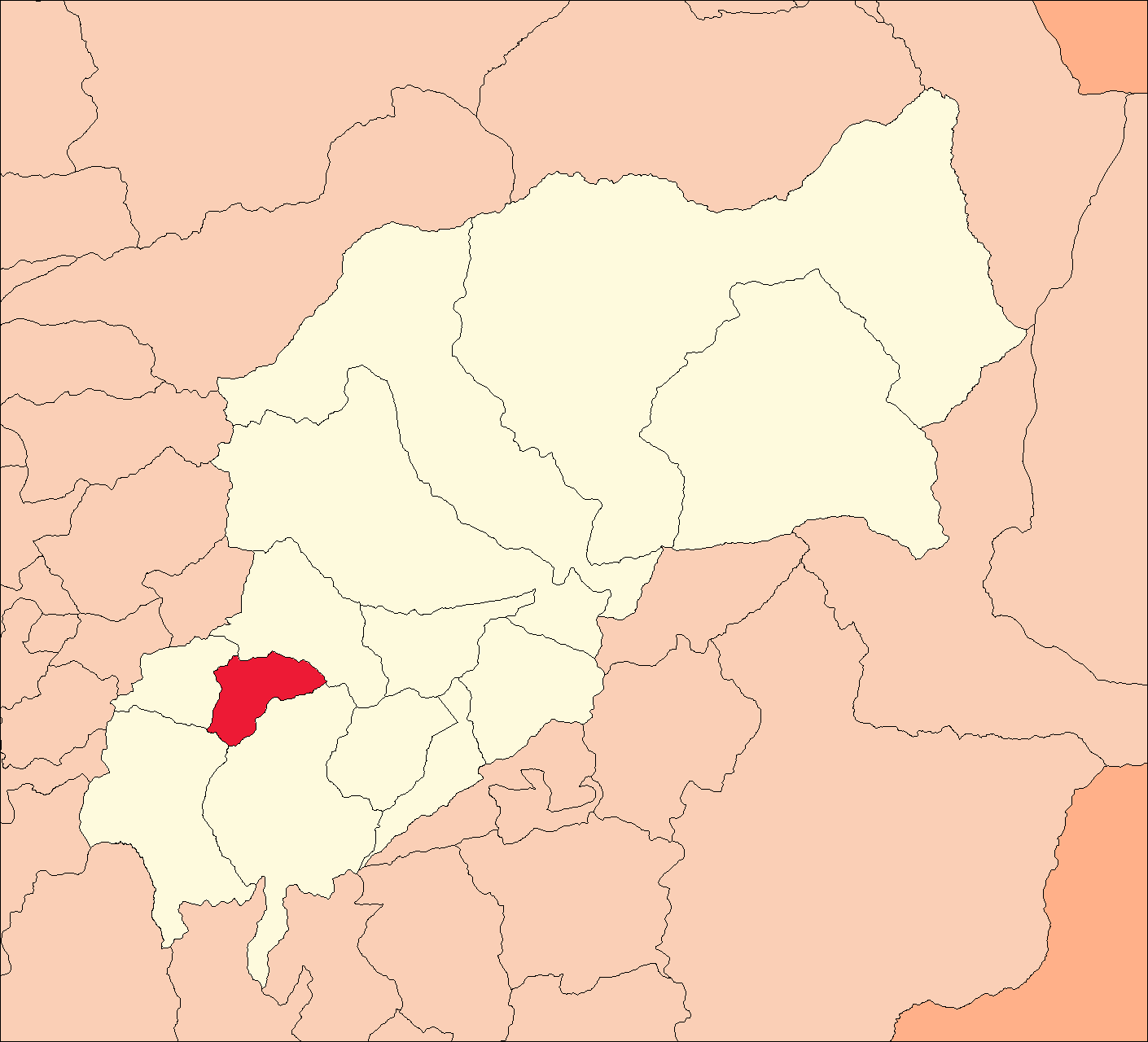
- Location of Yarumayo within Huánuco
- Interactive map of Yarumayo
- Country: Peru
- Region: Huánuco
- Province: Huánuco
- Founded: January 17, 1945
- Capital: Yarumayo

Government
  - Mayor: Efrain Montalvo Martin

Area
  - Total: 62.3 km^{2} (24.1 sq mi)
- Elevation: 3,000 m (9,800 ft)

Population (2005 census)
  - Total: 2,734
  - Density: 43.9/km^{2} (114/sq mi)
- Time zone: UTC-5 (PET)
- UBIGEO: 100110

Yarumayo District is one of twelve districts of the province Huánuco in Peru.
