= Yacus District =

Coordinates: 10.0128°S 76.4293°W

Yacus District Distrito de Yacus
- District
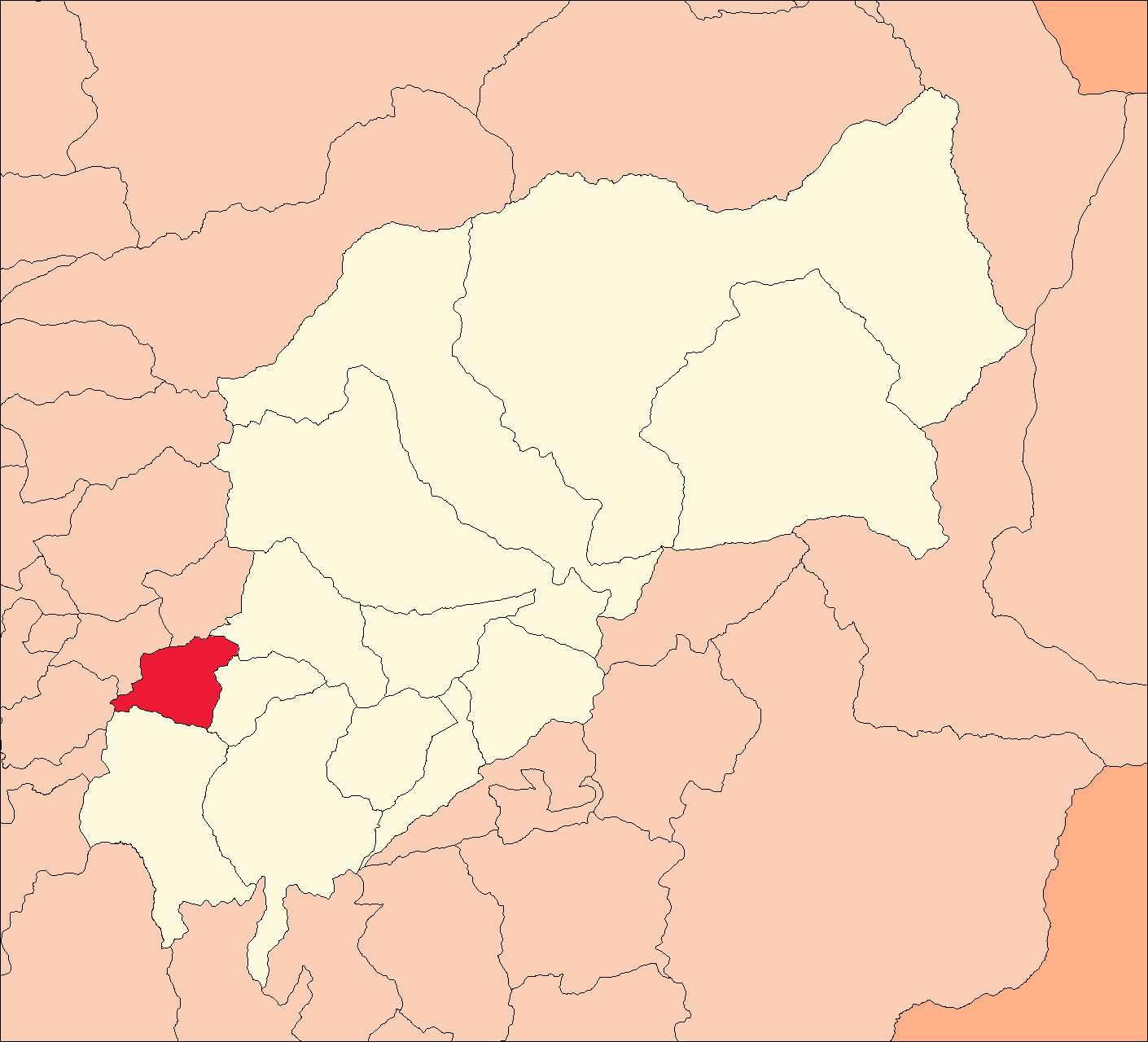
- Interactive map of Yacus District
- Country: Peru
- Region: Huánuco
- Province: Huánuco
- Founded: June 14, 2010

Government
  - Mayor: Simion Casimiro Castro Esteban
- Elevation: 1,894 m (6,214 ft)
- Time zone: UTC-5 (PET)
- UBIGEO: 100112

Yacus District is one of 12 districts of the province Huánuco in Peru.
