= Santa María del Valle District =

Coordinates: 9°51′45″S 76°09′00″W

Santa María del Valle
- District
- Interactive map of Santa María del Valle
- Country: Peru
- Region: Huánuco
- Province: Huánuco
- Capital: Santa María del Valle

Government
  - Mayor: Anibal Edmundo Solorzano Ponce

Area
  - Total: 481.9 km^{2} (186.1 sq mi)
- Elevation: 1,916 m (6,286 ft)

Population (2005 census)
  - Total: 18,918
  - Density: 39.26/km^{2} (101.7/sq mi)
- Time zone: UTC-5 (PET)
- UBIGEO: 100109

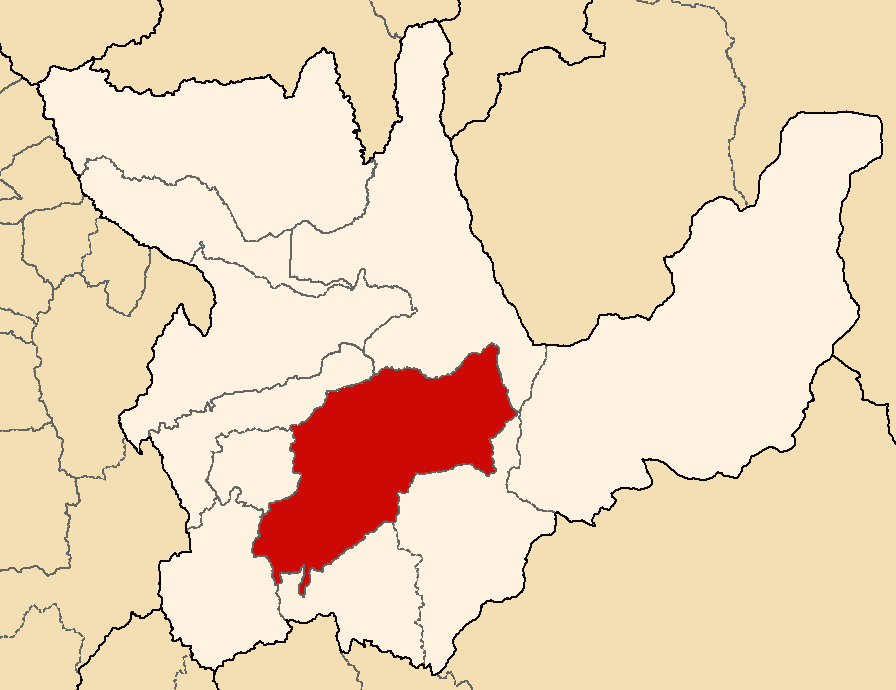

Santa María del Valle District is one of twelve districts of the province Huánuco in Peru.

== Ethnic groups ==
The people in the district are mainly indigenous citizens of Quechua descent. Quechua is the language which the majority of the population (63.16%) learnt to speak in childhood, 36.47% of the residents started speaking using the Spanish language (2007 Peru Census).

== See also ==
- Hatun Hirka
- Tuqtuqucha Punta
