= Munti Wasi =

Mountain in Peru

- Location within Peru

Highest point
- Elevation: 4,125 m (13,533 ft)
- Coordinates: 10°00′40″S 76°22′03″W

Geography
- Location: Huánuco Region, Huánuco Province
- Parent range: Andes

Munti Wasi (Ancash Quechua munti tree, Quechua wasi house, "tree house", also spelled Monte Huasi) is a 4,125-metre-high (13,533 ft) mountain in the Andes of Peru. It is located in the Huánuco Region, Huánuco Province, on the border of the districts of Cayrán and Chaulán. It lies northeast of the mountains named Qiwllaqucha and Yawarqucha.
