= Italian Union of Blind and Partially Sighted People =

Italian advocacy organization for the visually impaired

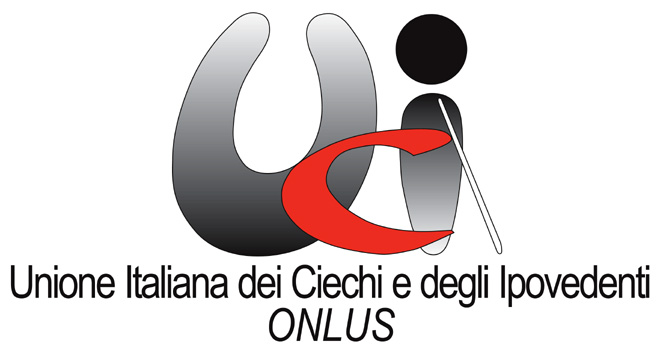
- Founded: October 26, 1920
- Type: Non-profit NGO
- Headquarters: Rome, Italy
- Location: Italy
- Services: Promote social integration of people with visual disabilities
- Key people: Mario Barbuto, President

The Italian Union of Blind and Partially Sighted People ONLUS (Italian: Unione Italiana dei Ciechi e Degli Ipovedenti), abbreviated UICI, is a non-profit organization with legal entity governed by private law. The Italian legislation bestows on the Italian Union of the Blind and Partially Sighted People the representation and protection of the moral and material interests of the visually impaired people towards public administrations and such responsibility is confirmed in its Constitution.
UICI is an association exclusively constituted by blind and Partially Sighted People. To join in the association indeed a visual acuity not exceeding 3/10 (considered with correction) is required. However, to achieve its goals, the Italian Union of the Blind and Partially Sighted People needs the support of sighted people who can work in it as employees or volunteers.

== Legal references ==
- Legal entity recognized with R.D. 1789 of 1923 and D.P.R. December 23, 1978 (G.U. 62 of 1979),
  under the vigilance of the Italian government (D.P.R. February 17, 1990 in G.U. 134 of 1990).
- Non-profit organization (D.L. 460 of 1997).
- Registered in 32/99 of the Register of legal entities in the Court of Rome.
- Association of social promotion, registered in National Register of social promotion associations (enrollment 383 of December 7, 2000)
- Fiscal code 80006990438.
- Certification UNI EN ISO 9001:2000.

== History ==
It was founded in Genoa on October 26, 1920, with the name Italian Union of Blind People by some militaries who lose their sight during World War I, amongst which Aurelio Nicolodi who became its first president.

By means of its representatives and many associated volunteers, UICI has led many political and social battles, by which blind and Partially Sighted People's fundamental rights are recognized, such as the right to education in ordinary schools, the right to work, the right to receive an allowance that varies according to the visual acuity of the person with visual impairment.

Through the years, UICI developed a variety of services, in order to meet the needs of blind and partially sighted people in relation to a constantly evolving society.

In 2007 its original name is changed to the current one, though the association was dealing since some decades now with the problems of the Partially Sighted People.

== Territorial organization ==
The intent of UICI is supplying a local high quality support to its members, by a net constituted by the provincial sections. The set of the provincial sections in a region constitutes the regional council, as the set of the regional councils constitutes the national council. In turn, the National Council is headed by the national leadership which is based in Rome.

== International representation ==
Internationally, UICI is a member of the European Blind Union (EBU) and of the World Blind Union (WBU).

== Operational tools ==
For the achievement of its purposes UICI has created services to make up for the lack of adequate social services
from the Italian State and other public entities.

=== National support ===
Specifically we should mention:

- the National Talking Book Centre;
- the National Technical Aids Centre;
- the Institute for Research Training and Rehabilitation (IRIFOR);
- the centre of studies and rehabilitation "Le Torri" in Tirrenia;
- the Italian National Union of Volunteers for the Blind People (UNIVOC);
- the Agency for the Promotion of Employment of Blind People (ALA);
- the Italian branch of the International Agency for prevention of blindness.

=== Local support ===
Local support to associated members consists in ordinary activities essentially concerning paperwork for the ascertainments of the disability and the subsequent grant of an allowance, informatic aids consulting, school integration in every phases and obligatory job placement.

Although every provincial section is part of a systema dictating strategies and methods of working, not all work the same way and obtain the same results. Success or failure of the work of a provincial section and of its closeness and availability towards its members depends essentially on:

- availability of volunteers (sighted or blind),
- availability of material and financial resources,
- commitment and professional preparation of the employees,
- attitude of the local society towards the partially Sighted people.
