= Machay =

Mountain in Peru

- Location within Peru

Highest point
- Elevation: 4,000 m (13,000 ft)
- Coordinates: 9°38′14″S 76°24′01″W

Geography
- Location: Huánuco Region
- Parent range: Andes

Machay (possibly from Quechua for cave) is a mountain in the Andes of Peru which reaches a height of approximately 4,000 m (13,000 ft). It is located in the Huánuco Region, Huánuco Province, Churubamba District.
