= Quillarumi =

Archaeological site in Peru

Killa Rumi
- Location within Peru
- 9°56′11.166″S 76°17′30.5376″W
- Type: rock paintings
- Location: Huánuco Region

Quillarumi (possibly from Quechua killa moon, rumi stone) is an archaeological site with rock paintings located west of the town of Huánuco, Peru. It lies on a slope of the mountain at an elevation of 2,463 metres (8,081 ft).
