= Sagrahuagra =

Mountain in Peru

- Location within Peru

Highest point
- Elevation: 4,200 m (13,800 ft)
- Coordinates: 9°39′30″S 76°22′53″W

Geography
- Location: Huánuco Region
- Parent range: Andes

Sagrahuagra (possibly from Quechua saqra malignant, pernicious, bad, bad tempered, wicked; restless; devil, synonym of supay, waqra horn, "devil's horn") is a mountain in the Andes of Peru which reaches a height of approximately 4,200 m (13,800 ft). It is located in the Huánuco Region, Huánuco Province, Churubamba District.
