= January 1971 =

Month of 1971

<<	January 1971					>>
Su	Mo	Tu	We	Th	Fr	Sa
					1	2
3	4	5	6	7	8	9
10	11	12	13	14	15	16
17	18	19	20	21	22	23
24	25	26	27	28	29	30
31

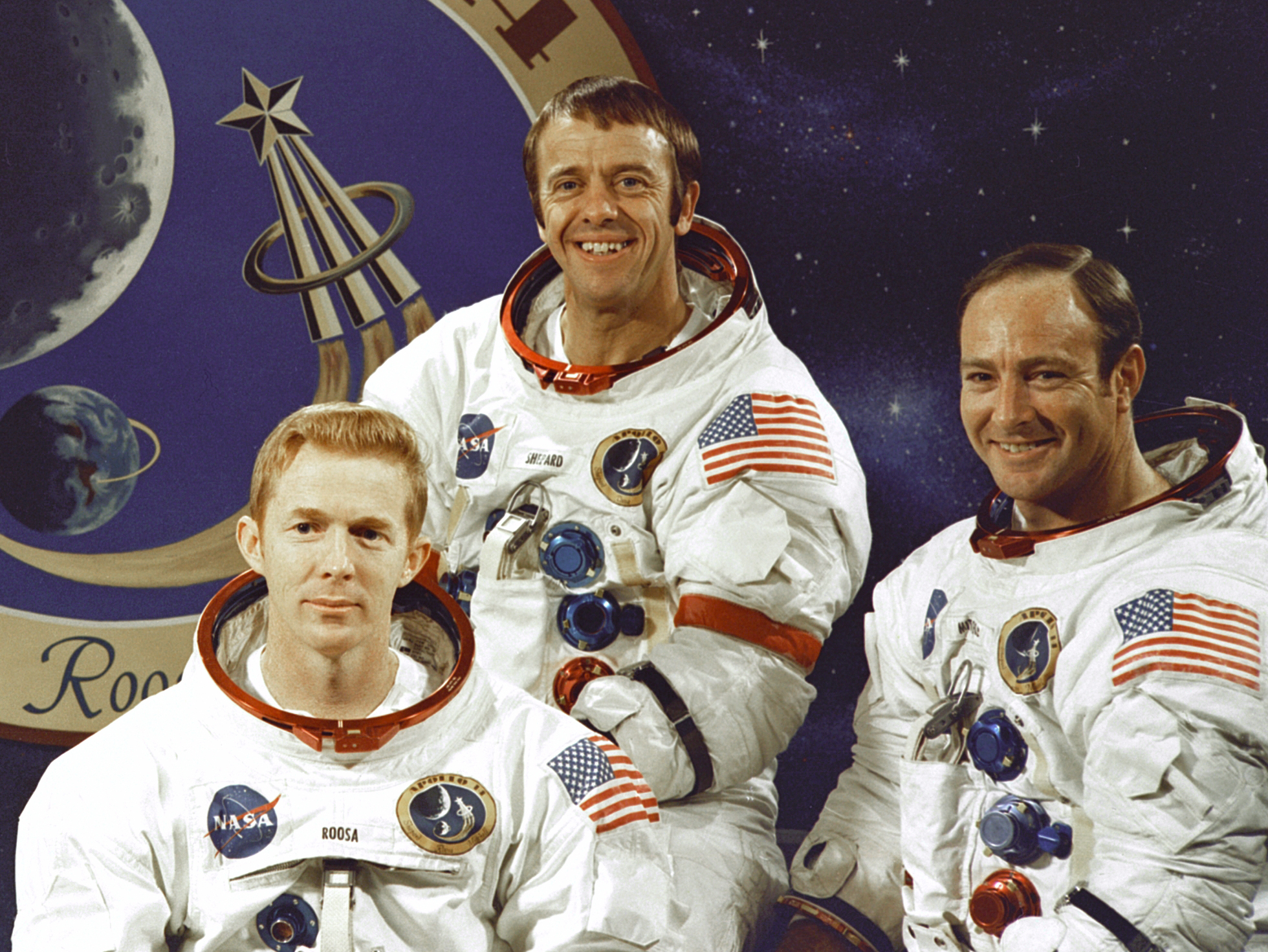
January 31, 1971: First American astronaut Alan Shepard (center) returns to space on Apollo 14

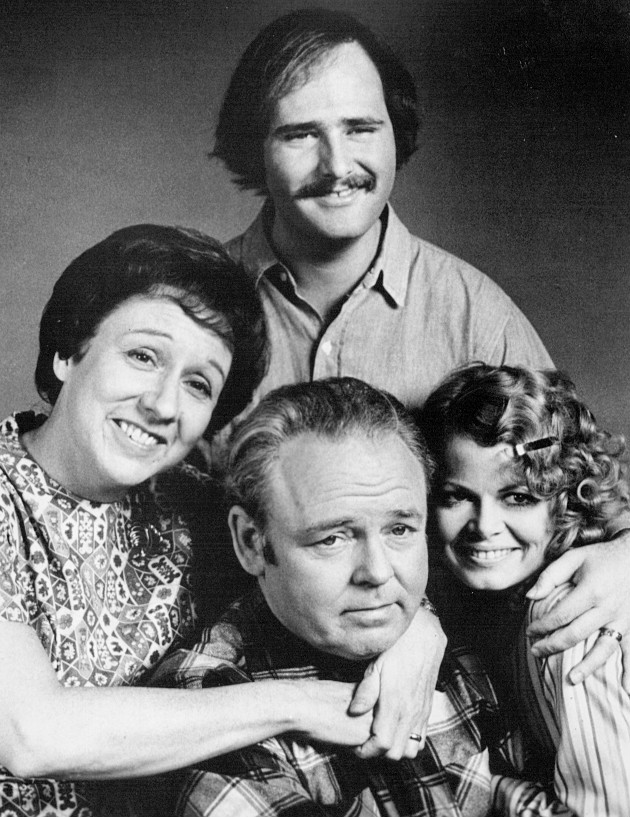
January 12, 1971: Groundbreaking sitcom All in the Family premieres

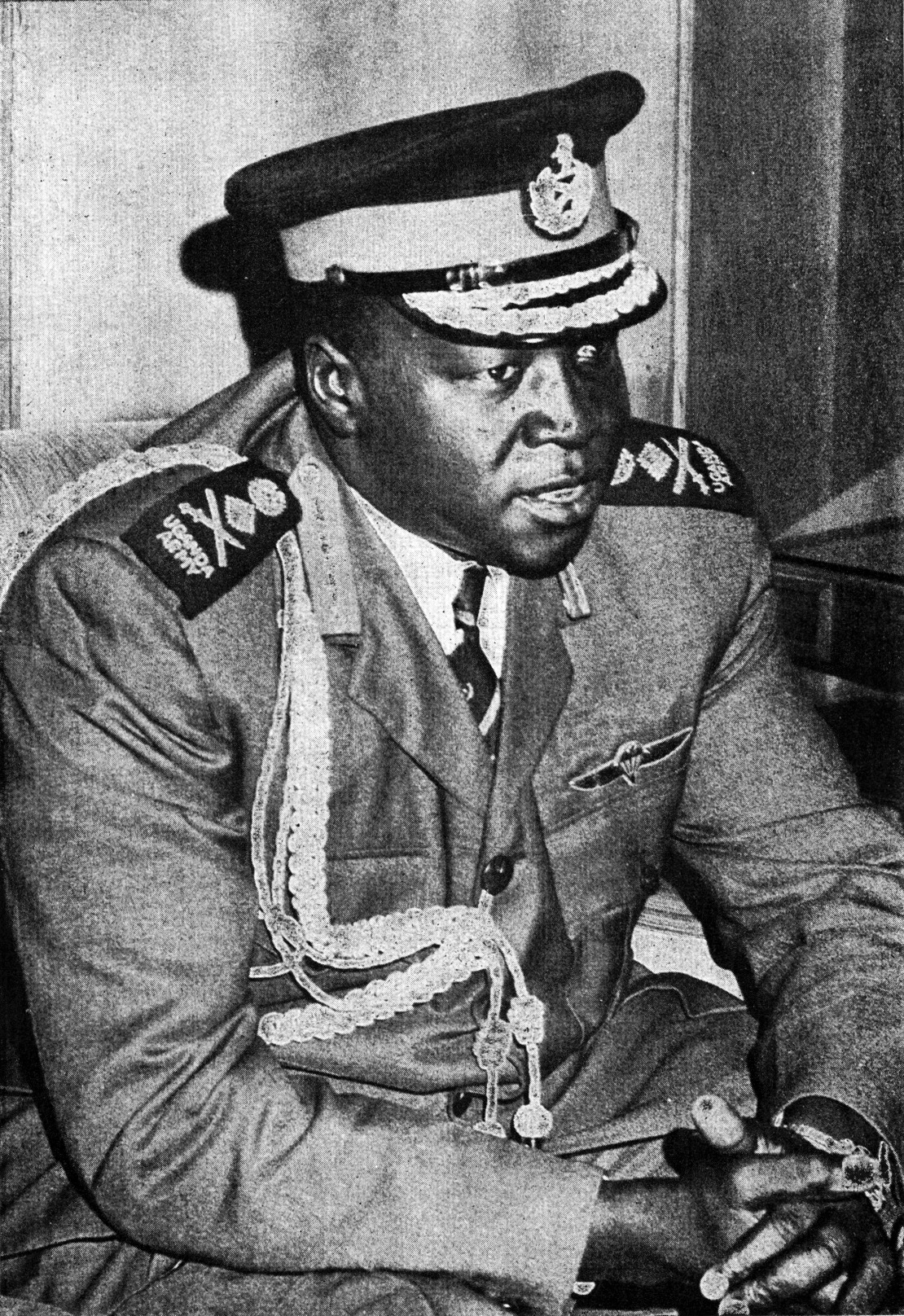
January 25, 1971: Idi Amin comes to power in Uganda

The following events occurred in January 1971:

== January 1, 1971 (Friday) ==
- The last cigarette commercials on U.S. television and radio were broadcast, and tobacco manufacturers spent US$1,250,000 for the farewell advertising prior to the ban that went into effect at midnight. The last commercial was a 60-second ad for Virginia Slims that was run by the Philip Morris company at 11:59 during a break on The Tonight Show on NBC. The company had bought the last pre-midnight ads on the late night talk shows of all three networks, with ads for Marlboro on CBS on The Merv Griffin Show and for Benson & Hedges on ABC on The Dick Cavett Show.
- The major bowl games of the 1970 college football season saw the No. 1 and No. 2 ranked teams defeated in the afternoon and in the evening, respectively. In Dallas, the Cotton Bowl was a rematch of the 1969 Cotton Bowl, when Notre Dame was upset by Texas. In the rematch, the #1-ranked Texas Longhorns lost to the #6 Fighting Irish of Notre Dame, 24 to 11. Notre Dame, whose shot at No. 1 had been dashed by the Longhorns the year before, snapped a streak of 30 consecutive Texas victories as future NFL great Joe Theismann ran for two touchdowns and passed for another. Later in the day, the second-ranked Ohio State Buckeyes lost to the No. 12–ranked Stanford Indians (now the Stanford Cardinals), losing 27 to 17 at the Rose Bowl in Pasadena. Thus, the No. 3–ranked Nebraska Cornhuskers, who had beaten the No. 5 LSU Tigers at the Orange Bowl in Miami after the Cotton Bowl and before the Rose Bowl, were the only major unbeaten team in the nation, with a final record of 11 wins, no losses and one tie. The Cornhuskers were voted No. 1 in the Associated Press poll of sportswriters on January 4. Texas is also noted as an NCAA 1970 college football champion for its 10–0–0 regular season record and its No. 1 ranking at season's end by United Press International's poll of college coaches; UPI did not do a postseason poll at the time.
- The International Investment Bank (IIB) began operations as a lending institution for members states of the Soviet Union's allies in Comecon, the Council for Mutual Economic Assistance.
- No-fault insurance went into effect within the United States for the first time, as an innovation in Massachusetts where the first law was enacted on August 13, 1970, "with the promise of lower rates for drivers, quicker settlements for those injured in accidents and much-needed relief for a court system swamped with litigation." Under the scheme, now universal in the U.S., a person's own insurance would pay for the initial medical expenses (up to $500) and damages for lost work for an injured person up to a limit (initially $2,000) and the carrier would then seek recovery from the insurance carrier of the driver at fault.
- Project VOLAR (an abbreviation for Volunteer Army) began as an experiment at Fort Benning, Fort Carson, and Fort Ord to improve conditions within the United States Army in order to encourage soldiers to enlist into military service. Among the experimental reforms were the abolition of KP duty (an abbreviation for "kitchen police" for cleaning and food preparation) and reveille. The VOLAR project would lead to reforms marketed as "The New Army".
- Fifth Street Women's Building Takeover: Shortly after midnight on January 1, a coalition of over 100 feminists illegally occupied an abandoned city building in New York City. They squatted in the building for 13 days, establishing a women's center with a homeless shelter, food co-operative, daycare, medical clinic, and lesbian center. Despite the group's cooperation with city authorities, 24 women were arrested 13 days into the occupation. It is considered one of the most important protests of the women's liberation movement.
- Born: Jarosław Wasik, Polish singer-songwriter, in Prudnik, Poland

== January 2, 1971 (Saturday) ==
- Sixty-six people were killed in Glasgow, and over 200 injured at Ibrox Park while leaving a soccer football match between Rangers and Celtic. Celtic had taken a 1 to 0 lead near the end of the match, and Rangers fans on the northeast stands were moving toward the exits when a goal was scored by Rangers to tie the match 1–1. Many of the fans tried to turn back around to return to the stands. As a police sergeant said afterward, "Then somebody fell. Somebody fell on top of him. And it snowballed until a crush barrier collapsed." Those killed ranged in age from 13 to 49.
- Dr Benjamin Sheares, a retired gynecologist, was sworn in as the second President of Singapore after being elected by the parliament to replace the late Yusof Ishak, who had died on November 23. During the interim between Ishak's death and Dr. Sheares's inauguration, a surgeon, Dr. Yeoh Ghim Seng, had served as the acting president.
- A group of Israeli anthropologists and doctors, led by Dr. Nicu Haas of the Hadassah Medical Center in Jerusalem, announced the discovery of "the first authenticated physical evidence of a crucifixion in Biblical times." The skeleton was of a man whose name, according to the inscription in Aramaic on his ossuary, was Jehohanan Ben-Hagkol, had apparently been between the age of 24 and 28, had been unearthed in June 1968 during the development of a government housing project in the Givat HaMivtar section of northeastern Jerusalem; of 35 individuals whose tombs were found underneath the grounds of the housing site, pathologists concluded that 30 had died from natural causes, two by fire, one from an arrow wound, one from a skull fracture, and one by crucifixion. Professor Yigal Yadin explained that the conclusion of crucifixion was supported by the discovery of a corroded iron nail in the heel bones of the victim, which the persons who buried Jehohanan had been unable to remove before burial because the nail had been bent after striking a knot in the wood of the cross.
- Born:
  - Renée Elise Goldsberry, American stage and television actress and 2016 Tony Award winner; in San Jose, California
  - Taye Diggs (Scott Leo Diggs), American stage, film and TV actor; in Newark, New Jersey)

== January 3, 1971 (Sunday) ==
- BBC Open University, allowing older, working students to obtain an undergraduate university degree through distance learning, began operations in the United Kingdom, with the broadcast of early morning television courses (on BBC-2) to supplement written and audio materials provided to the students. In the first year, 25,000 students applied for the program. The first bachelor's degrees would be awarded on January 11, 1973.
- American serial killer Carl "Charlie" Brandt, suspected in the murder of eight victims, took his first life at the age of 13 at his home in Fort Wayne, Indiana, killing his pregnant mother and wounding his father by shooting them at his home. Brandt, too young to be tried for murder, was released and moved to Florida where, on September 16, 2004, he would claim his final victims, his wife and their niece, before hanging himself.

== January 4, 1971 (Monday) ==
- The New York Daily Mirror, reviving the name of an unrelated daily paper that had ceased publishing in 1963, went on sale as a new tabloid published by Robert W. Farrell and was published Monday through Friday. On the same day journalists returned to work at London's more famous (and unrelated) Daily Mirror newspaper after a three-day protest strike. The tabloid would last less than 14 months, ceasing entirely after its February 29, 1972, issue.
- Carlos Camacho took office as the first elected Governor of Guam, after having been the last appointed governor of the U.S. territory.
- Philadelphia's "Black Mafia" gang committed the brutal robbery of the Dubrow Furniture store. Eight of its members entered the store at different times and then rounded up the employees after closing time and then began torturing them, shooting three people and setting fire to another in an attempt to burn down the building. The inexplicably sadistic crime later was dramatized in the novel The Witness, by W.E.B. Griffin.
- For the first time in 20 years, a passenger ship from a Communist nation was allowed to sail into the New York Harbor, as the Polish luxury liner Stefan Batory docked at Pier 40 at Houston Street. The International Longshoreman's Association refused to unload the ship because of a protest against Communism, and the passengers carried off their baggage without assistance.
- Born: Haytham Farouk, Egyptian footballer, in Alexandria

== January 5, 1971 (Tuesday) ==
- In the only known instance of the Harlem Globetrotters being defeated by the designated losers in their exhibition performances, the New Jersey Reds won, 100 to 99 at Martin, Tennessee. The last instance of a Globetrotters defeat before that had been in April, 1962, against a group of college all-stars in Denver. The Reds' owner and coach, Louis "Red" Klotz, told reporters later that his semipro team was under contract with the Harlem Globetrotters to appear at arena dates at a negotiated price for fees and expenses, and was not instructed to lose on purpose.
- "One Day International" (ODI) was introduced to the sport of cricket as an alternative to test cricket matches between national teams that were played over a four-day period. The format, approved as a separate category in 1975 by the International Cricket Council for the inauguration of the Cricket World Cup, was an unintended consequence of the and was an adaptation of limited overs cricket that had been created in India in 1951, and happened after heavy rains had stopped the third test cricket match of the 1970–71 Ashes series that had been scheduled for Melbourne Cricket Ground from December 31 to January 4 between England and Australia. The Australian team won by 5 wickets.
- Gunnar Jarring's mission to achieve a peaceful settlement of the conflict between Israel and its Arab neighbors resumed after initial failure.
- The body of Sonny Liston, the former heavyweight boxing champion of the world, was found dead in his Las Vegas home, after having last been heard from a week earlier. A coroner determined that Liston had probably died on December 30 after falling while alone. The date was arrived at based on the number of newspapers and milk that had been delivered to his home but not picked up.

== January 6, 1971 (Wednesday) ==
- In one of the few instances of a referee dying during a professional sporting event, Andy Hershock collapsed during an American Basketball Association game between the New York Nets and the visiting Memphis Pros. Hershock, who was only 43, went to the Memphis bench during a timeout in the first period, complaining that he was dizzy. When he attempted to return to the court, he collapsed and was pronounced dead 20 minutes later. The game resumed after a substitute referee was located, and the Nets finished with a 110–101 win. The ABA later staged a doubleheader with two games as a fundraiser for the Hershock family.
- A group of Canadian parents in Vancouver, who would be nicknamed the Militant Mothers of Raymur, began a successful campaign to stop the Canadian National Railroad from running its freight cars during the hours that about 400 children were walking to and from Admiral Seymour Elementary School in the Strathcona neighborhood. After the group halted a train, CN Rail and Burlington Northern officials promised to not send trains through the area at the times that children were crossing the tracks.
- The University of California Medical Center announced that a research team led by Dr. Choh Hao Li had made the first laboratory synthesis of the growth hormone (somatotropin, referred to in humans as HGH)
- Died: Jorge Barbosa, 68, Cape Verdean poet and writer

== January 7, 1971 (Thursday) ==
- In advance of the scheduled March 28 election permitted by the President of Honduras, Air Force General Oswaldo López Arellano, the conservative National Party (PNH) and the Liberal Party (PLH) signed a pact to run slates of 32 candidates apiece for the 64 member Honduran Congress.
- All nine crew were killed in the crash of a U.S. Air Force B-52 Stratofortress, the worst-ever domestic accident of an American B-52. The bomber was on a training mission when it plunged into Lake Michigan off of the coast of Charlevoix at about 6:25 in the evening. Parts of the aircraft were found in waters at a depth of 225 feet (69 m) four months later, but no remains of any of the nine officers aboard were located.
- Born: Jeremy Renner, American film actor best known for his portrayal of the superhero Hawkeye in five Marvel films; in Modesto, California

== January 8, 1971 (Friday) ==
- The French Line cruise ship SS Antilles, which had carried passengers on Caribbean tours since 1953, was irreparably damaged after her captain sailed into a narrow, shallow and reef-filled strait at Lansecoy Bay in the Grenadines set of islands. Striking a reef north of the island of Mustique, SS Antilles caught fire. All 690 of her passengers and crew were safely evacuated, but the ship could not be pulled free of the reef and was abandoned. It later broke in half and sank in the strait. Partially scrapped, the remains of the ship were towed to deeper waters and sunk.
- The New Andy Griffith Show, a situation comedy unrelated to the popular sitcom about the fictional town of Mayberry, premiered on CBS at 8:30 as comedian Andy Griffith's second attempt to reprise his earlier TV success. The new show appeared in the 8:30 Friday night time slot on CBS that had been filled the week before by Griffith's low-rated drama, Headmaster. After being "Andy Taylor" and "Andy Thompson", Griffith played the role of "Andy Sawyer", mayor of the fictional North Carolina city of "Greenwood". Despite guest appearances in the debut episode by Don Knotts and George Lindsey, viewership fell over the next few weeks and The New Andy Griffith Show was canceled after its 10th episode on March 12.
- Voyageurs National Park, Minnesota's first and only national park, was created by legislation signed into law by U.S. President Richard Nixon to set aside the 218,200 acres or 341 square miles (880 km^{2}) of land on the Kabetogama Peninsula. The park would open on April 8, 1975.
- The Tupamaros guerrilla group kidnapped Geoffrey Jackson, the British ambassador to Uruguay, in Montevideo. Jackson was being driven to the British Embassy when his limousine was rammed by a car. Five men then clubbed Jackson's two bodyguards, dragged his chauffeur from the vehicle, and drove away with him in the limo. He was held captive for eight months until September 9.
- Born: Jason Giambi, American baseball player who was the 2000 American League MVP; in West Covina, California

== January 9, 1971 (Saturday) ==
- American Airlines Flight 30, a Boeing 707, collided in midair with a small Cessna 150 plane that had flown into its path during its approach to the airport at Newark. The Cessna, with a flight instructor and a student pilot, took off from Newark at 4:10 in the afternoon and was over Edison, New Jersey when it struck the jet's left-side wing and knocked out its hydraulic system. The flight from San Francisco, with a crew of seven and only 14 passengers, made a routine landing, without declaring an emergency, after its crew lowered the landing gear manually. Both men on the Cessna, flight instructor William Squires and student pilot Edmund Ascolese, were killed when the plane crashed into a backyard at Jean Street in Edison.

== January 10, 1971 (Sunday) ==
- Masterpiece Theatre (now called Masterpiece), a drama anthology television series produced by WGBH Boston, premiered in the U.S. on the Public Broadcasting Service (PBS). The initial offering was a BBC drama, The First Churchills, introduced by series host Alistair Cooke.
- An attempt by the South Vietnamese Army (ARVN), to liberate 20 American prisoners of war believed to be held by the Viet Cong in Cambodia, sent 200 ARVN paratroopers from U.S. helicopter gun ships under the direction of Lieutenant General Do Cao Tri, but failed to find any POWs. The camp, located west of the Cambodian town of Mimot, was stormed without ARVN casualties and 30 enemy soldiers were captured.
- Died: Coco Chanel, 87, French fashion designer

== January 11, 1971 (Monday) ==
- The Peruvian freighter Paracas caused the deaths of at least 29 crew and the sinking of two vessels in the English Channel, after its captain travelled outside of standard shipping lanes in order to gain time. The freighter collided first with the oil tanker Texaco Caribbean, setting off an explosion that killed at least eight men and caused the tanker to break in half and sink. The next day, despite warning lights posted in the Channel, the West German fishing boat Brandenburg, collided with the wreckage of the Texaco Caribbean and sank quickly, killing 21 of the crew of 32.
- The Astrophysical Journal published the report of two previously undiscovered galaxies, now called Maffei 1 and Maffei 2 for the first astronomer to observe them, Paolo Maffei, both relatively near to the Milky Way, the Earth's galaxy. Astronomers at UC-Berkeley, Cal Tech and the Carnegie Institution reported in their announcement that the galaxies had gone unobserved from Earth because "they were obscured by a thick curtain of interstellar dust" within the Milky Way.
- The U.S. Navy relinquished control of the island of Culebra, part of the Commonwealth of Puerto Rico, after 18 months of lobbying by both of Puerto Rico's major political parties. The Navy agreed to surrender control to the 700 residents of the 11 sq mi (28 km^{2}) islet, located about 17 mi (27 km) from Puerto Rico itself. U.S. Secretary of the Navy John E. Chafee signed the agreement with Culebra's Mayor Ramon Feliciano and several other Puerto Rican officials.
- Uruguay's President Jorge Pacheco Areco demanded emergency police powers for 90 days to combat the Tupamaros and to hunt for kidnap victims; an 11-man commission representing the full Congress during its recess granted Pacheco the powers but reduced the duration to 40 days.
- Born: Mary J. Blige, American singer-songwriter, in Bronx, New York
- Died: I. Rice Pereira, 68, U.S. artist

== January 12, 1971 (Tuesday) ==
- The landmark television sitcom All in the Family premiered on CBS at 9:30 in the evening, opposite the ABC and NBC made-for-TV movies. Based on the British television comedy series Till Death Us Do Part), the TV series starred Carroll O'Connor as Archie Bunker, an openly-bigoted factory worker in Queens, with Jean Stapleton, Sally Struthers and Rob Reiner as his wife, daughter and son-in-law living in the same house. The critics' reactions varied; Cynthia Lowry of the Associated Press called it "a half hour of vulgarity and offensive dialogue" with "little humor and considerable embarrassment" and of The New York Times observed Archie Bunker's remarks and said "None of these is funny. They shock because one is not used to hearing them... They don't make one laugh so much as they force self-conscious, semi-amused gasps.". Clarence Petersen of the Chicago Tribune, however, said "Do not miss it. It's the boldest, brashest new series since Laugh-In made its debut... it is the substance, not the form, that will guarantee the show a place in television history.". Surprisingly, there was little protest over the show, with CBS affiliates in New York and Los Angeles getting less than 200 phone calls, split evenly between complaints and praise. The show was also the first to be videotaped in front of a live audience, as opposed to being filmed with a laugh track added in editing. Though not highly rated in its first season, the topical and controversial themes of the show drew notice and viewers tuned into the summer reruns of All in the Family. By the end of the 1971-72 season, it was the #1 most-watched show on American TV, with a 34.0 rating in its position at 8:00 on Saturday evening.
- Jimmy Carter was inaugurated as the 76th Governor of Georgia at the age of 46. A relatively obscure Georgia state senator and operator of a peanut-growing business, Carter failed in a 1966 bid for the Democratic party nomination for Governor, but succeeded in 1970. Slightly more than six years later, the obscure Governor Carter would become the 39th President of the United States.
- In the U.S., Congress passed legislation to prohibit the transportation and storage of specific chemical weapons (including nerve gas, mustard gas and Agent Orange defoliant) within the 50 states, moving many of them to overseas U.S. territories including the Johnston Atoll.
- The first classes were held for Criswell College, located in Dallas, with an enrollment of 329 students studying theology. The school, founded by Baptist pastor W.A. Criswell, was originally named Criswell Bible Institute.
- Born: Peter Madsen, Danish engineer, entrepreneur, and convicted murderer, in Kalundborg Municipality, Denmark

== January 13, 1971 (Wednesday) ==
- Colonel Edwin "Buzz" Aldrin, who had become the second man to walk on the Moon almost 18 months earlier on Apollo 11, announced that he was retiring from the space program and returning to active duty in the U.S. Air Force.
- Died: John Tovey, 85, Royal Navy Admiral of the Fleet in World War II.

== January 14, 1971 (Thursday) ==
- Brazil released 70 political prisoners shortly after midnight and flew them to Santiago, Chile, in order to secure the release of Switzerland's Ambassador to Brazil.
- The legislature of Haiti, acting at the request of the Caribbean nation's President-for-Life, Francois Duvalier, voted unanimously to amend the Haitian constitution to lower the minimum age for the presidency from age 40 to 20-years-old, and to permit the incumbent president to designate his successor. The moves were made to clear the way for the elder Duvalier to be succeeded by his son, Jean-Claude Duvalier.
- Cameroon's President Ahmadou Ahidjo rescinded the execution date for the Roman Catholic Bishop of Nkongsamba, Albert Ndongmo and those of two of his co-defendants. Ndongmo, convicted of conspiring in 1968 to overthrow Ahidjo, had his sentence commuted to life imprisonment. Ndongmo would be released in 1976 and allowed to leave the country.
- Nine senior citizens were killed, and 51 injured in a fire at the Westminster Terrace Presbyterian Home for Senior Citizens, a retirement home in Louisville, Kentucky. The dead, killed by smoke inhalation, ranged in age from 78 to 94.
- Alan Passaro, a member of the Hells Angels motorcycle club, was acquitted of murder charges in the December 6, 1969 killing of Meredith Hunter at the Altamont Free Concert. The jury concluded that Passaro, who had been one of several Hells Angels hired by the management of The Rolling Stones, had acted in self defense after Hunter had attempted to draw a revolver during Passaro's approach.
- Born: Lasse Kjus, Norwegian alpine skier, 1994 Winter Olympics gold medalist and three-time gold medalist at the skiing world championships; in Siggerud

== January 15, 1971 (Friday) ==
- The Aswan High Dam was dedicated in Egypt in ceremonies held by Egypt's President Anwar Sadat and by Nikolai Podgorny, the President of the Presidium and head of state of the Soviet Union, which had provided the primary financing for the one billion dollar hydroelectric project to dam the Nile River.
- Construction of the Cross Florida Barge Canal, intended to be an east–west ship canal across the Everglades of the U.S. state of Florida, was halted by a court-ordered injunction with the structure only one-third complete. U.S. District Judge Barrington Parker granted the request for a temporary halt, in a suit brought by the Environmental Defense Fund. First authorized in 1933, excavation had halted in 1936 but resumed in 1964 before the injunction was granted to prevent further destruction to the state's wetlands. U.S. President Nixon signed an executive order four days later suspending the work permanently because of its potential to destroy the Oklawaha River, which Nixon referred to as "a uniquely beautiful semi-tropical dream". Roughly $74,000,000 had already been spent on the canal, which would have run 107 miles (172 km) from Mayport in Jacksonville, to Yankeetown on the Gulf of Mexico.
- Born: Regina King, American TV and film actress and three-time Emmy Award winner and 2018 Academy Award winner for Best Supporting Actress; in Los Angeles
- Died:
  - Ernest Ouandié, 46, Cameroonian rebel, publicly executed by firing squad at Bafoussam.
  - John Dall, 50, American film actor, of a heart attack three months after being seriously injured in a fall while visiting London

== January 16, 1971 (Saturday) ==
- After 40 days as the hostage of kidnappers, Switzerland's Ambassador to Brazil, Giovanni Enrico Bucher, was freed two days after the Brazilian government had complied with the abductors' demands to release 70 political prisoners and to safely transport them out of the country. Bucher was driven to a street in the middle class Glória neighborhood in Rio de Janeiro and let go, and an embassy official picked him up. Bucher said that he had no idea where he had been held captive.
- The 1971 Five Nations Championship in rugby union began between England, France, Ireland, Scotland and Wales. In the opening games, Wales beat England, 22–6 at Cardiff, and France beat visiting Scotland, 13–8, at Colombes. Wales was the only team to win more than one game, winning all four of its matches during the round robin, ending with its 9–5 win at France on March 27.
- Died: Lothar Rendulic, 84, Austro-Hungarian and Austrian Army officer of Croatian origin who served as a German general during World War II

== January 17, 1971 (Sunday) ==
- The Baltimore Colts defeated the Dallas Cowboys 16–13, with a field goal in the last five seconds of Super Bowl V in Miami. The game was the first NFL championship to be played on artificial turf, and the first after NFL and AFL had merged into a single league.
- Novelist and nonfiction author Merle Miller became one of the first gay celebrities to "come out of the closet", publishing the article "What It Means to Be a Homosexual" in the New York Times Magazine section of the Sunday paper.
- Born:
  - Kid Rock, American country music singer and rapper, as Robert James Ritchie in Romeo, Michigan
  - Lil Jon, American rapper, as Jonathan Smith in Atlanta, Georgia

== January 18, 1971 (Monday) ==
- The Canadian content (CanCon) regulations went into effect in Canada requiring radio stations to devote 30% of the songs played each day to recordings by Canadian artists. The rules promulgated by the governing Canadian Radio and Television Commission (CRTC) enabled Canadian singers, songwriters and bands to get more notice in North America.
- The collision of two oil tankers in San Francisco Bay caused 800,000 US gallons (3,000,000 L; 670,000 imp gal) to be dumped into San Francisco Bay and the California coast, happening as two oil tanker ships collided. The Oregon Standard was carrying a shipment for the Standard Oil Company of California (now the Chevron Corporation) when its compartments were pierced by its sister ship, the Arizona Standard. The spill, worst in the history of the Bay Area to that time, also prompted the largest volunteer cleanup effort up to that time, with thousands of residents cleaning beaches and rescuing birds that had been soaked in oil.
- U.S. Senator George McGovern of South Dakota became the first person to announce his candidacy for the 1972 presidential election, a year ahead of the 1972 Democratic Party primaries. McGovern's announcement was the earliest declaration by a candidate in modern times up to that point. He would win the nomination, but would lose in a landslide to the Republican nominee, U.S. President Richard Nixon.
- Born:
  - Jonathan Davis, American singer, DJ, and musician, in Bakersfield, California
  - Pep Guardiola, Spanish soccer football manager and former player; in Santpedor, Catalonia
  - Junko Furuta, Japanese murder victim; in Misato, Saitama prefecture (d. 1989)

== January 19, 1971 (Tuesday) ==
- Representatives of 23 Western oil companies began negotiations with OPEC in Tehran to stabilize oil prices. The negotiations led to the six OPEC nations on the Persian Gulf (Iran, Iraq, Kuwait, Saudi Arabia, Bahrain and Abu Dhabi of the United Arab Emirates) acquiring control over the price of oil by using the threat of an embargo to the companies that didn't comply.
- U.S. Representative Carl Albert of Oklahoma was elected as the Speaker of the United States House of Representatives on the opening day of the 92nd Congress, succeeding Speaker John W. McCormack, who had retired upon the expiration of his term on January 3. After the nomination of Albert was approved by Democrats, 220 to 20, over the proposed candidacy of African-American Congressman John Conyers of Michigan, the vote for McCormack's successor, the vote went along party lines, with Democrat Albert receiving 250 votes and Republican U.S. Representative (and future U.S. president) Gerald Ford of Michigan receiving 176.
- Born: Shawn Wayans, American film and TV actor, writer and producer; in New York City

== January 20, 1971 (Wednesday) ==
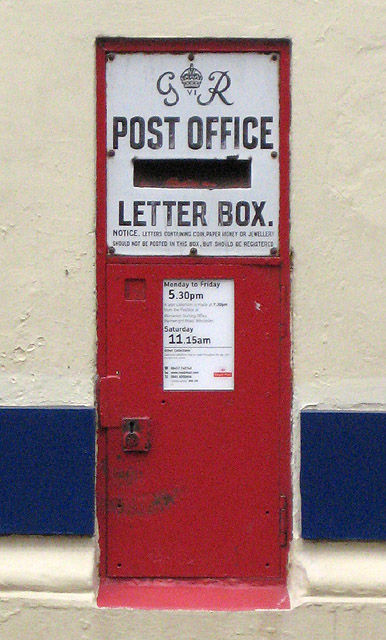
A Royal Mail letter box

- Employees of Britain's Royal Mail postal service went on strike throughout the United Kingdom, as letter carriers, mail sorters and counter clerks belonging to the Union of Post Office Workers walked off the job effective at 12:01. The strike would continue for seven weeks before it was settled.
- Born: Gary Barlow, English singer-songwriter, lead singer of Take That; in Frodsham, Cheshire
- Died: Antonio Bacci, 85, Italian Roman Catholic Cardinal known for his opposition to removing Latin from the Mass

== January 21, 1971 (Thursday) ==
- At the 25th convention of Japan's Liberal Democratic Party (the LDP or Jimintō), which had kept a majority in parliament for all but one year since its 1955 founding, delegates changed the party rules to effectively place term limits on the Prime Minister of Japan, a response to Prime Minister Eisaku Sato's selection in November to a fourth two-year term. In that the chairman of the majority party was Japan's premier, the new rule provided that the chairman could serve two three-year terms, but would require approval by a two-thirds majority of LDP members of each of the two houses of parliament. The rules change allowed for Kakuei Tanaka to be selected as the new chairman and prime minister a few months before the 1972 parliamentary elections. The LDP would later rescind the limit, allowing the current Prime Minister, Shinzō Abe, to be re-elected to multiple terms starting in 2012.
- Born: Thomas Rehak, Liechtenstein politician and leader of the opposition Demokraten pro Liechtenstein (DpL) since 2018.
- Died:
  - Leonard I. Schiff, 55, American physicist, died from a heart attack.
  - Arthur Batten-Pooll, 79, English Victoria Cross recipient for actions in World War One.

== January 22, 1971 (Friday) ==
- U.S. President Nixon announced his plans for a massive reorganization of the executive branch of the U.S. government, describing his proposal in the annual State of the Union Address to a joint session of Congress. Under Nixon's proposal, the U.S. Departments of Commerce, Agriculture, Commerce and Transportation would be merged into a "Department of Economic Development", while a "Department of Natural Resources", a "Department of Community Development" and a "Department of Human Resources" would take over the functions of several independent agencies and the Departments of the Interior, Housing and Urban Development (HUD) and Health, Education and Welfare (HEW, now the HHS and the Department of Education) respectively.
- The Singapore Declaration was issued at the conclusion of the first Commonwealth Heads of Government Meeting (CHOGM).
- Phnom Penh, the capital of the Khmer Republic (formerly Cambodia) was hit by a surprise attack by the Communist Khmer Rouge guerrillas, starting with a simultaneous assault on the international airport by ground troops, and the firing of mortar shells and rockets into the heart of the city. The attack on the airport, carried out by a 10-member guerrilla team, killed 26 civilians and 13 soldiers, and injured 170 people.
- Northwest Orient Airlines Flight 433, traveling from Milwaukee to Washington, D.C., with 59 people aboard, was hijacked by a Milwaukee resident and member of the Black Panthers, Garland Grant. The hijacker wanted to go to Algeria, but settled for going to Cuba. After Flight 433 landed in Havana, the passengers and crew were released, but Grant was arrested and jailed for more than five years in a Cuban prison, and lost an eye after being beaten by prison guards. Set free in 1976, he would tell a reporter later that he was given a job sweeping floors in a Havana hotel. Released a year later from Cuba, Grant would be jailed in the U.S. until 1990.
- Died: Harry F. Guggenheim, 80, American businessman, diplomat, publisher, philanthropist, and horseman

== January 23, 1971 (Saturday) ==
- The lowest temperature in United States history up to the present, −79.8 °F (−62.1 °C), was recorded at the weather station in Prospect Creek, Alaska, above the Arctic Circle, breaking the previous U.S. record set at a station at Rogers Pass, Montana of −70 °F (−57 °C) set on January 20, 1954, before Alaska was a U.S. state.
- After strikers in Poland demanded the resignation of Interior Minister Kazimierz Świtała for ordering the nation's security police (the Sluzba Berzpieczenstwa or SB) to shoot at rioters a month earlier, Świtała was removed from office. As was common in Communist nations at the time, Świtała was reported by the state news agency as having "resigned for reasons of health". Świtała was replaced by Franciszek Szlachcic.

== January 24, 1971 (Sunday) ==
- The anti-rape movement in the United States, an effort to raise awareness of the problem and to reform police policy toward the victims, held its first major event as the New York Radical Feminists held the Speak-Out at St. Clement's Episcopal Church in New York.
- The Supreme Revolutionary Tribunal, the governing body of Guinea sentenced to death 92 Guineans who helped Portuguese troops in the failed landing attempts in November 1970. The first 58 were hanged in a public execution the next day, including six former government officials. Another 72 were sentenced to hard labor for life, including Raymond-Marie Tchidimbo, the Roman Catholic Archbishop of Conakry, among those arrested as part of the Christmas Eve purge by Touré of personal enemies. Archbishop Tchidimbo would be imprisoned at Camp Boiro for almost nine years before being freed on August 7, 1979, as part of an agreement between the Vatican and Guinea.
- Minutes after the end of the first AFC-NFC Pro Bowl game for NFL all-stars, Oakland Raiders receiver Warren Wells was met by Los Angeles Police Department officers in the L.A. Coliseum locker room and placed under arrest. Wells had played in the game for the AFC team, but was on probation after a 1969 conviction for aggravated assault, was picked up for violating the terms of his release by drinking in a bar during the 1970 NFL season. Denied bail, he was booked at the Parker Center and then placed in jail. The arrest ended the football career of Wells.
- Died:
  - Bill W., 75, U.S. co-founder, in 1935, of Alcoholics Anonymous. In the announcement of his death, his name was finally revealed to the public as William Griffith Wilson, a retired Wall Street securities analyst who had had "a dramatic spiritual experience" in 1935 to recover from alcoholism and to stay sober.
  - Martha Baird Rockefeller, 75, American concert pianist, widow of John D. Rockefeller Jr. and philanthropist who endowed a large portion of a $48,000,000 inheritance to supporting the arts.

== January 25, 1971 (Monday) ==
- A coup d'état in Uganda, led by General Idi Amin Dada, toppled the government of President Milton Obote. General Amin had been commander in chief of the Ugandan Armed Forces until 1970, when President Obote appointed himself to the position and reduced Amin's responsibilities to commander in chief of the Ugandan Army. Amin learned that Obote was planning to have him arrested for embezzlement of Army funds, and organized the coup while Obote was out of the country attending the British Commonwealth summit in Singapore.

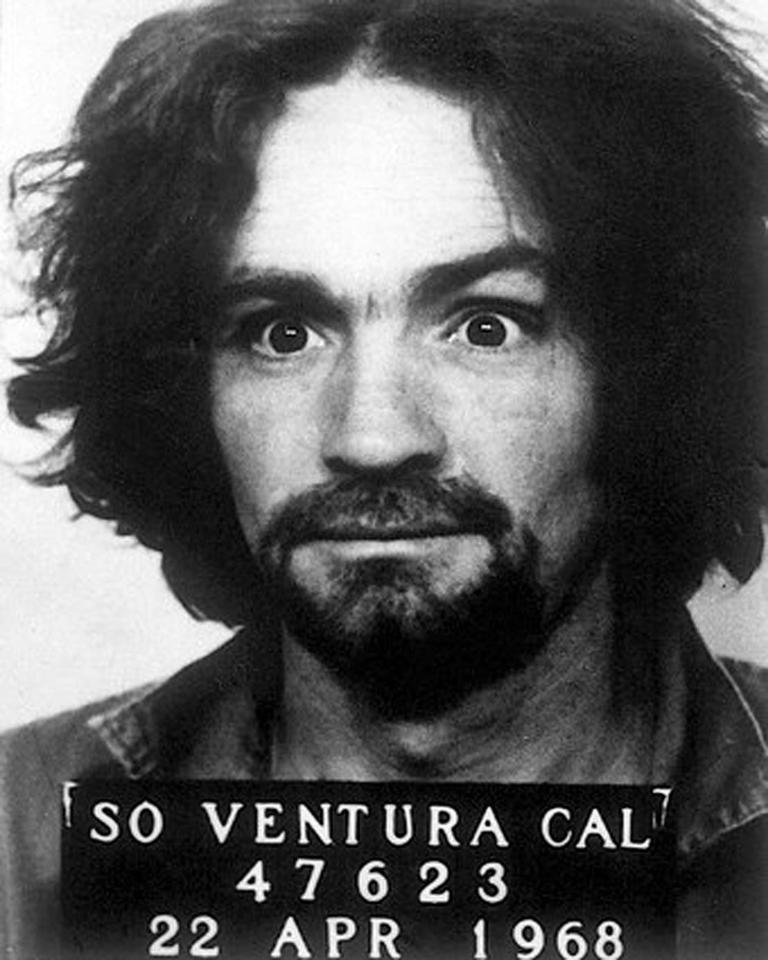
Convicted murderer Manson

- The murder trial of serial killer Charles Manson and three of his "Manson Family" followers ended with the jury returning guilty verdicts against all four. Manson, Patricia Krenwinkel and Susan Atkins were convicted of seven counts of first degree murder in the Tate–LaBianca murders of August 9 and 10, 1969, and Leslie Van Houten was found guilty of the five murders committed on August 9.
- The day before it was to be "topped out" (the placement of the very last beam of a structure under construction), the planned 2000 Commonwealth Avenue luxury condominium building collapsed, destroying the 15-story building. The disaster happened as workers were pouring the concrete on the top floor of the building, located in the Brighton neighborhood of Boston. Despite the height of the building, only four construction workers were killed, all in the basement garage. Another 30 workers were injured.
- Himachal Pradesh became the 18th of the states of India.
- The boyhood home of the late U.S. President Dwight D. Eisenhower, located at 201 Southeast 4th Street in Abilene, Kansas, was placed on the National Register of Historic Places by the U.S. government.
- Intelsat IV F-2, part of the eight geostationary communications satellites in the new Intelsat generation, was launched into orbit from Cape Kennedy. It entered commercial service over the Atlantic Ocean on March 26.
- Born: China Kantner, American actress and songwriter, and daughter of two founding members of the Jefferson Airplane rock group, singer Grace Slick and guitarist Paul Kantner; in San Francisco
- Died:
  - Ibrahima Barry, 47, Guinean politician nicknamed "Barry III", executed by hanging at the Tombo Bridge in Conakry for his involvement following the failure of the November attempt to overthrow the government of President Ahmed Sékou Touré
  - General Hermann Hoth, 85, German war criminal and officer known for carrying out the Commissar Order of 1941

== January 26, 1971 (Tuesday) ==
- On Australia Day, a flash flood in the Canberra and the Australian Capital Territory (A.C.T.) killed seven people, including four children ranging in age from 8 to 14), injured another 15 and affected 500 people altogether.

== January 27, 1971 (Wednesday) ==
- Meeting in Washington, D.C., the National Religious Broadcasters association of evangelists celebrated the 50th anniversary of the religious first radio broadcast (made January 2, 1921) by staging the first international religious broadcast to be transmitted around the world by satellite, a literal implementation of the admonition to "Go ye into all the world, and preach the gospel to every creature." A reporter noted that "The broadcast over Intelsat facilities was the most dramatic event in a quiet explosion taking place on the nation's airwaves," the trend of religious broadcasters to purchase radio time.
- Died: Jacobo Árbenz Guzmán, 57, former President of Guatemala who was overthrown in 1954 in a coup sponsored by the American CIA. Árbenz was found dead in his bathtub at his home in Mexico City; cause of death may have been accidental, suicide or a heart attack.

== January 28, 1971 (Thursday) ==
- Alwatan made its debut as the first newspaper of the Sultanate of Oman, which had previously relied on Arabic-language publications from neighboring nations.
- The strict "Comics Code" of the Comics Code Authority was revised for the first time since its promulgation in 1954, with the ease of restrictions on certain prohibitions, with the new provisions to take effect on February 1. The meeting was held in New York between the representatives of the five major comic book publishers at the time, National Publications (which marketed DC Comics), Marvel Comics, Harvey Comics, Archie Comics and Charlton Comics. The revision allowed for depictions of horror fiction characters that had a background in classical literature, permitting "vampires, ghouls and werewolves... when handled in the classic tradition."
- John J. Pershing College of Beatrice, Nebraska abruptly informed its students that the college was closing permanently at noon, five days before the second semester of the 1970–1971 school year was to start. The college had been founded in 1966 with the mission of providing a "second chance for students in academic trouble elsewhere" but had been steadily losing money, dropping from a peak of 570 students to 385 when the trustees voted to end its existence.
- At approximately 4:30 p.m. PST, a bomb exploded in Los Angeles in the second-floor men's restroom of the 300 North Los Angeles Street Federal Building, killing 18-year-old Tomas "Tommy" Ortiz, a part-time IRS mail orderly and student.
- Born: Mickalene Thomas, African-American artist; in Camden, New Jersey
- Died: Samuel Gottscho, 95, American photographer

== January 29, 1971 (Friday) ==
- Court-martial charges arising from the My Lai massacre against U.S. Army Major General Samuel W. Koster, who had been accused of attempting to cover up the March 16, 1968 mass killings of South Vietnamese civilians, were dropped by the commanding general of the U.S. First Army. Major General Koster, a former superintendent of the U.S. Military Academy at West Point, had been the division commander of the 23rd Infantry Division, whose soldiers had been implicated in the killing.
- The last of its many UFO sightings was made in the Finland city of Pudasjärvi.
- Born: Clare Balding, English jockey, sports broadcaster and president of England's Rugby Football League since 2020; in Kingsclere, Hampshire; the daughter of Ian Balding

== January 30, 1971 (Saturday) ==
- The UCLA Bruins college basketball team began a winning streak of 88 consecutive games, defeating UC-Santa Barbara 74–61, seven days after losing to the Fighting Irish of Notre Dame, 89–82. Coincidentally, Notre Dame would end the streak, defeating UCLA 71–70 on January 19, 1974.
- Died: Winifred Goldring, 82, American palaeontologist

== January 31, 1971 (Sunday) ==
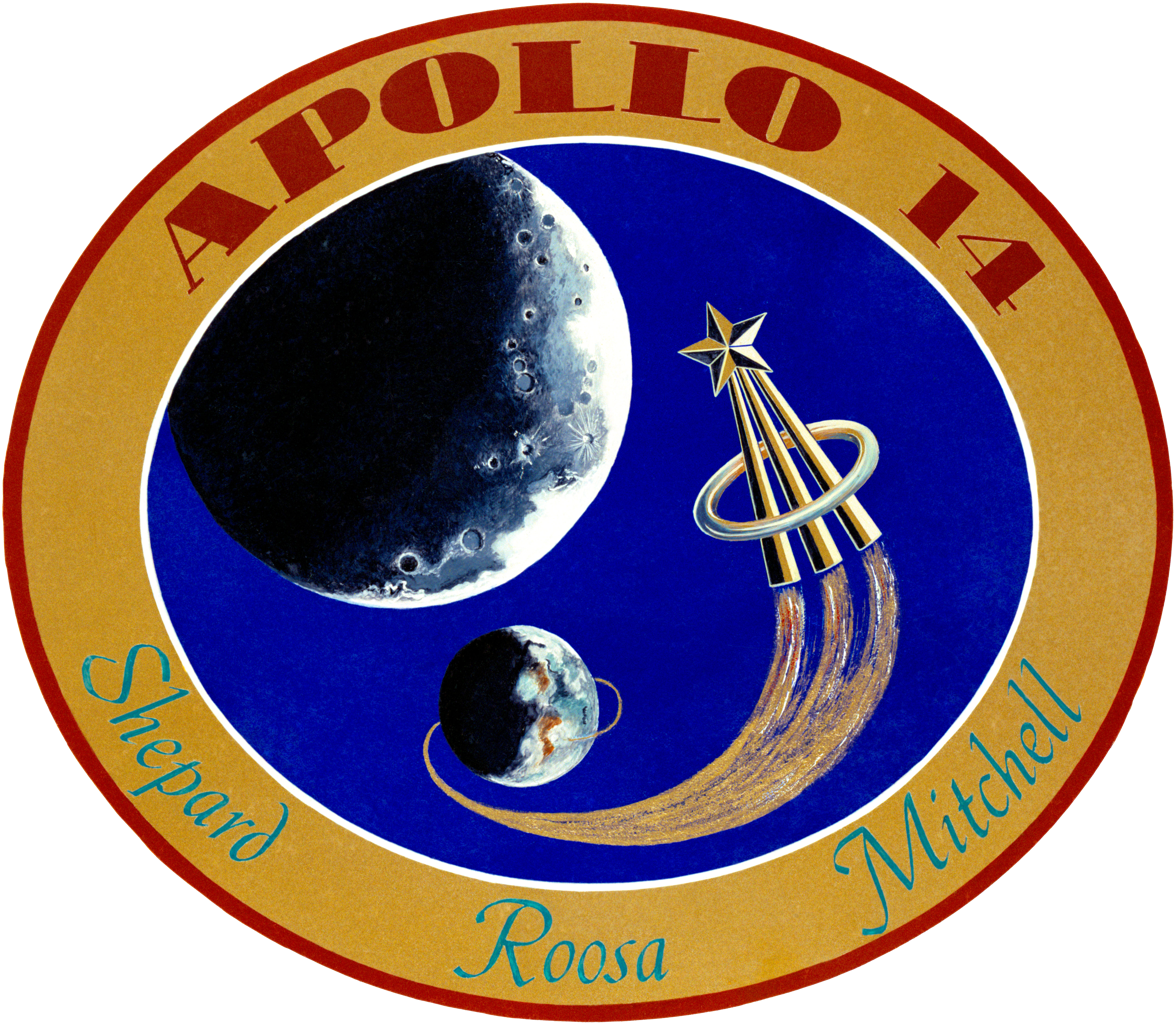

- Apollo 14, carrying astronauts Alan B. Shepard Jr., Stuart Roosa, and Edgar Mitchell on the first crewed lunar mission since the failure of Apollo 13, lifted off from Cape Kennedy at 4:03 p.m. local time (2103 UTC). The mission was almost aborted after "a harrowing two-hour struggle" to dock the command ship with the lunar module that would be used to carry Shepard and Mitchell to a lunar landing. The secure docking was finally achieved but, as a reporter noted afterward "if the two craft had failed to make a firm link-up, all plans for a landing on the moon early next Friday would have been abandoned." Shepard, who had been the first American to travel into outer space, would become the oldest person to walk on the Moon on February 4.
- At 6:00 in the morning, telephone service between East Germany and West Germany was opened for the first time in almost 20 years, with ten lines available for families separated by the Berlin Wall to talk to each other. Under the agreement, the system would handle a maximum of 750 calls per day, and the quota was reached at 8:30, two and a half hours after it started. Phone service between the two Germanys had been halted since May 1952.
- Died: Gunnar Jahn, 88, Norwegian jurist, economist, statistician, Liberal politician and resistance member
