= List of shipwrecks in 1971 =

The list of shipwrecks in 1971 includes ships sunk, foundered, grounded, or otherwise lost during 1971.

table of contents
1971
Jan	Feb	Mar	Apr
May	Jun	Jul	Aug
Sep	Oct	Nov	Dec
Unknown date

== January ==
=== 7 January ===
List of shipwrecks: 7 January 1971
Ship	State	Description
Kolno	Poland	The cargo ship ran aground off Falsterbo, Sweden, withdrawn from service as a result and converted to a floating boilerhouse.
West Shore	Norway	The supply vessel foundered in the North Sea one nautical mile (1.9 km; 1.2 mi) off the oil rig Ocean Viking. All thirteen crew rescued.

=== 8 January ===
List of shipwrecks: 8 January 1971
Ship	State	Description
Antilles	France	The ocean liner ran aground off Mustique, St Vincent and the Grenadines and caught fire when her fuel tanks ruptured. All passengers and crew took to the lifeboats and were rescued by Queen Elizabeth 2 (United Kingdom).

=== 10 January ===
List of shipwrecks: 10 January 1971
Ship	State	Description
Vrachos	Panama	The cargo ship caught fire at Galaţi, Romania and was beached in the Sulina Canal. Consequently scrapped.

=== 11 January ===
List of shipwrecks: 11 January 1971
Ship	State	Description
Texaco Caribbean	Panama	It was struck by the 12,000-tonne Paracas (Peru) at 4:10 in thick fog. Paracas had ignored the shipping lanes so that it could take a quicker route down the channel. Texaco Caribbean exploded from the bunker oil fumes in its hold. It split in two, the bow section sinking immediately, the stern section drifting for several hours before sinking too, resulting in 600 tonnes of bunker fuel being spilled. The incident occurred in the English Channel 13 km (8.1 mi) off Folkestone with the loss of at least eight lives. The explosion was so great that property was damaged in Folkestone. 20 survivors were rescued by Bravagos (Norway) and the fishing vessel Viking Warrior (United Kingdom). The survivors were taken to Dover. Paracas was towed to Hamburg, West Germany.

=== 12 January ===
List of shipwrecks: 12 January 1971
Ship	State	Description
Brandenburg	West Germany	Despite the British coastal authorities placing three vertical green lights on site to warn other ships of the presence of the wreck, the 2,695-ton Brandenburg struck the wreck of Texaco Caribbean (Panama) at 07:30 and sank within minutes with the loss of 21 lives. Lifeboats did not have time to respond and only 11 survivors were picked out from the water by fishermen.

=== 14 January ===
List of shipwrecks: 14 January 1971
Ship	State	Description
Pasteur	Panama	The Shelt-type coaster sank off the Alida Shoal 00°56′N 107°53′E when on a voyage from Sibu, Sarawak to Singapore. She was well off the normal route at the time.

=== 18 January ===
List of shipwrecks: 18 January 1971
Ship	State	Description
Arizona Standard, and Oregon Standard	United States	The T2 tankers collided under the Golden Gate Bridge, San Francisco, California. Arizona Standard was on a voyage from Estero Bay to San Francisco. She put in to Richmond, California. She was subsequently repaired with a 56 feet (17 m) bow section from Oregon Standard. That ship was subsequently repaired at Richmond, using a 165 feet (50 m) bow section from Petrolite (United States).
Arctic Sea	United States	The crab-fishing vessel was reported aground on Fairmount Island (60.8722°N 147.4353°W) on the south-central coast of Alaska.

=== 27 January ===
List of shipwrecks: 27 January 1971
Ship	State	Description
Norland	United States	The fishing vessel ran aground and broke up on Barlow Island (58°23′30″N 134°54′00″W) in Southeast Alaska about 18 nautical miles (33 km; 21 mi) northwest of Juneau, Alaska. Her entire crew of three survived and was rescued by the buoy tender USCGC Clover ( United States Coast Guard).

=== 28 January ===
List of shipwrecks: 28 January 1971
Ship	State	Description
Hoveringham II	United Kingdom	The dredger sprang a leak, capsized and sank off Puffin Island, Anglesey. Her four crew were rescued by the Holyhead Lifeboat.

=== 31 January ===
List of shipwrecks: 31 January 1971
Ship	State	Description
Princess Margarethe	Denmark	The ferry ran aground off the Kullen Lighthouse, Sweden. All on board rescued by Kärmen (Denmark).

=== Unknown date ===
List of shipwrecks: Unknown January 1971
Ship	State	Description
Braconglen	Sri Lanka	The 137.5-foot (41.9 m), 338-ton, government-owned trawler sank in the harbor of Colombo, Sri Lanka.

== February ==
=== 3 February ===
List of shipwrecks: 3 February 1971
Ship	State	Description
Decora	United States	The fishing vessel sank after striking Colorado Reef (56°38′20″N 132°56′10″W) in Wrangell Narrows in the Alexander Archipelago in Southeast Alaska. The cutter USCGC Cape Henlopen ( United States Coast Guard) rescued her entire crew of five.

=== 6 February ===
List of shipwrecks: 6 February 1971
Ship	State	Description
Byzantium	Cyprus	The ship caught fire at Gibraltar, with its bridge deck and accommodation gutted. Repairs were deemed uneconomic and the ship was scrapped later in the year.

=== 10 February ===
List of shipwrecks: 10 February 1971
Ship	State	Description
Aguedal	Italy	The cargo ship ran aground 15 nautical miles (28 km) off the coast of Libya.

=== 11 February ===
List of shipwrecks: 11 February 1971
Ship	State	Description
Aragon	Cyprus	The Liberty ship Collided with the tanker Hydrophane (Bulgaria) in the Strait of Dover (51°10′N 1°36′E). Aragon was Cuba to Rostock, East Germany. Declared uneconomic to repair, she was scrapped March.

=== 13 February ===
List of shipwrecks: 13 February 1971
Ship	State	Description
Velta	Costa Rica	The cargo ship sprang a leak and sank in the Atlantic Ocean 200 nautical miles (370 km) south east of the Azores (32°07′N 23°26′W). She was on a voyage from Macapá, Brazil to Bilbao, Spain.

=== 17 February ===
List of shipwrecks: 17 February 1971
Ship	State	Description
Ferncastle	Norway	The 52,510 GRT oil tanker sustained an explosion, broke in two, and sank at 35°43′N 13°15′W, about 350 nautical miles (650 km) west of Cádiz. She was in ballast, en route from Wilhelmshaven to Forçados, Nigeria. Seven crew members were lost. The 499 GRT cargo ship Navipesa Dos (Spain) rescued 36 survivors, and on 19 February landed them at Lisbon.

=== 18 February ===
List of shipwrecks: 18 February 1971
Ship	State	Description
Achillet	Lebanon	The cargo ship sprang a leak and was abandoned 300 nautical miles (560 km) southwest of Walvis Bay, South West Africa. She was on a voyage from Sfax, Morocco to Madras, India. She foundered on 25 February at 19°00′S 10°19′E.

=== 22 February ===
List of shipwrecks: 22 February 1971
Ship	State	Description
Endeavour II	New Zealand	The three-masted auxiliary barque was driven ashore in Parengarenga Harbour, a few miles south of North Cape. She was en route to New Zealand from Australia, and after being becalmed encountered a gale on rounding North Cape and failed to make Houhora Harbour. The crew of 13 men and one woman landed safely, there were no fatalities. She was the first square-rigged sailing vessel wrecked on the New Zealand coast for more than 50 years. Endeavour II had taken part in the 1970 bi-centenary re-enactment of James Cook's landing at Botany Bay, Sydney on 29 April 1970.
Ocean Castle	United States	The fishing vessel sank in the Gulf of Alaska near the Barren Islands (58°57′N 152°15′W) off the south-central coast of Alaska after colliding with the tanker Hawaiian Standard (flag unknown). Hawaiian Standard rescued her crew of four.

=== 26 February ===
List of shipwrecks: 26 February 1971
Ship	State	Description
Wafra	Liberia	The tanker ran aground at Cape Agulhas, South Africa.

=== 27 February ===
List of shipwrecks: 27 February 1971
Ship	State	Description
Niki	Greece	A light ship and five light buoys were added above the site of the wreck of Texaco Caribbean (Panama) by Trinity House. However, the ship Niki, sailing out of Dunkirk, ignored these and additional warnings of the nearby tanker Hebris. As observed by Hebris, Niki hit the submerged wreck(s) at about 8.16 pm and sank with the loss of all 21 crew and 1 passenger (the chief engineer's wife) before Hebris could perform a rescue of the men that had been observed in the water. Ten bodies were subsequently recovered.
Esso Antwerp	Belgium	The ship collided with Panachaikon (Liberia) and sank in the River Scheldt. Later raised, repaired and returned to service.

=== 28 February ===
List of shipwrecks: 28 February 1971
Ship	State	Description
Maureen Greer	United States	The crab-fishing vessel sank at the entrance to Uganik Bay (57°50′N 153°32′W) on the coast of Kodiak Island in Alaska. Her crew of three survived.

== March ==
=== 1 March ===
List of shipwrecks: 1 March 1971
Ship	State	Description
Borella	South Africa	The stripped, out of service 165.3-foot (50.4 m) 524-ton trawler was scuttled by the South African Navy in Simonstown Bay, or False Bay.
USS Reuben James	United States Navy	The decommissioned Buckley-class destroyer escort was sunk as a target.

=== 2 March ===
List of shipwrecks: 2 March 1971
Ship	State	Description
Trinity Navigator	Sweden	The tanker ran aground off Berry Head, Devon, United Kingdom.

=== 3 March ===
List of shipwrecks: 3 March 1971
Ship	State	Description
Henna	Panama	The bulk carrier, a converted T2 tanker, sprang a leak and foundered in the Indian Ocean (34°57′S 72°08′E). Her crew were rescued by Gladstone Star (United Kingdom). Henna was on a voyage from Bunbury, Western Australia to Savannah, Georgia, United States.

=== 4 March ===
List of shipwrecks: 4 March 1971
Ship	State	Description
Angela	United States	Carrying a cargo of powdered cement, the 420-foot (130 m), 8,512-gross register ton barge broke her towline during a storm and was wrecked on Old Cock Ledge, a reef off Westport, Massachusetts. She sank in waters up to 35 feet (11 m) deep, becoming partially submerged.
USS Gregory	United States Navy	The decommissioned Fletcher-class destroyer was deliberately run aground on San Clemente Island off Southern California for use as a target.

=== 12 March ===
List of shipwrecks: 12 March 1971
Ship	State	Description
Wafra	Liberia	The tanker was towed out to sea and sunk by bombing from South African Air Force aircraft.

=== 28 March ===
List of shipwrecks: 28 March 1971
Ship	State	Description
Texaco Oklahoma	United States	The tanker broke in two on 27 March and foundered on 28 March, 100 miles (160 km) due east of Sandbridge off Virginia with the loss of 33 of her 44 crew.

=== 30 March ===
List of shipwrecks: 30 March 1971
Ship	State	Description
Panther	Liberia	The tanker ran aground on the Goodwin Sands, off the coast of Kent, United Kingdom. She was refloated on 4 April.

=== 31 March ===
List of shipwrecks: 31 March 1971
Ship	State	Description
Christos	Liberia	The cargo ship ran aground on Kandeliusa Island, Kos, Greece. She was refloated on 1 April but developed leaks and sank later the same day.

== April ==
=== 1 April ===
List of shipwrecks: 1 April 1971
Ship	State	Description
Christos	Liberia	Aground on Kandeliusa Island, Kos, Greece, since 31 March, the cargo ship was refloated but developed leaks and sank at 36°32′N 26°57′E.

=== 12 April ===
List of shipwrecks: 12 April 1971
Ship	State	Description
Adak	United States	The motor vessel sank near Eliza Harbor (57°09′N 134°17′W) on the coast of Admiralty Island in the Alexander Archipelago in Southeast Alaska.

=== 15 April ===
List of shipwrecks: 15 April 1956
Ship	State	Description
Lynda K	United States	The fishing vessel was lost in the Gulf of Alaska somewhere between Homer and Seward, Alaska.

=== 19 April ===
List of shipwrecks: 19 April 1971
Ship	State	Description
Fortuna	United States	The Liberty ship developed cracks in her deck. She was on a voyage from Seattle, Washington to Kodiak, Alaska. She put back to Seattle, where she was declared a constructive total loss and was consequently scrapped.

=== 20 April ===
List of shipwrecks: 20 April 1971
Ship	State	Description
Cohansey	Panama	The T2 tanker collided with Marimunda (Sweden) off Pladju, Indonesia. Arrested and laid up at Singapore, she was scrapped in 1973.

=== 21 April ===
List of shipwrecks: 21 April 1971
Ship	State	Description
Stork	Royal Navy	The Troubles: The survey launch, attached to the survey ship HMS Hecate (Royal Navy), was towed out to sea, bombed, and sunk in the Atlantic Ocean off Baltimore, Ireland, by a Provisional Irish Republican Army unit.

=== 26 April ===
List of shipwrecks: 26 April 1971
Ship	State	Description
Ostrich	Provisional Government of Bangladesh; Mukti Bahini	Bangladesh Liberation War: The ship was sunk by Pakistan Air Force F-86 Sabre aircraft.

=== 27 April ===
List of shipwrecks: 27 April 1971
Ship	State	Description
Kiejak	United States	The fishing vessel flooded, ran aground, and was lost in Dry Bay (59°08′N 138°25′W) on the south-central coast of Alaska. Her crew of four survived.

=== 28 April ===
List of shipwrecks: 28 April 1971
Ship	State	Description
USS Whitehurst	United States Navy	USS Whitehurst sinking The Buckley-class destroyer escort was sunk as a torpedo target in the Pacific Ocean off the United States West Coast by the submarine USS Trigger (United States Navy).

=== 30 April ===
List of shipwrecks: 30 April 1971
Ship	State	Description
Pacific	United States	Carrying a cargo of heavy construction equipment, the motor vessel sank in Portage Bay on the coast of Alaska. Reports of the sinking do not indicate in which of several Alaskan bodies of water named "Portage Bay" the sinking took place.

== May ==
=== 2 May ===
List of shipwrecks: 2 May 1971
Ship	State	Description
Tongass	United States	The fishing vessel ran aground and sank at the south end of Baranof Island in the Alexander Archipelago in Southeast Alaska. Another fishing vessel rescued all six members of her crew.

=== 15 May ===
List of shipwrecks: 15 May 1971
Ship	State	Description
Herulv	Norway	The tanker was involved in a collision off the coast of Kent, United Kingdom and was holed.

=== 17 May ===
List of shipwrecks: 17 May 1971
Ship	State	Description
Ellinis	Greece	The ocean liner ran aground off Calshot, Hampshire, United Kingdom. She was refloated undamaged after two hours.

=== 20 May ===
List of shipwrecks: 20 May 1971
Ship	State	Description
Marjorie H	United States	The 40-gross register ton, 50-foot (15.2 m) halibut-fishing vessel struck a snag and sank off the Kenai Peninsula on the south-central coast of Alaska, 80 nautical miles (150 km; 92 mi) west of Resurrection Bay. Her crew of five abandoned ship in a life raft and were rescued by another fishing vessel on 22 May.

=== 31 May ===
List of shipwrecks: 31 May 1971
Ship	State	Description
Gyro Jumbo	United States	The fishing vessel sank during a storm with the loss of one life in the Copper River Delta on the south-central coast of Alaska.

=== Unknown date ===
List of shipwrecks: unknown
Ship	State	Description
ROKS PB 7	Republic of Korea Navy	The PB 3-class patrol craft was wrecked.
Viking L&R	Cayman Islands	The converted yacht foundered in Montego Bay, Jamaica.

== June ==
=== 1 June ===
List of shipwrecks: 1 June 1971
Ship	State	Description
USS Bugara	United States Navy	The Balao-class submarine sank in the Pacific Ocean off Cape Flattery, Washington while under tow.

=== 2 June ===
List of shipwrecks: 2 June 1971
Ship	State	Description
Agulleit	United States	The 23-ton, 54-foot (16.5 m) motor vessel was destroyed by ice at Emmonak, Alaska.

=== 28 June ===
List of shipwrecks: 28 June 1971
Ship	State	Description
Husky II	United States	The pilot boat was destroyed by fire about 1,000 yards (910 m) off Bethel, Alaska.

=== Unknown date ===
List of shipwrecks: Unknown date June 1971
Ship	State	Description
RPS Batanes	Philippine Navy	The LSM-1-class medium landing ship ran aground. She was decommissioned in 1971 as a result and was scrapped in 1972.

== July ==
=== 1 July ===
List of shipwrecks: 1 July 1971
Ship	State	Description
Clyde Venture	United Kingdom	The coastal tanker sank in the Rothesay Dock, Clydebank due to the actions of vandals.
HMS Artemis	Royal Navy	The Amphion-class submarine foundered at her moorings at Gosport, Hampshire. Subsequently raised and sold for scrap.

=== 3 July ===
List of shipwrecks: 3 July 1971
Ship	State	Description
Harlequin	United States	The motor vessel sank at Seward, Alaska.

=== 4 July ===
List of shipwrecks: 4 July 1971
Ship	State	Description
Koyo Maru	Japan	The coaster collided with another ship and sank off Japan.
Naniward Abone	Indonesia	The cargo ship collided with Ocean Prime (Liberia) and sank off Waikayama, Japan.
Rakusui Maru	Japan	The coaster collided with another ship and sank off Waikayama with the loss of eight of her nine crew.

=== 5 July ===
List of shipwrecks: 5 July 1971
Ship	State	Description
Ocean Glory	Liberia	The cargo ship sprang a leak and foundered in the Bay of Bengal. All crew rescued by Chilka (United Kingdom).

=== 13 July ===
List of shipwrecks: 13 July 1971
Ship	State	Description
Iron Mule	United States	The fishing vessel sank in bad weather in Cook Inlet near Kalgin Island on the south-central coast of Alaska. Two skiffs from a United States Air Force helicopter squadron from Elmendorf Air Force Base rescued all eight people and a spaniel who had been aboard Iron Mule.

=== 15 July ===
List of shipwrecks: 15 July 1971
Ship	State	Description
Selamat	Singapore	The coaster was driven ashore on Kalampunian Island, Malaysia and was abandoned by her crew. She was on a voyage from Sandakan to Kuching. She was a total loss.

=== 17 July ===
List of shipwrecks: 17 July 1971
Ship	State	Description
Selamat	Singapore	The vessel ran aground at Kalampunian Island, Borneo. The ship was abandoned as a total loss.

== August ==
=== 5 August ===
List of shipwrecks: 5 August 1971
Ship	State	Description
Bat Tiran	Israel	The cargo ship suffered an explosion and fire in Greek waters and was beached, a total loss. Palestinians claimed responsibility for the explosion. Later taken to Kartal, Turkey and scrapped. 1 crewman killed.
Mania	Liberia	Caught fire off Bari, Italy and abandoned. Beached at Split, Yugoslavia on 8 August. Scrapped in November 1971.

=== 7 August ===
List of shipwrecks: 7 August 1971
Ship	State	Description
Stag	United States	The crab-fishing vessel sank in bad weather off Land's End (59°37′N 151°27′W) on the Homer Spit in Homer, Alaska. A pleasure craft rescued her entire crew of three.

=== 10 August ===
List of shipwrecks: 10 August 1971
Ship	State	Description
Sugi	Japan Maritime Self-Defense Force	The decommissioned escort ship — formerly theTacoma-class patrol frigate USS Coronado (United States Navy) — was sunk as a target by a Japan Maritime Self-Defense Force escort ship in the Pacific Ocean south of Nojimazaki, Japan.

=== 16 August ===
List of shipwrecks: 16 August 1971
Ship	State	Description
Al-Abbas	Pakistan	Bangladesh Liberation War: The cargo ship was sunk by Mukti Bahini frogmen with limpet mines at Chittagong.
Hormux	Pakistan	Bangladesh Liberation War: The cargo ship was sunk by Mukti Bahini frogmen with limpet mines at Chittagong.
No. 6	Pakistan	Bangladesh Liberation War: The barge was sunk by Mukti Bahini frogmen with limpet mines at Chittagong.

=== 17 August ===
List of shipwrecks: 17 August 1971
Ship	State	Description
Red Sea	Hong Kong	Typhoon Rose: The cargo ship was driven ashore at Lanatu Island, Hong Kong. Refloated but scrapped the following month.
USS Regulus	United States Navy	USS Regulus Typhoon Rose: The Denebola-class stores ship was driven ashore at Kau-i-chau, Hong Kong. Subsequently declared a constructive total loss.

=== 19 August ===
List of shipwrecks: 19 August 1971
Ship	State	Description
Billy	Liberia	Typhoon Rose: The cargo ship was driven aground at Hong Kong. Declared a constructive total loss and sold for scrap.
HAM 308	Netherlands	The dredger collided with Polycastle (Norway) and sank in Jade Bight off Wilhelmshaven, West Germany with the loss of five crew and two other persons.

=== 30 August ===
List of shipwrecks: 30 August 1971
Ship	State	Description
Bertha Denz	West Germany	The trawler was in collision with Achatina (United Kingdom) and sank 25 nautical miles (46 km) west of Heligoland. Two crew rescued by Achatina.

== September ==
=== 3 September ===
List of shipwrecks: 3 September 1971
Ship	State	Description
Viking King	United States	The 87-foot (27 m) crab fishing vessel sank with the loss of two lives when she was swamped off Akun Island near Unalaska, Alaska. Her two survivors reached shore by clinging to an overturned life raft.

=== 4 September ===
List of shipwrecks: 4 September 1971
Ship	State	Description
Ricardo Manuel	Panama	The coaster was cut in two by Zagora (Morocco) and sunk at entrance to Casablanca harbour, Morocco. Ricardo Manuel was on a voyage from Lisbon, Portugal to Casablanca.

=== 5 September ===
List of shipwrecks: 5 September 1971
Ship	State	Description
Eleni	Greece	The cargo ship collided with Princess Ragnhild (Norway). Declared uneconomic to repair, scrapped in April 1972 at Santander, Spain.

=== 18 September ===
List of shipwrecks: 18 September 1971
Ship	State	Description
Chubby	United States	The fishing vessel was found adrift near Eldred Rock in Lynn Canal in Southeast Alaska. The only person who had been aboard disappeared without trace.
Jacaranda	Greece	The cargo ship was wrecked south west of the mouth of the Kabongaba River, South Africa.

=== 21 September ===
List of shipwrecks: 21 September 1971
Ship	State	Description
Precious Pearl	Hong Kong	The ship caught fire and sank in the South China Sea.

=== 22 September ===
List of shipwrecks: 22 September 1971
Ship	State	Description
Shapta Dinga	Pakistan	Bangladesh Liberation War: The cargo ship was sunk by Mukti Bahini frogmen with limpet mines at Chalna.

=== 24 September ===
List of shipwrecks: 24 September 1971
Ship	State	Description
Teviotbank	United Kingdom	The Bank Line cargo ship was damaged by East Bengal guerrillas at Chalna, East Pakistan.

=== 25 September ===
List of shipwrecks: 25 September 1971
Ship	State	Description
Clara J	United States	The motor vessel was destroyed by fire in Hoodoo Bay (60°03′30″N 148°00′30″W) in Prince William Sound on the south-central coast of Alaska.

=== 29 September ===
List of shipwrecks: 29 September 1971
Ship	State	Description
Apollo	Cyprus	Stranded four nautical miles (7.4 km) off Skije.

== October ==
=== 13 October ===
List of shipwrecks: 13 October 1971
Ship	State	Description
Western Offshore No. II	United States	The barge was hit by a blow-out during oil drilling operation 10 nautical miles (19 km) off Tumbes, Peru. She was declared a constructive total loss.

=== 14 October ===
List of shipwrecks: 14 October 1971
Ship	State	Description
London Valour	United Kingdom	The bulk carrier had run aground and broken her back at Genoa in April 1970, but Smit Tak International had refloated the after portion on 12 October 1971 and was towing it to be scuttled on the Balearic Abyssal Plain. About 90 miles (78 nmi; 140 km) out from Genoa the hulk sank in the early hours of 14 October.

=== 15 October ===
List of shipwrecks: 15 October 1971
Ship	State	Description
Ben Jon	United States	The 25-ton motor vessel sank in Kamishak Bay on the south-central coast of Alaska.
Precious Pearl	Singapore	The cargo ship caught fire 150 nautical miles (280 km) east of Hong Kong (22°00′N 116°54′E). She was taken in tow the next day by the tug Elbe (Netherlands), but sank on 17 October at 22°16′N 118°07′E. Precious Pearl was on a voyage from Kaohsiung, South Korea to Saigon, Vietnam.

=== 16 October ===
List of shipwrecks: 16 October 1971
Ship	State	Description
Softuk	United States	The motor vessel was found abandoned in Orca Inlet in Prince William Sound on the south-central coast of Alaska. One person aboard her was lost.

=== 18 October ===
List of shipwrecks: 18 October 1971
Ship	State	Description
Panaghia	Greece	The coaster sprang a leak 4 nautical miles (7.4 km) south of Cape Gata, Cyprus ande was abandoned the next day. She was taken in tow by Pelas (Greece) but sank the next day (34°27′N 33°30′E). Panaghia was on a voyage from "Marina de Caratta" to Beirut, Lebanon.

=== 22 October ===
List of shipwrecks: 22 October 1971
Ship	State	Description
Loch Seaforth	United Kingdom	The mailboat ran aground off Skye. All 26 passengers rescued, ship later refloated.

=== 30 October ===
List of shipwrecks: 30 October 1971
Ship	State	Description
Nam Sanh	South Vietnam	The coaster was stranded and wrecked at Chu Lai, South Vietnam, during a typhoon.

== November ==
=== 4 November ===
List of shipwrecks: 4 November 1971
Ship	State	Description
Mahtab Javed II	Pakistan	Bangladesh Liberation War: The tanker was sunk by Mukti Bahini frogmen with limpet mines near Chittagong.

=== 5 November ===
List of shipwrecks: 5 November 1971
Ship	State	Description
Lynda	United States	The fishing vessel was wrecked near Cape Mordvinof (54°56′45″N 164°26′00″W) on the northwest coast of Unimak Island in the Aleutian Islands.

=== 8 November ===
List of shipwrecks: 8 November 1971
Ship	State	Description
Saratoga	United States	The fishing vessel was wrecked on rocks near the mouth of Little Tonki Bay (56°20′N 152°04′W) on Afognak Island in the Kodiak Archipelago in the Gulf of Alaska. All seven men on board reached a rock, where a United States Coast Guard helicopter rescued them.

=== 9 November ===
List of shipwrecks: 9 November 1971
Ship	State	Description
Heythrop	United Kingdom	The OBO carrier exploded and caught fire 150 nautical miles (280 km) East London, South Africa. All on board were rescued by Showa Venture (Liberia). The captain and five officers later reboarded the ship, which was towed by the tugs Arctic and Statesman to Port Elizabeth. The ship was repaired and returned to service.
Maori	France	The cargo ship sank 250 nautical miles (460 km) off the coast of Spain. There was only one survivor of her 39 crew.

=== 14 November ===
List of shipwrecks: 14 November 1971
Ship	State	Description
USS Samuel B. Roberts	United States Navy	USS Samuel B. Roberts being sunk The decommissioned Gearing-class destroyer was sunk as a target in the Atlantic Ocean 195 nautical miles (361 km) north of Puerto Rico at 21°42.8′N 65°55.1′W.

=== 17 November ===
List of shipwrecks: 17 November 1971
Ship	State	Description
Elcano	Spain	The tanker sank off the Cape Verde Islands following an onboard explosion with the loss of four of her 35 crew.
Louise II	United States	The seiner ran aground on rocks and broke up in bad weather on Clam Island (55°58′48″N 133°15′30″W) in Southeast Alaska between Craig and Klawock, Alaska. Her crew of three survived.

=== 22 November ===
List of shipwrecks: 22 November 1971
Ship	State	Description
Astron	United States	After suffering an explosion, the 107-gross register ton, 74.8-foot (22.8 m) fishing vessel was destroyed by fire in the Bering Sea six nautical miles (11 km; 6.9 mi) north of Akutan Island in the Aleutian Islands. Her crew of four abandoned ship in a seven-foot (2.1 m) rubber life raft and was rescued on 25 November by the fishing trawler Chidori Maru No 51 (Japan) near North Head (54.2333333°N 165.9333333°W) on the coast of Akutan Island.
Chrysovalandou	Greece	Bangladesh Liberation War: The cargo ship was sunk by Mukti Bahini frogmen with limpet mines in the Pussur River.

=== 23 November ===
List of shipwrecks: 23 November 1971
Ship	State	Description
Mastro Stelius	Greece	Bangladesh Liberation War: The cargo ship was sunk by Mukti Bahini frogmen with limpet mines in the Pussur River.

=== 24 November ===
List of shipwrecks: 24 November 1971
Ship	State	Description
Columbia Trader	United States	The Victory ship was damaged by an underwater explosion at Chalna, Bangladesh. She was consequently scrapped.

=== 25 November ===
List of shipwrecks: 25 November 1971
Ship	State	Description
Barataria	United States	The 68-foot (20.7 m) tug sank in 136 feet (41 m) of water during a storm in Long Island Sound north-northeast of Southold, Long Island, New York. Two of her four crew members lost their lives. Her sinking was attributed to improper modifications that had been made to her.

=== 30 November ===
List of shipwrecks: 30 November 1971
Ship	State	Description
Juliana	Liberia	The tanker ran aground off Niigata, Japan and broke in two.

=== Unknown date ===
List of shipwrecks: Unknown date November 1971
Ship	State	Description
USS Roberts	United States Navy	The decommissioned Cannon-class destroyer escort was sunk as a target.

== December ==
=== 3 December ===
List of shipwrecks: 3 December 1971
Ship	State	Description
Seven Seas	United States	The fishing vessel disappeared near Kodiak Island off the south-central coast Alaska during a voyage to Wide Bay (57°22′N 156°11′W) with the loss of all four people on board.

=== 4 December ===
List of shipwrecks: 4 December 1971
Ship	State	Description
PNS Comilla	Pakistan Navy	Indo-Pakistan War of 1971: The Rajshahi-class patrol craft was sunk by Indian Hawker Sea Hawk aircraft in the Bay of Bengal off Chittagong.
PNS Ghazi	Pakistan Navy	Indo-Pakistan War of 1971: The Ghazi-class submarine was sunk in the Bay of Bengal off Visakhapatnam, India, by Indian surface ships, or loss by accidental explosion while laying mines, with the loss of her entire crew of 92.
PNS Khaibar	Pakistan Navy	Indo-Pakistan War of 1971 - Operation Trident: The Badr-class destroyer was sunk in the Arabian Sea south of Karachi, Pakistan, by two SS-N-2 Styx missiles fired by the missile boat INS Nirghat ( Indian Navy). 289 crewmen killed.
PNS Muhafiz	Pakistan Navy	Indo-Pakistan War of 1971 - Operation Trident: The Mahmood-class minesweeper was sunk in the Arabian Sea south of Karachi, Pakistan, by two SS-N-2 Styx missiles fired by the missile boat INS Veer ( Indian Navy).
Venus Challenger	Liberia	Indo-Pakistan War of 1971 - Operation Trident: The cargo ship was sunk in the Arabian Sea 26 nautical miles (48 km; 30 mi) south of Karachi, Pakistan, by an SS-N-2 Styx missile fired by the missile boat INS Nipat ( Indian Navy).

=== 5 December ===
List of shipwrecks: 5 December 1971
Ship	State	Description
PNS Salamat	Indian Navy	Indo-Pakistan War of 1971: The patrol craft was sunk by Breguet Alize aircraft from INS Vikrant ( Indian Navy) in the Bay of Bengal.
PNS Shahbaz	Pakistan Navy	Indo-Pakistan War of 1971: The patrol craft was sunk by Breguet Alize aircraft from INS Vikrant ( Indian Navy) in the Bay of Bengal.

=== 6 December ===
List of shipwrecks: 6 December 1971
Ship	State	Description
Lightning	Ethiopia	Indo-Pakistan War of 1971: The cargo ship was sunk by Indian Air Force aircraft at Chulna.
Ondarroa	Spain	Indo-Pakistan War of 1971: The cargo ship was sunk by Indian Air Force aircraft at Chulna.
Thetic Charley	Greece	Indo-Pakistan War of 1971: The cargo ship was sunk by Hawker Sea Hawk aircraft from INS Vikrant ( Indian Navy).

=== 8 December ===
List of shipwrecks: 8 December 1971
Ship	State	Description
Unidentified patrol craft	Pakistan Navy	Indo-Pakistan War of 1971: Four patrol craft were sunk by gunfire in the Bay of Bengal by INS Brahmaputra ( Indian Navy).

=== 9 December ===
List of shipwrecks: 9 December 1971
Ship	State	Description
PNS Balaghat	Pakistan Navy	Indo-Pakistan War of 1971: The patrol craft was sunk by Hawker Sea Hawk aircraft from INS Vikrant ( Indian Navy).
Gulf Star	Panama	Indo-Pakistan War of 1971 - Operation Python: The cargo ship was sunk by one SS-N-2 Styx missile fired by the missile boat INS Vinash ( Indian Navy) at Karachi, Pakistan.
Harmattan	United Kingdom	Indo-Pakistani War of 1971 - Operation Python: The cargo ship was sunk by one SS-N-2 Styx missile fired by the missile boat INS Vinash ( Indian Navy) at Karachi, Pakistan. Seven crew were killed.
INS Khukri	Indian Navy	Indo-Pakistan War of 1971: The Khukri-class frigate was torpedoed and sunk in the Arabian Sea 35 nautical miles (65 km) southwest of Diu by PNS Hangor (Pakistan Navy) with the loss of 194 of her crew.
Makran	Pakistan	Indo-Pakistan War of 1971: The cargo ship was sunk by Indian Navy Hawker Sea Hawk aircraft at Chalna, East Pakistan.
Mustali	Pakistan	Indo-Pakistan War of 1971: The cargo ship was sunk by Indian Navy Hawker Sea Hawk aircraft in Chalna, East Pakistan.
Two unidentified landing craft tank	Pakistan Navy	Indo-Pakistan War of 1971: The two landing craft tanks were sunk by Hawker Sea Hawk aircraft from INS Vikrant ( Indian Navy).
Zoe	Greece	Indo-Pakistan War of 1971 - Operation Python: The tanker was shelled and set on fire at Karachi, Pakistan.

=== 10 December ===
List of shipwrecks: 10 December 1971
Ship	State	Description
Ocean Enterprise	Pakistan	Indo-Pakistan War of 1971: The cargo ship was sunk by Indian aircraft at Chalna-Mongla East Pakistan.
Nordpol/North Pole	Unknown	Indo-Pakistan War of 1971: The cargo ship was sunk by Indian aircraft at Chalna-Mongla East Pakistan.
Padma	Provisional Government of Bangladesh; Mukti Bahini	Indo-Pakistan War of 1971: The Ford-class ASW ship was sunk at Kulna on the Pussur River by Indian Air Force Folland Gnat aircraft. 14 survivors of Padma and Palash were rescued by INS Panvel ( Indian Navy).
Palash	Provisional Government of Bangladesh; Mukti Bahini	Indo-Pakistan War of 1971: The Ford-class ASW ship was sunk at Kulna on the Pussur River by Indian Air Force Folland Gnat aircraft. 14 survivors of Padma and Palash were rescued by INS Panvel ( Indian Navy).

=== 12 December ===
List of shipwrecks: 12 December 1971
Ship	State	Description
Al-Abbas	Pakistan	Indo-Pakistan War of 1971: The cargo ship was sunk at Chittagong by Indian Navy Hawker Sea Hawk aircraft.
Anisbaksh	Pakistan	Indo-Pakistan War of 1971: The cargo ship was sunk at Chittagong by Indian Navy Hawker Sea Hawk aircraft.
Avlos	Brazil	Indo-Pakistan War of 1971: The tanker was sunk at Chittagong by Indian Navy Hawker Sea Hawk aircraft. Raised and scrapped April 1972.

=== 13 December ===
List of shipwrecks: 13 December 1971
Ship	State	Description
Surma	Pakistan	Indo-Pakistan War of 1971: The cargo ship was bombed, capsized and sank at Chittagong by Indian Navy Hawker Sea Hawk aircraft.

=== 14 December ===
List of shipwrecks: 14 December 1971
Ship	State	Description
Katata Maru	Japan	The 310-foot (94.5 m) fish processing vessel – which had caught fire 200 nautical miles (370 km; 230 mi) west of Adak Island in the Aleutian Islands, been abandoned by her crew (which the United States Coast Guard rescued), and then been towed to Adak, where she was pumped full of water to extinguish the fire – was towed out of the harbor at Adak by a United States Navy tug to a point 20 nautical miles (37 km; 23 mi) away in the Bering Sea, where she capsized and sank in deep water.

=== 16 December ===
List of shipwrecks: 16 December 1971
Ship	State	Description
Saint Mark	United States	The 139-gross register ton, 79.6-foot (24.3 m) crab-fishing vessel disappeared in the Gulf of Alaska during a voyage from Kodiak to Seward, Alaska, with the loss of all four people on board. She was last seen off Port William on Shuyak Island in the Kodiak Archipelago, apparently trying to escape rough seas.

=== 19 December ===
List of shipwrecks: 19 December 1971
Ship	State	Description
Tralee Trader	Panama	The coaster foundered 10 nautical miles (19 km) off Land's End, United Kingdom. All crew rescued by the trawler Petronella (Netherlands).

=== 19 December ===
List of shipwrecks: 19 December 1971
Ship	State	Description
Palmer Gaillard	United States	The tug caught fire 20 nautical miles (37 km) off the Diamond Shoal Lighthouse, North Carolina. Her crew were rescued by a helicopter. She was towing a new midbody section of the T2 tanker Colorado (United States) from Beaufort, North Carolina to Norfolk, Virginia.

=== Unknown date ===
List of shipwrecks: Unknown December 1971
Ship	State	Description
PNS Jessore	Pakistan Navy	Indo-Pakistan War of 1971: The Rajshahi-class patrol craft was damaged on 4 or 11 December by Breguet Alize aircraft from INS Vikrant ( Indian Navy) in the Bay of Bengal and beached. Refloated after the War, repaired and put in Bangladeshi Navy service.
PNS Sylhet	Pakistan Navy	Indo-Pakistan War of 1971: The Rajshahi-class patrol craft was sunk on 4 or 6 December by aircraft from INS Vikrant ( Indian Navy) in the Bay of Bengal.

== Unknown date ==
List of shipwrecks: Unknown date 1971
Ship	State	Description
Altair	Italian Navy	The frigate was sunk as a target.
Hela	United States	The 32-gross register ton 52.1-foot (15.9 m) motor vessel sank in the Lower Yukon River in central Alaska.
Katmai	United States	The crab-fishing vessel sank in deep water off the Alaska Peninsula. Her crew of four survived.
Menlo	United States	The 23-gross register ton, 47.4-foot (14.4 m) fishing vessel sank with the loss of three lives after striking an unidentified submerged object in the waters of Alaska. Some reports claim that the incident occurred on 24 April near Portland Bank off the south end of the Kenai Peninsula at 58°25′N 150°15′W, others that it happened on 24 April near Seldovia, and still others that it took place sometime in June in Southeast Alaska 45 nautical miles (83 km; 52 mi) southeast of Juneau.
Nissei Maru	Japan	The 90-ton fishing vessel capsized and sank in the Bering Sea north of Unalaska Island in the Aleutian Islands with the loss of ten lives. Other fishing vessels rescued her eight survivors.
