= Ricardo Manuel =

Ricardo Manuel may refer to

== People ==
- Ricardo Manuel Ferreira Sousa
- Ricardo Manuel da Silva Fernandes
- Ricardo Manuel Cardoso Martins
- Ricardo Manuel Andrade e Silva Sá Pinto
- Ricardo Manuel Ciciliano Bustillo

== Ships ==
- MV Ricardo Manuel, a Panamanian coaster in service 1963-71
