= February 1971 =

Month of 1971

<<	February 1971					>>
Su	Mo	Tu	We	Th	Fr	Sa
	1	2	3	4	5	6
7	8	9	10	11	12	13
14	15	16	17	18	19	20
21	22	23	24	25	26	27
28

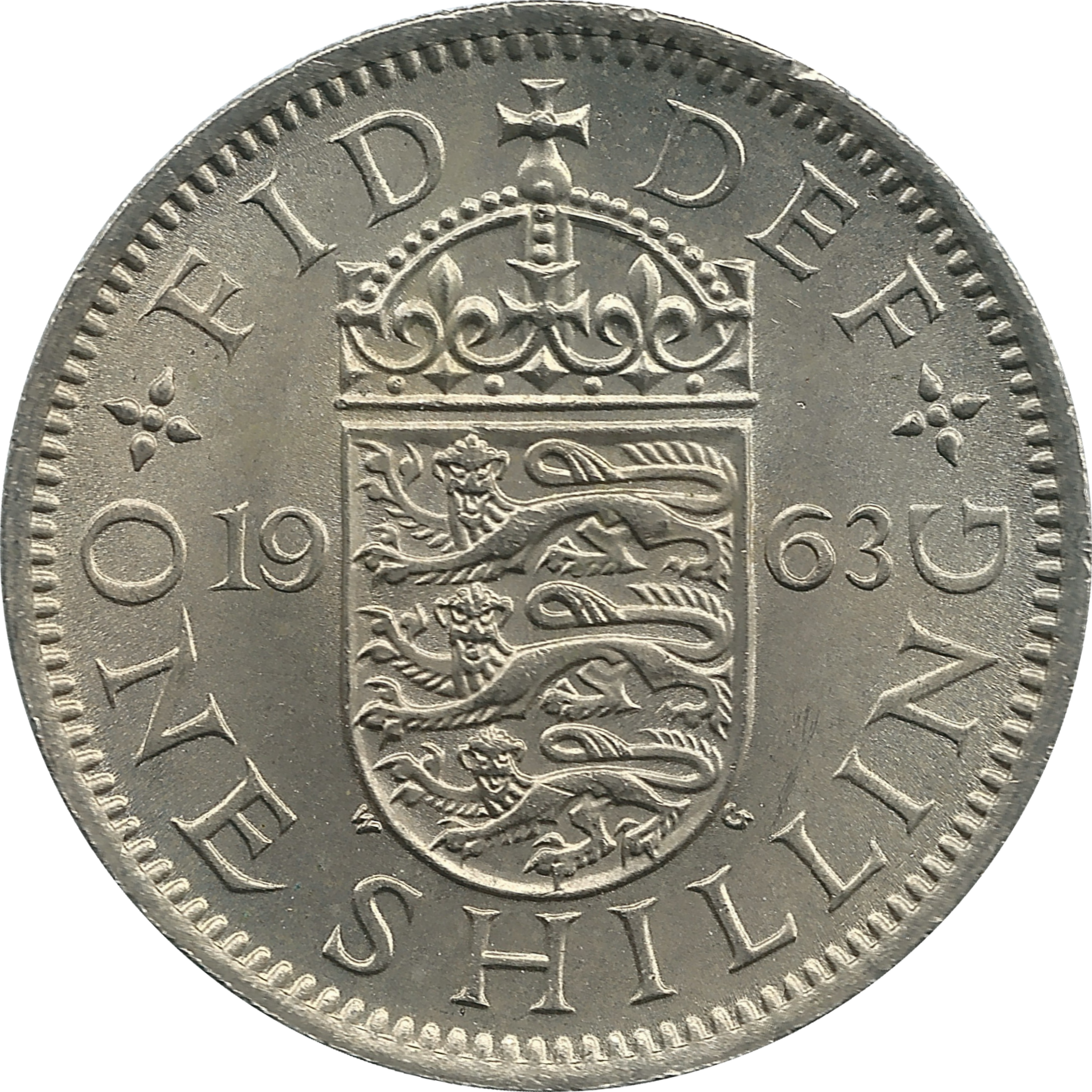
February 15, 1971: Decimalisation Day takes place in the UK; the shilling, formerly worth 12 pence, replaced by "five new pence" coin

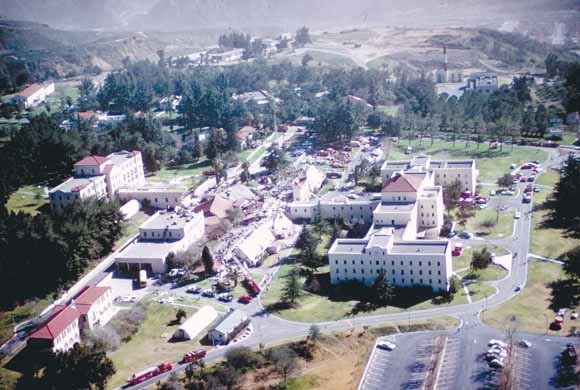
February 9, 1971: Earthquake in Los Angeles collapses VA hospital, kills 38 people

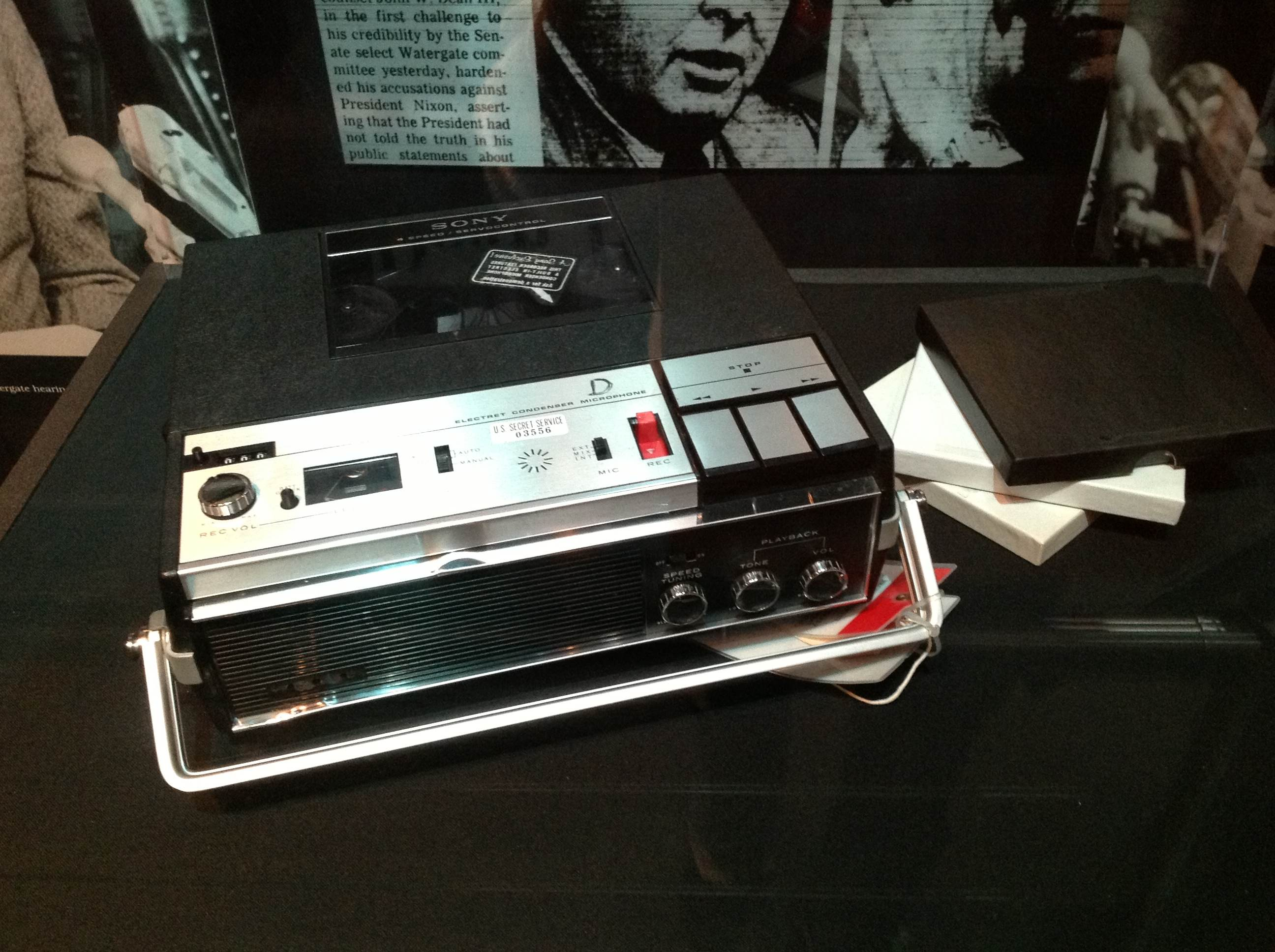
February 16, 1971: U.S. President Nixon activates secret tape recording system in White House

The following events occurred in February 1971:

== February 1, 1971 (Monday) ==
- The Soviet Union opened the Institute for Management of the National Economy, the first school in a Communist nation for business administration and for management science, long rejected as a feature of Western capitalism. The institute was inaugurated within the Plekhanov Russian University of Economics and had been lobbied for by Dzhermen Gvishiani, the Deputy Chairman of the State Committee for Science and Technology (GKNT).
- Uganda's President Idi Amin ordered the dismissal of all municipal and village officials in the central African nation, firing every mayor and district councilmen because they had been appointed under the regime of the previous president, Milton Obote. People identified with Obote's political party, the Uganda People's Congress, were attacked throughout the nation.
- The Hague Conference on Private International Law passed its convention on the Recognition and Enforcement of Foreign Judgments in Civil and Commercial Matters.
- British commercial diver Michael Lally died of hypothermia and drowning due to a decompression problem while conducting a surface-orientated dive in the North Sea from the semi-submersible drill rig Ocean Viking. Another British diver, Michael Brushneen, would die exactly one month later during a dive from the same rig.
- Died:
  - Raoul Hausmann, 84, Austrian artist and writer
  - Harry Roy, 71, English bandleader
  - Amet-khan Sultan, 50, Crimean Tatar fighting ace for the Soviet Air Force, killed in the crash of a Tupolev Tu-16 he was piloting.

== February 2, 1971 (Tuesday) ==
- The Ramsar Convention (the Convention on Wetlands of International Importance especially as Waterfowl Habitat), an international treaty for the conservation and sustainable use of wetlands, was signed by representatives of seven nations in Ramsar, Mazandaran, Iran. By its terms, the treaty went into effect on December 21, 1975. February 2 is now regularly observed by environmentalists as World Wetlands Day. The signing came on the same day that a meeting in the Iranian capital of Tehran, between the 10-nation Organization of Petroleum Exporting Countries (OPEC) and representatives of 22 oil companies to negotiate a price rise in oil.
- Eight days after leading a coup d'état, General Idi Amin Dada ordered the dissolution of the Ugandan Parliament and declared himself President of Uganda, assuming all executive and legislative authority and pledging to begin rule by decree.

== February 3, 1971 (Wednesday) ==
- In Tehran, the representatives of the ten OPEC member states adopted the "XXII Conference Resolution", in which each nation pledged that by February 15, they would have in place the necessary regulatory or legislative measures necessary to implement an embargo on shipments of crude oil to any of the 22 oil companies that failed to accept payment of a 55% tax, with the cutoff of oil to take place on February 21. The companies signed the agreement with the OPEC nations on February 14.
- Eight people were killed by the explosion of a gas pipeline in Lambertville, New Jersey at about 8:00 in the morning, two hours after they had escaped injury in an earlier explosion in the same area.
- An explosion at the Thiokol chemical plant near Woodbine, Georgia, killed 29 employees and seriously injured 50 others. The explosion, believed to have been due to a fire caused by tripflares being manufactured by Thiokol for use in the ongoing Vietnam War, occurred at 10:53 in the morning.
- Died: Jay C. Flippen, 71, US actor

== February 4, 1971 (Thursday) ==
- The British luxury car and jet engine manufacturer Rolls-Royce declared bankruptcy, after sustaining financial losses in developing the engine for the Lockheed L-1011 TriStar jumbo jet under a misjudged price contract agreement. The British government would subsequently nationalise the Rolls engine operations as a matter of national security and British pride.
- Died: Brock Chisholm, 74, Canadian World War I veteran, physician and first Director-General of the World Health Organization (WHO)

== February 5, 1971 (Friday) ==
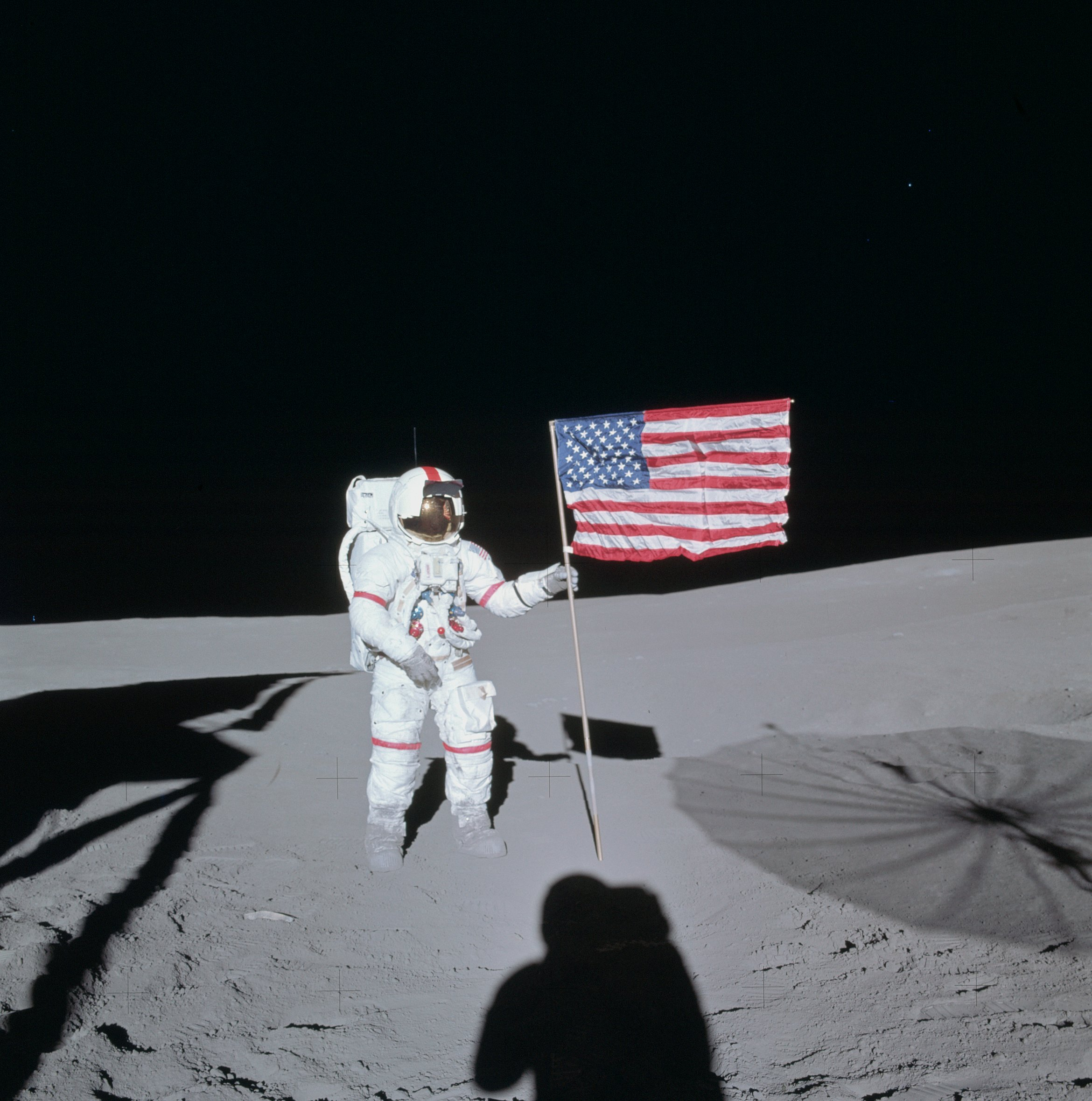
Alan Shepard on the Moon

- At 0918 UTC (4:05 a.m. Eastern Time), the Apollo 14 mission commanded by Alan Shepard, achieved the third crewed lunar landing. The lunar module Antares on the Apollo 14 mission, landed on the Moon near the Fra Mauro crater, the site that Apollo 13 had intended to explore. Stuart Roosa remained in orbit on the command module Kitty Hawk. At 9:49 a.m. Eastern (1449 UTC), Shepard set foot on the Moon, and then he and Edgar Mitchell began deploying scientific equipment. They were the first Apollo crew to use the Modular Equipment Transporter (MET), a two-wheeled cart used to carry equipment. While on the Moon, Shepard surprised television viewers around the world by driving two golf balls, in the lesser lunar gravity, with a makeshift golf club.
- The beginning of the week of the Hajj, the required pilgrimage to Mecca as one of the Five Pillars of Islam, attracted a record number of believers at its start on the 9th day of Dhu al-Hijjah, with more than one million Saudis and foreign Muslims starting from Mount Ararat to reach Mecca. The growth of the number of pilgrims followed improvements in the Saudi transportation infrastructure, including an expansion of the Jeddah airport that could accommodate 120 aircraft landings and 10,000 visitors per day.
- The first performance of the musical Grease took place at the Kingston Mines Theater in Chicago, with music and lyrics by Jim Jacobs and Warren Casey. The show would move to New York City and become a long-running hit on Broadway and a popular film.
- The 28th Golden Globe Awards ceremony was held by the Hollywood Foreign Press Association at the Beverly Hilton in Beverly Hills, California. Love Story and M*A*S*H won the awards for motion pictures for best drama and best musical or comedy. George C. Scott (for Patton) and Ali MacGraw (for Love Story) won the Best Actor and Best Actress Awards for a Motion Picture Drama, respectively, and Albert Finney (for Scrooge) and Carrie Snodgress (for Diary of a Mad Housewife) won the top acting awards for Motion Picture Musical or Comedy. Medical Center and The Carol Burnett Show won the Golden Globes for Best TV Drama and Best TV Comedy.
- Born: Peter Cipollone, American Olympic oarsman and coxswain of the U.S. gold medal-winning team in 2004; in Marietta, Ohio
- Died: Mátyás Rákosi, 78, General Secretary of the Hungarian Communist Party from 1948 to 1956 until his forced removal under pressure from the Soviet Union prior to the Hungarian Revolution.

== February 6, 1971 (Saturday) ==
- An earthquake in Italy's Lazio region killed 31 people in the city of Tuscania.
- Gunner Robert Curtis became the first British Army soldier to die in the Northern Ireland Conflict (referred to colloquially as "The Troubles") between the majority Protestant and minority Catholic residents of Northern Ireland, and between supporters and opponents of the area remaining within the United Kingdom of Great Britain and Northern Ireland rather than as a part of the Republic of Ireland.
- A fire broke out at Mike's Grocery in Wilmington, North Carolina, the product of a firebomb, followed by riots, and leading to the wrongful conviction of the "Wilmington Ten". In 1972, the men would be convicted of arson and conspiracy after prosecutorial misconduct, and receive sentences ranging from 15 to 34 years in prison. The sentences would be reduced in 1978 by the state Governor, and in 1980, the convictions would be overturned by a federal court which concluded that prosecutors had suppressed evidence. Finally, on December 31, 2012, almost 42 years after the initial crime, the Wilmington Ten would be pardoned by North Carolina governor Beverly Perdue.
- At the first open gathering of gay women and men in Australia, held at Balmain, New South Wales, John Ware and Christabel Poll formally organized Campaign Against Moral Persecution (CAMP), the first LGBT rights advocacy in Australia.
- Apollo 14's lunar module successfully lifted off from the Moon's surface at 1:49 p.m. Eastern time (1837 UTC) and was reunited with the command module piloted by Stuart Roosa for the return voyage to Earth.

== February 7, 1971 (Sunday) ==
- In a referendum in Switzerland, male voters approved giving Swiss women the right to vote in national elections and the right to hold federal office, by a margin of 65.7% to 34.3%. In local elections, voting was still prohibited in eight the 22 cantons opposed could still prohibit women from voting in national elections.
- Wladyslaw Gomulka was expelled from the Central Committee of the Polish Communist Party, which criticized the former General Secretary of the Polish United Workers Party for "serious mistakes in recent years". Gomulka had already been removed as the leader of the Party (the de facto leader of the nation in the Communist-controlled state) and from the Politburo on December 20.

== February 8, 1971 (Monday) ==
- NASDAQ, a new stock exchange of the National Association of Securities Dealers Automated Quotations, began operations in New York, initially as the reporter of the NASDAQ Composite Index which consisted of "securities less widely held or those that, for other reasons, do not appear on the daily Over-the Counter list". The first list was of price quotations of companies publicly listed ranging from the wholesale pharmaceutical seller AmerisourceBergen Corporation (ABC) to the meatpacking company Zemco Industries (ZemcoInd), now a division of Tyson Foods.
- Operation Lam Son 719, an attack by the First Infantry Division of the Army of the Republic of Vietnam (ARVN) from South Vietnam into the Kingdom of Laos, was launched in the Vietnam War against North Vietnamese and Viet Cong forces operating across the border. The 3,000 ARVN troops crossed the border in armored columns and by American-piloted helicopter troopships and reached a trail complex 20 miles (32 km) south of Xépôn (Tchepone), the key enemy supply center for the Communists. The South Vietnamese designation replaced the American code name of "Operation Dewey Canyon II", and was the 719th ARVN operation to honor the Lam Son uprising by the Vietnamese people in 1418 against the Chinese Empire.
- South Africa's white minority government eased its apartheid regulations to a degree by allowing mixed-race Africans ("Coloureds") to work in construction jobs formerly limited to whites only. Black South Africans were still barred from working on "white" projects in Pretoria, and the change in policy, prompted by a shortage of skilled workers, was limited to bricklayers and plasterers. Gert Beetge, the general secretary of the all-white Union of Building Workers, criticized the decision of the Labor Ministry and said that it marked "the death knell to white building workers".
- The Siahkal incident marked the beginning of guerrilla attacks against the Iranian monarchy, with the killing of three police in the town of Siahkal in order to release two prisoners. The 11 surviving guerrillas, and both prisoners, were executed.
- The IBM company retired its first high-selling computer model, the IBM 1401, that had been introduced in 1959 and sold 12,000 units. The company also halted further sales of its less expensive version of the 1401, the IBM 1440.
- Born: Andrus Veerpalu, Estonian cross-country skier, Olympic gold medalist in 2002 and 2006; in Pärnu, Estonian SSR, Soviet Union

== February 9, 1971 (Tuesday) ==
- At exactly 41 seconds after 6:00 in the morning local time, the 6.5 M_{w} Sylmar earthquake struck the Greater Los Angeles Area with a maximum Mercalli intensity of XI (Extreme) and lasted 12 seconds. With an epicenter at the Pacoima section of Los Angeles, it killed 58 people by falling debris; another seven died from heart attacks. Most of the deaths were in the collapse of the Olive View hospital and the VA hospital in Sylmar.
- The six member nations of the European Economic Community (EEC), also known as the "Common Market", approved a plan to create a common unit of currency over the next ten years. The European Currency Unit (ECU) would be implemented by 1979 for use in international transactions involving the EEC members (Belgium, France, Italy, Luxembourg, the Netherlands, and West Germany) but the Euro would not be put in to circulation until 2002.

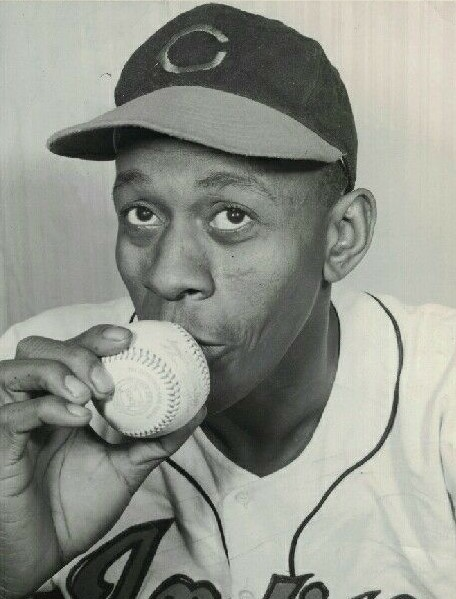
Paige

- Satchel Paige became the first primarily Negro league player to become voted into the Baseball Hall of Fame in Cooperstown, New York. Paige had played five full seasons in the American League after the integration of Major League Baseball, but was enshrined for his 18 years in the first and second Negro National Leagues and the Negro American League. The original plan by the Hall was to admit one Negro league player per year "as part of a new exhibit commemorating the contributions of the Negro leagues to baseball" to be honored plaques separately-located, but equal to those of the MLB players. After critics pointed out the irony of segregating the honor to the enshrined stars, the plan would be revised in time for Paige's formal enshrinement. At the time of the decision, only two African-American players— Jackie Robinson and Roy Campanella— were enshrined in the Hall of Fame. While both Robinson (for the Kansas City Monarchs) and Campanella (for the Washington Elite Giants) had also played in the Negro leagues, they had both been voted in for their MLB achievements.
- Apollo 14 returned to Earth after the third crewed Moon landing, with a splashdown in the South Pacific Ocean at 2105 UTC (10:05 a.m. local time) at a point south of Tonga. The capsule and the crew were picked up by the amphibious assault ship USS New Orleans.

== February 10, 1971 (Wednesday) ==
- Banks in the UK closed at 3:30 p.m. in order to rewrite all 25,000,000 bank accounts in the nation in preparation for Decimal Day, not reopening until the following Monday. Britain's post offices closed at 1:00 in the afternoon on February 12.
- U.S. President Richard Nixon ordered the installation of a voice-activated audio tape recording system to be installed within the Oval Office and the telephones used by the President in the White House. The order from Nixon was passed to Alexander Butterfield by way of White House Chief of Staff H.R. Haldeman and Haldeman's assistant, Lawrence Higby, making them the only White House officials aware of the secret recording system.
- The Senate of Chile approved an amendment to the South American nation's constitution to give President Salvador Allende authority to nationalize foreign interests in Chile's copper industry.
- Tapestry, recorded by Carole King and one of the best-selling record albums of all time, with 30 million copies sold, was released by A&M Records.
- Died: Larry Burrows, 44; Henri Huet, 43; Kent Potter, 23; and Keizaburo Shimamoto, 34, photojournalists covering Operation Lam Son, were all killed when the helicopter they were on was shot down over Laos.

== February 11, 1971 (Thursday) ==
- Representatives of the U.S., UK, USSR and 61 other nations signed the Seabed Arms Control Treaty (officially the Treaty on the Prohibition of the Emplacement of Nuclear Weapons and Other Weapons of Mass Destruction on the Sea-Bed and the Ocean Floor and in the Subsoil thereof), which opened for signature in Washington DC, London and Moscow outlawing nuclear weapons on the ocean floor. In all three capitals, American, British and Soviet officials signed; in each of the three sites, the host nation's head of government and foreign minister were joined by the ambassadors of the other two nations.

== February 12, 1971 (Friday) ==
- The United States and the Soviet Union entered into an agreement to respect each other's territorial waters when allowing their commercial fishing boats to fish for king crab or for tanner crab. The agreement, signed in Washington, entered into force the same day. Agreements between the U.S. and the Soviet Union on fishing.

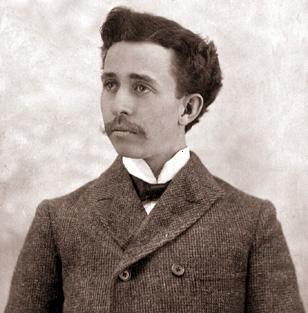
J. C. Penney (1875–1971)

- Died:
  - James Cash Penney, 95, American entrepreneur who founded the Golden Rule Store department store in Kemmerer, Wyoming in 1902 and had built it into a chain of 1,660 J.C. Penney stores by the time of his death.
  - Ella Cara Deloria, 83, Native American educator, anthropologist, ethnographer, linguist, and novelist

== February 13, 1971 (Saturday) ==
- The Soviet Union publicly released its latest "Five-Year Plan" (pyatiletniy plan), covering the period from January 1, 1971, to December 31, 1975, to be presented for approval at the 24th Soviet Communist Party Congress in April, and intended to focus on increasing the standard of living for the average Soviet citizen. The stated goals were "expanding economically-justified commercial, scientific and technical relations" with capitalist nations, and increases of at least 40% in national income, capital goods and consumer goods.
- Jean Hengen replaced the retiring Léon Lommel as the Roman Catholic Bishop of Luxembourg.
- Paul Esser, a 21-year-old cave diver, drowned in the Porth yr Ogof cave in Wales. His body would remain entombed in the cave for 39 years, and would not be recovered until April 2010.

== February 14, 1971 (Sunday) ==
- The "Tehran Agreement", obligating oil producers to pay a 55% tax rate on their exports of oil from six of the OPEC member states on the Persian Gulf (Saudi Arabia, Iran, Iraq, Kuwait, Qatar and Abu Dhabi of the United Arab Emirates) was signed by the representatives of 23 oil companies, all of whom faced an embargo by February 21. The accord was signed at the Iranian Finance Ministry shortly after 3:00 in the afternoon local time. A turning point in history, the agreement "passed the initiative in oil pricing from the multinational companies to the exporting countries", which would then steadily raise the price of petroleum during the rest of the 1970s. The original agreement was to immediately increase the price of a barrel (42 U.S. gallons) of crude oil by 35 cents (from a then-average price of $1.79 a barrel), followed by 5 cent increases annually, and had been negotiated by teams headed by Iranian Finance Minister Jamshid Amouzegar for the OPEC nations and by British Petroleum Chairman George Fraser, 2nd Lord Strathalmond.
- Poisonous fumes from a diesel fire killed 34 passengers and seriously injured 60 more on a train in Yugoslavia that had been halted in a tunnel outside of Vranduk, in what is now Bosnia. Most of the casualties were factory workers and miners who were among the 200 passengers. Investigators concluded that "nothing serious would have happened if the train had been in the open instead of a tunnel" and blamed the disaster on the train's engineer and fireman. An electrical spark had ignited diesel fuel in the locomotive's reservoir as it passed through the Vranduk tunnel, and the crew brought the train to a stop rather than exiting.
- Born:
  - Kris Aquino, Filipina actress, youngest daughter of Benigno Aquino Jr. and Corazon Aquino; in Quezon City
  - Gheorghe Mureșan, Romanian-born basketball and the tallest (7-foot, 7-inches or 2.31 meters) National Basketball Association player, along with 7'7" Manute Bol; in Tritenii de Jos
  - Nelson Frazier Jr., American professional wrestler for WWF and WWE, who performed under the ring names "Viscera", "Nelson Knight", "King Mabel" and "Big Daddy V"; in Goldsboro, North Carolina (died of heart attack 2014)

== February 15, 1971 (Monday) ==
- On Decimalisation Day, the United Kingdom and Ireland both switched to decimal currency at 10:00 a.m. as banks opened for conversion of money. As a reporter pointed out to non-Britons, "The old currency, the most complicated in the world, divided the pound into 20 shillings and the shilling into 12 pence... Now the pound is divided into 100 new pence, each worth 2.4 American cents." The shilling and the florin were replaced by the five pence and ten pence coins, and unusual denominations like the half crown (2 shillings and a sixpence) and the guinea had no decimal coin equivalent. The popular sixpence remained legal tender until being phased out. The Republic of Ireland converted its currency on the same day, allowing Ireland and the UK's Northern Ireland to have a similar system. Retired permanently was the old system of pricing in pounds, shillings and pence, referred to as £sd for the abbreviations of Latin terms for the British pounds (librae or "£."), shillings (solidi or "s.") and pennies (denarii or "d."). Thus, 2 pounds, 7 shillings and five pence was "£2.7s.5p." but became £2.37 afterward. However, the Decimal Currency Board had announced that "£sd will be legal tender for up to 18 months after D-day and some shops will be pricing and giving change in £sd," with the changeover period ending on August 15, 1972. In addition to Ireland, the African nation of Malawi went decimal on the same day, along with Gibraltar, while the Gambia, Nigeria and Malta continued to use the old system.
- "President's Day" was celebrated as a legal holiday nationwide in the U.S. for the first time, as new federal legislation took effect moving the George Washington's birthday holiday from February 22 to the third Monday in February. Washington had been born on February 22, 1732 ("February 11, 1731" under the Julian calendar at the time); the third Monday only falls in a range from the 15th to the 21st of the month and never on the actual anniversary of his birth. The federal holiday would become popularly known as President's Day in that it comes between the birthdays of Abraham Lincoln (born February 12, 1809) and of Washington, both days that had been observed as state holidays in the past.
- The government of Poland announced that it was reversing the increase of food prices that had triggered nationwide rioting in December, and that prices would return to normal on March 1. At the same time, Prime Minister Piotr Jaroszewicz announced that plans to raise wages would be halted as a compromise for the reduction of food prices.
- Angry over proposed price increases for agricultural supplies proposed by the European Economic Community (EEC)'s Agricultural Commissioner, a group of Belgian farmers brought three cows into a meeting room in Brussels where the six EEC nations' ministers of agriculture were meeting to discuss pricing. The "Young Farmers Alliance" carried out what one reporter noted was "a major feat of cowherding" in that they "had succeeded in driving three cows... through swift swing doors, past security guards, up three flights of marble steps, through a press room, down a corridor and into the council chamber." France's Minister of Agriculture commented that "It was an event unworthy of the construction of Europe".
- In West Dallas, Texas, two heroin addicts abducted five law enforcement officers from the Dallas County Sheriff's Department and the Ellis County Sheriff's Office, killing three of them and wounding a fourth. The fifth deputy escaped and summoned help. The suspects would be apprehended four days later after an extensive manhunt.

== February 16, 1971 (Tuesday) ==
- The first recording by the secret taping system installed by U.S. President Nixon was made. There were nine original microphones in the Oval Office––five in the president's desk and one on each side of the fireplace; and two in the Cabinet Room under the table near the president's chair. Years after the Watergate scandal, former White House Chief of Staff H. R. Haldeman would admit that it had been his suggestion to Nixon to make the system voice-activated rather than to be controlled by an on/off switch; Haldeman's thought at the time was "that this president was far too inept with machinery ever to make a success of a switch system." The first conversation, made sometime after 7:56 in the morning, was between Nixon and Alexander P. Butterfield and is saved as "Conversation 450-001" by the Nixon Library.
- Residents of Reggio di Calabria in Italy rioted for five days after the Regional Council of Calabria moved the capital of the regione from Reggio to Catanzaro, 75 miles (121 km) away.
- In what was later dubbed the "fuddle duddle incident", Canadian Prime Minister Pierre Trudeau was accused of mouthing obscenities at Opposition MPs in the Canadian House of Commons in Ottawa. News reports tastefully reported that MPs sitting across from Trudeau had "accused him of mouthing a two-word expression commonly translated without profanity to mean 'get lost'" and that "The prime minister later told reporters that he had said 'fuddle-duddle or something like that'." The incident added the euphemism "fuddle duddle" to the Canadian vocabulary and has made the news annually ever since.

== February 17, 1971 (Wednesday) ==
- For the first time in 12 years, England won The Ashes, the quadrennial Test cricket tournament against Australia, bringing the ceremonial cremation urn (containing the figurative ashes of the sport of cricket for the losing team) back to England. England was represented by the Marylebone Cricket Club, captained by Ray Illingworth and the 7-Test Series came down to the Seventh Test in Sydney, played over six days beginning February 12. In that England had won the Fourth Test on January 14 and four other matches were played to a draw with no winner, Australia would have retained possession of the Ashes if it could end the series as a 1–1 draw. England won by 62 runs (England 184 & 302 Australia 264 & 160).
- Born: Denise Richards, American film (The World Is Not Enough) and TV actress (The Real Housewives of Beverly Hills); in Downers Grove, Illinois.

== February 18, 1971 (Thursday) ==
- Greek archaeologists in Jerusalem discovered the remains of the Church of the Holy Sepulchre, a Greek Orthodox basilica that had been built in the 4th century roughly 30 feet (9.1 m) from the Rock of Calvary, the traditional site of the crucifixion of Jesus Christ. The church had been consecrated on September 13, 335.
- U.S. President Nixon proposed his program for national health care, the National Health Strategy, to Congress. Under the Republican president's plan, all U.S. employers "ranging from giant corporations to the couple with a maid" would pay 65 percent of the health insurance premium for their employees starting on July 1, 1973, increasing to 75 percent by 1976.
- Born: Thomas Bjørn, Danish golfer, one of Scandinavia's most successful-ever golfers, with 15 wins on the PGA European Tour; in Silkeborg
- Died:
  - Chuck Hostetler, 67, American baseball player remembered as "baseball's oldest rookie" for making his Major League Baseball debut at the age of 40 for the Detroit Tigers in 1944
  - Afoafouvale Misimoa, 69, Western Samoan politician, and the Secretary-General of the South Pacific Commission

== February 19, 1971 (Friday) ==
- The U.S. Naval Undersea Warfare Center's Project Deep Ops, training pilot whales to retrieve submerged objects ran into a problem when "Ishmael" was released into the Pacific Ocean and used the opportunity to escape after three years in captivity. According to the final report on Project Deep Ops, "Ishamael was lost during an open-ocean training exercise. Several days were spent searching for him with surface craft and helicopters," without success. The whale's flight to freedom was aided by "a malfunctioning automatic direction finder system" that had been strapped to his back.
- The Canada/USSR Agreement on Co-operation in Fisheries in the Northeastern Pacific Ocean off the Coast of Canada, entered into force, allowing fishing vessels of the USSR to conduct fishing with trawls in specified areas between 3 and 12 miles of the territorial sea of Canada.
- The remains of Little Miss Lake Panasoffkee were discovered. She would remain unidentified until October 2025 when it was determined she was 21-year-old Maureen Rowan (née Minor).
- Born:
  - Jeff Kinney, American children's book writer known for the Diary of a Wimpy Kid series of books; in Fort Washington, Maryland
  - Gil Shaham, American-born Israeli violinist, in Urbana, Illinois

== February 20, 1971 (Saturday) ==
- The U.S. Emergency Broadcast System (EBS) sent an erroneous warning to all the nation's radio and television stations, meant to be a standard weekly test conducted by NORAD in Cheyenne Mountain in Colorado at 7:33 in the morning (9:33 a.m. Eastern time, 6:33 a.m. Pacific). Many stations didn't notice that the warning included the message authentication code word provided to all Federal Communications Commission (FCC) licensed stations on a quarterly basis. Those that did, and that verified the code word "hatefulness", broadcast the warning "This is not a test. A state of national emergency exists. This station will now go off the air. Please tune your dial to a station on the Emergency Broadcast System for a message from the President. This is not a test. This is not a test." Instructions were then given for how to locate the EBS station broadcast serving the area. Although the reason for the alert wasn't directly mentioned by announcers, the activation of the EBS for a nationwide emergency was normally reserved for a warning of an attack on the United States. All broadcast stations had heard the tone, followed by a teletype message with the authentication word that said "Message authenticator: Hatefulness – Hatefulness. This is an Emergency Action Notification (EAN) directed by the President. Normal broadcasting will cease immediately. All stations will broadcast EAN Message One preceded by the attention signal, per FCC rules. Only stations holding NDEA may stay on air in accord with their state EBS plan." Thirteen minutes later, news services informed broadcasters that a mistake had been made and that stations should disregard the order to go off the air, and the official cancel notice did not get sent until 10:30 Eastern time with the statement "Message authenticator: Impish- Impish. Cancel message sent at 09:33 EST. Repeat Cancel message sent at 09:33 EST." The mistake was traced to a long-time civilian employee of NORAD who mistakenly loaded the wrong tape when sending the message to all stations. He told reporters "I can't imagine how the hell I did it." The FCC later reported that a survey showed that only 8 percent of the nation's TV and radio stations went off of the air as directed by the alert; of the 92% that kept broadcasting, one-third said that they questioned whether the message was valid and another one-third didn't see the alert until after it had been canceled.

== February 21, 1971 (Sunday) ==
- Tornadoes killed 123 people as nineteen storms raged across the Deep South part of the United States, primarily in the state of Mississippi, but also in northeastern Louisiana and southern Tennessee. Hardest hit was the town of Inverness, Mississippi, with the black residential section destroyed.
- Pakistan's President, Agha Mohammed Yahya Khan, announced the firing of his 10-member cabinet of ministers, 11 days before the nation's 313-member National Assembly was to meet in Dacca in East Pakistan, which had more members than Yahya Khan's West Pakistan for the first time in history.
- The Convention on Psychotropic Substances was signed at Vienna at a conference attended by representatives of 71 nations. Under the agreement, which would become effective upon ratification by 40 nations, governments would maintain strict restrictions on four different classes of drugs and 32 identified substances, with the strictest controls over hallucinogens including LSD and mescaline.

== February 22, 1971 (Monday) ==
- Speaking about the Bengali minority in East Pakistan, the Republic of Pakistan's President, General Yahya Khan, said "Kill three million of them, and the rest will eat out of our hands." In the civil war that followed East Pakistan's declaration of independence, Yahya Khan's West Pakistan soldiers killed at least 26,000 Bengalis and perhaps as many as 100,000. The statement was recorded by journalist Robert Payne during an interview.

== February 23, 1971 (Tuesday) ==
- Malaysia's government established the MKN (Majlis Keselamatan Negara or Council of National Security), linking several agencies into one unit to maintain public order in the country and to strengthen national defense.
- Born: Melinda Messenger, English model, in Swindon
- Died:
  - Do Cao Tri, 41, South Vietnamese general, was killed in a helicopter crash in Tay Ninh Province, along with François Sully, 43, French war correspondent for Newsweek magazine, en route to take command of Operation Lam Son 719.
  - Ricardo J. Alfaro, 88, former President of Panama

== February 24, 1971 (Wednesday) ==
- The government of Algeria seized majority control (51 percent) of stock ownership in all French oil companies and nationalizing the natural gas pipelines and gasoline pipelines constructed by the companies.

== February 25, 1971 (Thursday) ==
- Vatican City ratified the nuclear non-proliferation treaty, pledging not to develop or deploy nuclear weapons, primarily as a sign of encouragement to other nations.
- The reactor of the Pickering Nuclear Generating Station, the first commercial nuclear power station in Canada, went critical, and would generate power for the first time on April 4.
- The U.S. Department of State issued its "Foreign Policy Report" to the public, noting that it wished to improve relations with mainland China, and referring to the nation for the first time as the People's Republic of China.
- Born:
  - Sean Astin, American actor, in Santa Monica, California, the son of actress Patty Duke; later adopted by Duke's husband, actor John Astin
  - Daniel Powter, Canadian singer and songwriter, in Vancouver, British Columbia
  - Sean O'Haire, American professional wrestler for WCW, WWF and WWE, later a kickboxer and a hair stylist; in Atlanta (committed suicide 2014)

== February 26, 1971 (Friday) ==
- Secretary General U Thant signed the United Nations proclamation of the March equinox (March 21, the first day of spring in the Northern Hemisphere and the first day of autumn in the Southern Hemisphere) as international Earth Day. Earth Day continues to be observed in the U.S. and much of the Western world on April 22, the date of the original 1970 movement.
- Eleven students and four police were killed in Cali, Colombia, in rioting that arose after students at the Universidad del Valle accused the university's president of misusing funds and then occupied the administration buildings.
- Per Borten, the Prime Minister of Norway, admitted that he had lied to investigators about disclosing confidential information to an opponent of Norway's application to the European Economic Community, prompting a demand by the opposition leader in the Stortinget, Trygve Bratteli, that Borten resign. Lawyer Arne Haugestad, the EEC opponent to whom Borten showed a confidential report from Norway's ambassador on February 15, then leaked the report to the Oslo newspaper Dagbladet, which published on February 19. Borten would step down and Bratteli would form a new government as prime minister on March 17.
- France and the United States signed an agreement confirming cooperation between the two nations in fighting the trafficking of narcotics. U.S. Attorney General John N. Mitchell and France's Minister of the Interior Raymond Marcellin concluded the agreement in Paris.

== February 27, 1971 (Saturday) ==
- The oil tanker ship SS Wafra ran aground at South Africa while being towed near Cape Agulhas and spilled 200,000 barrels of crude oil into the Indian Ocean and the Atlantic Ocean. Beaches between Cape Agulhas and Gansbaai before a tug pulled SS Wafra from the reef on March 8 and towed it away 200 miles (320 km) from the coast.
- The first legal abortion clinic in the Netherlands, the Mildredhuis in Arnhem, began performing abortions of pregnancy.
- Comet Bennett, discovered on December 28, 1969, by astronomer John Caister Bennett, was seen for the last time from Earth, with the final photo taken by astronomer Elizabeth Roemer. With an orbital period of 1,678 years, it will not be seen again until the year 3647.
- Born:
  - Sara Blakely, American businesswoman and philanthropist who founded the company Spanx; in Clearwater, Florida
  - Derren Brown, English stage magician and Broadway theatre performer; in Croydon, London
- Died:
  - Oscar Serlin, 70, Russian-born U.S. theater producer known for Life with Father, which remains the longest-running non-musical play on Broadway, with 3,224 performances from 1939 to 1947. Serlin's record for longest-running Broadway play would stand until 1972, when exceeded by the 3,225th performance of Fiddler on the Roof in 1972.
  - Ramón Lamoneda, 78, Spanish politician and the first general secretary of the Spanish Socialist Workers' Party

== February 28, 1971 (Sunday) ==
- Male voters in the tiny European principality of Liechtenstein participated in a referendum on whether to allow women to vote and rejected women's suffrage by a margin of 80 votes (1,897 against and 1,817 for), leaving Liechtenstein as "the only area in the Western world where women cannot vote".
- Jack Nicklaus won the 1971 PGA Championship, becoming the first person to win each of the world's four major golfing tournaments (the Masters, the British Open, the U.S. Open and the PGA title) more than once. Nicklaus finished two strokes ahead of Billy Casper on 72 holes (281 to 283) for the $40,000 first place purse.
- Motorcycle stuntman Evel Knievel set a world record by jumping over 19 cars prior to the beginning of the 1971 Miller High Life 500 stock car race in Ontario, California. Robert Knievel, "extending by one his own world record, for which there are no challengers" commented to reporters afterward that he had been helped by the fact that the 19 automobiles were all "small cars— Dodge Colts. Maybe if Dodge starts making 'em smaller I'll try for 20."
- Born: Snow Knight, English thoroughbred racehorse and Epsom Derby winner of 1974, foaled at Makeney, Derbyshire (d. 1992)
