= Jarosław Wasik =

Polish singer-songwriter (born 1971)

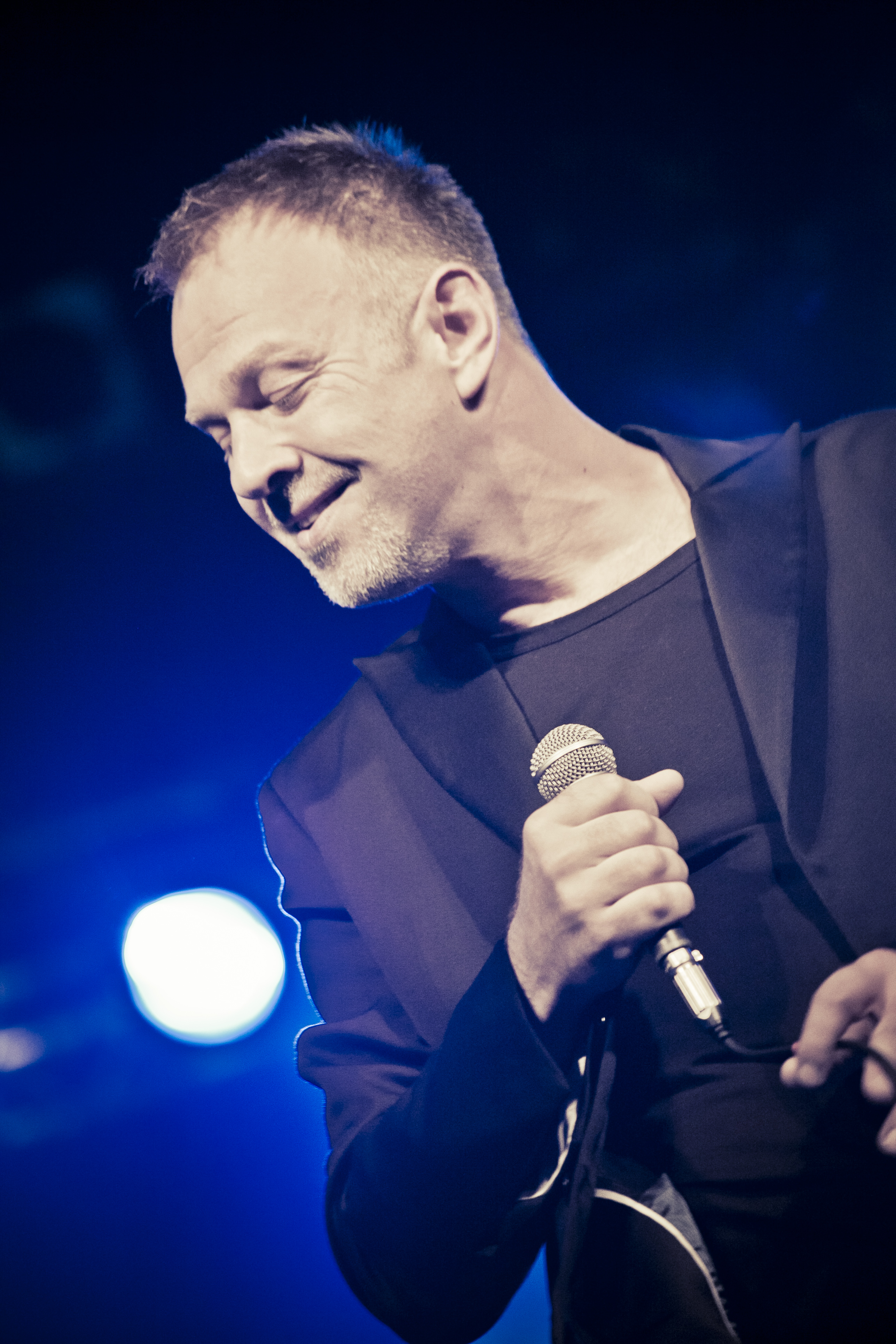

Background information
- Born: 1 January 1971 (age 54); Prudnik
- Genres: sung poetry; pop music; rock
- Occupation: singer-songwriter
- Instrument: vocals
- Years active: 1990–present
- Labels: InterSonus Music; Agencja Artystyczna MTJ
- Website: www.jaroslawwasik.pl

Jarosław Wasik (born 1 January 1971 in Prudnik) is a Polish singer-songwriter.

He was educated at the University of Opole and SWPS University of Social Sciences and Humanities in Warsaw. He is currently a director at the Muzeum Polskiej Piosenki in Opole.

== Discography ==
=== Monographic albums ===
- Nastroje (1995)
- Zielony z niebieskim (1997)
- Fabryka Nastrojów (2004)
- Nie dotykaj (13 September 2011)

=== Singles ===
- Po Prostu Pragnę (1997)

=== Compilation albums ===
- Cytryna
- Ballady Ani Niesobskiej do muzyki przyjaciół
- 13 poetów (2003)
- Upodobania (2004)
- Miłosne smaki Warszawy (2006)
- Christmas Time – All About Music (16 December 2009)
- W stronę Krainy Łagodności (11 September 2009, 4 July 2011)
- Smooth Jazz Po Polsku (21 April 2010)
- Między ciszą a ciszą 2 (9 October 2012)
- 40/40 Ogólnopolskie Spotkania Zamkowe Śpiewajmy Poezję – Wydanie Jubileuszowe (2015)
- Ballady i niuanse. Volume 2 (11 December 2015)
- Między ciszą a ciszą 3 (1 June 2018)
