= SS Letchworth (1942) =

Cargo ship built in England in 1942

History
- Name: Empire Caxton (1942-45); Letchworth (1945-56); Peterland (1956-59); Pamit (1959-62); Christos (1962-67)
- Owner: Ministry of War Transport (1942-45); Watergate Steamship Co Ltd (1945-56); Sagaland Ltd (1956-59); Padre Compagnia Navigazione SA (1959-62); Solmare Compagnia Maritime SA (1962-67)
- Operator: Martyn, Martyn & Co Ltd (1942-45); R S Dalgleish Ltd (1945-56); Buries, Markes Ltd (1956-59); A Halcoussis & Co (1959-62); T Samourkas (1962-67)
- Port of registry: (United Kingdom) West Hartlepool (1942-45); (United Kingdom) Newcastle upon Tyne (1945-59); Greece (1959-62); (Liberia) Monrovia (1962-71)
- Builder: William Gray & Co. Ltd.
- Launched: 31 March 1942
- Completed: May 1942
- Out of service: 31 March 1967
- Identification: Code Letters BDVW (1942-59); UK Official Number 168940 (1942-59)
- Fate: Sank, 1 April 1967.

General characteristics
- Tonnage: 2,873 GRT; 1,698 NRT
- Length: 315 ft 4 in (96.11 m)
- Beam: 46 ft 5 in (14.15 m)
- Depth: 23 ft 0 in (7.01 m)
- Installed power: Triple expansion steam engine
- Propulsion: Screw propeller

Location of the sinking of Christos.

Letchworth was a 2,873 GRT cargo ship which was built in 1942 for the Ministry of War Transport (MoWT) as Empire Caxton. In 1945 she was sold and renamed Letchworth. In 1956 she was sold and renamed Peterland. In 1959, she was sold to Greece and renamed Pamit, being renamed Christos when sold again in 1962. She served until 1967 when she ran aground and then sank.

== Description ==
The ship was built by William Gray & Co. Ltd., West Hartlepool. She was launched on 31 March 1942 and completed in May.

The ship was 315 feet 4 inches (96.11 m) long, with a beam of 46 feet 5 inches (14.15 m) and a depth of 23 feet 0 inches (7.01 m). She had a GRT of 2,873 and a NRT of 1,693.

She was propelled by a triple expansion steam engine, which had cylinders of 20 inches (51 cm), 31 inches (79 cm) and 55 inches (140 cm) diameter by 55 inches (140 cm) stroke. The engine was built by the Central Marine Engine Works, West Hartlepool.

== History ==
Empire Caxton was built for the MoWT. She was placed under the management of Martyn, Martyn & Co Ltd. She was allocated the United Kingdom Official Number 168940. The Code Letters BDVW were allocated and her port of registry was West Hartlepool.

Empire Caxton was a member of a number of convoys during the Second World War.

SC 141

Convoy SC 141 departed Halifax, Nova Scotia on 3 September 1943 and arrived at Liverpool on 17 September. Empire Cavalier was carrying a cargo of steel and pit props and was bound for the Tyne.

MKS 64

Convoy MKS 64 departed from Alexandria, Egypt on 7 October 1944 bound for the United Kingdom. Empire Caxton joined the convoy at Augusta, Italy and left it at Gibraltar.

MKS 65G

Convoy MKS 65G departed Gibraltar on 29 October 1944 bound for the United Kingdom. Empire Caxton was carrying a cargo of iron ore.

MKS 73G

Convoy MKS 73G departed Gibraltar on 26 December 1944 bound for the United Kingdom. Empire Caxton was carrying a cargo of iron ore.

MKS 87G

Convoy MKS 87G departed Casablanca, Morocco on 6 March 1945 bound for the United Kingdom. Empire Caxton was carrying a cargo of iron ore.

MKS 100G

Convoy MKS 100G joined convoy OS 128 on 15 May 1945. Empire Caxton was carrying a cargo of iron ore.

In 1945, Empire Caxton was sold to the Watergate Steamship Co Ltd, Newcastle upon Tyne and was renamed Letchworth. She was placed under the management of R S Dalgleish Ltd, Newcastle upon Tyne. Her port of registry was changed to Newcastle upon Tyne. In 1956, Letchworth was sold to Sagaland Ltd and was renamed Peterland. She was operated under the management of Buries, Markes LTd. In 1959, Peterland was sold to Padre Compagnia Navigazione SA, Greece and renamed Pamit. She was operated under the management of A Halcoussis & Co.

In 1962, Pamit was sold to Solmare Compania Maritima SA and was renamed Christos. She was reflagged to Liberia. Christos was operated under the management on T Samourkas, Greece. On 31 March 1967, she ran aground on Kandeliusa Island, near Kos. Although she was refloated the next day, Christos developed a number of leaks and sank at 36°32′N 26°57′E.
