= MV Ricardo Manuel =

Coaster built 1940

History
- Name: Empire Cliff (1940-45); Marna (1945-60); Harcliff (1960-63); Ricardo Manuel (1960-71)
- Owner: Ministry of War Transport (1940-45); South Georgia Co Ltd (1945-60); Hargreaves Coal & Shipping Co Ltd (1960-63); Comonave Cia de Portuguesa de Navegação Ltda (1963-71)
- Operator: F T Everard & Co Ltd (1940-45); Christian Salvesen & Co Ltd (1945-60); Hargreaves Coal & Shipping Co Ltd (1960-63); Componave Cia de Portuguesa de Navegação Ltda (1963-71)
- Port of registry: (United Kingdom) Goole (1940-45); (United Kingdom) Leith (1945-60); (United Kingdom) London (1960-63); Panama City (1963-71)
- Builder: Goole Shipbuilding & Repairing Co Ltd
- Launched: 16 October 1940
- Completed: December 1940
- Out of service: 4 September 1971
- Identification: Code Letters MLPK (1940-63); United Kingdom Official Number 164908 (1940-63)
- Fate: Sank

General characteristics
- Type: Cargo ship
- Tonnage: 873 GRT; 459 NRT
- Length: 197 ft 7 in (60.22 m)
- Beam: 30 ft 2 in (9.19 m)
- Depth: 11 ft 6 in (3.51 m)
- Installed power: 2SCSA diesel engine
- Propulsion: Screw propeller

Ricardor Manuel was an 873 GRT coaster which was built in 1940 by Goole Shipbuilding & Repairing Co Ltd, Goole as Empire Cliff for the Ministry of War Transport (MoWT). In 1945 she was sold and renamed Marna. A further sale in 1960 saw her renamed Harcliff. In 1963, she was sold to a Panamanian company and renamed Ricardo Manuel. She sank in 1971 after a collision with another ship at the entrance to Casablanca harbour, Morocco.

== Description ==
The ship was built by Goole Shipbuilding & Repairing Co Ltd, Goole as yard number 357. She was launched on 16 October 1940 and completed in December.

The ship was 197 feet 7 inches (60.22 m) long, with a beam of 30 feet 2 inches (9.19 m) and a depth of 11 feet 6 inches (3.51 m). She had a GRT of 873 and a NRT of 459.

The ship was propelled by a 2-stroke Single Cycle Double Acting diesel engine, which had seven cylinders of 9 13/16 inches (24.9 cm) diameter by 16 5/16 inches (41.4 cm) stroke. The engine was built by British Auxiliaries Ltd, Glasgow.

== History ==
Empire Cliff was built for the MoWT. She was placed under the management of F T Everard & Co Ltd. Her port of registry was Goole. The Code Letters MLPK and United Kingdom Official Number 164908 were allocated. In 1946, Empire Cliff was sold to The South Georgia Co Ltd. She was renamed Marna, placed under the management of Christian Salvesen & Co Ltd and her port of registry was changed to Leith. In 1960, Marna was sold to Hargreaves Coal & Shipping Co Ltd, London and was renamed Harcliff.

In 1963, Harcliff was sold to Comonave Cia de Portuguesa de Navegação Ltda, Panama and was renamed Ricardo Manuel. On 4 September 1971, Ricardo Manuel was in collision with the Moroccan registered MV Zagora in foggy conditions at the entrance to Casablanca harbour. She was cut in two and sunk. Ricardo Manuel was inbound to Casablanca from Lisbon, Portugal.
