= April 1971 =

Month of 1971

<<	April 1971					>>
Su	Mo	Tu	We	Th	Fr	Sa
				1	2	3
4	5	6	7	8	9	10
11	12	13	14	15	16	17
18	19	20	21	22	23	24
25	26	27	28	29	30

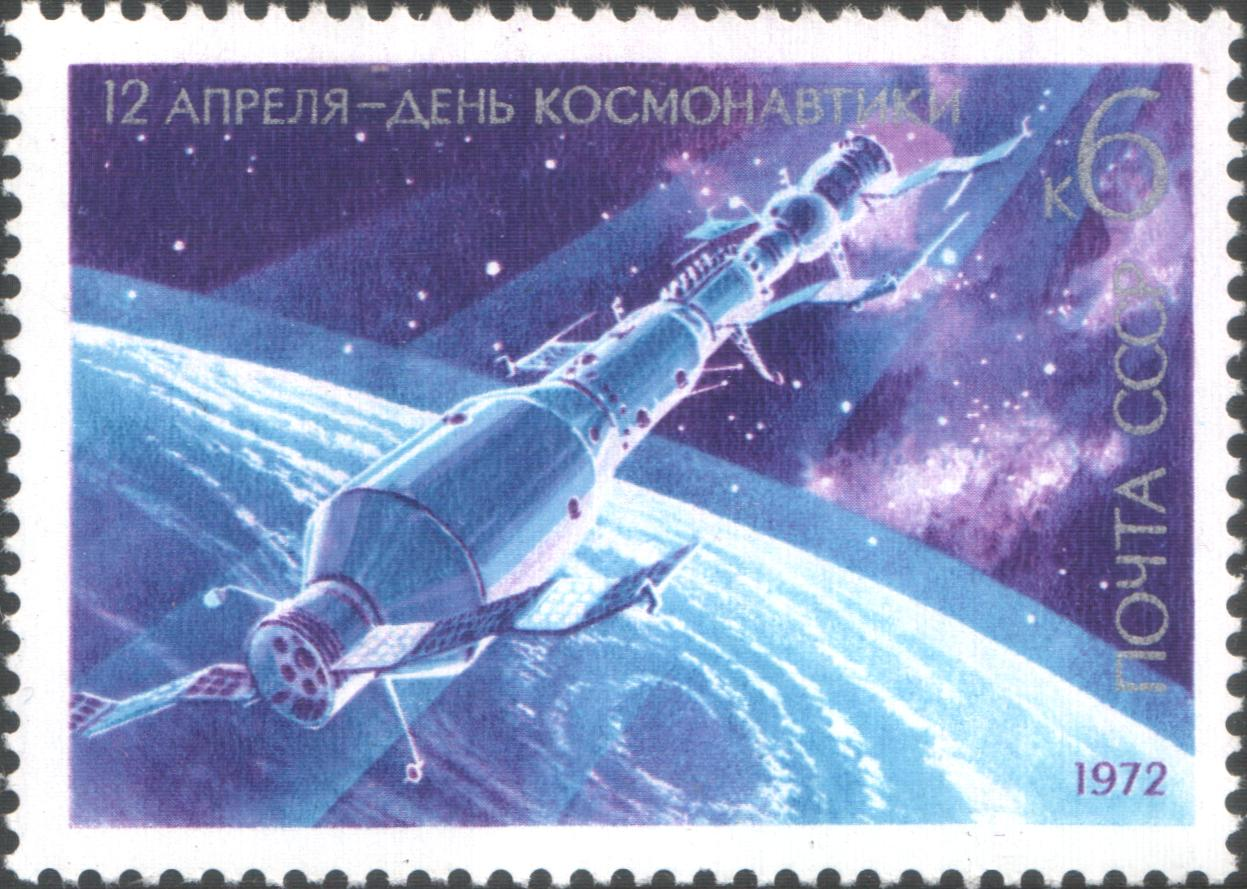
April 19, 1971: The Earth's first space station, Salyut 1, is launched into orbit by the Soviet Union

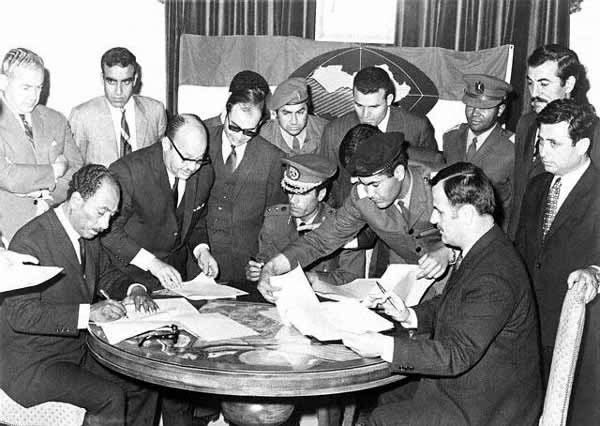
April 18, 1971: Sadat, Gaddafi and Assad pledge to merge Egypt, Libya and Syria into "Federation of Arab Republics"

The following events occurred in April 1971:

== April 1, 1971 (Thursday) ==
- The United Kingdom lifted all restrictions on gold ownership with the Exchange Control (Gold Coins Exemption) Order 1971.
- The postal code used in Canada was started with a test in Ottawa, with plans to introduce it in Manitoba in the autumn, Saskatchewan in the spring of 1972, and other provinces between 1972 and 1974.
- The day after U.S. Army Second Lieutenant William Calley was sentenced to life in prison in his court-martial for 22 murders, he was transferred from prison to house arrest by order of U.S. President Richard M. Nixon.
- An attempted coup d'état in Ecuador ended only hours after it started, without any violence. The night before, Army General Luis Jacome Chavez and about 50 Ecuadorian War Academy officers several disgruntled soldiers announced that they were commencing a revolt against President José Velasco Ibarra and his nephew, Defense Minister Jorge Acosta Velasco. Acosta's assistant announced on Thursday morning that Jacome had surrendered.
- The city of Bizen was founded in the Okayama Prefecture of Japan. As of 2017, it had a population of almost 36,000 people.
- Born:
  - Danielle Smith, Canadian politician, Premier of Alberta, in Calgary
  - Jessica Collins, American TV actress, as Jennifer Lynn Campogna in Schenectady, New York

== April 2, 1971 (Friday) ==
- The Tripoli Agreement was signed in the Libyan city of Tripoli by representatives of oil companies from around the world and by oil ministers of OPEC (the Organization of the Petroleum Exporting Countries), providing for higher prices to be paid to OPEC nations for petroleum until 1976.
- The cult classic U.S. TV soap opera Dark Shadows broadcast its 1,226th and final episode.
- Born: Todd Woodbridge, Australian professional tennis player and half of the Grand Slam doubles winning team of Woodbridge and Woodforde (11 titles), and Woodbridge and Bjorkman (5 titles); in Sydney

== April 3, 1971 (Saturday) ==
- Tajuddin Ahmad, the General Secretary of the Awami League and a leader of the independence movement for the Bengali population of East Pakistan, met with India's Prime Minister Indira Gandhi to seek Indian aid in the fight for Bangladesh's liberation from Pakistan.
- Un banc, un arbre, une rue, sung by Séverine (music by Jean-Pierre Bourtayre, lyrics by Yves Dessca), won the Eurovision Song Contest 1971 for Monaco.
- Born: Picabo Street, American skier and celebrity, 1998 Olympic gold medalist; in Triumph, Idaho
- Died:
  - Jacques Ochs, 88, Belgian artist and Olympic fencing champion
  - Joe Valachi, 66, American gangster who became a government witness who testified in detail before Congress about the inner workings of the American Mafia, died of a heart attack while serving a prison sentence.

== April 4, 1971 (Sunday) ==
- Kosmos 404 was launched by the USSR as an ASAT test. Its target was Kosmos 400, which it intercepted and destroyed.
- The Mukti Bahini, a guerrilla force of East Pakistanis and the predecessor of the Bangladesh Armed Forces, was organized under the command of General M. A. G. Osmani, a retired Pakistan Army officer, from units of Pakistan's East Bengal Regiment and the East Pakistan Rifles, joined by civilians who volunteered to serve in the "People's Army" the Gonobahini.
- Died:
  - Carl Mays, 79, American baseball player who infamously beaned Ray Chapman with a pitched ball in 1920, resulting in his death the following day.
  - Victor Odlum, 90, Canadian journalist, soldier, and diplomat

== April 5, 1971 (Monday) ==
- In Ceylon (now Sri Lanka), the Marxist–Leninist group Janatha Vimukthi Peramuna (People's Liberation Front) began a rebellion against the government of Prime Minister Sirimavo Bandaranaike, starting with plans for a simultaneous surprise attack on police stations nationwide at 11:00 at night and a plot to kidnap Bandaranaike from her residence. Because of a failure to attend a planning meeting on April 2, and a misunderstanding of a specific time for the uprising to start, a unit assigned to assault the police station at Wellawaya launched its attack on the morning of April 5 and ruined the JVP's plan to catch the rest of Ceylon's police off guard.
- Frances Phipps became the first woman to travel to the North Pole as she and her husband Welland Phipps, co-owners of the Atlas Aviation charter service, flew a Twin Otter ski plane to install a radar beacon at the Pole.
- A major eruption of Mount Etna in Sicily began. In the course of the eruption, lava buried the Etna Observatory (built in the late 19th century), destroyed the first generation of the Etna cable-car, and seriously threatened several small villages on Etna's east flank.
- The Marxist government of Chile and the Communist government of East Germany established diplomatic relations.
- Yu Song-gun, a diplomat of South Korea's Embassy in West Germany, was kidnapped by North Korean agents while he and his wife were visiting West Berlin.
- Robert M. Blais was sworn into office as the mayor of tiny Lake George Village, New York, and would celebrate half a century in office in 2021. Blais retired in 2023 after more than 52 years in office.

== April 6, 1971 (Tuesday) ==
- "Ping-pong diplomacy" began when the People's Republic of China sent an invitation to the U.S. national table tennis team to visit as the first Americans to be invited to mainland China since the Communist government had taken over in 1949. For more than 20 years, mainland China had been closed to the U.S. and other Western nations. The American team was in Nagoya, Japan for the world championships at the same time that the People's Republic was participating in the competition for the first time since 1965. Earlier, Glenn Cowan of the U.S. team was befriended by three-time men's world champion Zhuang Zedong of China and the press coverage led to the invitation. Rufford Harrison, the captain of the U.S. team accepted the invitation on behalf of the team the next day.
- West Germany's Chancellor, Willy Brandt, wrote to French President Georges Pompidou to reiterate his determination to re-open negotiations for the United Kingdom to join the European Community.
- Born: Lou Merloni, American baseball player and radio personality, in Framingham, Massachusetts
- Died: Igor Stravinsky, 88, Russian composer, conductor and pianist

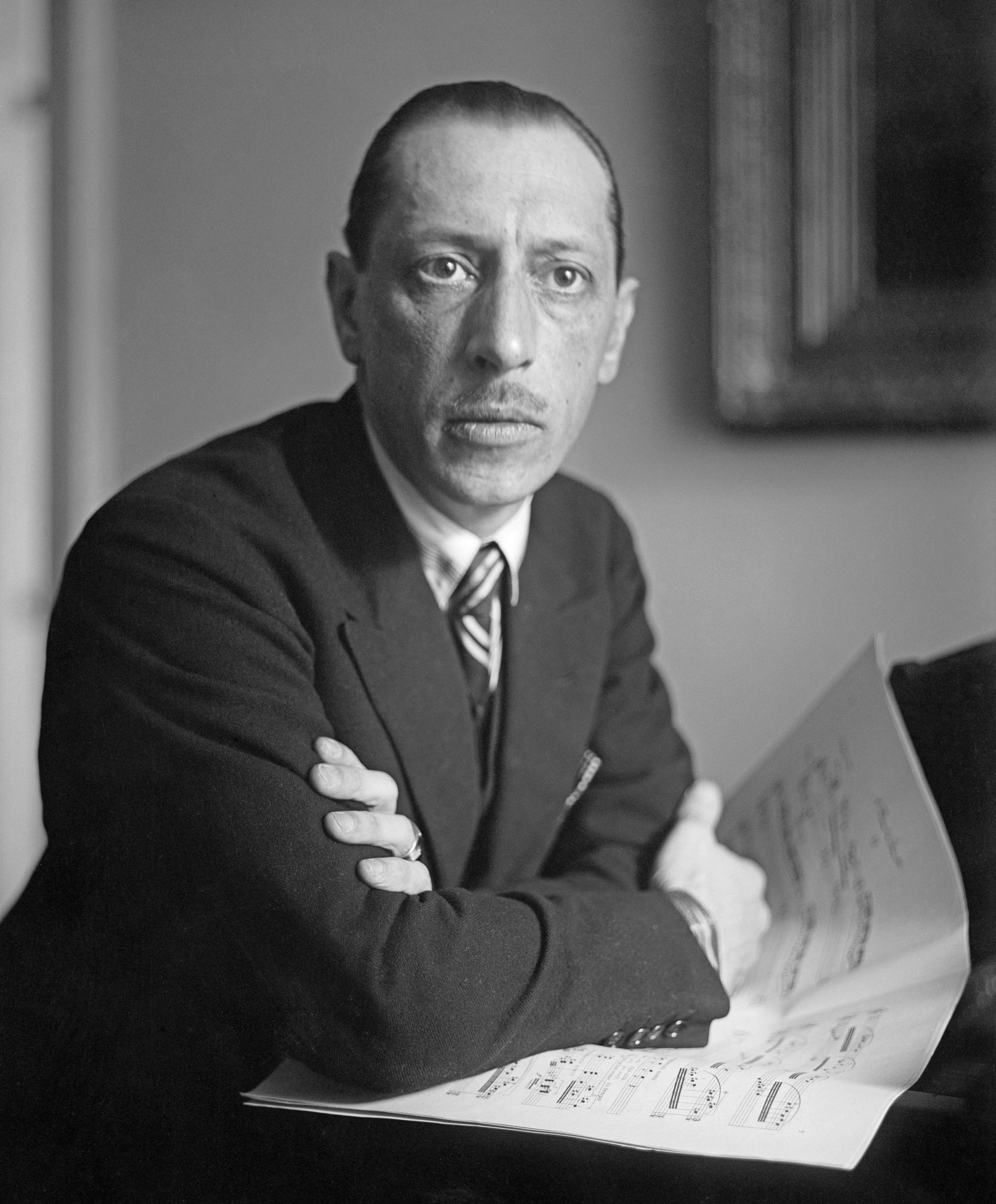
Stravinsky

== April 7, 1971 (Wednesday) ==
- Two Croatian nationalists invaded the Yugoslavian Embassy in Stockholm and took Ambassador to Sweden Vladimir Rolović hostage, then tortured him and shot him. Stockholm police stormed the building after being called to the scene and arrested the two men, Miro Barešić and Anđelko Brajković, at the scene. Rolović died eight days later. Barešić and Brajković would be released 17 months later after the hijacking of SAS Flight 130.
- U.S. President Richard M. Nixon announced in a nationally televised speech that he had scheduled the withdrawal of 100,000 additional U.S. troops from South Vietnam by December 1, with 14,300 to return home each month. At the time, there were 284,000 U.S. troops still participating in the Vietnam War.
- Archbishop Meliktu Jenbere was elected as the second Patriarch of the Ethiopian Orthodox Tewahido Church, succeeding the late Abuna Basilios, who had died on October 13. He was enthroned as Patriarch Abuna Theophilos on May 9 and would reign until 1979.
- For the last time in Major League Baseball history, the Opening Day was a doubleheader. With the Oakland A's hosting the visiting Chicago White Sox, winning 6 to 5 and 12 to 4.
- Born: Guillaume Depardieu (d. 2008), French actor, son of Gérard Depardieu and Élisabeth Depardieu, in Paris

== April 8, 1971 (Thursday) ==
- The first legalized off-track betting system in the United States began operating in the state of New York at a terminal in Grand Central Station in New York City, for betting on horse races at Roosevelt Raceway.
- A bomb exploded in a Saigon club where the CBC band was performing, killing a GI and a female civilian, the drummer's girlfriend.
- The "Hughes 500-P", a modified Hughes OH-6 Cayuse chopper billed as "the quietest helicopter ever", because of its noise dampening technology and black paint that absorbed radar waves, was given its first public demonstration.
- The championship game of the Europe's FIBA European Champions Cup was held in Antwerp in Belgium. The league champions of 24 nations participated, and in the final, the Soviet Army team, CSKA Moscow, defeated Italy's Ignis Varese, 67 to 53.

== April 9, 1971 (Friday) ==
- The Politburo of the Communist Party of the Soviet Union was enlarged from 11 members to 15 as the Central Committee voted to approve the promotion of four men to full Politburo status. Dinmukhamed A. Kunayev, Vladimir V. Scherbitsky and Viktor V. Grishin were promoted from candidate members to full members, and the CPSU's secretary in charge of agriculture Fyodor D. Kulakov was added to the group that held the de facto power in the U.S.S.R., while the original 11 were elected to new terms. Party General Secretary Leonid I. Brezhnev was re-elected as the CPSU General Secretary.
- Troops of the Pakistan Army invaded the home of Zakir Husain, a native Bengali and a former Governor of East Pakistan, killing most of his staff. Husain himself and his eldest son were almost executed on the scene until the unit's commanding officer realized what was happening and stopped the act.
- Born: Jacques Villeneuve, Canadian racing driver, 1995 CART World Series champ, 1995 Indianapolis 500 winner and 1997 Formula One world champion; in Saint-Jean-sur-Richelieu, Quebec

== April 10, 1971 (Saturday) ==
- Sixteen members of the U.S. national table tennis team became the first contingent of Americans in more than 20 years to be welcomed to the People's Republic of China as nine players, four team officials and two wives walked across a bridge from British Hong Kong at the invitation of the Chinese government for an eight-day visit described as ping-pong diplomacy. The team and accompanying reporters were flown from Guangzhou to Tokyo seven days later after their historic visit.
- A provisional Bangladeshi government took its oath of office in Meherpur Kushtia.

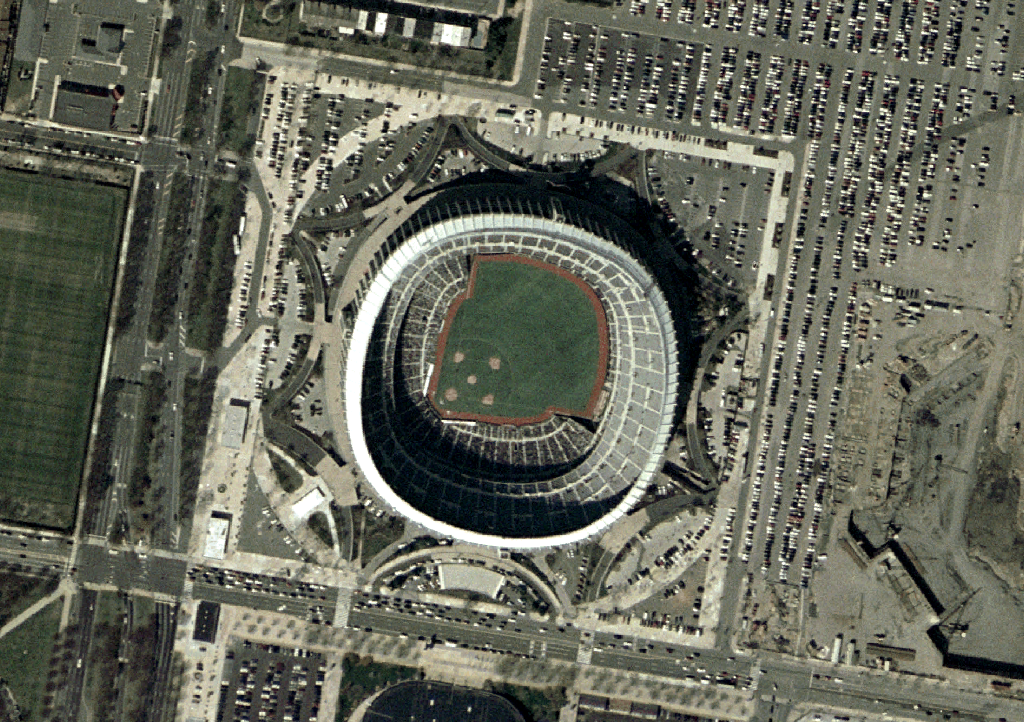
Veterans Stadium in Philadelphia

- Veterans Stadium in Philadelphia, opened with the home team, the Phillies, defeating the Montreal Expos 4–1, in front of a crowd of 55,352. The first ball was dropped by helicopter to Mike Ryan.

== April 11, 1971 (Sunday) ==
- An asteroid estimated to be 650 feet (200 m) in diameter, 2002 JE_{9}, passed within 140,000 miles (230,000 km) of Earth with a minimum miss distance of 0.20 LD, closer than the Moon (360,000 miles (580,000 km) at its perigee). The near-Earth asteroid is small enough that it would not be discovered until 21 years later by the Lincoln Near-Earth Asteroid Research (LINEAR) telescopic observatory.
- Charles Coody won golf's Masters Tournament by two strokes over Johnny Miller and Jack Nicklaus. Going into the final round, Coody and Nicklaus had been tied with a score of 209 but Cody shot a final round if 70 to Nicklaus's 72 to win by two strokes at Augusta National Golf Club.
- Elections were held in North Vietnam on a choice from 529 candidates of the Vietnamese Fatherland Front for the 420-member National Assembly of Vietnam (Quoc Hoi Viet Nam).

== April 12, 1971 (Monday) ==
- Elizabeth Hazelhurst, a 21-year-old US student from Flagstaff, Arizona, fell about 350 feet (110 m) to her death from the edge of Mojave Point during a visit to Grand Canyon National Park. She and three friends had climbed over a safety railing in order to have a picnic on a rock ledge overlooking the Canyon.
- Palestinians retreated from Amman to the north of Jordan.
- Born: Shannen Doherty, American TV and film actor best known for starring in Beverly Hills, 90210; in Memphis, Tennessee(died of cancer, 2024)
- Died: Igor Tamm, 75, Russian physicist and Nobel Prize laureate

== April 13, 1971 (Tuesday) ==
- American chemists Patsy O'Connell Sherman and her co-worker, Samuel Smith, and the 3M company was awarded U.S. Patent No. 3,574,791 for their invention, "Block and graft co-polymers containing water-solvatable polar groups and fluoroaliphatic groups", now a stain repellent marketed by 3M as Scotchguard.

== April 14, 1971 (Wednesday) ==
- A new constitution for the British-administered Gilbert and Ellice Islands went into effect, granting the South Pacific archipelago almost complete self-government on domestic affairs. The United Kingdom still made decisions regarding the Islands' defense and security, but the new law required the British Resident Commissioner (at the time, Sir John Field) to obtain the consent of an elected legislature on most matters as the territory's Governor. The new constitution also removed the Islands from the jurisdiction of the British High Commissioner for the Western Pacific, Sir Michael Gass. The Gilbert Islands would later become the nation of Kiribati and the Ellice Islands would become the nation of Tuvalu.
- U.S. President Nixon announced that the nation would relax a 20-year-old embargo that had existed against trade with the People's Republic of China.
- Djoudj National Bird Sanctuary was established in Senegal.

== April 15, 1971 (Thursday) ==
- All forty people on board a Philippine Air Force C-47 transport were killed when the plane crashed shortly after takeoff from Cesar Basa Air Base at Floridablanca for a flight to Nichols Air Field at Manila. The plane was transporting Philippine Air Force officers and their families. A 3-year-old child survived the crash but died later at a hospital.
- The revised writing system of the Malayalam language of India went into effect for all government publications in the state of Kerala, reducing its 1,000 characters to 57 (42 consonants and 15 vowels). The effective date was the first day of the Kerala New Year on the Malayalam Calendar, the 1st of Metam 1146 at that time.
- Sergei Anokhin, a Russian test pilot in training to become a cosmonaut, was injured in the crash of a Tupolev Tu-16 into the Aral Sea while the bomber was flying parabolas for zero-G tests of the engine of the Molniya Block L upper stage, to study why the stage was continually failing to restart in earth orbit.
- The U.S. fishing vessel Lynda K was lost in the Gulf of Alaska somewhere between Homer and Seward, Alaska.
- Born: Finidi George, Nigerian soccer player, in Port Harcourt
- Died:
  - Vladimir Rolović, 54, Yugoslavia's Ambassador to Sweden, died eight days after being shot by Croatian terrorists.
  - Friedebert Tuglas, 85, Estonian writer and Soviet dissident

== April 16, 1971 (Friday) ==
- Computer scientist Abhay Bhushan wrote RFC 354, the first File Transfer Protocol for ARPANET, the U.S. Department of Defense computer communication network that was the predecessor to the Internet.
- Born:
  - Natasha Zvereva, Soviet Belarusian tennis player, in Minsk, Byelorussian SSR, Soviet Union
  - Selena Quintanilla-Pérez, Mexican-American singer known as the "Queen of Tejano Music"; in Lake Jackson, Texas (murdered 1995)

== April 17, 1971 (Saturday) ==
- The People's Republic of Bangladesh was declared by Sheikh Mujibur Rahman, at Baidyanathtala, a city on the border with India, where the leaders of the rebellion had relocated. A provisional government for Bangladesh was sworn in, with Mujibur as the first President and Tajuddin Ahmad as the first Prime Minister. A legislature, the Constituent Assembly of Bangladesh, was created with many of the East Pakistan politicians who had been elected to the Pakistan National Assembly that had been canceled in March before it could meet. Baidyanathtala would later be renamed Mujibnagar in honor of Mujibur Rahman.
- In the Belgian general election, the Belgian Socialist Party won most seats but not an overall majority. Gaston Eyskens of the Christian Social Party remained Prime Minister.
- Rhodesia's special forces unit carried out Operation Panga with 10 commandos who invaded neighboring Zambia to raid a base of the rebel Zimbabwe People's Revolutionary Army (ZiRPA).
- Died: John Francis Gillespie, 24, Australian serviceman, killed in South Vietnam's Phuoc Tuy province during an attempted rescue. His remains would be located almost 33 years later and, after identification in 2007, returned to Australia.

== April 18, 1971 (Sunday) ==
- An agreement to create the Federation of Arab Republics was signed in Tripoli by Presidents Muammar Gaddafi of Libya, Anwar Sadat of Egypt and Hafez al-Assad of Syria. All three nations would ratify the agreement in referendums conducted on September 1, but the parties were never able to agree on terms of a merger.
- The German film distributor Filmverlag der Autoren was formed by 13 independent filmmakers meeting in Munich, West Germany.
- The U.S. restaurant chain Burger King sold its first franchise in Australia, to entrepreneur Jack Cowin. In that the name "Burger King" was already trademarked to a set of food stores based in Adelaide, the BK chain's fast-food restaurants in Australia are branded Hungry Jack's. Cowin's Hungry Jack's restaurant opened on June 19 in Perth.
- The Point Danger Light, the first lighthouse to use a laser to power its illumination, went into operation. The experiment would be abandoned in 1975 and the laser replaced by a standard electric lamp.
- Born: David Tennant, Scottish television actor and the 10th person to play the title character in Doctor Who; as David John McDonald in Bathgate, West Lothian

== April 19, 1971 (Monday) ==
- The first space station in Earth's history, Salyut 1, was launched by the Soviet Union from Baikonur at 6:40 in the morning local time (0140 UTC). On June 7, the crew of the ill-fated Soyuz 11 mission would be the first humans to enter a space station, staying until their disastrous return on June 30. Salyut 1 would remain in orbit until October 11.
- Sierra Leone, governed for the first ten years of its existence by a Prime Minister and a Governor-General representing the Queen of the United Kingdom, became a republic governed by a president. Christopher Okoro Cole, the Governor-General since March 31, briefly continued as the Sierra Leonean head of state until Siaka Stevens took office two days later.
- Judge Charles H. Older followed the March 29 sentencing recommendation of a jury and sentenced all four defendants in the Tate–LaBianca murders — Charles Manson, Susan Atkins, Patricia Krenwinkel and Leslie Van Houten — to execution. The U.S. Supreme Court would find the death penalty to be unconstitutional and the four defendants' sentences would be reduced to life imprisonment.
- Died: Niclas y Glais (pen name for Thomas Evan Nicholas), 91, Welsh poet

== April 20, 1971 (Tuesday) ==
- The Supreme Court of the United States ruled unanimously, in Swann v. Charlotte-Mecklenburg Board of Education, that busing of students could be ordered to achieve racial desegregation.
- In Cambodia, renamed the Khmer Republic after the March 1970 coup d'état that overthrew the monarchy, Lieutenant General Lon Nol resigned as Prime Minister, two months after suffering a stroke. He and his cabinet were asked by the nominal head of state, Cheng Heng, to remain until a new Premier could be chosen in elections. Lon transmitted his resignation letter to the nominal head of state, Cheng Heng. After a 13-day search in which nobody was willing to assume the office in the war-torn republic, Lon Nol agreed on May 3 to continue as the nominal Prime Minister with Lieutenant General Sisowath Sirik Matak would exercise most of the executive power.
- Died: Cecil Parker, 73, English actor

== April 21, 1971 (Wednesday) ==
- Prime Minister Siaka Stevens of Sierra Leone was inaugurated as the first president of the West African nation as the new constitution was ratified by the parliament.
- Herbert Choy, the American-born son of Korean parents, was confirmed by the U.S. Senate as the first federal judge of Asian descent. Choy would serve as a judge of the U.S. Ninth Circuit Court of Appeals until his death in 2004.
- In its first decision on a law against abortion, United States v. Vuitch, the U.S. Supreme Court upheld, by a margin of 5 to 2, the constitutionality of a District of Columbia statute that outlawed all abortions except for those performed by a physicians when "necessary for the preservation of the mother's life or health". Justice Hugo L. Black, writing for the majority set the precedent that in prosecution of an abortion, a government had the burden of proving that the healthy of the mother was not in danger and that in considering the mother's health, a physician could consider "psychological as well as physical well-being" of the mother, even if she had no previous history of mental defects.
- The Bank of France, the nation's central bank, announced that the portrait of Napoleon Bonaparte would no longer be on French currency and that the 100-franc note bearing his picture would no longer be considered legal tender except to be exchanged for the new 100-franc note, bearing the portrait of playwright Pierre Corneille.
- In the United States, a hijacker commandeered Eastern Airlines Flight 403, flying from Newark, New Jersey, to Miami, Florida, with 59 people on board and demanded to be flown to Italy.
- The Stork, a British naval hydrographic survey launch, attached to the survey ship HMS Hecate, was towed out to sea, bombed, and sunk in the Atlantic Ocean off Baltimore, Ireland, by a Provisional Irish Republican Army unit.
- Died: François Duvalier ("Papa Doc"), 64, President of Haiti.

== April 22, 1971 (Thursday) ==
- Jean-Claude Duvalier became the youngest president of a sovereign nation and the only teenager to be sworn in as a president. Duvalier, 19 years old, was inaugurated as President of Haiti the day after the death of his father, François Duvalier.
- The prototype Aero Boero AB-210 flew for the first time.

== April 23, 1971 (Friday) ==
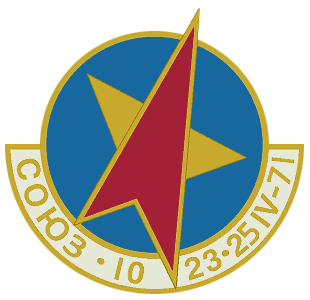
Soyuz 10 insignia

- Soyuz 10 was launched by the Soviet Union with cosmonauts Vladimir Shatalov, Aleksei Yeliseyev and Nikolai Rukavishnikov at 5:54 in the morning from Baikonur (2354 UTC April 22) as the first mission in human history to an orbiting space station.
- The Army of Pakistan and the paramilitary Razakar group killed as many as 3,000 civilians in one day in the Jathibhanga massacre as refugees from 12 villages in Thakurgaon District of what is now northwest Bangladesh in order to flee across the border to India.
- New York City became the first government in the United States to require that a definitive expiration date be placed on packages of perishable foods. While food distributors had information printed on packages to allow store managers to determine the date of shipment of an article of food as part of knowing when to withdraw it from the shelf, these had been in the form of "codes indecipherable to the average shopper." Violations of the law were punishable by fines ranging from $25 to $250.
- Vietnam Veterans Against the War, led by former U.S. Navy Lieutenant and future U.S. Senator John F. Kerry, concluded a week-long protest against continued U.S. involvement in the Vietnam War with a group of about 700 veterans throwing away their medals and other recognition for Vietnam service.
- A USAF F-111E, 67-0117, from Edwards AFB, California, crashed in the Mojave Desert during a test flight; both the pilot, Major James W. Hurt, 34, and co-pilot WSO Major Robert J. Furman, 31, of New York City, were killed when the parachute on the escape module failed to open until just before ground impact.
- The Shangri-La Hotel, now the prime luxury resort in Singapore and site of diplomatic summits, opened for the first time. Among the historic events it would later host would be the meeting between the leaders of the People's Republic of China and of Taiwan in 2015.
- The Rolling Stones' album Sticky Fingers was released.

== April 24, 1971 (Saturday) ==
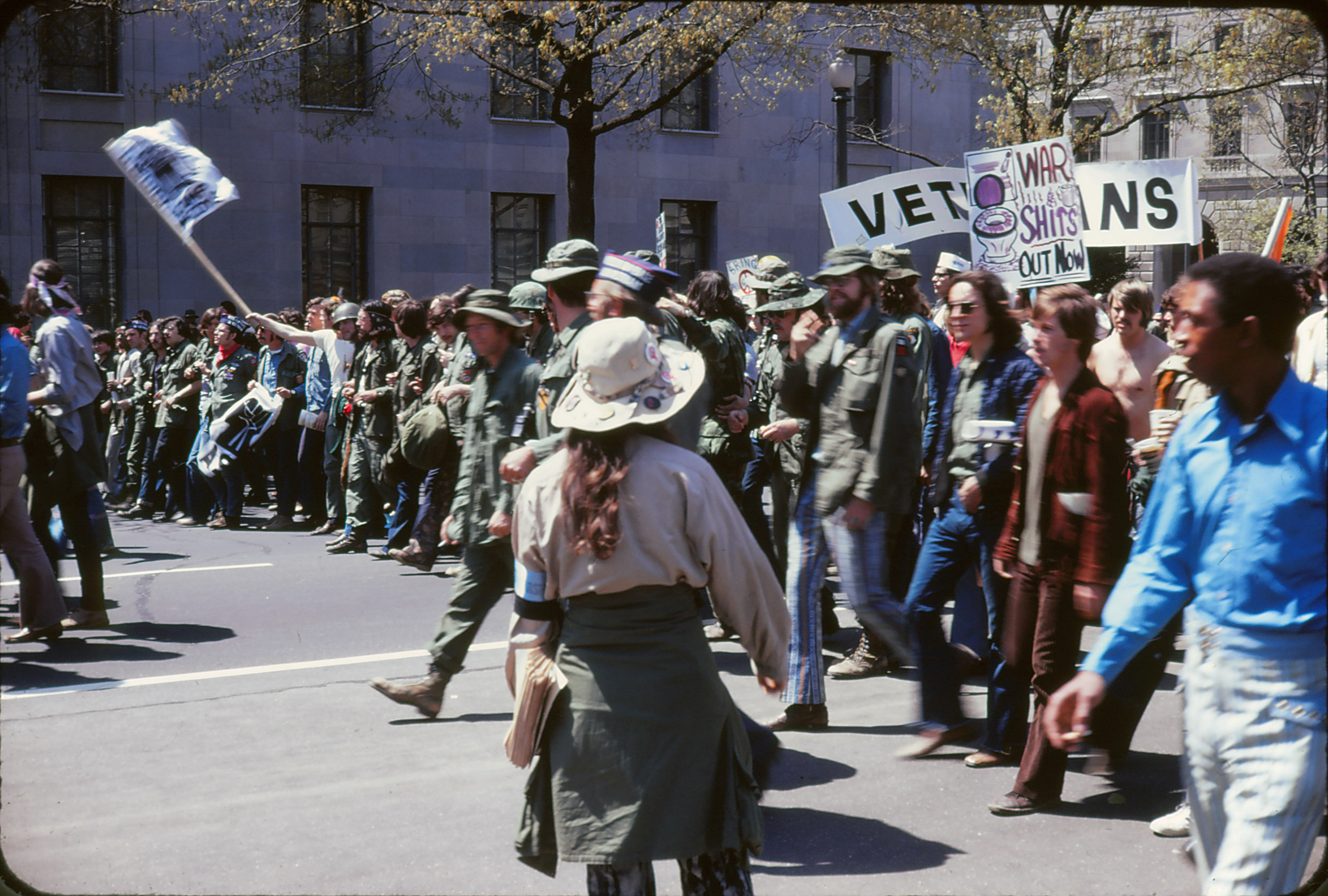
Protests against the Vietnam War in Washington, D.C., on April 24, 1971

- At least 200,000 people in Washington, D.C., and 125,000 in San Francisco marched in protest against the Vietnam War.
- The Soyuz 10 cosmonauts made the first ever attempt by a spacecraft to dock with a space station, achieving a partial docking with Salyut 1 at 01:47 UTC (4:47 a.m. Moscow time). For the next five and a half hours, the Soyuz 10 crew tried to complete the docking so that they could form the secure airlock necessary to safely board the station, then spent more time trying to extricate the Soyuz craft so that it could return to Earth.
- One of the least successful musicals in Broadway history, Frank Merriwell, or Honor Unchallenged opened at the Longacre Theatre and closed the same evening. The critics' reviews the next day, which both noted that the show had closed after its single performance, and included comments like "the music is the least admirable aspect of a modestly deplorable adventure" and "all too forgettable" and "incredibly silly" and "there is no trace of imagination".
- David Lewis was elected to succeed Tommy Douglas as leader of Canada's third major party (after the Liberals and the Conservatives), the New Democratic Party (NDP).
- Born: Alejandro Fernández, Mexican singer, in Guadalajara

== April 25, 1971 (Sunday) ==
- The 1971 United Kingdom census was taken. Final results showed the population of the UK to be 55,573,956 people, of whom 45,879,670 were from England; 5,228,963 from Scotland; 2,724,275 from Wales; 1,536,065 from Northern Ireland; and 174,983 from the Channel Islands and the Isle of Man.
- By mutual agreement, the exclusive 1914 lease by the United States of Nicaragua's Corn Islands (Las Islas del Maíz) was terminated. The 99-year lease, made by the Bryan–Chamorro Treaty, had given the U.S. the right to place military bases on the islands, and had originally been set to expire on August 4, 2013.
- Franz Jonas was re-elected as President of Austria for another six-year term, defeating Kurt Waldheim. The Austrian chancellor, Bruno Kreisky, faced elections scheduled for October 10 for the Nationalrat.
- Parliamentary elections were held in Hungary. For the first time under Hungary's Communist government, voters had a choice between members of the nation's Communist Hungarian Socialist Workers' Party (MSzMP) and non-official challengers, with 402 candidates running for the 352 seats of the Országgyűlés. In 49 races, voters had a choice between two candidates. The non-official challengers were still required to pledge support to the MSzMP's agenda, and eight of the Communist incumbents were defeated for re-election by a non-MSzMP opponent. For 168 seats, the non-Communist candidate was unopposed. Of those elected, 224 were members of the Communist nation's sole legal political organization, the other 178 were independents. Party General Secretary János Kádár, Hungary's de facto leader, continued as its de jure leader as well as Chairman of the Council of Ministers.
- Todor Zhivkov was re-elected as leader of the Bulgarian Communist Party. The 110-member Central Committee of the Party also re-elected the 11 full members of the Politburo, but dropped Deputy Premier Lachezar Avramov from the Politburo. The vote came at the conclusion of the 10th Party Congress, which had opened four days earlier.
- After its unsuccessful attempt to dock with the Salyut 1 space station, and then to unhook from the space station, Soyuz 10 returned to Earth, landing in the Kazakh SSR at 5:40 in the morning local time (2340 UTC 4/24) almost exactly 48 hours after it had launched.
- Died: T. V. Soong (Soong Tse-ven), 76, Chinese banker and former Premier of the Republic of China from 1945 to 1947, choked to death at a dinner party at the home of Edward Eu, the chairman of the U.S. branch of the Bank of Canton.

== April 26, 1971 (Monday) ==
- U.S. Air Force Majors Thomas B. Estes and Dewain C. Vick set a supersonic flight endurance record, spending 10 hours and 30 minutes in the air in a Lockheed SR-71 Blackbird and traveling in excess of 15,000 miles (24,000 km) (equivalent to halfway around the world) and slowing to subsonic speeds only for refueling. At times, the aircraft exceeded Mach 3. The SR-71 averaged 1,429 miles per hour (2,300 km/h) or Mach 1.86.
- A Muslim unit of the Pakistani Army, commanded by Abdul Alim, carried out the massacre of 370 Hindu villagers in five villages in the Joypurhat District of East Pakistan (now Bangladesh). In succession, troops looted and burned houses in Karai Kadipur, Chakpara, Sonarpara, Jogipara and Palpara and then lined up civilian men and women and shot them. The International War Crimes Tribunal would bring charges against Alim 40 years later.
- MV Ostrich, a ship of the Bangladeshi Provisional Government, was sunk by Pakistan Air Force F-86 Sabre aircraft.
- The government of Turkey declared a state of siege in 11 provinces, including Ankara, because of violent protest demonstrations.
- The British government approved a plan for a Thames Estuary Airport, near Foulness Island, to serve as London's third major airport, after Heathrow and Gatwick, despite its 55 mi (89 km) distance from the city.
- A 50-member U.S. Presidential Commission, chaired by Henry Cabot Lodge, issued a report recommending that the United States drop further opposition to Communist China's admission into the United Nations, but also advised that the U.S. should oppose the dismissal of Nationalist China (Taiwan) from the UN. "However difficult the People's Republic of China's membership in the U.N. might become," Lodge wrote, "the commission believes there is more hope for peace in its interaction in the organization than in its continued isolation from the U.N., and from the United States."
- Died: Ted Studebaker, 26, U.S. pacifist and Christian missionary in rural South Vietnam, executed by North Vietnamese troops who had invaded the village of Di Linh in the Lam Dong province.

== April 27, 1971 (Tuesday) ==
- Park Chung-hee was re-elected as President of South Korea with 53% of the vote over Kim Dae-jung.
- Pakistani Army troops and militia of the Convention Muslim League faction, led by Kazi Abdul Kader, carried out the murder of 300 Hindu civilians who had gathered at the marketplace in the village of Kaliganj village in what is now Bangladesh's Jaldhaka district, as the refugees were preparing to cross the border to safety in India.
- Voters in predominantly African-American neighborhoods elected in a referendum to incorporate the city of North Charleston, South Carolina. Court suits challenging the referendum would delay the incorporation of the city until June 12, 1972. North Charleston, with a roughly 58% black and Hispanic population, contrasts with 69% white Charleston.
- Hank Aaron of the Atlanta Braves baseball team became only the third player in U.S. Major League Baseball to hit 600 home runs in his career, a feat previously achieved by Babe Ruth and by Willie Mays. On July 21, 1973, he would become only the second player (other than Ruth) to hit 700 home runs in his career.

== April 28, 1971 (Wednesday) ==
- Elections were held in the Netherlands for the Tweede Kamer der Staten-Generaal the "Second Chamber" or lower house of the Dutch Parliament. In that candidates from 14 different political parties were elected to the 150 seats, no party had the necessary 75-seat majority. Although the Labor Party (PvdA) had a plurality with 39 seats, Barend Biesheuvel formed a coalition government of five parties— the Catholic People's Party (KVP)(35 seats), the People's Party for Freedom and Democracy (VVD)(16), his own Anti-Revolutionary Party (ARP) (13 seats), the Democratic Socialists '70 (DS'70)(8) and the Christian Historical Union (CHU)(7) on July 6 to succeed retiring Prime Minister Piet de Jong.
- OSHA, the Occupational Safety and Health Administration, was created as part of the U.S. Department of Labor as the Occupational Safety and Health Act went into effect. The act had been signed into law by U.S. President Nixon on December 29, 1970. George Guenther was the first OSHA Director.
- Captain Samuel L. Gravely, Jr. was selected by President Nixon as the first African-American U.S. Navy Admiral, subject to expected confirmation by the U.S. Senate. Nixon's group of 49 selections for promotion also included the first American astronaut, Alan B. Shepard, Jr., to achieve the rank.
- In India, Indira Gandhi's cabinet of ministers approved an order to intervene in Pakistan on behalf of Bangladesh, and directed the Indian Army Chief of Staff, Field Marshal Sam Manekshaw, to "go into East Pakistan".
- The first issue of the daily newspaper, Il Manifesto, was published in Italy.
- J. Edgar Hoover, the U.S. director of the Federal Bureau of Investigation (FBI), quietly canceled COINTELPRO, his 1968 campaign against what he called "The New Left". The decision came three days after Hoover had been accused of "secret police tactics" by Congressman Hale Boggs of Louisiana, following receipt of documents taken in a March 8 break-in of an FBI branch office.

== April 29, 1971 (Thursday) ==
- Avianca Flight 81, a Boeing 720 flying from Los Angeles, California, United States, to Bogotá, Colombia, was hijacked by a lone man who demanded to be flown to Cuba. The airliner diverted to Panama City, Panama, where the hijacker was arrested.

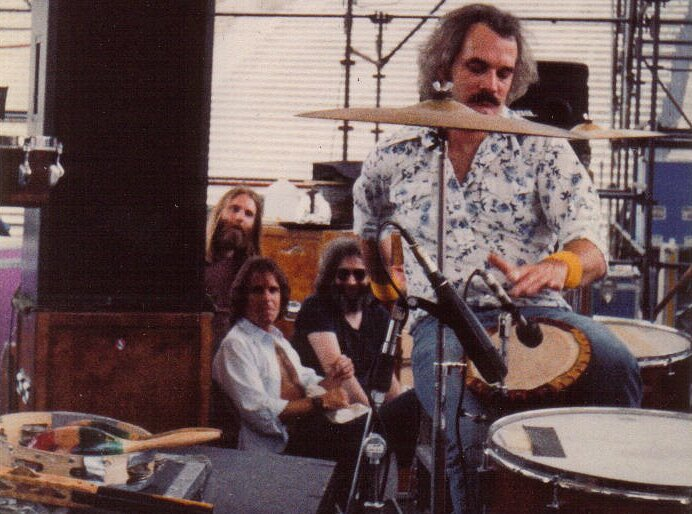
The Grateful Dead in rehearsal

- The Grateful Dead made the last of a run of three appearances at Fillmore East, one of their last performances at the venue.
- Bolivia nationalizes the American-owned Matilde zinc mine.
- Died: Nikolai P. Barabashov, 77, Soviet astronomer and co-creator (in 1961) of the first map of the far side of the Moon

== April 30, 1971 (Friday) ==
- The Milwaukee Bucks won the NBA championship, sweeping all four games of the series against the Baltimore Bullets. The Bucks, with Lew Alcindor (who would soon change his name to Kareem Abdul-Jabbar) and Oscar Robertson, beat the Bullets, 118 to 106, after winning the first three games 98–88, 102-83 and 107–99. The Bullets were outclassed despite having future Hall of Famers Wes Unseld and Earl Monroe on their roster.
- Reversing decades of policy against foreign relations with the United States, Chinese Communist Party Chairman Mao Zedong told American writer Edgar Snow that U.S. President Nixon would be welcome to visit the People's Republic of China The statement came the day after Nixon had said in a press conference that he expected to visit China "sometime in some capacity."
- The Joint Social Welfare Institute was created by the government of Costa Rica.
- In the U.S., all F-111s were grounded as a result of the fatal accident on April 23, after it was determined that the recovery chute compartment door had failed to separate, making crew escape impossible.
- The day before Amtrak took over passenger train operations in the United States, Union Pacific Railroad and Chicago and North Western Railway terminated the operation of the City of Los Angeles and City of Denver trains, while the Capitol Limited train, flagship of the Baltimore and Ohio Railroad, made its final trip, and the United States Post Office Department canceled all but one of the eight remaining Railway Mail Service routes
