= Operation Chamber =

- Part of Rhodesian Bush War
Date	4 June 1979
Location	Chinvinge, Tete Province, People's Republic of Mozambique
Result	Rhodesian victory

Belligerents
Zimbabwe Rhodesia	ZANLA

Commanders and leaders
(Zimbabwe Rhodesia) Unknown	Unknown

Units involved
Rhodesian Army: RLI; RhAF	Unknown

Strength
Unknown	Unknown

Casualties and losses
3 killed	Unknown

Operation Chamber was a military raid launched by the Rhodesian Security Forces (RSF) against a camp belonging to the communist insurgent group, ZANLA. The cadres camp was located in Chinvinge, Tete Province, Mozambique. During the course of the operation three troopers were killed, Corporal P O Rice, Trooper C.F Lang and Lance Corporal E Nel were killed.

In the aftermath of the raid on the 9th of June Operation Mineral was launched by the SAS, which took place in Manica Province.

== Bibliography ==
- Geldenhuys, Preller (2007). Rhodesian Air Force Operations with Air Strike Log. Durban, South Africa: Just Done Productions Publishing (published 13 July 2007). ISBN 978-1-920169-61-9. Archived from the original on 24 December 2014.
