= March 1971 =

Month of 1971

<<	March 1971					>>
Su	Mo	Tu	We	Th	Fr	Sa
	1	2	3	4	5	6
7	8	9	10	11	12	13
14	15	16	17	18	19	20
21	22	23	24	25	26	27
28	29	30	31

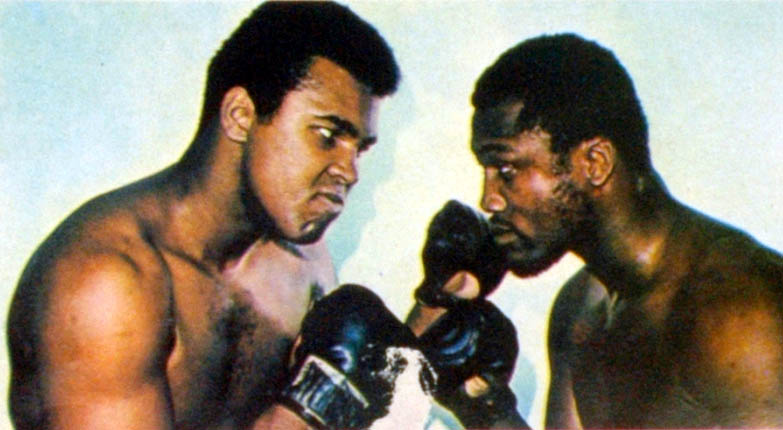
March 8, 1971: Long-awaited Frazier v. Ali boxing bout takes place in New York

March 26, 1971: East Pakistan announces split from West Pakistan as Bangladesh

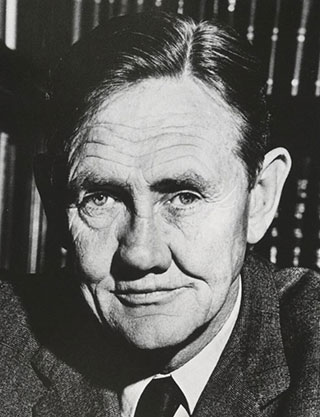
March 10, 1971: Australia's Prime Minister votes against himself in a tiebreaker over his ouster, steps down

The following events occurred in March 1971:

== March 1, 1971 (Monday) ==
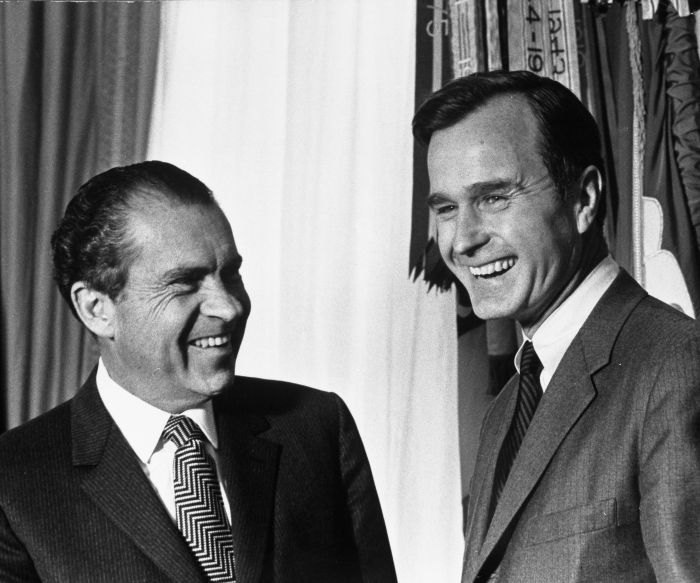
37th president and future 41st president

- Future U.S. President George H. W. Bush, described by The New York Times as "a 46-year old Republican and former Congressman from Texas without previous diplomatic experience", took office as the new United States Ambassador to the United Nations.
- A ten-day period of voting began in India for the 518 seats of the directly elected house of parliament, the Lok Sabha, for the fifth time since India's independence. On the first day, voting took place in nine of India's 18 states and three of its 8 union territories. In all, 275 million people were eligible to vote.
- A bomb exploded in a men's room at the United States Capitol. Nobody was injured in the blast, which took place at 1:52 in the morning and was preceded by a bomb warning phoned in a half hour earlier to the Capitol switchboard. Weather Underground Organization later claimed responsibility.
- Pakistani President Agha Muhammad Yahya Khan indefinitely postponed the pending National Assembly session, precipitating massive civil disobedience in East Pakistan.
- The government of Poland lowered food prices to their 1970 levels after rioting and strikes in December, January and February.
- In Italy, a government crisis began as the PRI left the coalition government of Prime Minister Emilio Colombo, a Christian Democrat, leading to the second-largest party in the coalition, the Socialists, threatening to go against him in a confidence unless Colombo formed a coalition with the Italian Communists Party.
- Singapore banned all tobacco advertising in newspapers and magazines, two months after the December 31 ban on TV and radio commercials.
- Bass player John Deacon became an official member of Queen and the band was complete, creating the classic lineup of the legendary British rock band with Freddie Mercury on piano, Brian May on guitar, and Roger Taylor on drums.
- British commercial diver Michael Brushneen drowned after experiencing a decompression problem while conducting a dive in the North Sea from the semi-submersible drill rig Ocean Viking. Brushneen suffered a pulmonary barotrauma resulting in pneumothorax. Another British diver, Michael Lally, had died exactly one month earlier during a dive from the same rig.
- Born:
  - Ma Dong-seok, South Korean film actor, billed in the U.S. as Don Lee
  - Allen Johnson, American track athlete and 1996 Olympic gold medalist in the 110 meter hurdles; gold medalist in four world championships in 1995, 1997, 2001 and 2003; in Washington, D.C.
- Died:
  - Harald Damsleth, 64, Norwegian cartoonist and illustrator
  - Bernardo Mattarella, 65, Italian government minister and co-founder of the revived Democrazia Cristiana after World War II; father of the current President of Italy Sergio Mattarella and of the martyred Sicilian Region President Piersanti Mattarella

== March 2, 1971 (Tuesday) ==
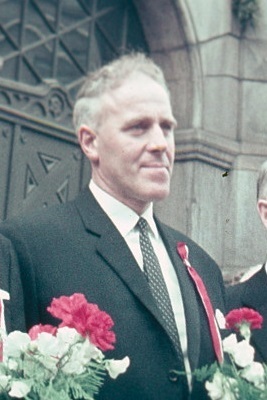
Per Borten

- Norway's Prime Minister Per Borten and his cabinet of ministers resigned after Borten admitted that he had leaked a confidential report from Norway's embassy in Belgium concerning Norway's negotiations for entry into the European Economic Community (EEC), the Common Market.
- The Tupamaros guerrillas in Uruguay released Dr. Claude Fly, a U.S. agricultural adviser who had been kidnapped on August 7. After Fly suffered a heart attack in captivity, the Tupamaros drove him to The British Hospital in Montevideo in a station wagon, carried him out on a stretcher, and departed before police realized what had happened.

The Bangladesh rebel flag

- A flag of Bangladesh was hoisted for the first time as a group of students at Dhaka University, led by future cabinet minister A. S. M. Abdur Rab raised a banner in East Pakistan, similar to what the official flag would later be. The flag was unveiled in places across East Pakistan on "Resistance Day", March 23, a campaign of civil disobedience against the martial law imposed by Pakistan's President Yahya Khan, along with announcements at rallies that the flag was for what was reported in the Western press for the first time as "Bangla Desh", the Bengali nation.
- Born:
  - Dave Gorman, English comedian, in Stafford
  - Stefano Accorsi, Italian actor, in Bologna.
  - Manami Toyota, Japanese female professional wrestling champion; in Masuda, Shimane
  - Karel Rada, Czech Republic soccer football defender; in Karlovy Vary, Czechoslovakia
- Died:
  - Charles W. Engelhard, Jr., 54, American multimillionaire businessman, philanthropist and owner of Nijinsky, one of the few winners of the Triple Crown of English thoroughbred racing, winning the 2,000 Guineas Stakes, the Epsom Derby and the St Leger Stakes in 1970.
  - Assault, 28, American thoroughbred racehorse and one of the few winners of the Triple Crown of U.S. thoroughbred racing, winning the Kentucky Derby, the Preakness and the Belmont Stakes in 1946.

== March 3, 1971 (Wednesday) ==
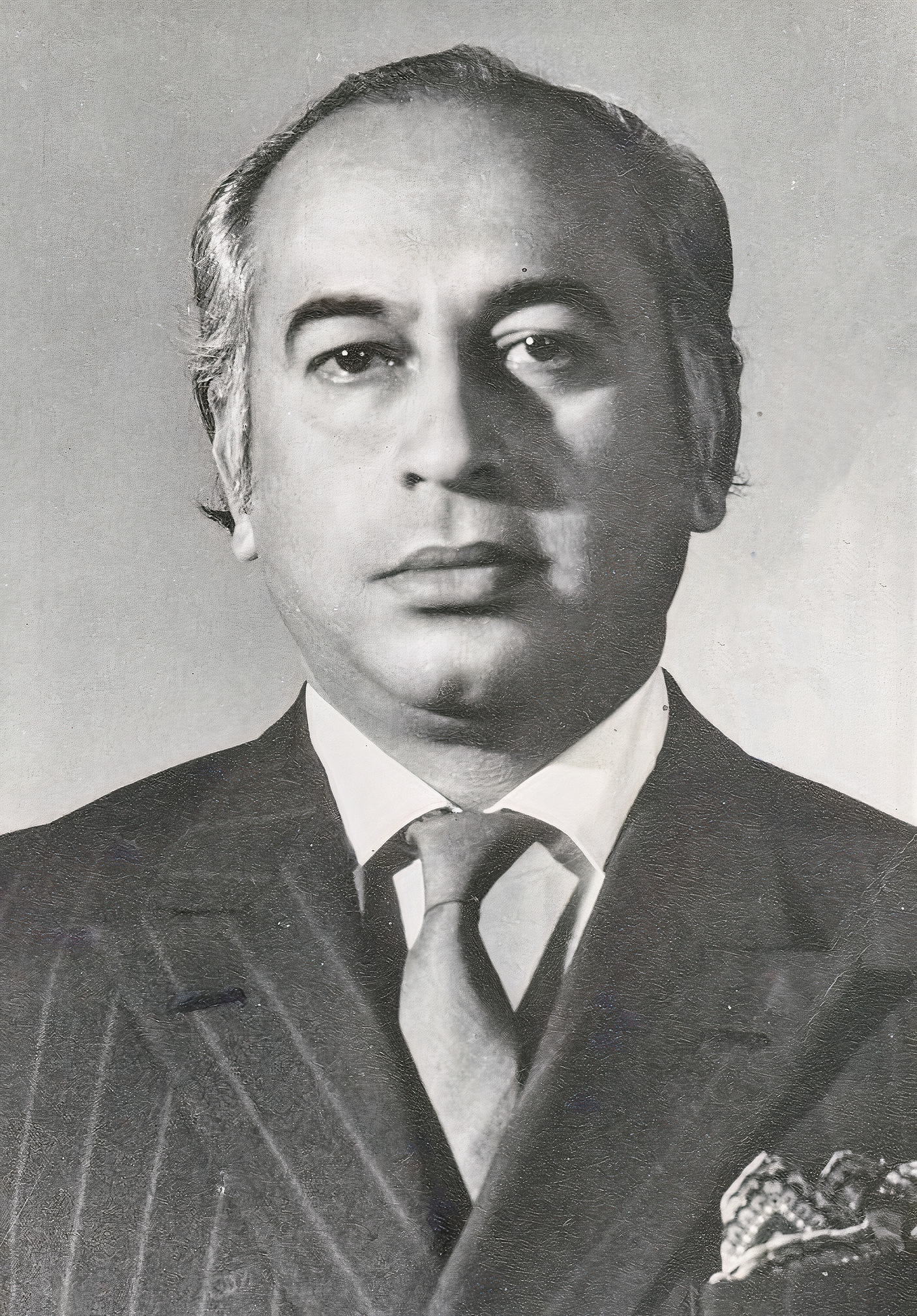
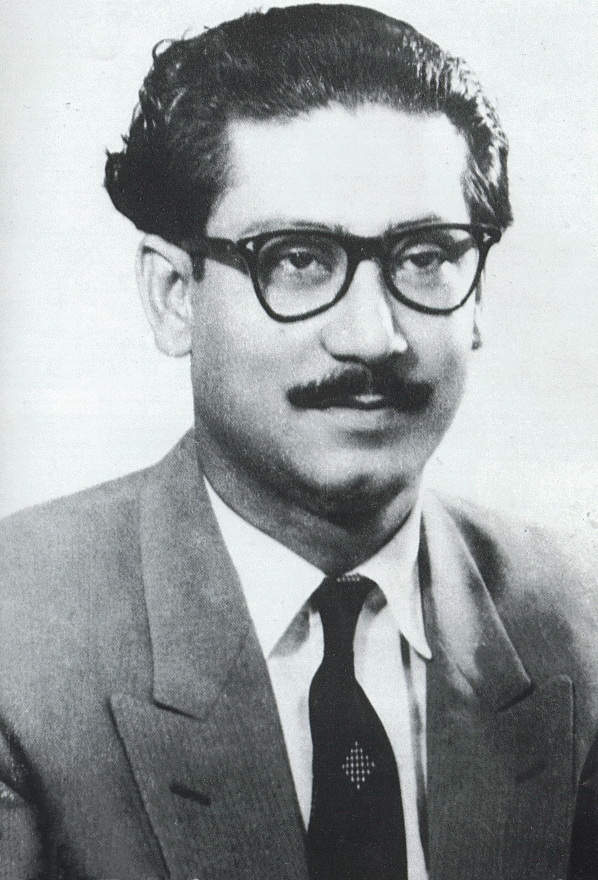
Zulfikar Bhutto and Mujibur Rahman
- The People's Republic of China launched a satellite into Earth orbit for the second time, sending ShiJian 1 up from the Jiuquan Satellite Launch Center in Shuangchengtze in China's Gansu province. The launch took place at 7:15 pm local time (1215 UTC). China's Xinhua News Agency announced on March 16 that the launch was successful and that the "man-made scientific experiment" weighed 486 pounds (220 kg).
- A final effort to prevent the breakup of Pakistan, which was divided among the primarily Urdu-speaking West Pakistan and the mostly Bengali-speaking East Pakistan, was made in the East Pakistani capital at Dhaka, where the new parliament had been scheduled to meet. With Pakistan's President Yahya Khan moderating, Pakistan Peoples Party leader Zulfikar Ali Bhutto (for West Pakistan) and Awami League leader Sheikh Mujibur Rahman (for East Pakistan) reached a tentative agreement for Bhutto to be president and Mujibar Rahman to be prime minister. The compromise was scuttled, however, when Yahya Khan voided the election results that had given the Awami League majority control of the National Assembly.
- Born: Willie Martinez, Puerto Rican jockey, in Santurce, San Juan

== March 4, 1971 (Thursday) ==
- A Lockheed D-21B military reconnaissance drone aircraft made an abortive attempt to spy on the Lop Nor nuclear test site in the People's Republic of China. The first two unmanned D-21B missions failed in spying on Lop Nor; the first failed to turn around and crashed with its cargo in the USSR; the second, on December 16, 1970, turned around but the parachute on its container of photographs failed and the cargo crashed into the sea. On the March 4 attempt, photographs were taken and the container was released, but a midair recovery attempt failed and a ship recovery struck the package and caused it to sink.
- The southern part of Quebec, and especially Montreal, averaged 17 inches (43 cm) of snow from the night before and until 5:00 in the evening, in what became known as La tempête du siècle ("The Storm of the Century").
- Canada's Prime Minister Pierre Trudeau, who had remained a bachelor until the age of 51, married 22-year old Margaret Sinclair in North Vancouver, British Columbia, concealing the event from the press by announcing that he had departed Ottawa on a skiing vacation. The ceremony was conducted by Gordon Gibson, a special assistant in Trudeau's office. The Trudeaus' first child, future Prime Minister Justin Trudeau, would be born slightly more than nine months later, on December 25.
- American mathematician Bryant Tuckerman discovered the 24th Mersenne prime number (a prime number that is one less than a power of two or a function of M_{n} = 2^{n} − 1), by proving that

$2^{19937}-1$ (a number with 6,002 digits and the first Mersenne prime to be found since 1963) was not divisible by any numbers but itself and 1.

- Died: Jacinto Gutierrez, University of Puerto Rico Río Piedras campus ROTC cadet, and Puerto Rican police officers Juan Birino Mercado and Miguel Rosario Rondón, all killed at the Reserve Officers Training Corps building during a riot by groups opposing the program's presence on the campus

== March 5, 1971 (Friday) ==
- Led Zeppelin performed "Stairway to Heaven" live for the first time, at Belfast's Ulster Hall. Led Zeppelin bassist John Paul Jones would recall later that the first listeners "were all bored to tears waiting to hear something they knew"
- Born: Yuri Lowenthal, American voice actor, producer, and screenwriter, in Alliance, Ohio
- Died:
  - Allan Nevins, 80, American historian and Pulitzer Prize winner who pioneered the oral history movement of recording memories of ordinary citizens for preservation for future generations.
  - Punch Broadbent, 78, Canadian ice hockey power forward for the National Hockey League and its predecessor, the National Hockey Association, and an inductee into the Hockey Hall of Fame

== March 6, 1971 (Saturday) ==
- Tempo, the Indonesian weekly news magazine, published its first issue. On June 21, 1994, in a crackdown on freedom of the press in Indonesia, Tempo would be banned (along with two other magazines, Editor and DeTik), but would be revived after the fall of the government of President Suharto in 1998.
- Pakistan's President Yahya Khan announced in a speech that despite the cancellation of the scheduled March 3 opening of Pakistan's newly elected National Assembly in Dhaka, the first session to draft a new constitution would be held in the East Pakistan capital on March 25 in preparation of the return to civil rule.
- A fire at Burghölzli, the psychiatric research hospital for the University of Zurich in Switzerland, killed 28 men who were patients.
- Italy sustained the coldest recorded temperatures in its history, with a low of −34.6 °C (−30.3 °F) measured in Plateau Rosa and a snowstorm shutting down Rome and surrounding cities.

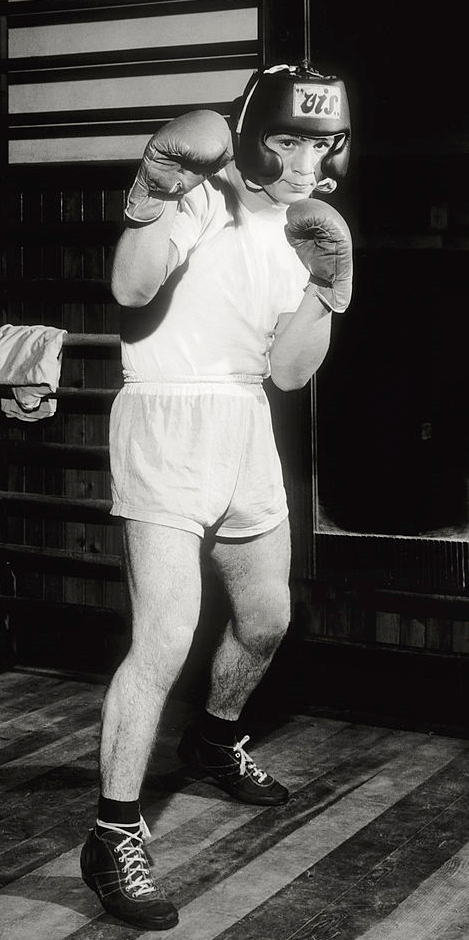
Bruno Arcari

- In Rome, one of the bloodier title fights in modern boxing history took place as both boxers had cuts above their eyes. Italy's Bruno Arcari retained the World Boxing Council (WBC) junior welterweight world championship in a rematch against Brazil's João Henrique on points given by the sole judge, Teddy Waltham of England. Neither boxer was knocked down during the 15-round bout. The 9th round ended with both fighters bleeding from open cuts over their eyebrows, Arcari having blood dripping into both eyes and Henrique a cut over his right eye. Waltham deemed Arcari to be ahead, 74 points to 68, at the fight's end and declared him the victor. Because of Rome's blizzard, only 9,000 people attended at the Palazzetto dello Sport.

== March 7, 1971 (Sunday) ==
- Sheikh Mujibur Rahman, political leader of then East Pakistan (present day - Bangladesh), delivered the famous "7 March Speech" at the infield of the Ramna Race Course at Dhaka, to over two million people, calling on the masses to be prepared to fight against West Pakistan for Bengali independence. The inspirational speech lasted only 18 minutes but was the cornerstone for the Bangladesh Liberation War that began on March 25.
- Die Sendung mit der Maus airs its first episode on Das Erste.
- The British postal workers' strike, led by UPW General Secretary Tom Jackson, ended after 47 days. The vote to return to work was 1,059 for and 61 against, and most of Britain's post offices reopened the next day.
- The American Safety Razor Company put an actual razor blade in its advertisements in the Sunday newspapers in 37 U.S. cities in order to get customers to try its new "Tungsten Steel" Personna 74 blade, billed as "the sharpest, longest-lasting razor blade" made, with each sharp object covered by a small paper that said "Contains razor blade. Keep away from children." After criticism and protests, the company called off the promotion six days later.
- Born: Tal Banin, Israeli soccer football midfielder with 80 appearances for the Israeli national team and manager; in Haifa
- Died:
  - Barney Balaban, 83, American film executive who was president of Paramount Pictures from 1936 to 1964; and innovator who implemented the idea of air conditioning in theaters
  - Stevie Smith (pen name for Florence Margaret Smith), 68, English poet and novelist, from a brain tumor. Her life story was adapted into a theatre production and then into a 1978 motion picture.

== March 8, 1971 (Monday) ==
- World heavyweight boxing champion Joe Frazier defeated former champ Muhammad Ali at Madison Square Garden in what was billed as the "Fight of the Century". In the 15th and last round, Frazier knocked Ali down, and the bout continued. Afterward, the three judge panel declared Frazier the victor on points.
- Sabotage organized by the Ação Revolucionária Armada destroyed 28 helicopters and light aircraft of the Portuguese Air Force at the Tancos air base in Vila Nova da Barquinha. A dozen are completely destroyed, the rest damaged
- Members of the Citizens' Commission to Investigate the FBI broke into the FBI office in Media, Pennsylvania, stealing documents that they later released to the media, bringing an end to the FBI's COINTELPRO program of spying against U.S. citizens. Although copies of the documents were mailed to several different media outlets, the Washington Post was the only one to break the story after verifying the authenticity of the material. FBI Director J. Edgar Hoover would quietly cancel the COINTELPRO program on April 28, after being accused by U.S. Congressman Hale Boggs of "secret police tactics".
- R. A. Siddiqui, the Chief Justice of the High Court in East Pakistan, refused to administer the oath of office to the new military governor of East Pakistan, appointed by Pakistan's President Yahya Khan.
- Australia's Minister for Defence, Malcolm Fraser, resigned after accusing Prime Minister John Gorton of "extreme disloyalty" to the Ministry and to the armed forces. The dispute triggered Gorton's removal as head of the Liberal Party. Fraser himself would later become Prime Minister of Australia in 1975.
- Died: Harold Lloyd, 77, American film comedian and stunt performer

== March 9, 1971 (Tuesday) ==
- The U.S. Senate took a vote on changing its rules on ending a filibuster, falling 8 votes short of the required two-thirds majority necessary to change Senate rules. The vote on easing the Senate's ability to invoke cloture to end long debates, intended to block senate legislation, was 55 in favor and 39 against, but required a 63 to 31 vote of the 94 senators present. Although cloture can still be invoked by a 60% vote of the senators present on most issues, the filibuster cloture rule was amended for nominations in 2017, and filibusters can now be stopped by a simple majority of the U.S. Senate.
- Born:
  - Kinga Rusin, Polish TV journalist and producer; in Warsaw
  - Diego Torres, Argentinian pop singer, in Buenos Aires
- Died:
  - Pope Cyril VI of Alexandria, 68, patriarch of the Coptic Christian church since 1959
  - K. Asif, 48, Indian film director
  - Anthony Berkeley Cox, 77, English crime writer known for the Roger Sheringham mysteries as Anthony Berkeley; he also published under the pen names Francis Iles, A. B. Cox, and A. Monmouth Platts
  - Barry Wood, 60, American football player and bacteriologist

== March 10, 1971 (Wednesday) ==
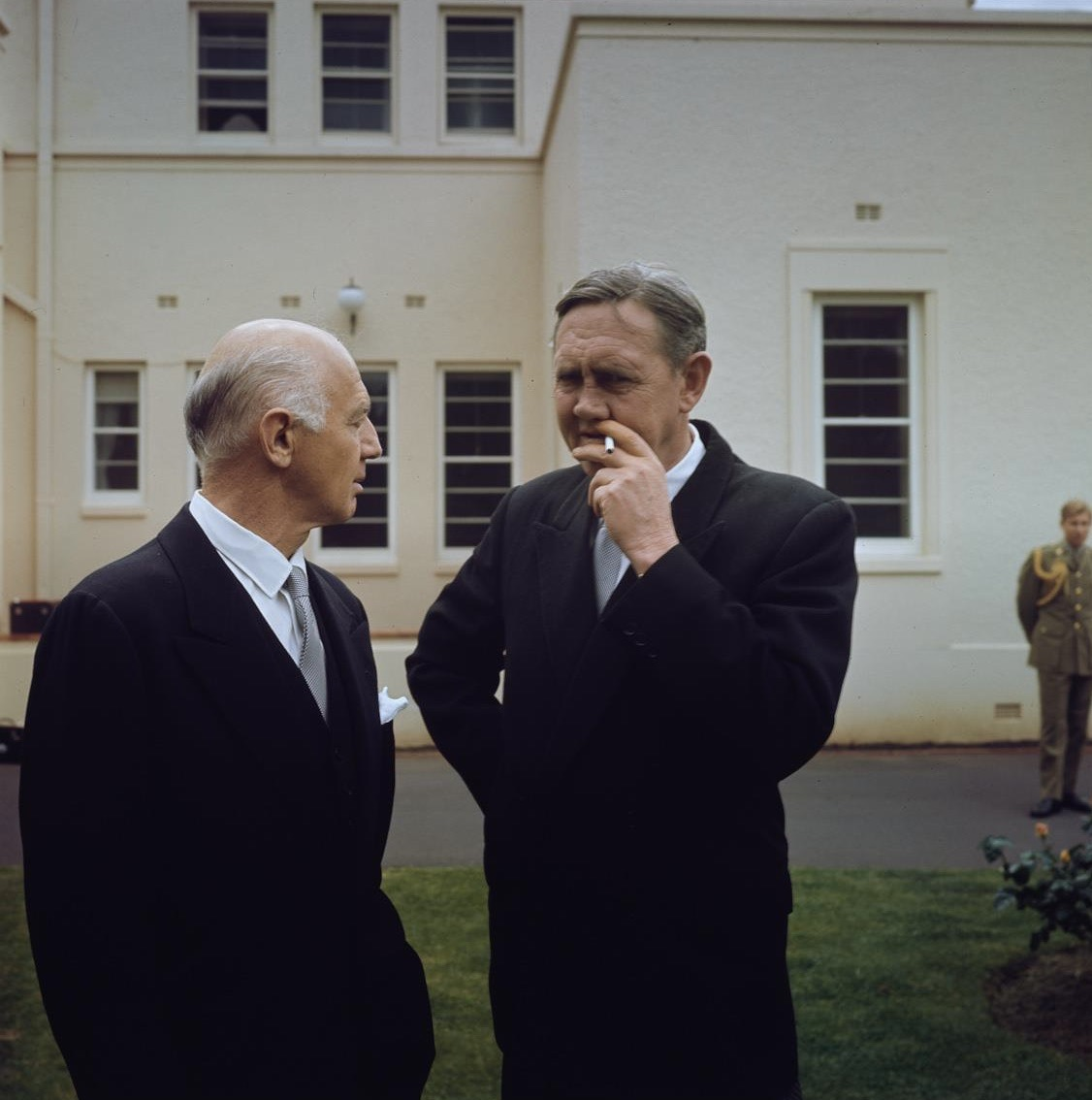
McMahon and Gorton

- John Gorton resigned as Prime Minister of Australia and as the leader of the Liberal Party of Australia after a secret ballot vote of confidence by his fellow Liberal Party members of parliament ended in a 33 to 33 tie. Gorton, who had abstained in the first vote, then told the group that he no longer had the support of the Liberal Party and cast the tiebreaker vote against himself, making a 34 to 33 defeat before resigning. In a secret ballot for the next leader of the party and prime minister, Foreign Minister William McMahon defeated Labor Minister Billy Snedden to take office. McMahon then made Gorton the Minister of Defence to replace Malcolm Fraser, whose resignation had caused the government crisis.
- Tupamaro guerrillas kidnapped the Attorney General of Uruguay, Guido Berro Oribe from his home in Montevideo for an interrogation about the location of captured and imprisoned guerrillas. Oribe was held for 13 days and then released on March 23 by his captors.
- Voting concluded in the election for India's Lok Sabha, with 271 of the 518 races already decided from elections held in the first week. Prime Minister Indira Gandhi increased her margin of control of India's parliament, with her Indian National Congress (R) capturing 352 of the 521 seats, a two-thirds majority necessary under the Constitution of India to pass amendments.
- Born: Jon Hamm, American television actor best known as the star of Mad Men; in St. Louis

== March 11, 1971 (Thursday) ==
- Fifteen children were killed and 72 injured in a train accident near Vicuña in northern Chile. An investigation determined that the crew had left the train and its 350 passengers unattended when a six-year-old boy went into the locomotive and inadvertently released the brakes that had been holding the train in place on an incline.
- The science fiction movie THX 1138, the first theatrical film directed by George Lucas, was released by Warner Brothers and premiered in the United States. The dystopian futuristic thriller, with a story set in the 25th century, was not initially successful but became a film classic.
- At a meeting of the Committee for the Re-Election of the President (CRP), the fundraiser for the 1972 campaign of U.S. President Nixon, $250,000 was approved for "intelligence gathering" against the Democratic Party, a decision that would lead to the Watergate scandal.
- Born: Johnny Knoxville (stage name for Philip John Clapp), American TV and film actor best known for the Jackass prank series; in Knoxville, Tennessee
- Died:
  - Whitney Young, 49, American civil rights leader and president of the National Urban League and the National Association of Social Workers since 1969, drowned while swimming during a visit to Nigeria. Young, accompanied by former U.S. Attorney General Ramsey Clark and four other people, was swimming in the ocean when he apparently suffered a heart attack.
  - Philo T. Farnsworth, 64, American inventor who created the first fully functional television system with receiver and camera
  - C. D. Broad, 83, English philosopher

== March 12, 1971 (Friday) ==
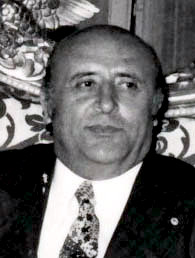
Demirel

- Süleyman Demirel was forced to resign as Prime Minister of Turkey after being served an ultimatum by the Turkish Armed Forces Chief of Staff, General Memduh Tağmaç. The "coup by memorandum" took place with delivery of the ultimatum from Tağmaç and three other military leaders (Army General Faruk Gürler, Air Force General Muhsin Batur and Admiral Celal Eyicioglu) to President Cevdet Sunay and to the leaders of the Turkish House of Assembly and of the Senate (Tekin Ariburun), directing that Demirel be dismissed by the President under threat of a military takeover of the civilian government. Demirel resigned after a three-hour meeting with his cabinet.

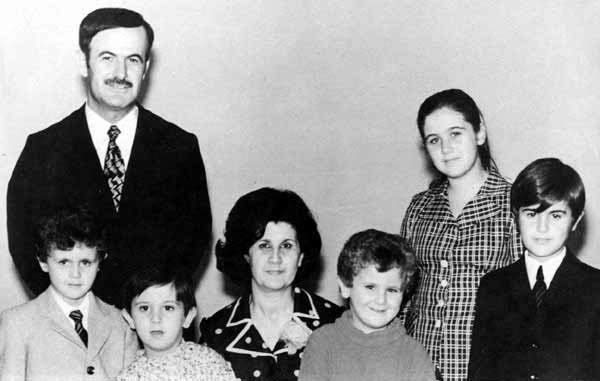
Hafez al-Assad with son Bashar (far left) and family c. 1971

- Voters in Syria approved the presidency of Prime Minister Hafez al-Assad, with a reported 95.8% turnout and a 99.2% vote for approval for the unopposed candidate. Assad, being selected for a seven-year term in the first popular vote since 1962, reportedly was seeking endorsement for his policies of relaxed security and the lowering of prices. Assad, who replaced the ceremonial head of state Ahmad al-Khatib, formally took office on March 20 and subsequently built the position of president of Syria into absolute power and would serve until his death on June 10, 2000. His son and successor, Bashar al-Assad, was five years old at the time of Hafez al-Assad's assumption of the presidency.
- Two 15th-century paintings, The Madonna and Child by Masaccio, and Portrait of a Gentleman by Hans Memling were stolen in a burglary in Florence of the Palazzo Vecchio. An environmental activist group sent a letter to the Rome newspaper Paese Sera a week later, claiming that it had stolen the paintings "to protest air and water pollution in Tuscany" and that it would keep both masterpieces until 10 factories in the Tuscany region were closed. The robbery was the first of a series of art thefts over a four-day period, with a 15th-century painting by Antonello Da Messina the same day from a church in Sicily, a 15th-century triptych by Sano di Pietro on Saturday, and a 17th century etching by Rembrandt from an art exhibit in Florence on Monday.
- The High Chaparral, a western action adventure drama on NBC, broadcast its 98th and final episode, ending a four-season run.

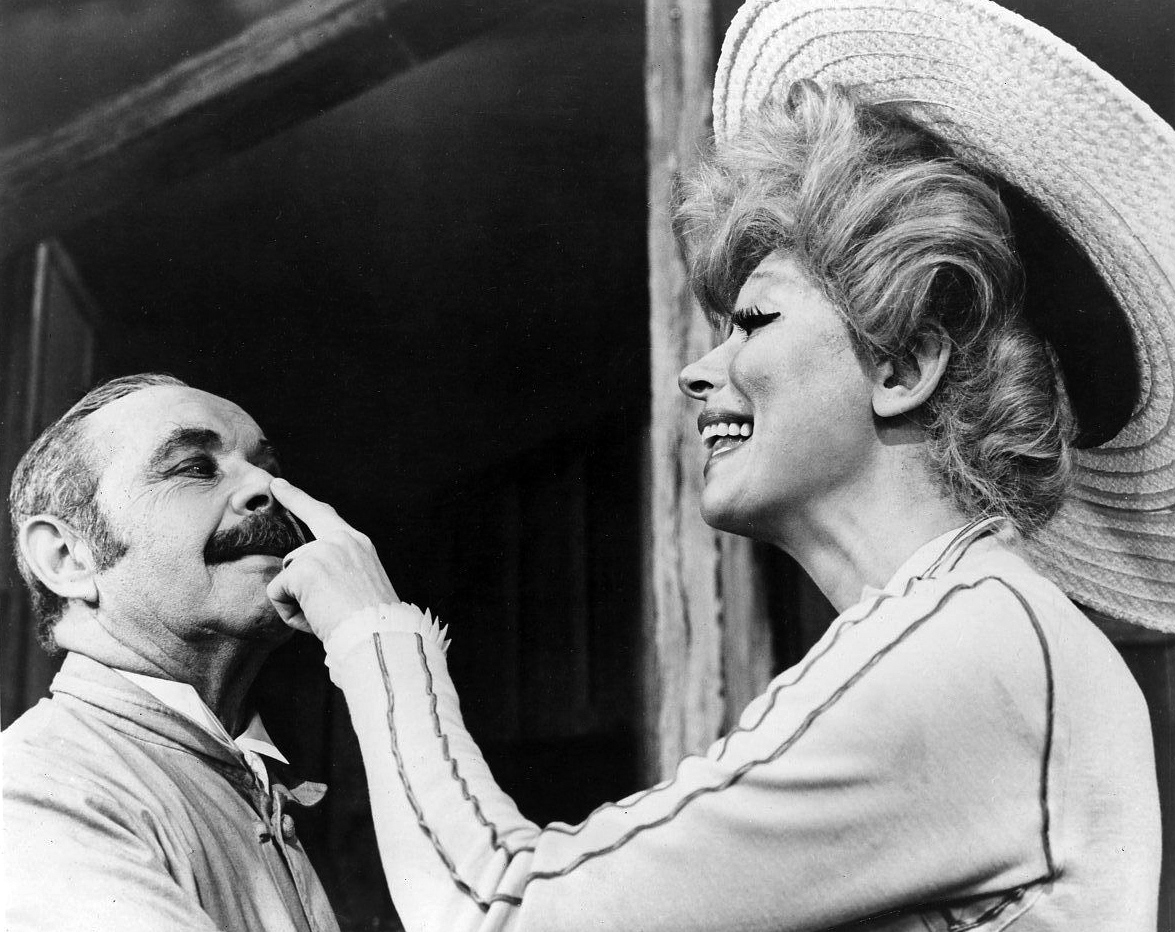
Burns and Channing in Hello, Dolly!

- Died:
  - David Burns, 68, American stage and TV actor and singer, died on stage while acting in the off-Broadway musical 70, Girls, 70 at the Forrest Theater in Philadelphia. Burns, who had received billing second only to star Carol Channing in the original Broadway production of Hello, Dolly! called himself "the world's biggest unknown star". He collapsed at the end of the second act of the Philadelphia play after "he had just gotten the biggest laugh of the evening".
  - Elliot Quincy Adams, 82, American scientist

== March 13, 1971 (Saturday) ==
- Explorer 43, the first orbiting satellite to carry its own computer, was launched from Cape Kennedy to gather the most comprehensive survey up to that time of radio data of solar rays, cosmic rays from other galaxies, solar winds, radio signals from outside the Solar System, and magnetic fields in space. Dr. Frank B. McDonald, the NASA project astrophysicist, told reporters "This is a fairly complete remote laboratory that will give us a good scientific picture of what goes on out there."
- The day after the military coup in Turkey, Tekin Ariburun, president of the Turkish Senate, defied the nation's military leaders and called for a nationwide referendum to determine popular opinion about the recently deposed Demirel government. While no referendum was held, Ariburun would continue to head the Senate until 1977.
- In Åre (Sweden) the Italian Gustav Thoni, won the FIS Alpine Ski World Cup, despite finishing in fifth place in the giant slalom race, because of points accumulated in earlier events. The win was the first of five in a row by the "Blue Avalanche" team of Italian skiers in the FIS circuit.
- At Cardiff Arms Park, Wales defeated Ireland 23–9 in the 1971 Five Nations Championship to take the "Triple Crown" of rugby union football in the British Isles (having defeated England 22–6, Scotland 19-18 and Ireland 23–9).
- At Inzell, Ard Schenk set a new world record of 7:12.0 in the 5,000 m speed skating event.
- Born:
  - Annabeth Gish, American actress, in Albuquerque, New Mexico
  - Maxim Kononenko, Russian journalist, in Apatity
  - Allan Nielsen, Danish footballer, in Esbjerg
- Died:
  - Rockwell Kent, 88, American artist
  - Henry T. Laurency (pen name for Henrik Theofron Laurentius von Zeipel), 88, Swedish philosopher

== March 14, 1971 (Sunday) ==
- Chile's President Salvador Allende avoided an assassination attempt by finishing a speech ahead of schedule. Allende had been speaking to 15,000 people in an arena in Santiago and was on his way out of the building when a bomb exploded directly above the speaker's platform where he had been standing minutes earlier.
- In Rome, the “Friends of the Armed Forces”, led by right-wing politician Giovanni de Lorenzo, protested leftist violence and demanded the overthrow of the Italian government.
- Hafez al-Assad was formally sworn in as President of Syria.
- Ard Schenk of the Netherlands became the first person to skate 10,000 meters in less than 15 minutes, lowering his own world record from 15:01.6 to 14:55.9 at the ISU World Sprint Championship in the West German city of Inzell.
- The 1971 Bandy World Championship was won by the Soviet Union in a tournament that involved the four nations in the world that had a team that played bandy, a game that uses the ball and sticks of field hockey, and the skates and ice of ice hockey. In the final, the Soviets (4–1–0) faced Sweden (4–0–1) and won, 2 goals to 1.
- Died:
  - David John Cashman, 58, English Roman Catholic bishop
  - Milan Radenkovich, 29, American recording artist and record producer who went by the nickname "The Leather Boy"; from brain cancer.

== March 15, 1971 (Monday) ==
- Sheik Mujibur Rahman, leader of the Awami League in East Pakistan, announced that he was taking over administration of East Pakistan's 70 million residents rather than to allow the province to be controlled by a military governor appointed from Pakistan's central government in West Pakistan. Mujib issued 35 directives, including the suspension of the collection of taxes that would normally be sent to the central government in Rawalpindi.
- Pakistan's President Yahya Khan arrived in Dhaka later in the day to hold talks with Mujib about whether East Pakistan would have autonomy within Pakistan or if it would become a separate nation.
- Australia's new Prime Minister William McMahon and his government narrowly survived a vote of no confidence in the Australian House of Representatives, despite some opposition by his own party. The motion failed by four votes, with 58 for and 62 against.
- The U.S. Department of State lifted a 21-year ban against travel by Americans to mainland China, as part of a new policy of improving relations with the People's Republic. However, officials noted that China had not yet expressed a willingness to allow Americans to visit, disclosing that only three Americans out of 1,000 applicants had been granted entry visas.
- The second Revised Standard Version of the New Testament was published, incorporating the Bodmer Papyri and other Greek manuscripts not available prior to the 1962 first edition.
- The Fifth Assembly of the Lok Sabha, lower house of the Parliament of India, began in New Delhi.
- Argentine serial killer Robledo Puch, committed his first murders, shooting and killing a discotheque owner and a night watchman in Buenos Aires. Over a period of less than a year before his arrest on February 4, 1972, Puch, nicknamed "El ángel negro" ("The Black Angel") would commit 11 murders.
- The 672nd and last original episode of The Red Skelton Hour was telecast, bringing an end to the show after 20 seasons. Skelton's comedy and variety show had made its debut on September 30, 1951.
- Died: Jean-Pierre Monseré, 22, Belgian bicyclist and the reigning UCI World Cycling Champion, was struck and killed by a car while riding in a race in the town of Retie.

== March 16, 1971 (Tuesday) ==
- Trygve Bratteli formed a new government in Norway after the March 2 resignation of the prime minister Per Borten in a scandal. Bratteli's Labor Party (Arbeidarpartiet) was one short of a majority in the Storting, with 74 of the 150 seasts.
- Prohibitions against the advocacy, sale and use of birth control in Italy were abrogated by the Constitutional Court of Italy abrogated the articles of the Penal Code forbidding the propaganda, the sale and the use of the means.

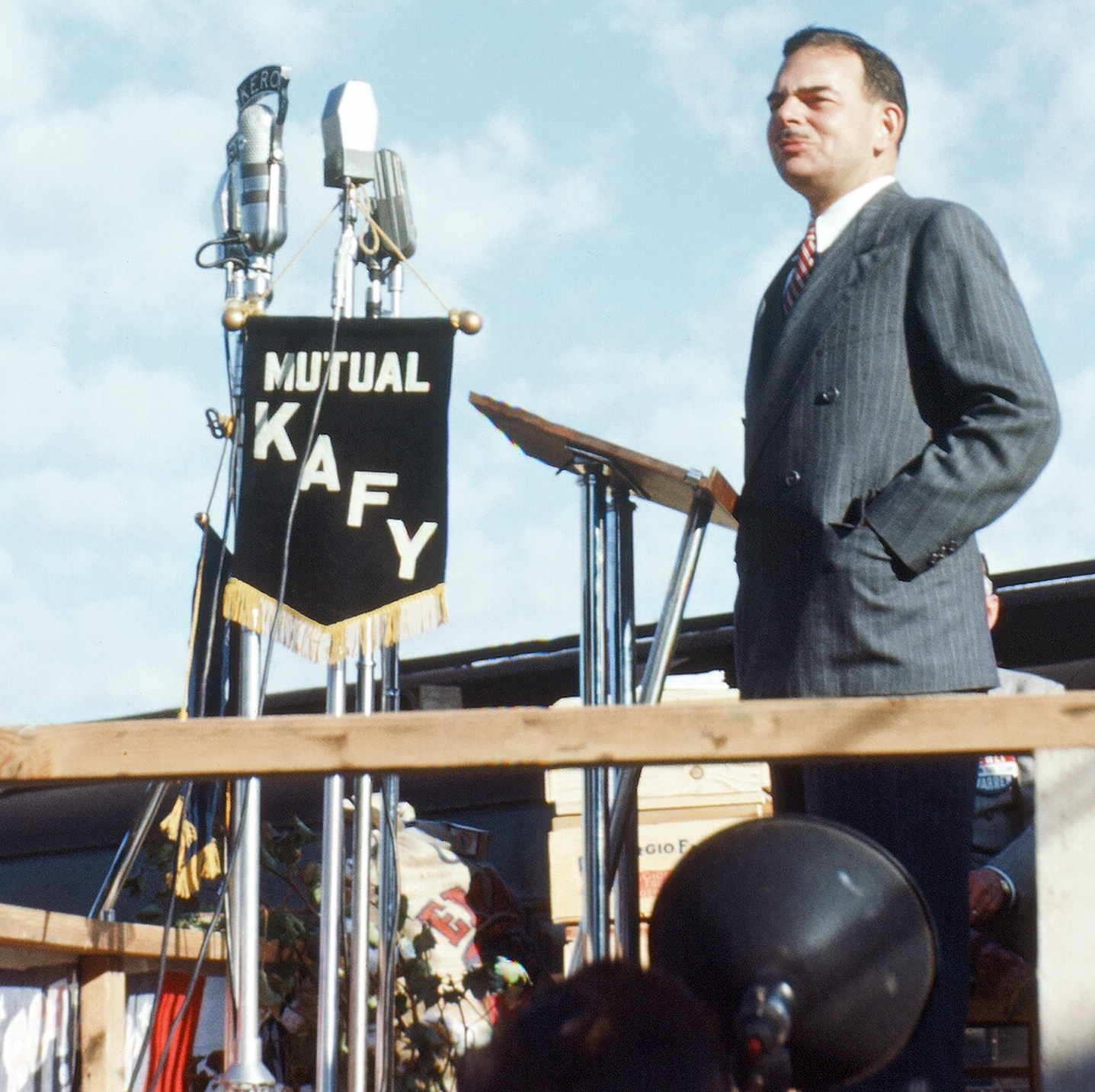
Dewey running for president in 1948

- Britain's Secretary for Social Services announced that health warnings against smoking would be issued on cigarette packs in the UK starting in the summer. Sir Keith Joseph announced in the House of Commons that an agreement had come after negotiations with tobacco manufacturers with the statement, in red, "Warning by H.M. Government: Smoking can damage your health."
- Israel's Prime Minister Golda Meir, whose Israeli Labor Party (HaAvoda) held a slim majority (62 out of 120 seats) in the Knesset survived a vote of confidence over her proposal for peace with the Arab nations, but only after all the members of the opposition walked out of the session in protest of Meir's successful move to require a roll call vote rather than a secret ballot. The vote in her favor was 62 to 0.
- The movie Sacco e Vanzetti, directed by Giuliano Montaldo was released in Italy. A version dubbed in English would later be released in the United States on October 6.
- Born: Alan Tudyk, American TV, film and voice actor; in El Paso, Texas
- Died:
  - Thomas E. Dewey, 68, American politician who had been widely expected by the press to be the candidate who would win the 1948 U.S. presidential election, died in his room at the Seaview Hotel in Bal Harbour, Florida. Dewey, who had visited the Miami Heart Institute the day before and was preparing to depart for Washington to attend a party at the White House as the guest of President Nixon, was found dead after failing to show up for his ride to the airport.
  - Bebe Daniels, 70, American film actress and later a television star in the UK

== March 17, 1971 (Wednesday) ==
- Details of the "Golpe Borghese", the unsuccessful attempt by former Prince Junio Valerio Borghese on December 7, 1970, to seize the nation's television and radio networks and stage a coup d’état to overthrow the government, were revealed by Italy's Interior Minister, Franco Restivo, to the Chamber of Deputies. Restivo confirmed news that had been already made public by the Communist newspaper Paese Sera. Subsequently, police raided 32 suspected ultraright political groups.

== March 18, 1971 (Thursday) ==
- Two hundred people were killed in Peru by a landslide at an isolated mining camp in Chungar, located in the Andes mountains about 55 miles (89 km) north of the capital at Lima. At about 8:30 in the morning, a light earthquake caused part of a mountain peak to collapse and the debris fell into Yanawayin Lake above the camp. The displacement of water, in turn, caused an avalanche of water, mud and rocks to rain down at the camp, inhabited by about 1,000 miners and their families. Chungar, located at an altitude of 12,000 feet (3,700 m) was reachable only by "an 8-hour journey by foot from the nearest town".
- The U.S. Air Force airlifted over 1,000 South Vietnamese troops out of Laos, as the end drew near for Operation Lam Son 719 operation that had started on February 8 as part of the "Vietnamization" of the war. Two days later, another 2,000 retreated from the approach of North Vietnamese forces, leaving 8,000 soldiers still in Laos.
- Died: Leland Hayward, 68, stage and film producer

== March 19, 1971 (Friday) ==
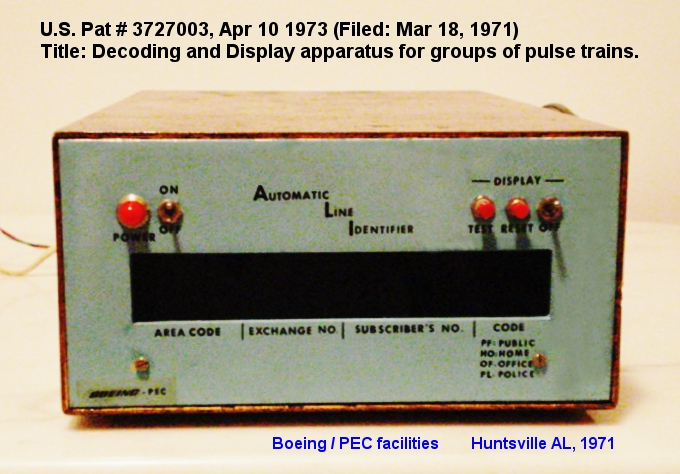
The first Caller ID system

- Greek-born American inventor Theodore Paraskevakos filed the patent application for what would become Caller ID, his invention of transmission and receipt of electronic data (in the form of a signal pulse train to represent a numerical digit) through telephone lines, with a box that he called the Automatic Line Identifier to display a phone number. U.S. Patent No. 3,727,003 would be granted to Paraskevakos on April 10, 1973.
- President's Rule was imposed in the Indian state of Mysore (now Karnataka) by President V. V. Giri. Local rule would be permitted one year and one day later, on March 20, 1972.
- Argentina's President Roberto Levingston dismissed Air Force Brigadier General Ezequiel Martinez from the position of Chairman of the Argentine Joint Chiefs of Staff, stating that Martinez had committed "a disciplinary infraction of grave character", not otherwise specified. The Argentine armed forces would then plan the removal of Levingston as president, which took place three days later.
- In Rome, the deputy prosecutor Claudio Vitalone issued four arrest warrants for Golpe Borghese, bringing charges against Junio Valerio Borghese and three of his accomplices, Major Mario Rosa, Lieutenant Sandro Saccucci and building contractor Remo Orlandini. Borghese, nicknamed "The Black Prince" by the press, eluded capture by fleeing to political asylum in Spain, which was governed by the right-wing President Francisco Franco.
- The Professional Hoc-Soc Tournament, the first major indoor soccer competition among major U.S. professional soccer teams, took place between four of the five members of the North American Soccer League (NASL), at St. Louis. The four games, played prior to the opening of the NASL's regular outdoor season and each lasting 30 minutes instead of 90, took place at the St. Louis Arena in a field that fit the same dimensions as the ice hockey rink used by the St. Louis Blues, hence the name "Hoc-Soc". In the final, the Dallas Tornado defeated the Rochester Lancers, 3 to 0. The losers of the semi-finals played for third place as the St. Louis Stars beat the Washington Darts, 2 to 0. The Atlanta Chiefs did not participate. The total attendance was 1,265 and the event was not repeated.
- Born:
  - Julien MacDonald, Welsh fashion designer, in Merthyr Tydfil;
  - Kirsty Williams, leader of the Welsh Liberal Democrats, in Taunton, England
- Died: Jean-Marie Beaudet, 63, Canadian conductor, organist, pianist, radio producer, and music educator

== March 20, 1971 (Saturday) ==
- The fourth "Senior Bowl" spy drone mission by the United States Air Force, an attempt to photograph China's Lop Nor nuclear test site with a high altitude unmanned drone, malfunctioned and crashed, marking the fourth consecutive failure of the program. Unlike the first three unsuccessful missions, the fourth Lockheed D-21B drone was recovered by the Chinese when its wreckage was located in the Yunnan province, ending the secret operation entirely. On July 23, the Lockheed D-21B program would be canceled without having brought back any information.
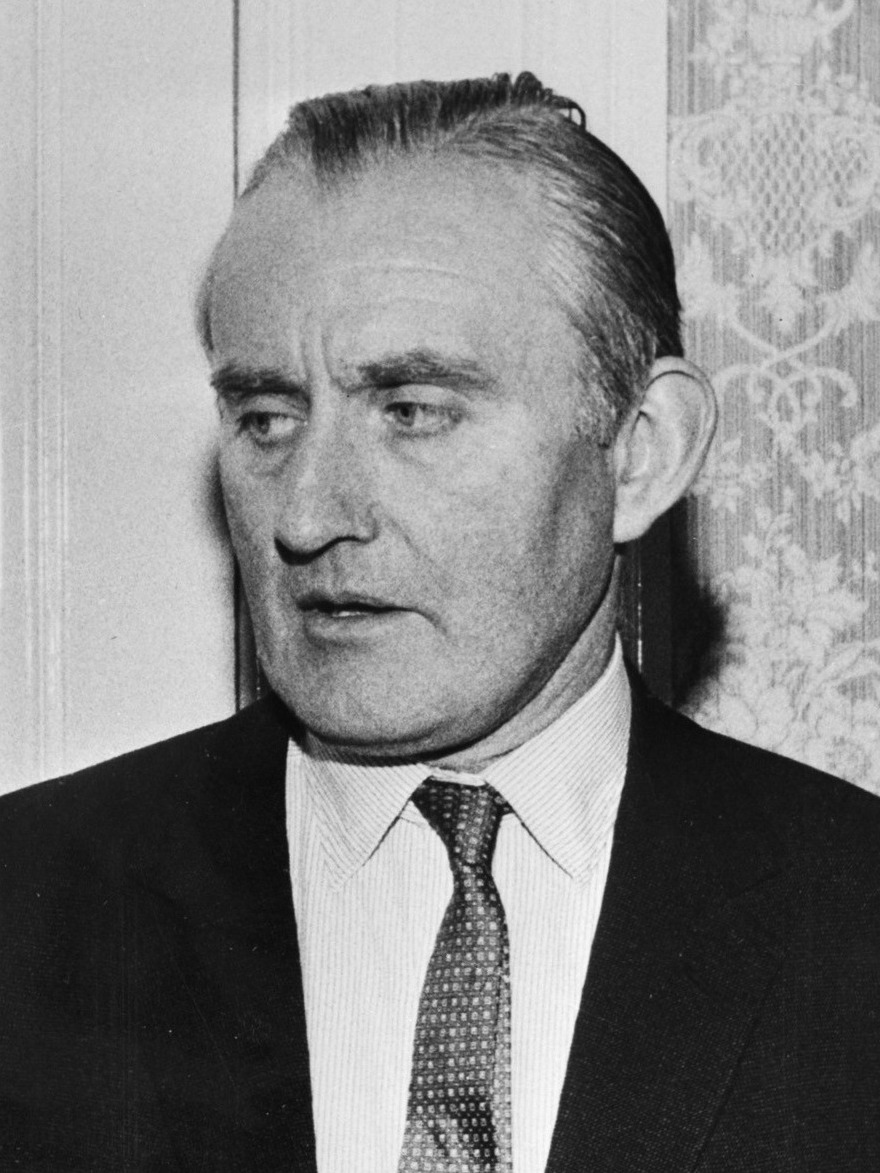
The last two Prime Ministers of Northern Ireland
- James Chichester-Clark resigned as Prime Minister of Northern Ireland and as leader of the Ulster Unionist Party, after being frustrated at the lack of control allowed to him by the rest of the United Kingdom in troops provided by Great Britain. Chichester-Clark was replaced three days later by Brian Faulkner, who would be the last Northern Ireland Prime Minister before the position was abolished on March 30, 1972.
- A tribunal in Rome indicted Pietro Valpreda and other members of the Circolo anarchio 22 marzo group for the 1969 Piazza Fontana bombing that killed 17 people and injured 88, along with some of Valpreda's relatives and the neofascist Stefano Delle Chiaie, for false testimony given to investigators.

== March 21, 1971 (Sunday) ==
- United Nations Secretary General U Thant celebrated UN Earth Day with an address on the need for human beings to protect "Spaceship Earth".
- Two platoons of the U.S. Army First Cavalry of the U.S. Army's Americal Division, consisting of about 53 soldiers, refused orders from their commanding officer to advance to the Laotian border in South Vietnam to secure damaged equipment, including a downed helicopter and some damaged armored personnel carriers. Bravo Troop of the First Squadron had lost four men to enemy rocket attacks; the company commander was relieved of duty. The men then resumed their regular duty, and the commanding general in charge of the division said the next day that no disciplinary action would be taken. "I suppose if I went by the book, we could take them out and shoot them for refusing an order in the face of the enemy," Brigadier General John G. Hill, Jr., told reporters, "but they're back in the field, doing their duty. I don't think it should be blown out of proportion." In August 1969, a company of the 21st Regiment of the 196th Brigade of the Americal division had refused to comply with orders, resulting in their commanding officer being relieved of duty.
- Died: Kyūya Fukada, 67, Japanese writer and mountaineer

== March 22, 1971 (Monday) ==
- Pakistan's President Yahya Khan announced after negotiations with East Pakistan leader Mujibur Rahman that the opening day of the National Assembly, which had been postponed to March 25, would be postponed a second time. On March 1, the opening day of the new National Assembly had been pushed back, bringing protests throughout East Pakistan, separated from West Pakistan by over 1,000 miles of territory of India.
- After temporarily being named the "Bay State Patriots", the NFL's Boston-area team announced that it would assume the name "New England Patriots" in anticipation of the opening of its stadium in Foxborough, Massachusetts.
- Born:
  - Iben Hjejle, Danish film and TV actress; in Copenhagen
  - Keegan-Michael Key, American TV actor; in Southfield, Michigan
- Died: Martin Bodmer, 71, Swiss bibliophile

== March 23, 1971 (Tuesday) ==
- The Soviet Union exploded three 15-kiloton "clean bomb" atomic weapons to create a lake as part of the building of a canal between the Pechora River and the Kama river, and demonstrating its Nuclear Explosions for the National Economy program. The Yadernoe-Ozero lake was filled by the Beryozovka River and measures 2,300 feet (700 m) by 1,150 feet (350 m). After considering that hundreds of similar atomic explosions would be necessary to excavate a canal, the Soviet government would abandon the canal completely in 1977.
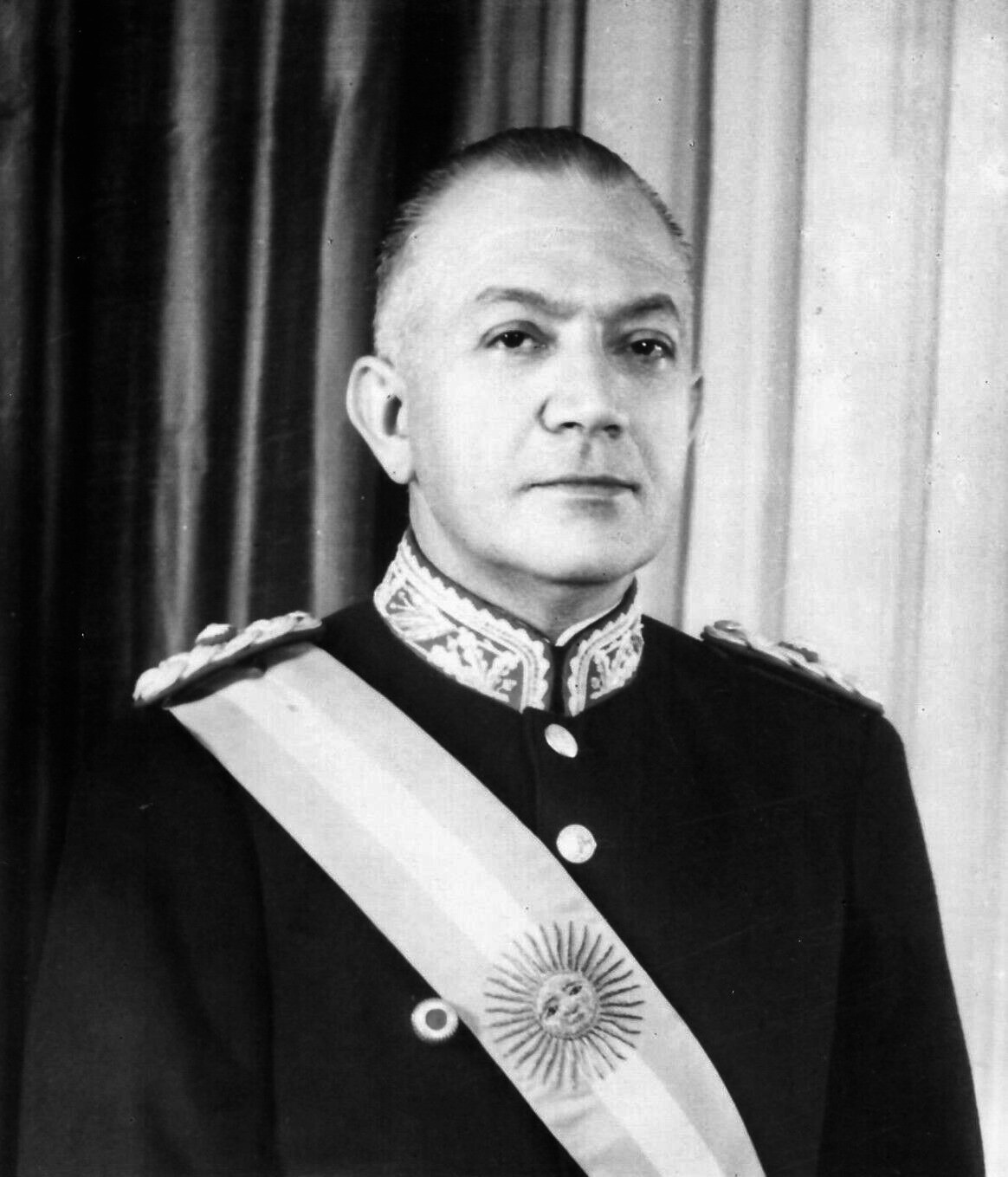
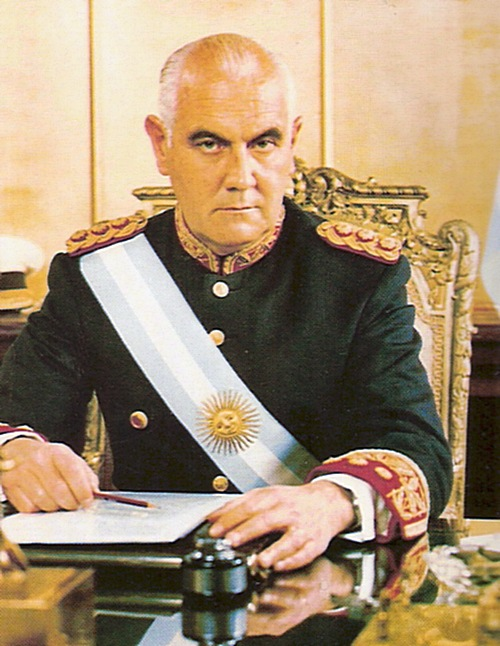
Argentina ex-president Levingston and replacement president Lanusse
- Hours after firing Army Lieutenant-General Alejandro Lanusse as Chief of Staff of the Argentine Armed Forces, Argentina's President Roberto Levingston was himself removed by the Lanusse and the commanders of the Argentine Navy and Argentine Air Force. Three days earlier, Levinston had dismissed the South American nation's Chairman of the Joint Chiefs of Staff, Brigadier General Ezequiel Martinez.
- With a 401 to 19 vote in favor in the U.S. House of Representatives, Congress approved submitting the proposed 26th Amendment to the Constitution, lowering the voting age nationwide to 18 years old, to the states for ratification. The U.S. Senate had approved the amendment unanimously (94 to 0) on March 10. The amendment would be ratified more quickly than any other U.S. constitutional change before or since, becoming effective 100 days later on July 1.
- The first election for the non-voting District of Columbia delegate to the U.S. House of Representatives was held, as Walter E. Fauntroy defeated two challengers by an overwhelming majority.
- The government of India's Kerala state issued regulations providing for a simplified version of Malayalam script, used to write the main language of Kerala, Malayalam, spoken by 96% of Kerala's 21 million residents. The new alphabet, which went into effect on all printed matter on April 15, had only 57 letters, a reduction from over 1,000 printed glyphs.
- The 274th and final episode of the TV sitcom The Beverly Hillbillies was broadcast on CBS, bringing an end to the show's run after nine seasons. In its first season, it had been the number-one rated TV show in the U.S. and finished in the top 20 for all but its final season. A syndicated columnist on the staff of TV Scout noted "You can rejoice or feel sorrow, depending on your reaction to this show, which was often funnier than it was credited with being. Anyway, Jethro comes home, Mike Minor reveals he's not really named Audobon-Getty-Crocket and, at show's end, Elly May still needs a husband." The show was among many that were casualties of the "rural purge" by CBS and not renewed for another season after their filming had been completed, so most of the shows ended abruptly without a farewell episode.
- Born: Karen McDougal, American model and actress, Playboy magazine's Playmate of the Year in 1998; in Merrillville, Indiana
- Died: Basil Dearden, 60, English film director, was killed in a car accident.

== March 24, 1971 (Wednesday) ==
- The Washington Post broke the story of the FBI's COINTELPRO program of spying on U.S. citizens after verifying the authenticity of the documents stolen by the Citizens' Commission to Investigate the FBI on March 8.
- The Strasbourg Agreement Concerning the International Patent Classification was signed, establishing a common classification for patents for invention, inventors’ certificates, utility models and utility certificates, known as the “International Patent Classification” (IPC).
- Federal funding for development of the Boeing 2707, more commonly known as the "SST" (for Supersonic transport) was ended by a vote of the U.S. Senate by a vote of 51 to 46, bringing an immediate halt to the project by Boeing and the layoff of 7,000 employees. The U.S. House of Representatives had narrowly voted, 215 to 204, to halt further development of the SST, though the Nixon Administration had pushed for the project in hopes that a favorable U.S. Senate vote would send the budget bill back to the House for reconsideration.
- The television western The Virginian broadcast its 249th and final episode, ending a nine-season run that began on September 19, 1962. In its final season, NBC had decided to change the premise of the series and to rename it The Men from Shiloh.
- The U.S. Congress passed the budget for the 1972 fiscal year, eliminating all federal funding for the Lockheed L-2000 (more commonly called the SST), the American attempt at building a supersonic transport aircraft to rival the Anglo-French Concorde.
- Died: Arne Jacobsen, 69, Danish architect and designer

== March 25, 1971 (Thursday) ==
- The Pakistani Army began Operation Searchlight, the genocide of the Bengali residents of East Pakistan, at 11:30 p.m., after President Agha Muhammad Yahya Khan, whose government was based in West Pakistan, voided election results that gave East Pakistan's Awami League the controlling majority in parliament. Earlier in the day, Yahya Khan had broken off further discussions with Bengali leader Mujibur Rahman and departed the East Pakistani capital of Dhaka to return to Karachi in the west.
- Pakistani troops killed 10 teachers and 34 students at Dhaka University.
- Yugoslavia's President Tito arrived in Rome for a state visit as the guest of Italy's President Giuseppe Saragat, with the thousands of policemen and soldiers called out for Tito's protection against protesters. Right-wing nationalists and monarchists had opposed the visit because Yugoslavia had taken the former Italian territory in Dalmatia and Trieste after World War II.

== March 26, 1971 (Friday) ==
- Sheikh Mujibur Rahman, leader of the Bangladesh Awami League, was arrested by the Pakistan army. Before his arrest, he sent a message to other party leaders, confirming that East Pakistan should proclaim its independence. The Proclamation of Bangladeshi Independence of East Pakistan from the rest of Pakistan followed in an announcement by Awami League leader M. A. Hannan, who spoke on behalf of Sheikh Mujibur Rahman, from Kalurghat Radio Station in Chittagong proclaiming that the new nation would be called Bangladesh. The formal Proclamation of Independence was signed on April 10 at Mujibnagar and ratified by the Constituent Assembly of Bangladesh on April 17.
- In the first few days of Operation Searchlight, the Pakistani Army used artillery and machine guns against unarmed civilians in Bangladesh. Reports from the press in neighboring India on March 27 said that more than 10,000 Bengalis had been killed by artillery and tank fire, and that the Pakistani Air Force had bombed the smaller city of Cumilla because it was under control of the Bengali forces.
- Nihat Erim was confirmed as the new Prime Minister of Turkey after being asked on March 19 by President Cevdet Sunay to form a new government.
- The Fukushima Daiichi Nuclear Power Plant began operation in Japan, supplying electric power to the Fukushima Prefecture for almost 40 years. On March 11, 2011, a 9.1 magnitude earthquake and flooding from a tsunami would severely damage the plant and release radiation contaminating the area.
- General Alejandro Lanusse was sworn in as the new President of Argentina after being part of a three-man military junta that had overthrown President Roberto Levingston on March 23.
- Born: Erick Morillo, Colombian-born American record producer; in Cartagena (d. 2020)

== March 27, 1971 (Saturday) ==
- In the wake of the Pakistani Army's campaign to eliminate the Bengali population of East Pakistan, particular adherents to Hinduism, India opened its eastern border to admit millions of Bengali refugees to camps in the Indian state of West Bengal.

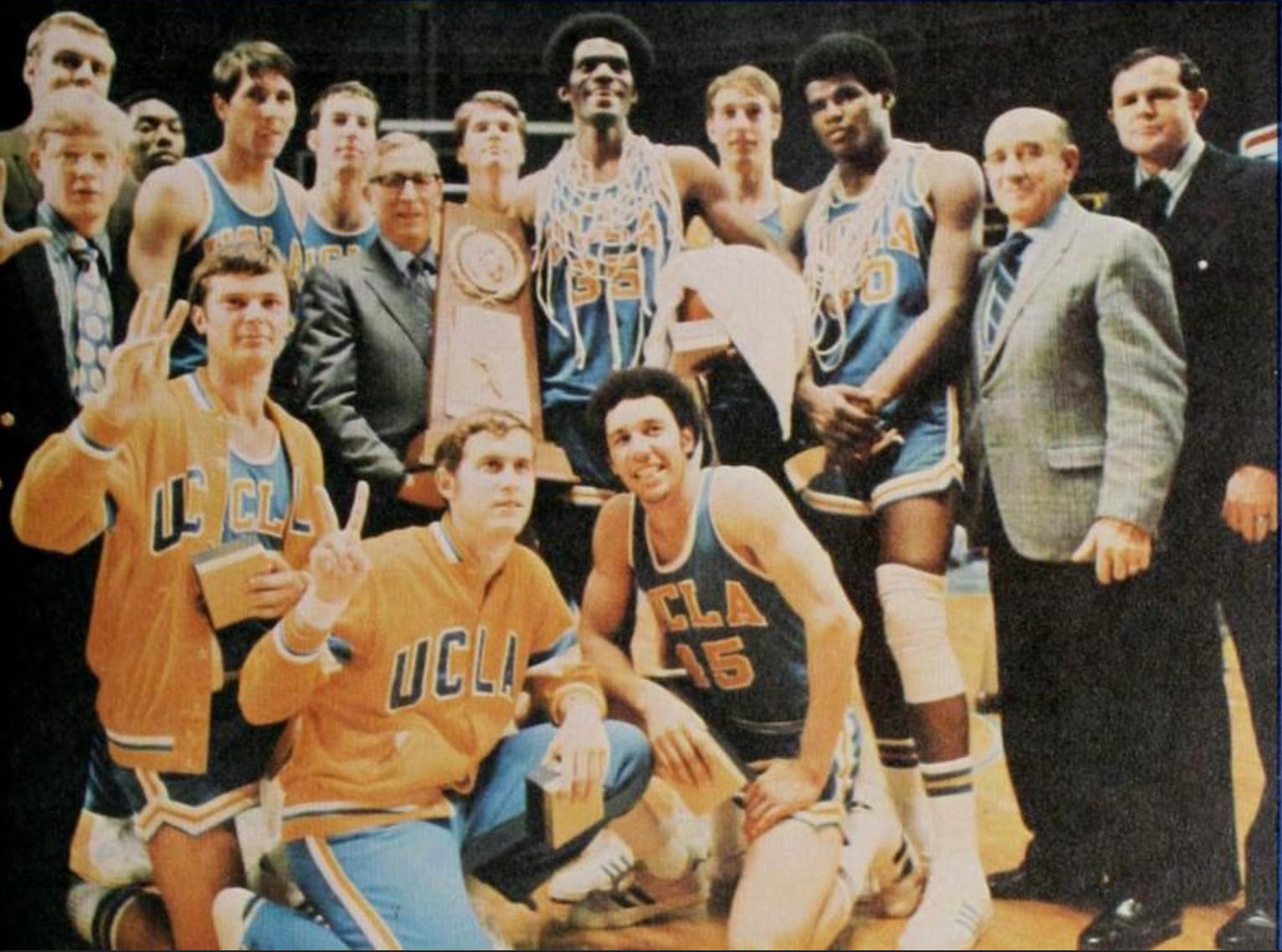
Champion UCLA Bruins

- The UCLA Bruins defeated the Villanova University Wildcats, 68 to 62, to win the NCAA college basketball championship game at the Houston Astrodome, in front of a record crowd of 31,765 people.
- East Pakistan (now Bangladesh) independence was affirmed in a declaration by Pakistani Army Major Ziaur Rahman who made the announcement from the Kalurghat Radio Station in Chittagong.
- At the Stade Olympique Yves-du-Manoir, Colombes, Wales defeated France, 9–5, to take the rugby union "grand slam", the defeat of the other four nations by one of the participants in the Five Nations Championship.
- Born:
  - Nathan Fillion, Canadian-born American TV and film actor known for Firefly, Castle, and The Rookie; in Edmonton
  - David Coulthard, Scottish Formula One racer driver; in Twynholm, Kirkcudbrightshire,

== March 28, 1971 (Sunday) ==
- Thirty-three of the 44 crew of the oil tanker SS Texaco Oklahoma were killed when the ship foundered and sank 100 miles (160 km) off of the coast of Sandbridge, Virginia. The Liberian-registered freighter Sasstown rescued 11 survivors who had been able to evacuate into a life boat at 5:30 in the morning and the ship went down 30 minutes later.
- The 1,068th and final edition of The Ed Sullivan Show was broadcast in the U.S. after a run of 23 seasons that had started on June 20, 1948. In explaining the demise of the show, Sullivan commented "Vaudeville on television finally died out. Frankly, I always feared it would happen and then it did... I was reluctant about admitting what was wrong. But Sylvia, my wife, sensed the trend instantly. She said to me, 'Ed, people don't want it anymore. You'll have to get yourself a new idea." Reruns of Sullivan's variety show continued on Sunday nights until June 6.
- Hogan's Heroes ended its six-year run on CBS.

== March 29, 1971 (Monday) ==
- U.S. Army First Lieutenant William Calley was found guilty of 22 murders in the My Lai massacre and was sentenced to life in prison by a court-martial. The U.S. Army would reduce Calley's sentence to 20 years on August 20 and he would be paroled on September 10, 1976, after serving one-quarter of the 20-year sentence.
- Yugoslavian president Josip Broz Tito became the first Communist head of government to be granted a papal audience, as he was received privately by Pope Paul VI for 75 minutes. In 1967, the Pope had received the Soviet head of state, Nikolai V. Podgorny in a private visit.
- A jury in Los Angeles jury recommended the death penalty for Charles Manson and three of his female followers who had participated in the Tate-La Bianca murders in 1969.
- On the same day that the verdicts were announced, the decomposed body of Ronald Hughes, one of the attorneys for Charles Manson prior to his disappearance on November 28, was found in a remote gorge in Ventura County, California.
- The final episode of Mayberry R.F.D., a continuation of The Andy Griffith Show after the departure of Andy Griffith and Ronnie Howard, was telecast, bringing the series to an end after four years.
- Born: José Luis Rodríguez Pittí, Panamanian writer and photographer, in Panama City.

== March 30, 1971 (Tuesday) ==
- The first Starbucks coffee shop chain was opened, founded in Seattle, Washington in the U.S.
- The Congressional Black Caucus was founded by the 13 African-American members of Congress (Shirley Chisholm, William L. Clay Sr., George W. Collins, John Conyers, Ronald Dellums, Charles Diggs, Augustus F. Hawkins, Ralph Metcalfe, Parren Mitchell, Robert Nix, Charles Rangel, Louis Stokes, and Washington, D.C.'s non-voting delegate Walter E. Fauntroy
- The 24th Congress of the Communist Party of the Soviet Union opened in Moscow at 10:00 in the morning, under the CPSU's schedule of a gathering party members from across the Soviet Union every five years to approve the Communist leadership's recommendations for policy. The gathering of 4,949 delegates was held in the ballroom of the Hall of St. George at the Grand Kremlin Palace.
- Six hijackers, university students in Marawi who identified themselves as supporters of Mao Zedong, hijacked a Philippine Airlines BAC One-Eleven after takeoff from Manila and diverted it to Hong Kong, then to Guangzhou in mainland China. The People's Republic of China, whose government said that the incident was the first case of air piracy there, kept the six hijackers and allowed the jet, its crew of five and its 19 passengers to fly back to Manila the next day.
- Born: Carlton Meyers, Italian basketball player, in London
- Died:
  - Hardan al-Tikriti, 46, Defense Minister and one of the two Deputy Presidents of Iraq until being sent into exile on October 15, 1970, by the Ba'athist Party, was assassinated in Kuwait City by two gunmen. Tikriti was sitting in a car after the Iraqi ambassador to Kuwait drove him to a clinic for a medical checkup.
  - Dale Morgan, 56, American historian, died of cancer.

== March 31, 1971 (Wednesday) ==
- All 65 people on Aeroflot Flight 1969 were killed when one of the wings on the Antonov An-10 turboprop failed as the plane was approaching Lugansk in the Ukrainian SSR at the end of a flight from Kuybyshev in the Russian SFSR.
- The Poseidon submarine-launched nuclear missile was first deployed for 31 U.S. nuclear submarines.
- Japanese serial killer Kiyoshi Ōkubo raped and murdered 17-year old Miyako Tsuda, in the first of eight rapist murders over less than six weeks. He would be arrested on May 10 and hanged in prison in 1976.
- South Africa's Prime Minister John Vorster announced at a news conference that he would seek the approval for a new flag of South Africa.
- The first Eisenhower dollar coins were minted, on presses at the U.S. Mint branch in San Francisco.
- Born:
  - Craig McCracken, American animator, director, and creator of The Powerpuff Girls and Foster's Home for Imaginary Friends.
  - Ewan McGregor, Scottish actor best known for playing Obi-Wan Kenobi in the Star Wars prequel trilogy, Mark Renton in the Trainspotting films and Roman Sionis/Black Mask in Birds of Prey (2020 film).
