= Hylozoism =

Philosophical doctrine which holds that all matter is alive

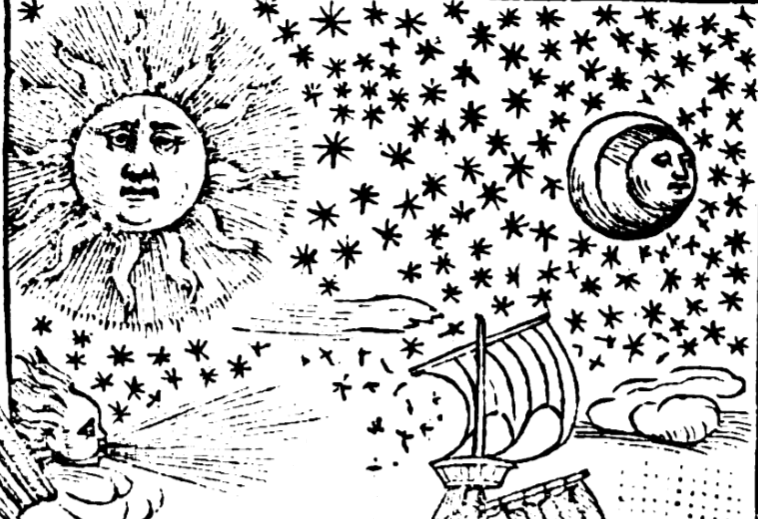
Sphera volgare, featuring the Sun, the Moon, the winds and the stars as living. Woodcut illustration from an edition of De sphaera mundi, Venice, 1537.

Hylozoism is the philosophical doctrine according to which all matter is alive or animated, either in itself or as participating in the action of a superior principle, usually the world-soul (anima mundi). The theory holds that matter is unified with life or spiritual activity. The word is a 17th-century term formed from the Greek words ὕλη (hyle: "wood, matter") and ζωή (zoē: "life"), which was coined by the English Platonist philosopher Ralph Cudworth in 1678.

== In Ancient Greek philosophy ==
Hylozoism in Western philosophy can be traced back to ancient Greece. The Milesian philosophers Thales, Anaximander, and Anaximenes, can be described as hylozoists. Philosopher David Skrbina states that hylozoism was implicit in early Greek philosophy, and was not a doctrine that was typically challenged. "For the Milesians, matter (hyle) possessed life (zoe) as an essential quality. Something like hylozoism was simply accepted as a brute condition of reality." Though hylozoism was implicit in early Greek thought, the philosopher Heraclitus specifically used the term zoe, making him explicitly hylozoist. The hylozoism of the pre-Socratic philosophers such as Thales and Heraclitus influenced later Greek philosophers such as Plato, Aristotle, and the Stoics.

Though hylozoism was common in ancient Greek thought, the term had not been coined yet. In modern literature, hylozoism has tended to carry a negative connotation, and labeling a Greek philosopher as a hylozoist might be a vague disparagement of their thought.

== Renaissance period and early modernity ==
During the Renaissance period in Western Europe, humanist scholars and philosophers such as Bernardino Telesio, Paracelsus, Cardanus, and Giordano Bruno revived the doctrine of hylozoism. The latter, for example, held a form of Christian pantheism wherein God is conceived as the source, cause, medium, and end of all things, and therefore all things are participatory in the ongoing Godhead. Bruno's ideas were so radical that he was excommunicated by the Catholic Church with the accusation of heresy, as well as from a few Protestant denominations, and he was eventually burned at the stake for various other beliefs that were regarded as heretical. Telesio, on the other hand, began from an Aristotelian basis and, through radical empiricism, came to believe that a living force was what informed all matter. Instead of the intellectual universals of Aristotle, he believed that life generated form.

In the Kingdom of England, some of the Cambridge Platonists approached hylozoism as well. Both Henry More and Ralph Cudworth (the Younger, 1617–1688), through their reconciliation of Platonic idealism with Christian doctrines of deific generation, came to see the divine lifeforce as the informing principle in the world. Thus, like Bruno, but not nearly to the extreme, they saw God's generative impulse as giving life to all things that exist. Accordingly, Cudworth, the most systematic metaphysician of the Cambridge Platonist tradition, fought hylozoism. His work is primarily a critique of what he took to be the two principal forms of atheism—materialism and hylozoism.

Cudworth singled out Hobbes not only as a defender of the hylozoic atheism "which attributes life to matter", but also as one going beyond it and defending "hylopathian atheism, which attributes all to matter." Cudworth attempted to show that Hobbes had revived the doctrines of Protagoras and was therefore subject to the criticisms which Plato had deployed against Protagoras in the Theaetetus. On the side of hylozoism, Strato of Lampsacus was the official target. However, Cudworth's Dutch friends had reported to him the views which Spinoza was circulating in manuscript. Cudworth remarks in his Preface that he would have ignored hylozoism had he not been aware that a new version of it would shortly be published.

Spinoza's idealism also tends toward hylozoism. In order to hold a balance even between matter and mind, Spinoza combined materialistic with pantheistic hylozoism, by demoting both to mere attributes of the one infinite substance. Although specifically rejecting identity in inorganic matter, he, like the Cambridge Platonists, sees a life force within, as well as beyond, all matter.

== Contemporary views ==
Immanuel Kant presented arguments against hylozoism in the third chapter of his 1786 book Metaphysische Anfangsgründe der Naturwissenschaften ("First Metaphysical Principles of Natural Science") and also in his 1781 book Kritik der reinen Vernunft ("Critique of Pure Reason"). Yet, in our times, scientific hylozoism – whether modified, or keeping the trend to make all beings conform to some uniform pattern, to which the concept was adhered in modernity by Herbert Spencer, Hermann Lotze, and Ernst Haeckel – was often called upon as a protest against a mechanistic worldview.

In the 19th century, Haeckel developed a materialist form of hylozoism, specially against Rudolf Virchow's and Hermann von Helmholtz's mechanical views of humans and nature. In his Die Welträtsel of 1899 (The Riddle of the Universe 1901), Haeckel upheld a unity of organic and inorganic nature and derived all actions of both types of matter from natural causes and laws. Thus, his form of hylozoism reverses the usual course by maintaining that living and nonliving things are essentially the same, and by erasing the distinction between the two and stipulating that they behave by a single set of laws.

In contrast, the Argentine-German neurobiological tradition terms hylozoic hiatus all of the parts of nature which can only behave lawfully or nomically and, upon such a feature, are described as lying outside of minds and amid them – i.e. extramentally. Thereby the hylozoic hiatus becomes contraposed to minds deemed able of behaving semoviently, i.e. able of inaugurating new causal series (semovience). Hylozoism in this contemporary neurobiological tradition is thus restricted to the portions of nature behaving nomically inside the minds, namely the minds' sensory reactions (Christfried Jakob's "sensory intonations") whereby minds react to the stimuli coming from the hylozoic hiatus or extramental realm.

Martin Buber too takes an approach that is quasi-hylozoic. By maintaining that the essence of things is identifiable and separate, although not pre-existing, he can see a soul within each thing.

The French Pythagorean and Rosicrucian alchemist, François Jollivet-Castelot (1874–1937), established a hylozoic esoteric school which combined the insight of spagyrics, chemistry, physics, transmutations and metaphysics. He published many books, including the 1896 publication "L’Hylozoïsme, l’alchimie, les chimistes unitaires". In his view there was no difference between spirit and matter except for the degree of frequency and other vibrational conditions.

The Mormon theologian Orson Pratt taught a form of hylozoism.

Alice A. Bailey wrote a book called The Consciousness of the Atom.

Influenced by Alice A. Bailey, Charles Webster Leadbeater, and their predecessor Madame Blavatsky, Henry T. Laurency produced voluminous writings describing a hylozoic philosophy.

Influenced by George Ivanovich Gurdjieff, the English philosopher and mathematician John Godolphin Bennett, in his four-volume work The Dramatic Universe and his book Energies, developed a six-dimensional framework in which matter-energy takes on 12 levels of hylozoic quality.

The English cybernetician Stafford Beer adopted a hylozoism position, arguing that it could be defended scientifically and expending much effort on Biological computing in consequence. This is described as Beer's "spiritually-charged awe at the activity and powers of nature in relation to our inability to grasp them representationally". Beer claimed that "Nature does not need to make any detours; it does not just exceed our computational abilities, in effect it surpasses them in unimaginable ways. In a poem on the Irish Sea, Beer talks about nature as exceeding our capacities in way that we can only wonder at, ‘shocked’ and ‘dumbfounded.’" In partnership with his friend Gordon Pask, who was experimenting with various chemical and bio-chemical devices, he explored the possibility for intelligence to be developed in very simple network-complex systems. In one possibly unique experiment led by Pask, they found that such a structure would 'grow' a sensing organization in response to the stimuli of different audio inputs in about half a day.

Ken Wilber embraces hylozoism to explain subjective experience and provides terms describing the ladder of subjective experience experienced by entities from atoms up to Human beings in the upper left quadrant of his Integral philosophy chart.

Physicist Thomas Brophy, in The Mechanism Demands a Mysticism, embraces hylozoism as the basis of a framework for re-integrating modern physical science with perennial spiritual philosophy. Brophy coins two additional words to stand with hylozoism as the three possible ontological stances consistent with modern physics. Thus: hylostatism (universe is deterministic, thus "static" in a four-dimensional sense); hylostochastism (universe contains a fundamentally random or stochastic component); hylozoism (universe contains a fundamentally alive aspect).

Architect Christopher Alexander has put forth a theory of the living universe, where life is viewed as a pervasive patterning that extends to what is normally considered non-living things, notably buildings. He wrote a four-volume work called The Nature of Order which explicates this theory in detail.

Philosopher and ecologist David Abram articulates and elaborates a form of hylozoism grounded in the phenomenology of sensory experience. In his books Becoming Animal and The Spell of the Sensuous, Abram suggests that matter is never entirely passive in our direct experience, holding rather that material things actively "solicit our attention" or "call our focus," coaxing the perceiving body into an ongoing participation with those things. In the absence of intervening technologies, sensory experience is inherently animistic, disclosing a material field that is animate and self-organizing from the get-go. Drawing upon contemporary cognitive and natural science as well as the perspectival worldviews of diverse indigenous, oral cultures, Abram proposes a richly pluralist and story-based cosmology, in which matter is alive through and through. Such an ontology is in close accord, he suggests, with our spontaneous perceptual experience; it calls us back to our senses and to the primacy of the sensuous terrain, enjoining a more respectful and ethical relation to the more-than-human community of animals, plants, soils, mountains, waters and weather-patterns that materially sustains us.

Bruno Latour's actor-network theory, in the sociology of science, treats non-living things as active agents and thus bears some metaphorical resemblance to hylozoism.

The metaphysics of Gilles Deleuze has been described as a form of hylozoism, and is one of the main criticisms of the rhizome theory put forward by the Slovenian philosopher Slavoj Žižek.

== See also ==
- Animism
- Biocentric universe
- Biological naturalism
- Clinamen
- Daoism
- Hyle
- Hylomorphism
- Hylopathism
- Organicism
- Pantheism
- Pathetic fallacy
- Vitalism
