= Operation Mineral =

1979 Rhodesian military operation

- Part of Rhodesian Bush War
- Operation Mineral (Mozambique)
Date	9 June 1979
Location	Inchope, Manica Province, Mozambique
Result	Rhodesian victory

Belligerents
Zimbabwe Rhodesia	ZANLA

Commanders and leaders
(Zimbabwe Rhodesia) Unknown	Unknown

Units involved
Rhodesian Army: SAS	Unknown

Strength
Unknown	Unknown

Casualties and losses
2 killed	30 killed

Operation Mineral was a military operation launched by the Rhodesian Security Forces against communist guerrillas in Mozambique. The operation resulted in an ambush, which took place along a road close to Inchope in Manica Province, by the SAS on 9 June 1979. During the raid 30 guerrillas were killed by the special forces, who were also able to capture guerrilla intelligence documents and weapons as well once the ambush was finished. 2 Rhodesian soldiers, Private Rodrick Masendeke and Lance Corporal Cletos Takundwa were killed during the ambush.

== Bibliography ==
- Geldenhuys, Preller (2007). Rhodesian Air Force Operations with Air Strike Log. Durban, South Africa: Just Done Productions Publishing (published 13 July 2007). ISBN 978-1-920169-61-9. Archived from the original on 24 December 2014.
