= Clinamen =

Latin word for the swerve of atoms, or an inclination/bias

Clinamen (/klaɪˈneɪmən/; plural clinamina, derived from clinare, to incline) is the unpredictable swerve of atoms in the atomistic doctrine of Epicurus. This swerving, according to Lucretius, provides the "free will which living things throughout the world have". Lucretius never gives the primary cause of the deflections.

According to Lucretius, the unpredictable swerve occurs "at no fixed place or time":

When atoms move straight down through the void by their own weight, they deflect a bit in space at a quite uncertain time and in uncertain places, just enough that you could say that their motion has changed. But if they were not in the habit of swerving, they would all fall straight down through the depths of the void, like drops of rain, and no collision would occur, nor would any blow be produced among the atoms. In that case, nature would never have produced anything.

In his 1704 work Tale of a Tub, Jonathan Swift satirized the atomistic theory of Epicurus:

Epicurus modestly hoped that one time or other, a certain fortuitous concourse of all men's opinions—after perpetual justlings, the sharp with the smooth, the light and the heavy, the round and the square—would, by certain clinamina, unite in the notions of atoms and void, as these did in the originals of all things.

== See also ==
- Brownian motion – the random motion of particles suspended in a fluid
- Molecular chaos
