= Operation Panga =

RSF military operation

- Part of Rhodesian Bush War
Date	17 April 1971
Location	Mushenshi River, Zambia
Result	Rhodesian victory

Belligerents
Rhodesia	ZIPRA

Commanders and leaders
(Rhodesia) Maj. Peter Rich	Unknown

Units involved
Rhodesian Army: SAS; RhAF	Unknown

Strength
10 troopers	Unknown

Casualties and losses
None	1 killed 1 wounded

Operation Panga was a military operation launched by the Rhodesian Security Forces (RSF) against a camp belonging to the communist insurgent group, ZIPRA. The cadres camp was located on the Mushenshi River in Zambia.

== Background ==
At this point in the war Rhodesia's political and military position appeared to be a strong one. Nationalist guerrillas had been unable to make serious military inroads against Rhodesia. In the early 1970s the two main nationalist groups faced serious internal divisions, aid from the Organisation of African Unity was temporarily suspended in 1971 and 129 nationalists were expelled from Zambia after they were alleged to have plotted against President Kenneth Kaunda. Furthermore Britain's efforts to isolate Rhodesia economically had not forced major compromises from the Smith Government.

In 1971, Rhodesia joined Alcora Exercise, a secret defensive alliance for Southern Africa, formalised in 1970 by Portugal and South Africa. Alcora formalised and deepened the political and military co-operation between the three countries in the fight against the revolutionary insurgency in the territories of Rhodesia, Angola, Mozambique and South West Africa and in the prevention of possible external aggression to those territories from the hostile neighbouring countries.

== The Raid ==
On 17 April 1971 a ten-strong force from the Rhodesian SAS, supported by the Rhodesian Air Force (RhAF) attacked the ZIPRA camp. During the raid one cadre was killed and another was wounded. Once the SAS team had secured the camp the troopers discovered enemy intelligence whilst recovering the enemy’s equipment. All of this was then brought back to Rhodesia when the SAS team was picked up by air force helicopters.

== Bibliography ==
- Britannica (1972). Britannica Book of the Year 1972: Events of 1971. Chicago, Illinois: Encyclopædia Britannica, Inc.
- Geldenhuys, Preller (2007). Rhodesian Air Force Operations with Air Strike Log. Durban, South Africa: Just Done Productions Publishing (published 13 July 2007). ISBN 978-1-920169-61-9. Archived from the original on 24 December 2014.
