= Henry T. Laurency =

Swedish anonymous esoteric teacher

Henry T. Laurency was a Swedish anonymous esoteric teacher and expounder of Pythagorean hylozoism.

Laurency considered that the presentations of the esoteric knowledge which were made up to his time (by H. P. Blavatsky, C. W. Leadbeater, Annie Besant and Alice A. Bailey to mention the most prominent ones) were somewhat unsuitable for Westerners as their manner of presentation as well as their terminology and symbolism had more proximity to Eastern mentality. In his several books he therefore presents the esoteric knowledge using a modern, lucid terminology and mathematical nomenclature in order to render it more compatible to the Western mind.

== List of works ==
Works of Henry T. Laurency completely translated into English:

- The Philosopher's Stone
- The Knowledge of Reality
- The Way of Man
- Knowledge of Life One
- Knowledge of Life Two
- Knowledge of Life Three
- Knowledge of Life Four
- Knowledge of Life Five
