= Frances Phipps =

Canadian explorer

Frances Phipps was a Canadian, and the first woman who reached the North Pole (on April 5, 1971).

Phipps grew up in Ottawa, Ontario as Frances Coolin. She was married to the Canadian bush pilot "Weldy" Welland Phipps, who had been her flight instructor, and the couple had nine children. Along with her husband, she founded Atlas Aviation in Resolute Bay, Nunavut, which was at the time the most northerly charter air service in Canada.

The Phipps couple flew together to the North Pole in a Twin Otter ski plane, to install a radar beacon and to promote northern travel. Because no woman had been to the North Pole before, Frances' trip was included in the Guinness Book of World Records.

In 1972, Fran and Weldy bought a 48-foot sailboat, and for over a decade traveled the world by sea.

Phipps died in July 2013 at New Glasgow, Prince Edward Island.
