= Hylopathism =

Philosophical belief about sentience

In philosophy, hylopathism is the belief that some or all matter is sentient or that properties of matter in general give rise to subjective experience. It is opposed to the assertion that consciousness results exclusively from properties of specific types of matter, e.g. brain tissue.

== Etymology and specific definition ==
The term is relatively uncommon even in philosophical discussion, and is often erroneously equated with panpsychism despite notable differences between the two views, that are evident in the etymologies of the two words: "panpsychism" derives from the Greek pan, "all", and psyche, "soul" or "mind" (the terms consciousness and experience being preferred in philosophy), and implies the sentience of all things; hylopathism derives from hylo-, which is translated either as "matter" or "wood" depending on its context, and whose English equivalent is hyle, and pathos, "emotion" or "suffering" (and, by extension, experience). Hylopathism is thus not necessarily a belief in the universality of sentience, but rather in the derivation of sentience from matter.

== See also ==
- Hyle
- Leibniz
- Panpsychism
- Pathetic fallacy
- The Force
