= Preller Geldenhuys =

Rhodesian Air Force pilot and author (born 1943)

Wing Commander Preller Geldenhuys
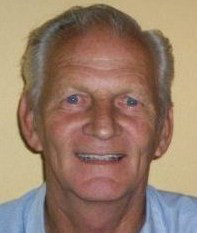
- Born: 20 February 1943; Enkeldoorn
- Citizenship: Rhodesia; Zimbabwe; Republic of South Africa; New Zealand
- Writing career
- Pen name: Prop Geldenhuys
- Subjects: Military, Air Force
- Military career
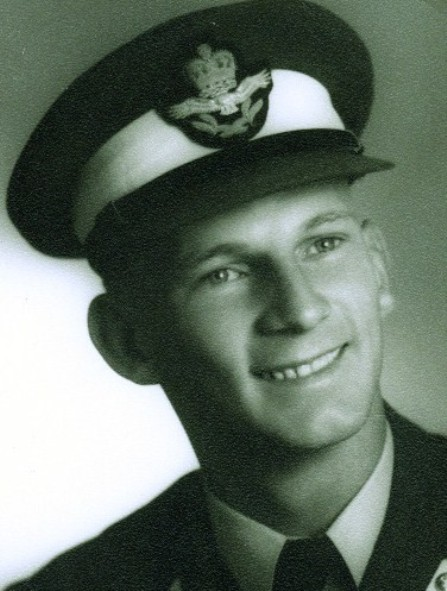
- Pupil Pilot
- Born: 20 February 1943
- Allegiance: Southern Rhodesia (1964–65); Rhodesia (1965–79); Zimbabwe Rhodesia (1979); Southern Rhodesia (1979–80); Zimbabwe
- Branch: Rhodesian Air Force; Air Force of Zimbabwe
- Service years: 1964–1982
- Rank: Wing Commander
- Service number: 4117
- Units: No. 1 Squadron; No. 2 Squadron; No. 4 Squadron; No. 5 Squadron
- Other work: Masonite

(Prop) Preller Geldenhuys was a pilot in the Rhodesian Air Force. He left Rhodesia (then Zimbabwe) in 1982 and began a new career in South Africa. After retiring, he became an author.

== Air Force ==
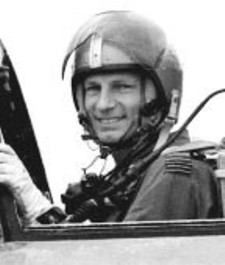
Prop - Hunter cockpit

Geldenhuys joined the Royal Rhodesian Air Force in March 1962 as a general duties pilot on No 16 Pilot Training Course. After being awarded his Wings he was posted to No. 4 Squadron to fly Provost aircraft, then to No. 2 Squadron – Vampires, then No. 1 Squadron to fly Hunters FGA 9 aircraft, and then had a posting to No. 5 Squadron flying B2 and T4 Canberra bombers. Command appointments included Flight Commander on Hunters and Canberras, Officer Commanding Forward Air Field's FAF 2 Kariba and FAF 7 Buffalo Range, and Fire Force Charlie.

Ground staff appointments included Officer Commanding Admin Wing, Thornhill, Staff Officer Volunteer Reserve and Staff Officer Personnel at Air Force Headquarters.

== Later career ==
After retiring from the Air Force, Geldenhuys joined hardboard manufacturer Masonite as a Personnel Superintendent, retiring as a Loss Control Manager after 20 years service. He emigrated to New Zealand in 2011 and enjoys managing Peysoft Publications, specialising in the formatting manuscripts for epub publication.

== Published books ==
Title	Author	Type	Genre	Topic	Year
Rhodesian Air Force Operations with Air Strike Log	Prop Preller Geldenhuys	Non-fiction	Military	Aviation	2007
Rhodesian War Casualties and Air Force Memorials	Prop Geldenhuys	Non-fiction	Military	Roll of Honour	2009
Geldenhuys Genealogy - 12 Generations (Vol One)	Preller Geldenhuys	Non-fiction	Genealogy	Family Tree	2011
Geldenhuys Genealogy - 12 Generations (Vol Two)	Preller Geldenhuys	Non-fiction	Genealogy	Family Tree	2011
Geldenhuys Genealogy: Vol One and Two	Preller Geldenhuys	Non-fiction	Genealogy	Geldenhuys	2015
Rhodesian Air Force Operations	Preller Geldenhuys	Non-fiction	Military	Aviation	2014
Nickel Cross	"Prop" Preller Geldenhuys	Non-fiction	Autobiography	Biography	2016
Thornhill 2015 Magazine	Preller Geldenhuys	Non-fiction	Education	Schooling	2015
Hongi Hika and Hone Heke	Preller Geldenhuys	Non-fiction	History	New Zealand	2016
James Cook and Samuel Marsden	Preller Geldenhuys	Non-fiction	History	New Zealand	2016
The Dash - between Life and Death	Preller Geldenhuys	Non-fiction	Personal	Experience	2017
