= May 1971 =

Month of 1971

<<	May 1971					>>
Su	Mo	Tu	We	Th	Fr	Sa
						1
2	3	4	5	6	7	8
9	10	11	12	13	14	15
16	17	18	19	20	21	22
23	24	25	26	27	28	29
30	31

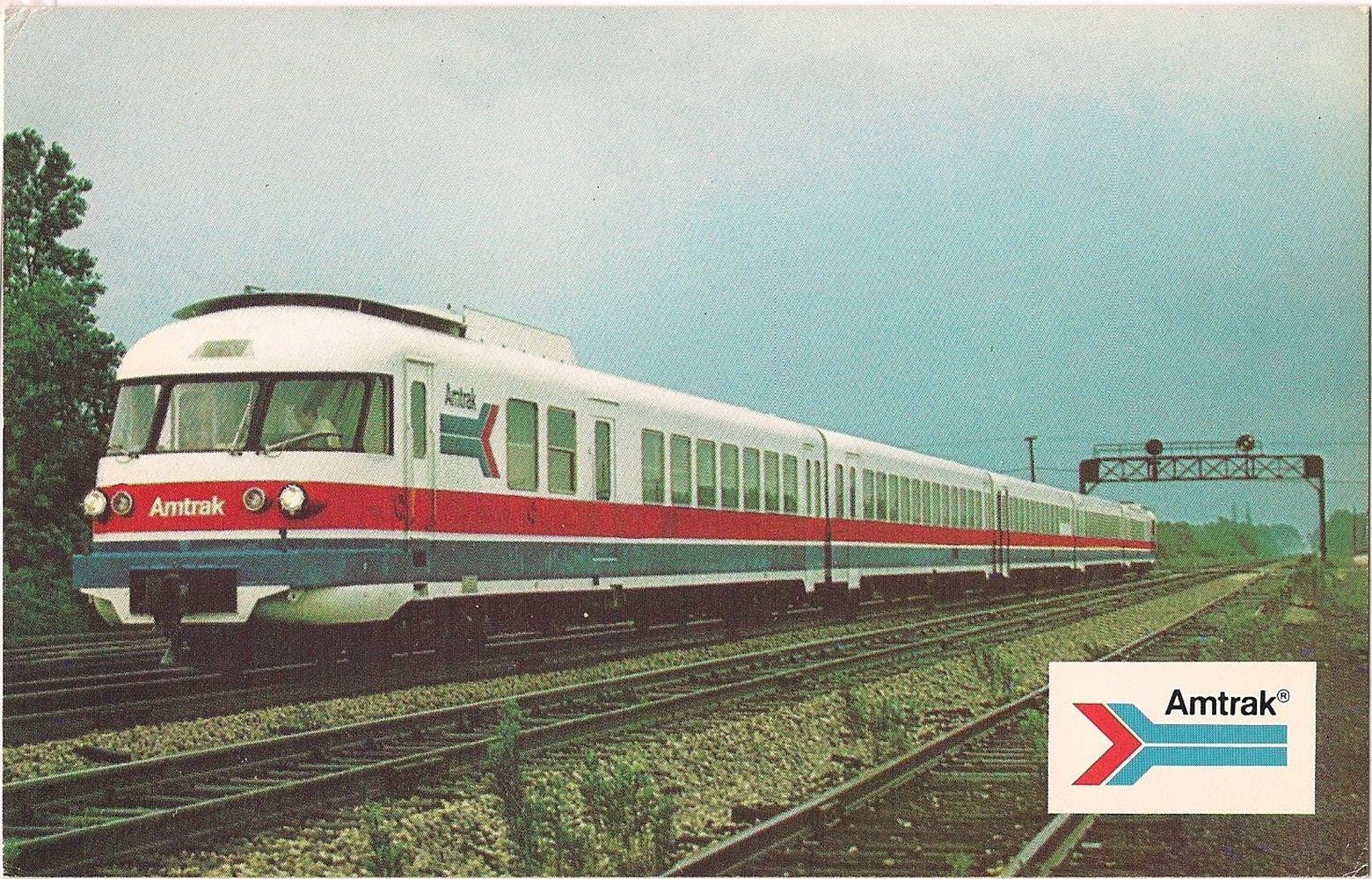
May 1, 1971: Amtrak begins operations for all U.S. passenger train service

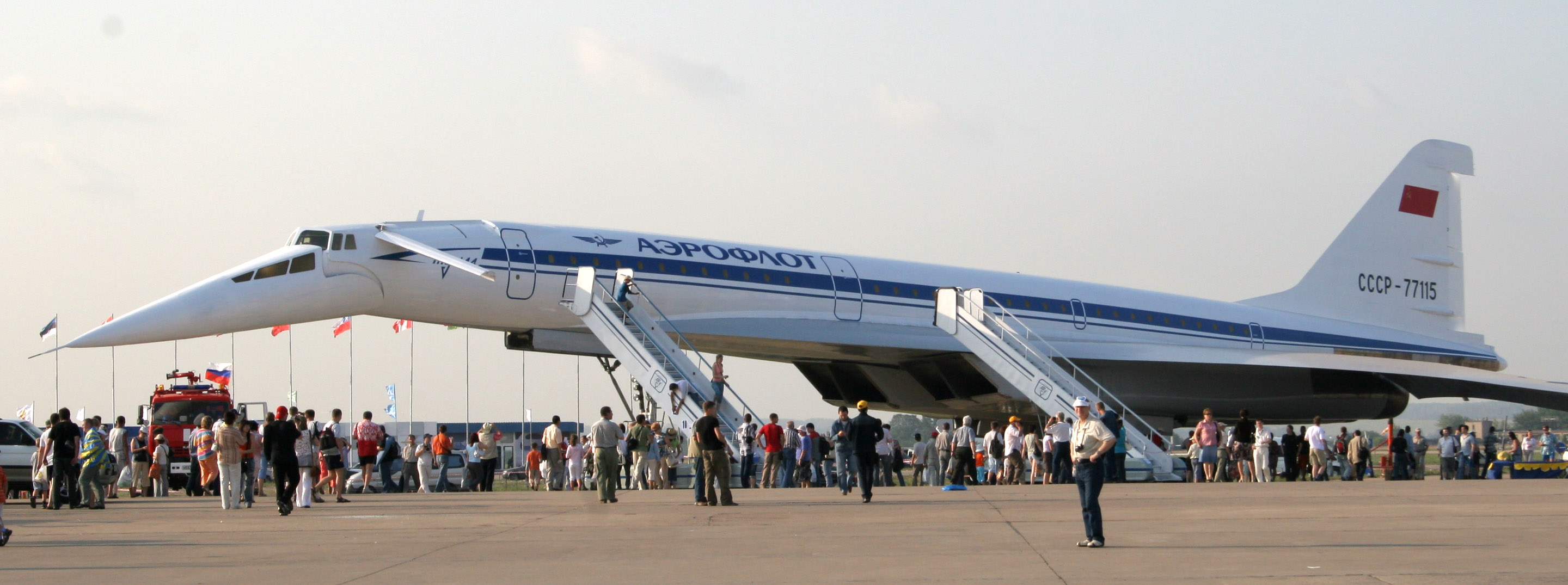
May 25, 1971: Soviet Tu-144 supersonic plane first brought to the West

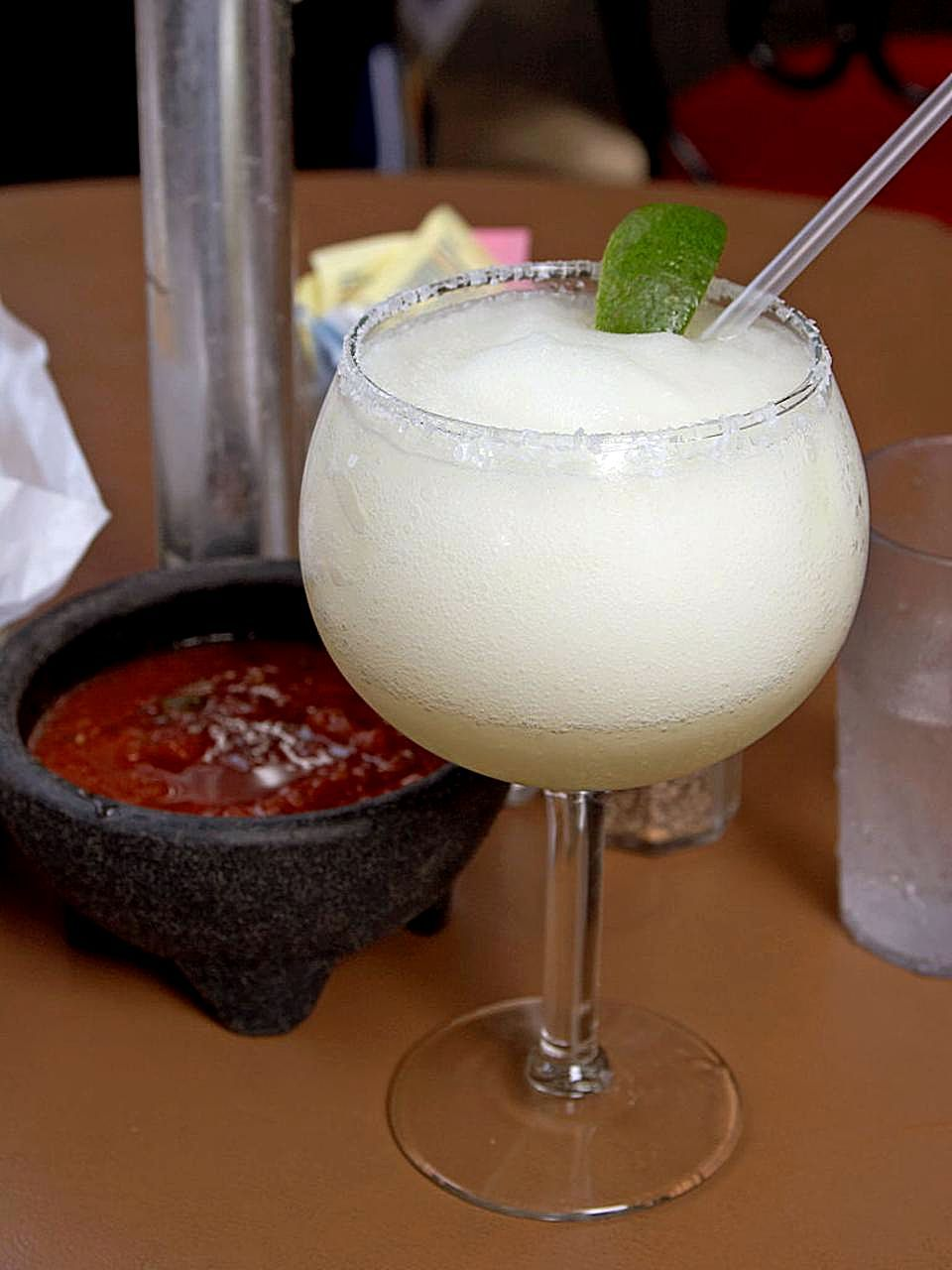
May 11, 1971: The margarita becomes the first mass-produced cocktail

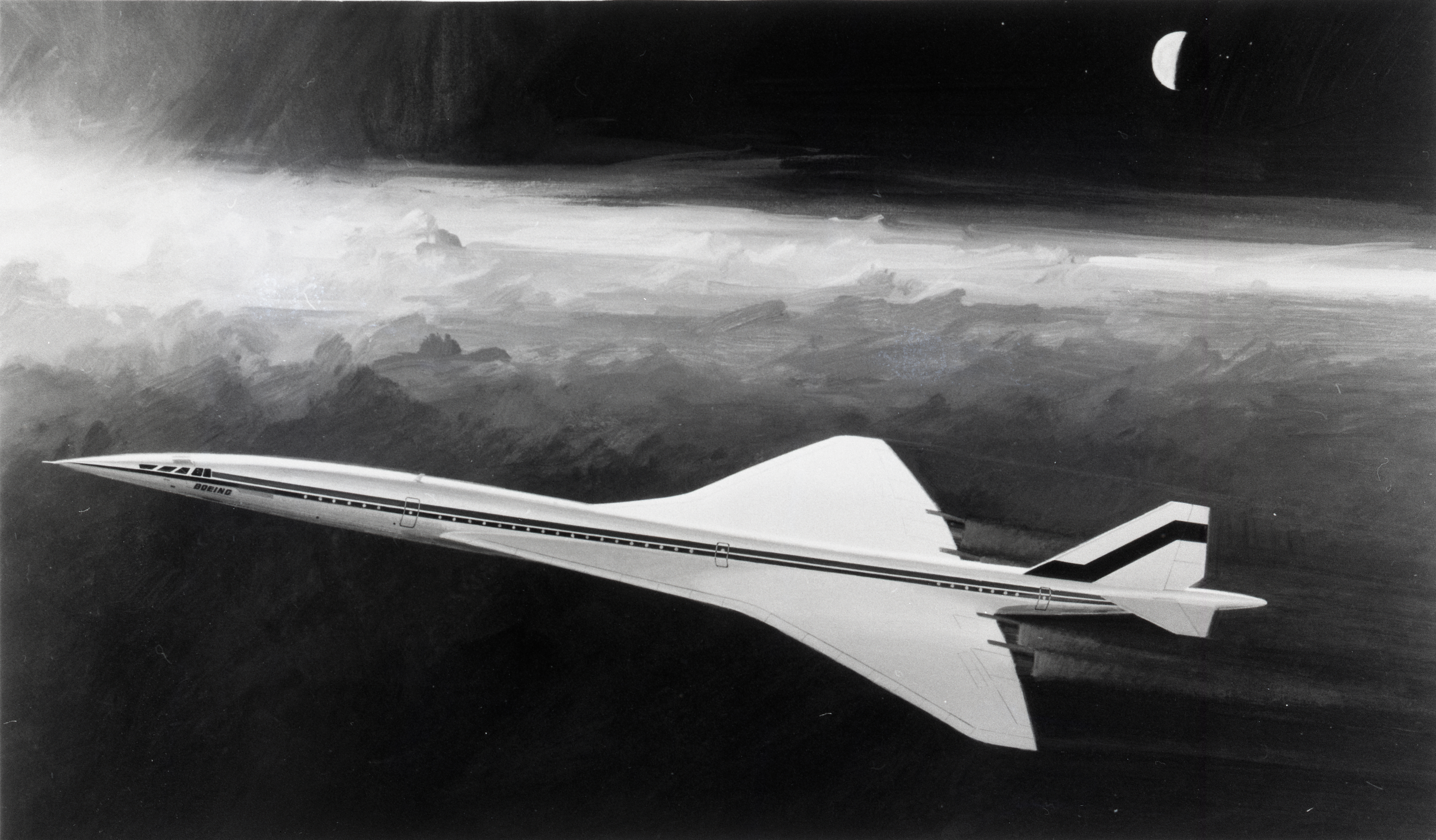
May 20, 1971: U.S. Boeing 2707 "SST" supersonic plane development cancelled

The following events occurred in May 1971:

== May 1, 1971 (Saturday) ==
- Amtrak, the U.S. National Railroad Passenger Corporation, began its inter-city rail passenger service in the United States, operating as a successor to the passenger services of private railroad companies that had operated in the U.S. for more than a century. "The semi-nationalization of the passenger rails," a reporter noted, "was ushered in without fanfare or trouble in most cities." The first official Amtrak service began at 12:05 a.m. as the Metroliner departed Penn Station in New York City on its run to Washington. When it began operating passenger service, Amtrak operated 178 passenger trains and served more than 300 U.S. cities.
- The government of Ceylon (now Sri Lanka) announced a four-day amnesty period for all guerrillas who agreed to surrender to the local authorities before May 5, promising that rebels who did participate would be taken, unharmed, to the capital at Colombo and made to participate in "re-education" classes at university. Starting May 6, Prime Minister Sirimavo Bandaranaike added, rebels who refused to surrender would be hunted down. She reported that 250 rebels had laid down their weapons.
- American hijacker Raphael Minichiello was released from a prison in Rome, 18 months after hijacking TWA Flight 85 on October 31, 1969 over California and commandeering the Boeing 707 to Italy. Minichiello, a U.S. Marine who had boarded the aircraft on the day he was scheduled to face a court-martial, had faced a minimum sentence of 20 years in a U.S. prison for air piracy. The Italian government had refused to allow his extradition, since the crime took place five months before Italy had entered into an international extradition treaty and because of its own law prohibiting extradition for any crime where the death penalty was applicable.
- The Angry Brigade set off a bomb at the Biba store in London.
- The Kentucky Derby was won by Venezuelan-trained racehorse Canonero II, with Venezuelan jockey Gustavo Ávila riding.
- Born: Ajith Kumar, Indian actor, in Secunderabad, Andhra Pradesh
- Died: Glenda Farrell, 66, U.S. actress, from lung cancer

== May 2, 1971 (Sunday) ==
- Egypt's President Anwar Sadat fired one of his two Vice Presidents, Aly Sabri, but gave no immediate explanation for the removal. Sabri, who had participated with Gamal Abdel Nasser and with Sadat in the 1952 revolution that deposed King Farouk, had been openly critical of Sadat's pursuit of a federation with Libya and Syria.
- In Ceylon, left-wing guerrillas under the command of Colonel Fernando Mahendran launched a series of assaults against public buildings while the four-day long amnesty continued.
- Police in Washington, D.C., began at dawn to disperse 30,000 anti-war protesters who had camped along the Potomac River after listening to an all-night rock concert. The move had been made in anticipation of announced plans to disrupt traffic on Monday.
- Died:
  - Olaf Barda, 61, first Norwegian International Master in chess
  - John Horne Blackmore, Canadian teacher, 81, first leader of the Social Credit Party of Canada

== May 3, 1971 (Monday) ==
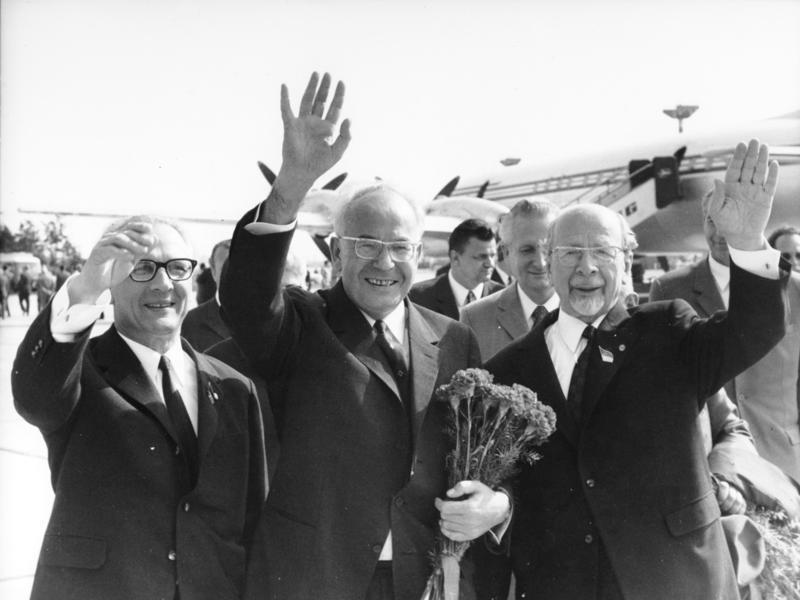
Erich Honecker (left) and Walter Ulbricht (right) greeting Czechoslovak leader Husák

- Walter Ulbricht resigned as the General Secretary of East Germany's ruling Communist Party, the Socialist Unity Party of Germany (Sozialistische Einheitspartei Deutschlands or SED), but retained the position of head of state. Speaking to the SED's Central Committee, the 77-year old Ulbricht, who had led the party since 1946, cited his age and his health as the reasons for leaving, and named Erich Honecker as his successor. He continued in office as Chairman of the State Council as the nominal head of state. After being approved by the Central Committee, Honecker made his first speech as the nation's new de facto leader and said that he would continue the hard-line policies against dissent that had been implemented by Ulbricht,
- The Harris Poll announced that a recent survey had found that 60% of Americans opposed the Vietnam War, based on the question of whether the U.S. should withdraw its troops even if it means that South Vietnam would fall to the Communists. For the first time since the question was asked, a majority of Americans (58% to 29%) agreed that it was "morally wrong" for the U.S. to be fighting in Vietnam. The poll was taken of 1,500 households between April 12 and April 15. Pollster Louis Harris wrote that "The tide of American public opinion has now turned decisively against the war in Indo-China."
- Anti-war activists attempted to disrupt government business in Washington, D.C., a day after police had begun dispersing 30,000. Police and military units arrested as many as 12,000, most of whom were later released.
- In London, the Daily Mail, first published in 1896, was relaunched as a tabloid. The new format came with the merger of the staffs of the Daily Mail and the defunct Daily Sketch.
- All Things Considered, National Public Radio's flagship news program, was broadcast for the first time, starting at 5:00 p.m. Eastern time on 90 NPR stations. Robert Conley served as the first host of the 90-minute program.
- General Lon Nol agreed to continue as the nominal Premier of the Khmer Republic (formerly Cambodia) after having announced his resignation for reasons of health on April 20. After an unsuccessful 13-day search during which nobody was willing to serve as Prime Minister, General Lon agreed to continue in office, although he delegated most executive power to Lieutenant General Sisowath Sirik Matak.
- Born: Douglas Carswell, British politician who, in 2014, became the first candidate of the UK Independence Party to be elected to the House of Commons
- Died: Joel Lieber, 35, American novelist, was killed after jumping from the window of his apartment in New York City.

== May 4, 1971 (Tuesday) ==
- Thirty-one people were killed in Canada, when their homes in the village of Saint-Jean-Vianney, Quebec were swallowed by a sinkhole and then buried by mud and debris. After a heavy rainstorm, the ground beneath 35 houses gave way. Most of the victims were employees of the Aluminum Company of Canada and their families.
- John Froines, sought by the FBI as the leader of the "Mayday Tribe" and accused of conspiracy to interfere with the civil rights of commuters and federal employees as part of a protest, was arrested 15 minutes after an agent had spotted him. To the surprise of FBI agents, Mr. Froines had been recognized while he was addressing a crowd of thousands of anti-war demonstrators and standing directly beneath the office window of U.S. Attorney General John N. Mitchell.
- Four home-made bombs were found in the vicinity of Chislehurst and Sidcup Grammar School in the UK. The authorities at first thought these belonged to the Angry Brigade but concluded that the explosives were more likely to be the work of students who had devised improvised bombs as an experiment on a school trip to Norway in 1970.

== May 5, 1971 (Wednesday) ==
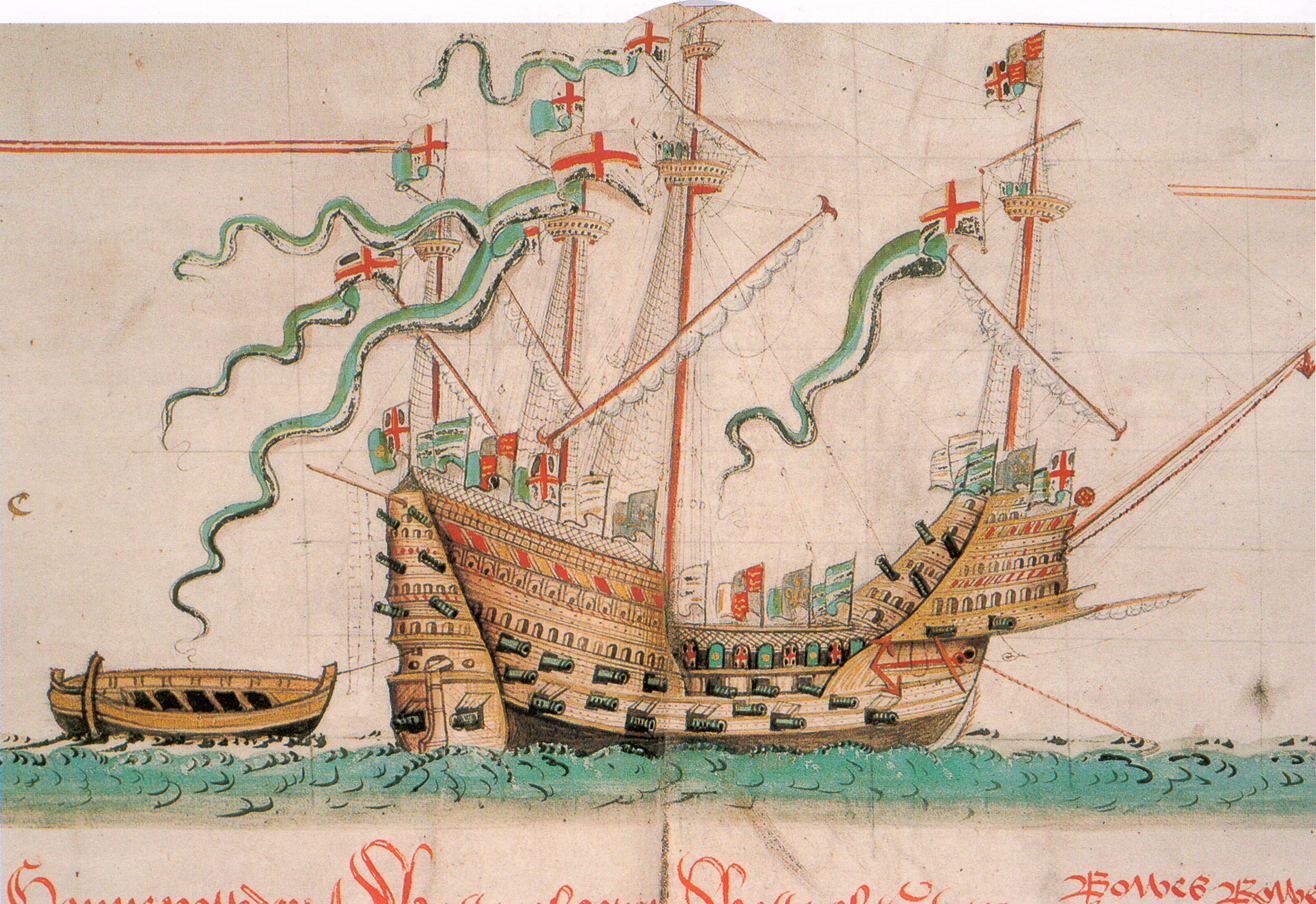
The Mary Rose

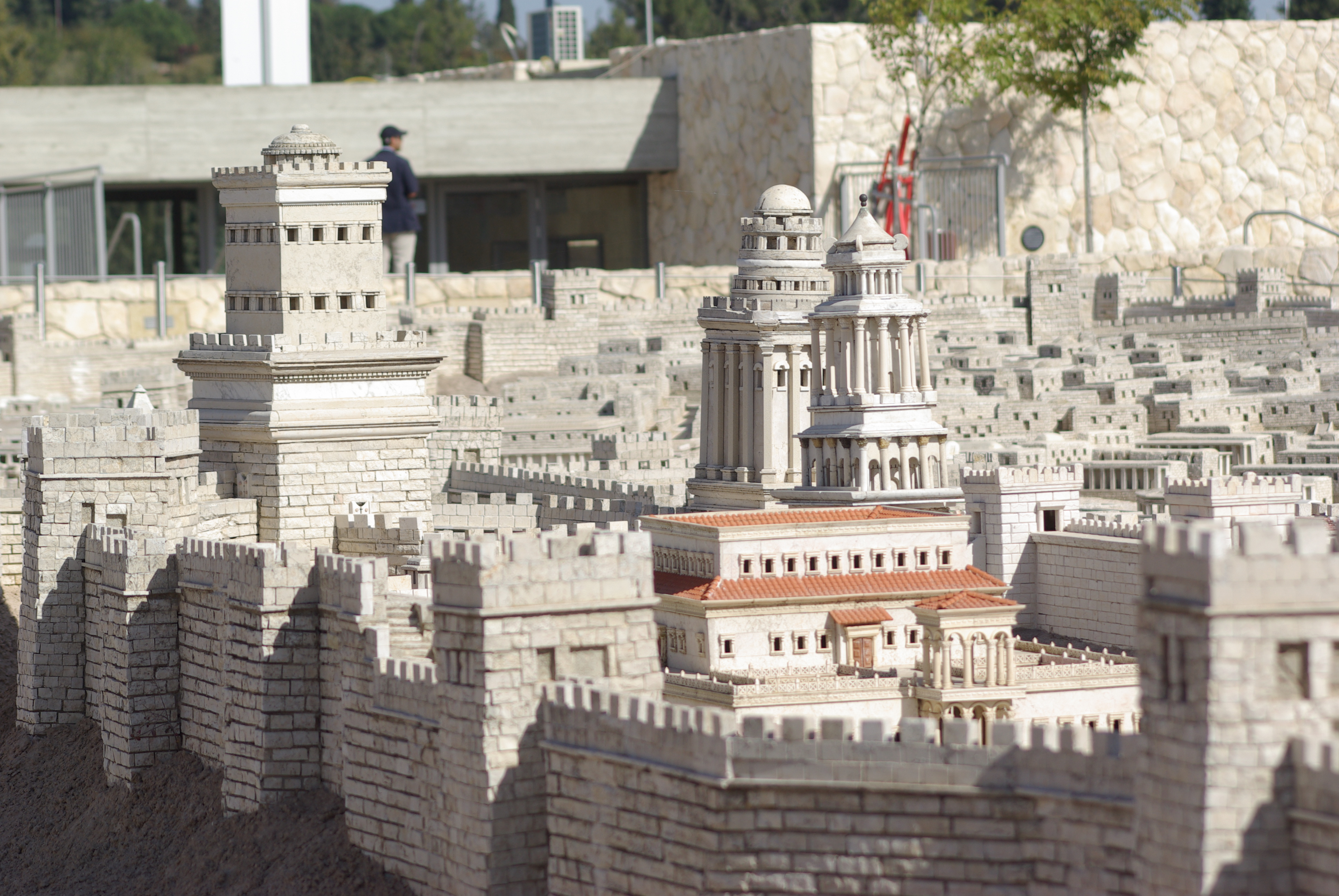
A model of Herod's Palace

- After the U.S. dollar continued to flood the European currency markets and to threaten West Germany's Deutsche Mark, the central banks of Austria, Belgium, Netherlands and Switzerland stopped further trading of the dollar.
- The English warship Mary Rose, which had sunk with 385 sailors on July 19, 1545, in the Battle of the Solent, was rediscovered after more than 425 years. A timber from the ship had become exposed in the bottom of The Solent, the strait separating the Isle of Wight from the English mainland.
- Israeli archaeologist Dan Bahat announced in Jerusalem that his team had discovered the remains of Herod's Palace, built during the reign of King Herod the Great, ruler of the client state of Judea within the Roman Empire during the late 1st century BC.
- The District of Columbia police arrested and jailed about 1,200 anti-war activists who had entered the U.S. Capitol to listen to a speech by Congressman Ronald Dellums and placed them inside a makeshift jail that had been set up at RFK Stadium. On January 16, 1975, a U.S. District Court jury would award twelve million dollars in damages to the group for false imprisonment after an illegal arrest.
- Died:
  - Violet Jessop, 83, English former nurse who survived the sinkings of the sister ships RMS Titanic and HMHS Britannic in 1912 and 1916, respectively
  - Sir W. D. Ross, 94, Scottish philosopher

== May 6, 1971 (Thursday) ==
- The day after the expiration of the four day amnesty period for anti-government guerrillas in Sri Lanka (called Ceylon at the time), the Ceylonese Army began a major offensive against the People's Liberation Front.
- The U.S. Food and Drug Administration warned American consumers against eating swordfish after finding that more than 95% of 853 samples of the food tested were contaminated with excessive levels of mercury.
- The state of North Carolina ratified the Nineteenth Amendment to the United States Constitution, granting women the right to vote, more than 50 years after it had taken effect in 1920. The new vote on the amendment was approved unanimously by the North Carolina State Senate. Lieutenant Governor Pat Taylor, in his capacity as president of the senate, called for the vote by saying "All those who favor women, signify by saying 'aye'." At the time, the only state not to have ratified the Nineteenth Amendment was Mississippi, which would finally approve it in 1984.
- All ten passengers and two crewmembers aboard Apache Airlines Flight 33 were killed when the right wing of the De Havilland 104 Dove airplane fell off during the plane's flight from Tucson to Phoenix. The plane crashed onto farmland 5 miles (8.0 km) southwest of Coolidge, Arizona.
- Died: Dickie Valentine (stage name for Richard Bryce), 41, English singer, was killed in a car crash at Glangrwyney in Wales near Crickhowell

== May 7, 1971 (Friday) ==
- The 3rd U.S. Marine Expeditionary Brigade ceased all ground and air operations in Vietnam and prepared for its deactivation.
- Owners of the teams in the National Basketball Association (NBA) and the rival American Basketball Association (ABA) reached an agreement in New York City to merge the two leagues into a 28-team circuit of 17 NBA teams and 11 ABA teams. Players in both leagues stated at the same time that they opposed the merger because it would move competitive bidding for their services. Although a championship game between the two leagues was not discussed, the parties agreed to play inter-league preseason games during the fall.
- Serial killer Carroll Cole committed the first of 15 strangulation murders of women over a period of more than nine years, starting with Essie Buck, whom he picked up at a bar in San Diego. Arrested in 1980, Cole would be executed by lethal injection in Nevada on December 6, 1985.
- Died: Ranada Prasad Shaha, 74, Pakistani Bengali philanthropist and businessman, was taken from his home by the Pakistani Army, along with his 3-year old grandson. Their bodies have never been found. Forty-eight years later, Mahbubur Rahman, would be convicted of participating in Shaha's murder.

== May 8, 1971 (Saturday) ==
- Mariner 8 was launched by the United States from Cape Kennedy on a mission to Mars at 8:11 p.m. local time (0111 UTC 9 May), but a malfunction of the Centaur rocket's upper stage caused the launch vehicle to tumble out of control slightly less than five minutes later, before it could reach orbit.
- A 24-hour truce began between the combatants in the Vietnam War at noon to allow the festival celebrations in both North Vietnam and South Vietnam of the birthday of Gautama Buddha.
- Arsenal won the FA Cup final in extra time, 2 to 1 over Liverpool at Wembley Stadium, with Charlie George scoring the winning goal in the 21st minute of play after the game was drawn 1 to 1 at the end of 90 minutes. It was only the second time in the 20th century that an English team had completed the double (finishing in first place in the Football League First Division and winning the FA Cup). On May 3, Arsenal had finished the season with 29 wins, seven draws and six losses.
- In Long Beach, California, the former British ocean liner RMS Queen Mary, which took passengers on cruises in 1967 began its first day as a tourist attraction, initially limited to taking customers on walking tours of the ship.

== May 9, 1971 (Sunday) ==
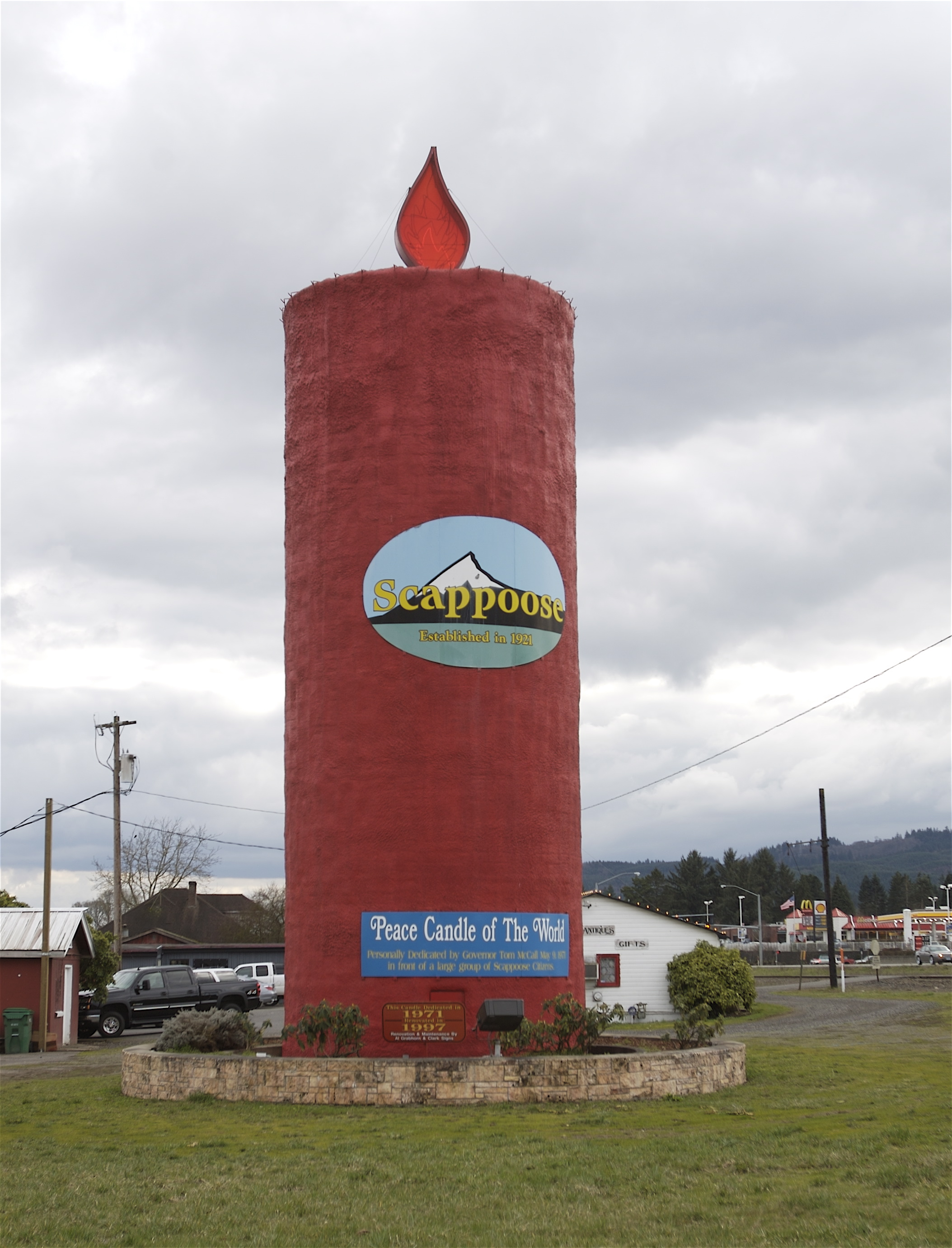
Peace Candle

- The very first Women's FA Cup in England, the Mitre Challenge Trophy for women's professional soccer football, was won when Southampton Women's F.C. defeated Stewarton Thistle, 4 to 1, in the final held at Crystal Palace National Sports Centre. Pat Davies scored three of her team's four goals and Dot Cassell contributed the lone Stewarton score.
- The Emmy Awards were held in Los Angeles. All in the Family won the award for Outstanding Comedy Series, The Flip Wilson Show was the Outstanding Variety show, and The Bold Ones: The Senator won as the best drama. Best acting awards went to comedians Jack Klugman and Jean Stapleton, and to Hal Holbrook and Susan Hampshire. The award for most outstanding single performance by an actor went to George C. Scott, who had rejected his Academy Award for Patton, but announced that he was pleased to accept the Emmy Award.
- The "Peace Candle of the World" was first lit, in a ceremony at Scappoose, Oregon before Oregon Governor Tom McCall and the town's mayor. The 50 ft (15 m) tall candle, still a roadside attraction, was ignited by a special 60 ft (18 m) long match. The candle, "a hollow silo coated with 4,500 pounds of wax" was designed by Scappoose resident Darrell Brock.

== May 10, 1971 (Monday) ==
- Kosmos 419, the Soviet Union's probe intended to explore Mars, reached Earth orbit but the incorrect setting of a timer on an engine kept it from leaving the parking orbit. Kosmos 419 fell out of orbit two days later. A subsequent investigation showed that a ground control operator had incorrectly entered the 8-digit code that would have ignited the Blok D upper stage. The failure came two days after the unsuccessful launch of the American Mariner 8 probe to Mars.
- Fifty-nine of the 70 people aboard a bus operating near Gapyeong in South Korea were killed when the vehicle ran off of a 30 feet (9.1 m) cliff and fell into the Chongpyong Reservoir. According to police, the driver was speeding and, at 8:55 in the morning, struck a large rock, causing him to lose control and end up at the bottom of the 60 feet (18 m) deep lake.
- Born: Doris Neuner, Austrian luger and former Olympic champion

== May 11, 1971 (Tuesday) ==
- Dallas restaurant operator Mariano Martinez invented the process that would make the frozen margarita "America's most popular cocktail". Adapting a soft-serve ice cream machine to hold gallons of pre-made frozen margarita mix, Martinez was able to serve margaritas that evening as soon as they were ordered, eliminating the process where each individual drink had to be made in a blender.
- The Daily Sketch, Britain's oldest tabloid newspaper, ceased publication after 62 years.
- Gamma, the Netherlands-based chain of hardware stores, opened its first store, based in the city of Breda.
- Born: Yang Yuying, Chinese pop music singer and actress; in Nanchang, Jiangxi province
- Died: Seán Lemass, 72, former Taoiseach of Ireland

== May 12, 1971 (Wednesday) ==
- An earthquake in southwestern Turkey killed 58 people and destroyed or damaged 70 percent of the city of Burdur and villages in the Burdur Province.
- The U.S. House of Representatives voted, 201 to 197, to revive funding of the U.S. supersonic transport (SST) research program, budgeting $85.3 million toward the project.
- British musician Mick Jagger of the Rolling Stones married Bianca Perez Morena de Macías of Nicaragua in Saint-Tropez, France, in a Roman Catholic ceremony. Paul McCartney, Ringo Starr, and their wives were among the wedding guests.
- Died: Tor Johnson (ring name for Karl Erik Tore Johansson), 67, Swedish-born American professional wrestler and character actor, known for playing the title role in the 1961 cult film The Beast of Yucca Flats

== May 13, 1971 (Thursday) ==
- More than 800 civilians were murdered in an attack by the Pakistani Army and vigilante groups on the Bangladesh village of Baushgari in the Demra district. Matiur Rahman Nizami would be executed on May 11, 2016 for planning the massacre.
- The government of the Soviet Union decreed a change of boundaries between its constituent republics, announcing that part of the northeast Uzbek SSR's Sirdaryo Region had been transferred to the south central Kazakh SSR to become part of that republic's Chimkent Oblast. Although Article 14 of the Soviet Constitution required that transfers of territory between any of its 15 republics would require the legislatures of both areas affected, no prior notice was given of the boundary revision, which came in the form of a decree published on the front page of Kazakhstanskaya Pravda, the Russian language daily newspaper of Kazakhstan.
- Argentina's government health agency PAMI (Programa de Atención Médica Integral) was created by order of President Alejandro Agustin Lanusse.
- Karl Schiller replaced Alex Möller as Minister of Finance in West Germany, after being called in by Chancellor Willy Brandt to respond to a worldwide economic crisis and the erosion of the value of the West German deutschmark.
- Born: Espen Lind, Norwegian songwriter, producer, singer, and multi-instrumentalist, in Tromsø
- Died: Virginia O'Hanlon, 81, retired American schoolteacher who became famous in 1897 for her letter to the New York Sun that was responded to in the famous essay by editor Francis Pharcellus Church, "Yes, Virginia, There is a Santa Claus"

== May 14, 1971 (Friday) ==
- Egypt's President Anwar Sadat addressed the nation on television and on radio and announced that he had fired seven members of his cabinet (including his War Minister, Mohammed Fawzi, and his Interior Minister and deputy premier, Sharaway Gomaa), along with three members of the eight-man leadership of Egypt's lone political party, the Arab Socialist Union (ASU). Confirming that General Fawzi had been placed under house arrest, Sadat then went on to charge that his political opponents had planned a coup d'etat against him, in addition to wiretapping his office and attempting to disrupt the carrying out of his orders, and that new elections would be held for the ASU "from the base to the top". Sadat's "Corrective Movement" (harakat al-tasbbib), began the next day.
- Thirty-seven soldiers of the Armed Forces of Honduras presidential honor guard died suddenly after being served poorly prepared fruits that had been sprayed with Parathion, a highly toxic insecticide. The lives of others were saved by physicians and medical technicians who were rushed in with a parathion antidote from a U.S. Army hospital in Panama.
- At Goteborg in Sweden, a fiery explosion onboard the Norwegian freighter MV Stavanger killed 11 workers and injured 33. The blast was believed to have been caused by a leak of acetylene gas in a welder's torch.
- Pope Paul VI issued the Apostolic Letter Octogesima adveniens (Latin for "Eightieth Anniversary") to Cardinal Maurice Roy, President of the Pontifical Council for the Laity and of the Pontifical Council for Justice and Peace, on the occasion of the eightieth anniversary of Pope Leo XIII's encyclical Rerum Novarum.
- Born:
  - Sofia Coppola, American film director and screenwriter, Academy Award winner for Lost in Translation; in New York City
  - Princess Sumaya bint El Hassan of Jordan, Jordanian education advocate and founder of the Princess Sumaya University for Technology; in Amman
  - Freaky Tah (stage name for Raymond Rogers), American rapper and member of hip hop group The Lost Boyz; in Queens, New York (murdered 1999)
- Died: Heinz Richter, 61, German radio engineer and author

== May 15, 1971 (Saturday) ==
- Thirteen people were killed in an accident while attending a wedding reception in the French village of Sallen in Normandy, when the floor of the hall collapsed and guests fell into the cellar below, where they either drowned in an unused well, or were asphyxiated as other people landed on top of them. The mayor of Sallen, who had given permission for the hall to be used, committed suicide on May 31.
- Two weeks after winning the Kentucky Derby, Venezuelan racehorse Canonero II won the Preakness Stakes, setting a record of completing the one and 3/16ths mile race in 1 minute, 54 seconds, and raising the possibility that a horse would win the U.S. triple crown for the first time in more than 20 years.
- Died: Sir Tyrone Guthrie, 70, Anglo-Irish theatrical director

== May 16, 1971 (Sunday) ==
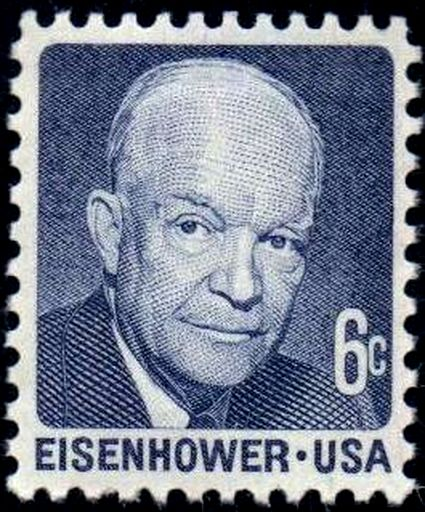
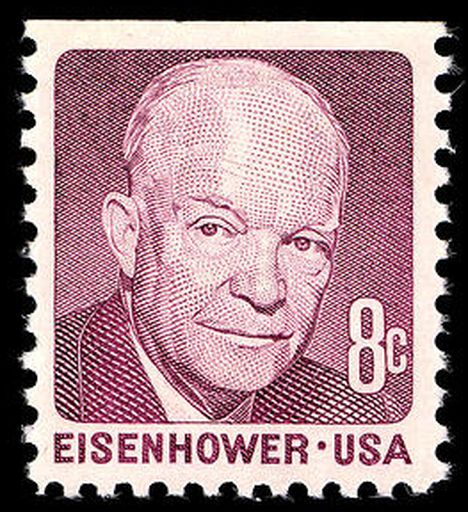
Up more than 33%
- The price of mailing a letter in the United States increased by one-third, with a price rise from 6 cents to 8 cents. The new 8¢ stamp had a portrait of the later U.S. president Dwight D. Eisenhower similar to that of the 6¢ stamp issued in 1970.
- Born: Simon Katz, English songwriter and multi-instrumentalist
- Died: Sir Collier Cudmore, 85, Australian lawyer, politician and Olympic champion rower

== May 17, 1971 (Monday) ==
- Virtually all railroads in the United States shut down starting at 6:01 a.m. Eastern time as the Brotherhood of Railroad Signalmen walked out on strike, preventing the safe operation of trains, and other railway workers refused to cross the Brotherhood's picket lines. The shutdown then "rippled westward across the nation's time zones" over the next three hours as 6:01 arrived in the Central, Mountain and Pacific zones of the U.S. In emergency session, Congress passed a bill to provide a pay raise of 13.5% to the railworkers to last until October 1 as part of a "cooling off" period, and U.S. President Nixon signed the bill into law at 11:30 the next evening. The railroads reopened the next day.
- Efraim Elrom, Israel's Consul General to Turkey, was kidnapped in Istanbul by the terrorist Türkiye Halk Kurtuluş Partisi-Cephesi (THKP-C), which set a deadline of 5:00 Friday for Turkey to release imprisoned THKP-C members. Elrom, who had been the interrogator who questioned Adolf Eichmann in 1961, was walking to his apartment at lunchtime when he was seized. He was executed on May 22 and his body was found two days later.
- An early avanproyekt of the Ilyushin Il-86 was displayed at an exhibition of civil aviation novelties at Vnukovo Airport near Moscow.
- The book musical Godspell, written by John-Michael Tebelak, with music by Stephen Schwartz, premiered as an off-Broadway production at Cherry Lane Theater in New York.
- Born:
  - Queen Máxima of the Netherlands, Argentine-born wife of King Willem-Alexander and, starting in 2013, the first queen consort of the Netherlands since 1890; as Máxima Zorreguieta, in Buenos Aires
  - Gina Raimondo, Governor of Rhode Island 2015 to 2021; in Smithfield, Rhode Island

== May 18, 1971 (Tuesday) ==
- In the seventh and deciding game of the best-of-7 Stanley Cup Final, the Montreal Canadiens defeated the Chicago Black Hawks, 3 to 2. After Chicago had taken a 2 to 0 lead in the second period on scores by Dennis Hull and Danny O'Shea, Jacques Lemaire made the first Montreal score. Henri Richard tied the game and then scored the winning goal early in the final period. Canadiens rookie Ken Dryden, who had never played in the NHL until March, stopped 31 of 33 shots on goal in preserving the win.
- In Salt Lake City, the Utah Stars won the championship of the American Basketball Association (ABA) in the seventh game of the best-of-7 series, 131 to 121 over the Kentucky Colonels of Louisville. Zelmo Beaty had 36 points for the winners, while the Colonels' Dan Issel had 41.
- U.S. truck manufacturer Mack Trucks, Inc. and the government of the Soviet Union entered into a contract for Mack to design and supply equipment for the Russians to use for the KAMAZ truck factory, under construction in the Russian SFSR at Naberezhnye Chelny on the Kama River. The agreement, which would double the volume of U.S. exports to the U.S.S.R., was kept secret until June 17 at the request of the Nixon administration.

== May 19, 1971 (Wednesday) ==
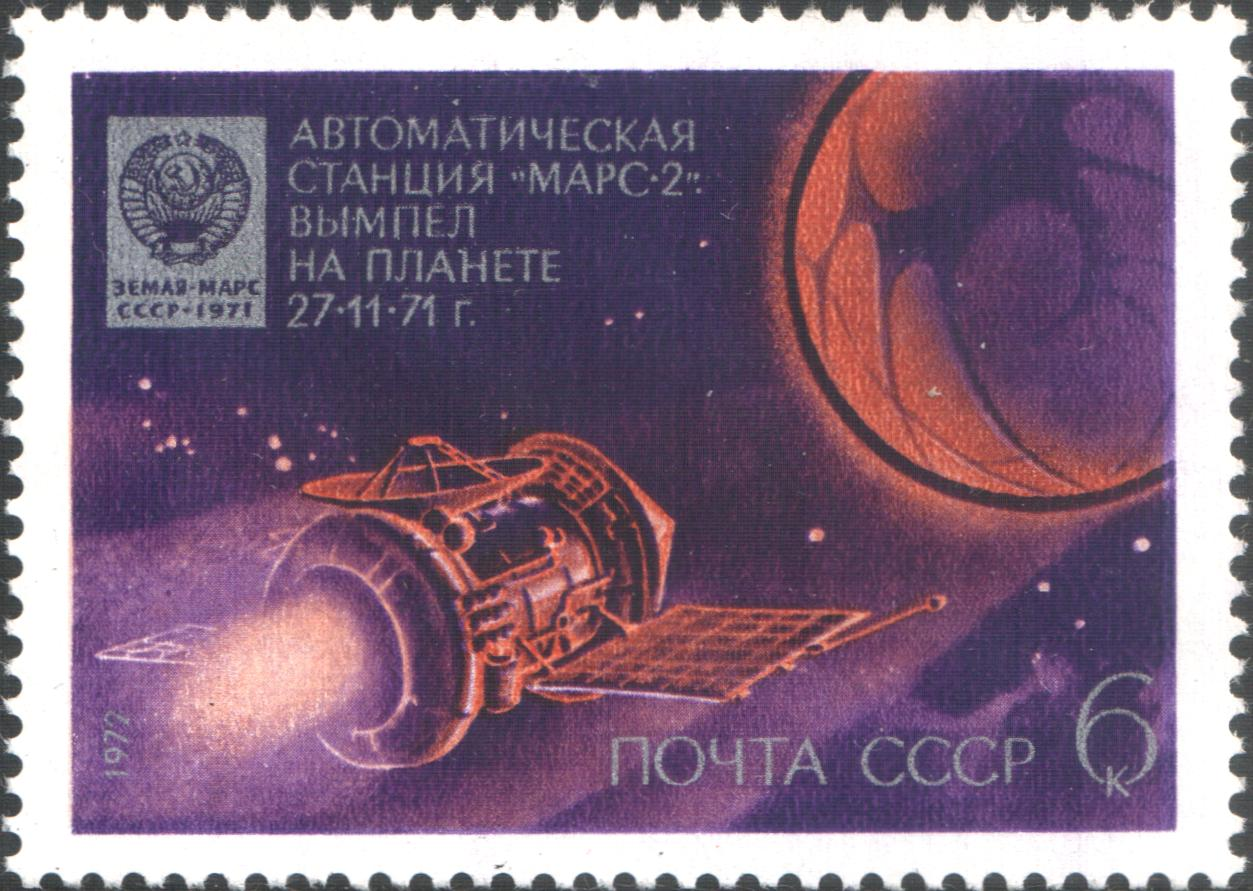
The Soviet Mars 2 stamp

- Mars 2 was launched by the Soviet Union on the first interplanetary mission to land a spacecraft on Mars. The probe reached Mars on November 27, but the descent module entered the Martian atmosphere at a steeper angle than planned and crashed on the surface.
- By an overwhelming margin, the U.S. Senate voted 58 to 37 against a proposal, approved earlier by the House of Representatives, that would have revived funding of the American supersonic transport (SST) program for Boeing's design of a high-speed aircraft.
- Canada and the Soviet Union signed an amity agreement on the first full day of Prime Minister Pierre Trudeau's visit to Moscow. The pact, drafted secretly, was signed by Trudeau and Soviet Premier Aleksei Kosygin and called for regular high level meetings in the interests of "friendship, good-neighborliness and mutual confidence".
- Died: Ogden Nash, 68, American poet and humorist

== May 20, 1971 (Thursday) ==
- More than 8,000 refugees were killed in the worst massacre of the Bangladesh Liberation War when the Army of Pakistan and the Razakars paramilitary group attacked the town of Chuknagar in the Dumuria district in what is now the Khulna province of Bangladesh.
- The trial of the "Leningrad 9", nine Soviet Jews who had been accused of "organized anti-Soviet activity" for sending "information containing vicious slander about the position of Jews in the Soviet Union", ended in Leningrad (now Saint Petersburg) with all nine being found guilty. The defendants were given sentences ranging from one year to 10 years imprisonment, with engineer Gliya I. Butman receiving ten years and Dr. Mikhail L. Korenblit seven for playing leading roles in plotting a hijacking that never took place.
- Boeing announced the cancellation of the SST project, officially the Boeing 2707.
- An opera based on the book Adventures of Huckleberry Finn was premiered by the Juilliard Opera Company. The lone opera of composer Hall Overton (in partnership with co-librettist Judah Stampfer) marked the operatic debut of bass baritone Willard White who sang the role of Jim. David Hall performed the title role.
- Born: Katarina Majerhold, Slovenian philosopher; in Celje, SR Slovenia, Yugoslavia

== May 21, 1971 (Friday) ==
- More than 2,000 Hindu refugees were killed in the Bangladesh village of Dakra in the Rampal Upazila district. The killings were carried out by more than 20 members of the Razakars on orders from Muslim cleric AKM Yusuf.
- Born: Aditya Chopra, Indian film director, son of Yash Chopra
- Died:
  - Dennis King, 73, English singer and actor
  - Johannes Letzmann, 85, Estonian meteorologist and tornado researcher

== May 22, 1971 (Saturday) ==
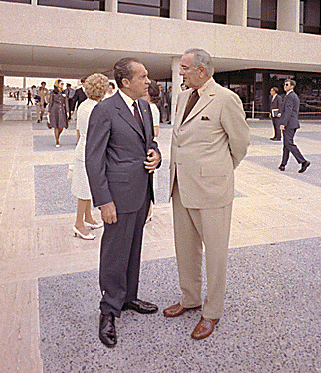
Nixon and LBJ at the library

- A 6.8 magnitude earthquake, lasting 20 seconds, destroyed most of the city of Bingöl in Turkey. The quake hit at 6:45 in the evening local time. More than 1,000 people were killed, and 10,000 were made homeless.
- The Lyndon Baines Johnson Library and Museum, more commonly known as the "LBJ Presidential Library" was dedicated in Austin, Texas on the campus of the University of Texas, with U.S. President Nixon and former U.S. President Johnson attending.
- Died: Efraim Elrom, 58, Israeli consul-general to Turkey, was executed by the Turkish Liberation Army, an underground militant organization linked to the Palestine Liberation Organization, five days after he was kidnapped.

== May 23, 1971 (Sunday) ==
- Seventy-eight of the 83 people aboard Aviogenex Flight 130 were killed as the Tupolev Tu-134A jet crashed while approaching a landing at Rijeka in Yugoslavia during a heavy rain, then burst into flames. The dead included all 73 British vacationers who had chartered the plane through Yugotours Ltd., and who had boarded the aircraft at Gatwick airport in London. Only one of the 76 passengers survived.
- Limerick GAA defeated Tipperary by a single point to win the championship of the National Hurling League in Ireland. Both sides had three goals, and the final score was 3-12 to 3-11 (equivalent to 21 to 20).
- Jackie Stewart won the 1971 Monaco Grand Prix.

== May 24, 1971 (Monday) ==
- Hurricane Agatha made landfall as a Category 2 hurricane on the Saffir-Simpson hurricane scale within 45 miles (75 km) of Zihuatanejo, Mexico. The village of Playa Azul was hard-hit by the storm. Up to half of the village's homes were destroyed, along with much of the banana, mango and coconut crop.
- Voter turnout was only 33% in elections held for the parliament of Trinidad and Tobago, after the two major opposition parties (the Democratic Labour Party and the African National Congress) called for a boycott because of fraud related to voting machines. The People's National Movement, led by Prime Minister Eric Williams, won all 36 seats.
- Died:
  - Zakir Husain, 72, former Governor of East Pakistan, of injuries received during the April 9 attack on his home by the Pakistan Army.
  - Thomas J. Dodd, 64, controversial U.S. Senator for Connecticut, died four months after the expiration of his term.

== May 25, 1971 (Tuesday) ==
- Voting was held in South Korea for the 204 seats of the unicameral parliament, the Daehanminguk Gukhoe. The opposition New Democratic Party, led by Kim Hong-il won 89 seats, 29 of which had been newly created, eroding the ruling Democratic Republican Party majority from 129-45 to 113-89.
- The Tupolev Tu-144, the Soviet Union's supersonic jet passenger airliner that resembled the British-French Concorde, made its first landing in the West, arriving at Le Bourget Airport near Paris for the Paris Air Show.
- Joetha Collier, 18, an African-American woman who had graduated from high school hours earlier, was killed at random in a drive-by shooting in Drew, Mississippi, attracting extensive attention from the media and civil rights activists. A 26-year-old white man was found guilty of firing the shot, convicted of manslaughter, and given the maximum sentence of 20 years imprisonment.
- Died: Michael Willetts, 27, English soldier, was killed by a bomb while shielding potential victims; he was one of the first to be killed during The Troubles in Northern Ireland, and the posthumous recipient of the George Cross.

== May 26, 1971 (Wednesday) ==
- Qantas, the Australian airline, agreed to pay AUS$500,000 (Australian dollars, equivalent to $560,000 U.S.) to a bomb hoaxer-extortionist, Peter Macari, who identified himself only as "Mr. Brown" and who had announced that he had hidden an explosive on Qantas Flight 755. The Boeing 707 had departed Sydney at 11:30 a.m. to Hong Kong, and had 116 passengers and 12 crew aboard. The threat was not entirely unfounded, in that Macari had built a working prototype of a gelignite bomb and directed police to an airport locker at the Sydney International Airport. Connected to an altimeter, the bomb was designed to activate once the aircraft reached a designated altitude and to detonate when the jet descended to 5,000 feet (1,500 m). After defusing the bomb in the locker and replacing the connection to an indicator light, police then tested the prototype on a flight and found that the light activated at 5,000 feet. After Macari received the payoff, he called again and told police "There is no bomb aboard the plane. You can land her safely." Macari would be arrested on August 4, along with an accomplice.
- American serial killer Juan Corona, who had stabbed 25 victims to death in less than three months since February 26, was arrested at his home in Yuba City, California after police found the bodies of 12 migrant workers buried in individual graves.
- Police in mainland Italy exiled 18 reputed leaders of the Italian Mafia to the tiny island of Filicudi, with 270 residents at the time, located 35 miles (56 km) north of the island of Sicily and 13 miles (21 km) from the closest land, the island of Santa Maria Salina. About one-quarter of the residents moved away within days after the accused criminals arrived. By May 31, the remaining residents left in protest, with the exception of the exiles and the police guarding them. The previous week, 17 Mafiosi had been exiled to the small island of Linosa, located between Sicily and the African nation of Tunisia. On June 6, after public criticism of the fate of Filicudi Island, the Italian government agreed to move the Mafiosi elsewhere.
- Born: Matt Stone, American TV producer and co-creator of South Park
- Died: Laurence Wild, 81, former Governor of American Samoa

== May 27, 1971 (Thursday) ==
- The collision of two trains killed 46 people, mostly schoolchildren, near Dahlerau in West Germany. All but five of the victims were pupils of the Geschwister-Scholl-Schule in Radevormwald who were 15 or 16 years old. The two-car passenger train was traveling south and returning the students home after a school field trip to Bremen, when a north-bound freight train was given a green light at Dahlerau to pass through rather than to pull into a siding to let the passenger train pass by.
- Egypt's President Anwar el-Sadat and the Soviet Union's head of state, President of the Presidium Nikolai V. Podgorny, signed a 15-year "treaty of friendship and cooperation".
- Christie's auctioned a diamond known as Deepdene. The diamond was later found to have been artificially colored.
- Born:
  - Paul Bettany, English actor, in Shepherd's Bush, London
  - Lisa "Left Eye" Lopes, American singer and entertainer, in Philadelphia (d. 2002)
- Died: Chips Rafferty, 62, Australian actor, collapsed and died from a heart attack while walking along a street in Sydney, shortly after being offered a role in The Day the Clown Cried.

== May 28, 1971 (Friday) ==
- Portugal resigned from UNESCO.
- A Berlin-based CV-990A operated by Modern Air Transport, with 45 passengers on board, was unexpectedly denied permission to enter Bulgarian airspace, as a result of a new policy adopted by that country's then communist government to deny any aircraft whose flight had originated or was going to terminate at a West Berlin airport the right to take off and land at any of its airports. The plane landed safely back at Berlin's Tegel Airport.
- In the first meeting between players of the National Basketball Association and the rival American Basketball Association, the NBA All-Stars defeated the ABA All-Stars, 125 to 120, at the Houston Astrodome in front of a crowd of 13,363. The high scorers were Walt Frazier of the NBA's New York Knicks, and Rick Barry of the ABA's New York Nets.

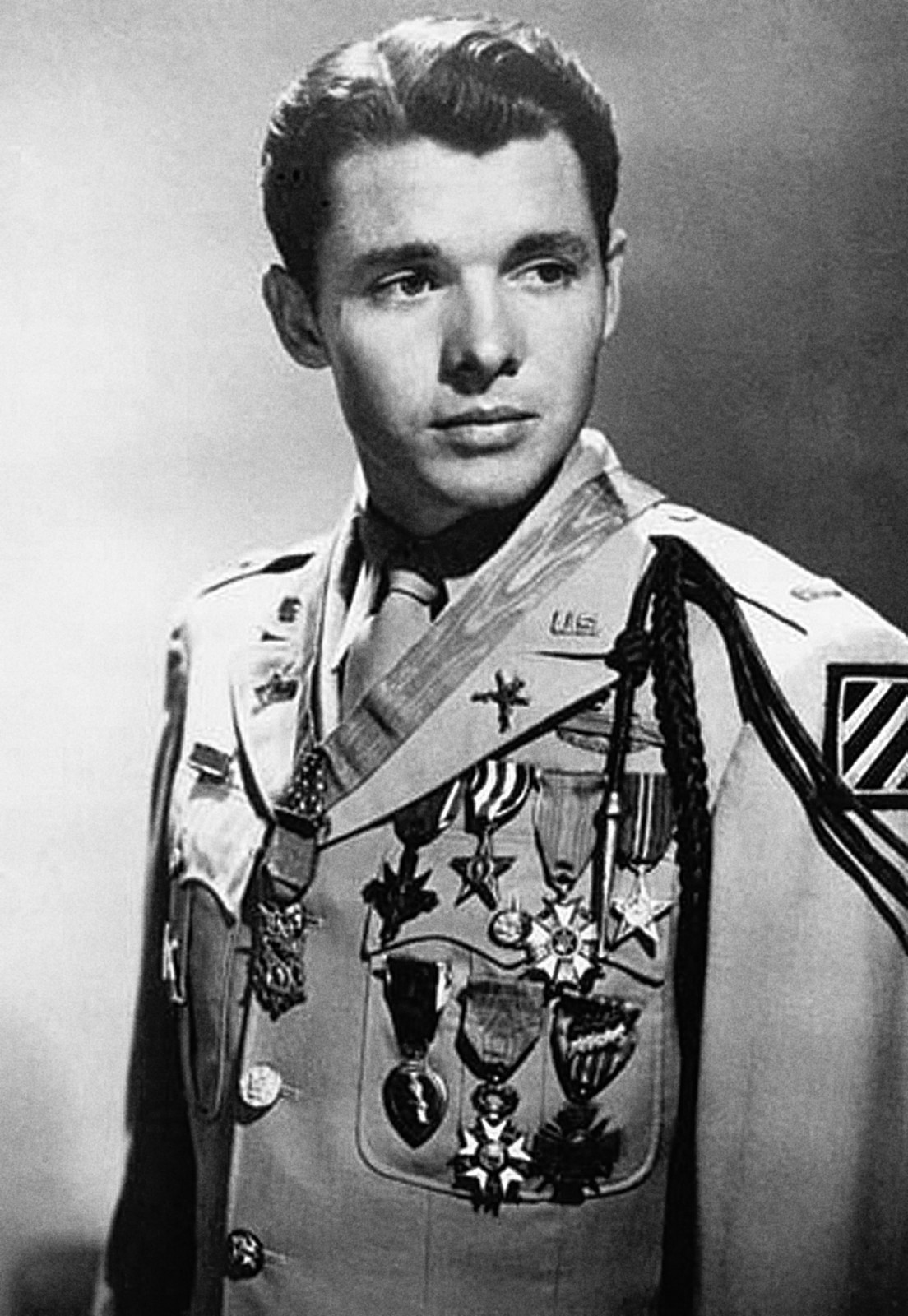
Audie Murphy (d. May 28, 1971)

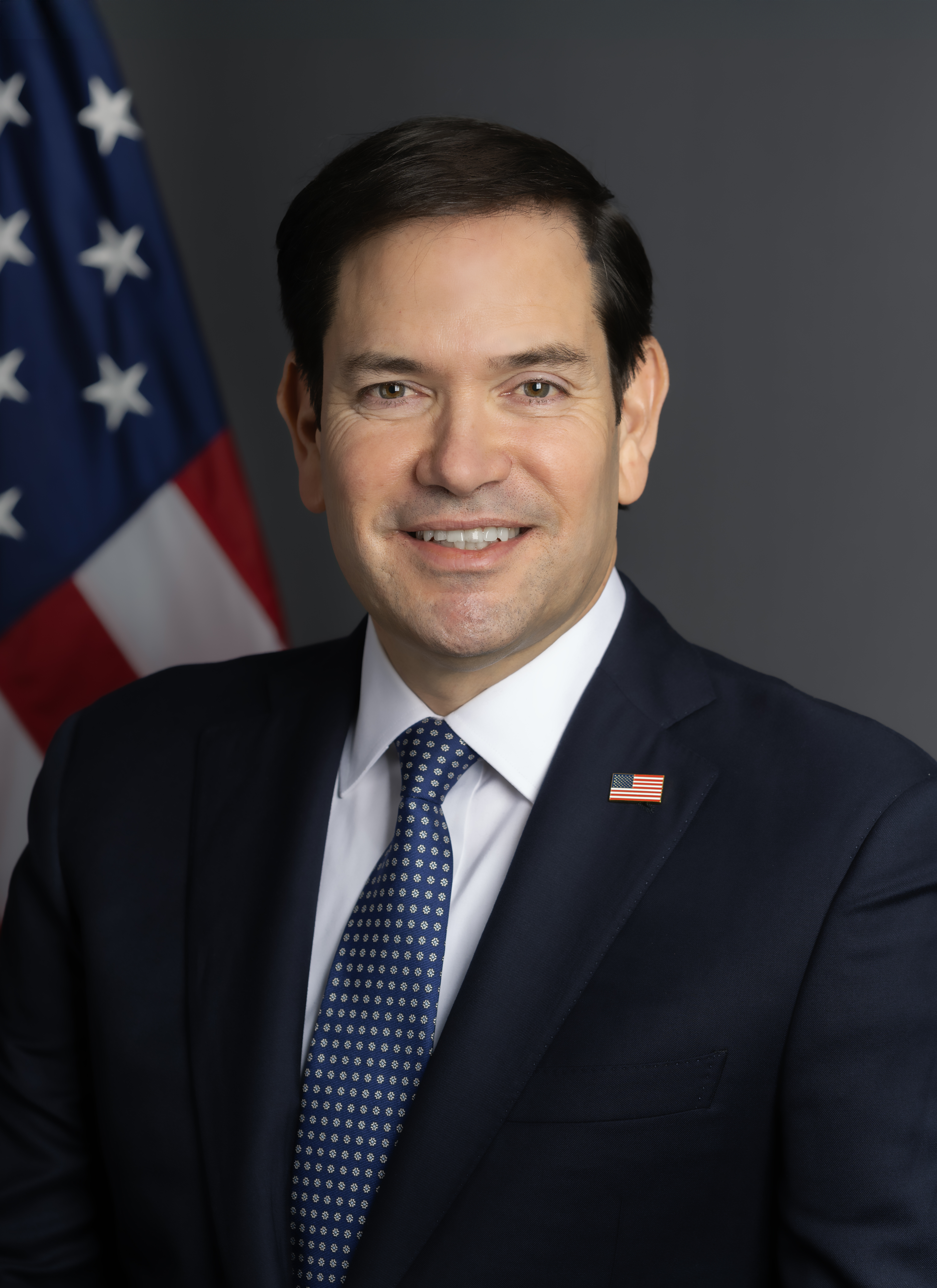
Marco Rubio (b. May 28, 1971)

- Born: Marco Rubio, U.S. Secretary of State since 2025 and former U.S. Senator from Florida from 2011 to 2025; in Miami
- Died: Audie Murphy, 45, "the nation's most-decorated hero of World War II" who was awarded the Medal of Honor, and later became a successful film actor, was killed along with five other people when the plane he was on crashed into Brush Mountain, near Catawba, Virginia. The twin-engine Aero Commander was on its way from Atlanta to Martinsville, Virginia when it went down shortly after 11:00 in the morning, when its pilot radioed that he was going to try to land in Roanoke because of bad weather. The wreckage was found after a two day search.

== May 29, 1971 (Saturday) ==
- The 1971 Indianapolis 500 was won by Al Unser the second year in a row. The race was marred when the pace car skidded into a temporary grandstand packed with photographers, injuring 22 people, some of them seriously.
- The Magic Mountain amusement park opened at Valencia, California, initially charging $5.00 for adults, and $1.50 for children 12 and under, to ride all of the park's roller coasters and other attractions.
- Died:
  - Rayner Goddard, Baron Goddard, 94, Lord Chief Justice of England from 1946 to 1958
  - Rodd Redwing, 66, Native American actor billed as "the world's greatest quick-draw artist", died of a heart attack.

== May 30, 1971 (Sunday) ==
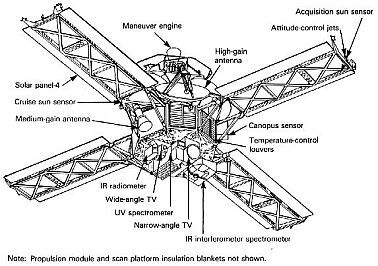
U.S. Mars probe Mariner 9

- Mariner 9 was launched by the U.S. toward Mars at 6:32 p.m. local time from Cape Kennedy, 11 days after the Soviet Union had launched Mars 2. On November 14, it became the first spacecraft from Earth to orbit another planet, when it reached Mars and took photographs, but no attempt to land a probe was made.
- The Battle of Snuol, fought in Cambodia between Army of the Republic of Vietnam (ARVN, South Vietnamese) and North Vietnamese Army (NVA) troops since January 5, ended when the South Vietnamese forces left the area in a predetermined manoeuvre due to the upcoming rainy season in the area.
- About 1,000 people who attended a concert of the Grateful Dead at the Winterland Auditorium in San Francisco sought medical attention after having ingested LSD from apple cider that had been passed around the crowd.
- Born: Duncan Jones, British film director, as Duncan Zowie Haywood Jones to singer David Bowie and his partner, Angie Jones
- Died: Marcel Dupré, 85, French organist, pianist and composer

== May 31, 1971 (Monday) ==
- Beginning with 1971, a three-day Memorial Day Weekend became an annual observance within the U.S. federal government and by nearly all of the U.S. states, as the scheduled Memorial Day was fixed permanently for federal agencies as the last Monday in May, pursuant to the Uniform Monday Holiday Act, Public Law 90-363. From 1868 to 1970, Memorial Day (formerly "Decoration Day") had been observed on May 30, regardless of what day of the week it fell upon.
- The government of South Vietnam announced that it had compiled a list of 660 "sick or wounded" prisoners of war for repatriation to North Vietnam, pursuant to an agreement between the two warring nations, but that 647 of the 660 informed the Saigon government that they did not want to go back to the north. At the time, the U.S. had a list of 339 Americans known to be prisoners of war in the north and had seen the repatriation of the North Vietnamese as a first step in securing the release of the U.S. POWs. The 13 who did agree to go boarded the transport ship USS Upshur on June 3, but were told by the Hanoi government that they could not come back to North Vietnam.
