= Katarina Majerhold =

Philosopher

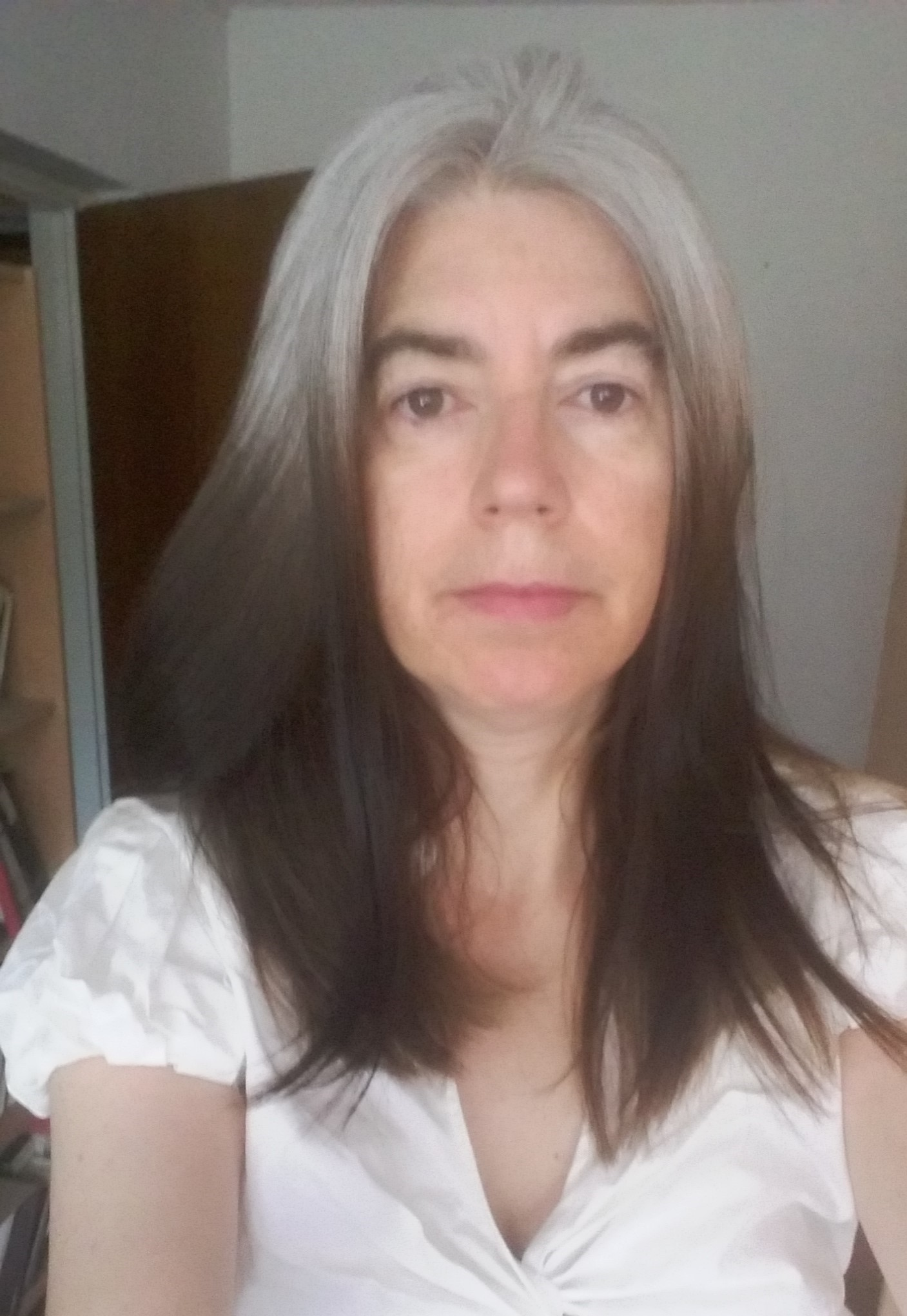
- Born: May 20, 1971 (age 55); Celje, Slovenia
- Citizenship: Slovenian
- Education: University of Ljubljana
- Occupation: Philosopher
- Years active: 1992-
- Height: 170 cm (5 ft 7 in)
- Website: www.katarinamajerhold.si

Katarina Majerhold is a Slovenian philosopher, writer and editor. She is particularly interested in philosophy of emotions, especially in philosophy of love and sexuality, happiness, philosophical counseling and ethics. In 2017 she published an article on the History of Love in the Internet Encyclopedia of Philosophy. She has been a member of Society for the Philosophy of Sex + Love since 1998. In 2020 she wrote her concept of love as a creative dynamic work In which she claims that all known western concepts of love (Plato's, Augustine's, Rousseau's and Freud's alike) are based on lack of something or someone, such as primordial wholeness, God, Mother, whereas she founds her concept of love as happy and peaceful on pragmatical, enthusiastic and ecstatic foundation that promotes personal and couple's happiness, reciprocity, (sexual) satisfaction and creative and intellectual work. Her article The Crisis of the Meaning of Philosophy (2003) was awarded as an essay of the decade by the journal Sodobnost (Modernity or Contemporary Time) in 2012, and reproduced on radio (ARS programme, 2018).

== Career ==
Majerhold has had her own philosophical counseling column in the magazine O osebnosti (2007–2010) and in the Slovenian newspaper, online version Delo.si (2009–2010). She also wrote numerous articles on philosophical counseling and obtained a certificate for philosophical counseling (2007).

She previously worked at the Slovenian Educational Research Institute as a young researcher/assistant. In that time she wrote and edited three books on Slovenian higher education (Ali univerza pleše avtonomno/University and Its Autonomy? (1999), Ali se univerza vrti v krogu svoje moči?/University and Its Power? (2001), Ali univerza potrebuje socialno okolje?/Does University Need Its Social Environment? (2003) Ljubljana, Študentska založba).

Majerhold was the managing editor of the international scientific journal Andragoška spoznanja (Andragogic Perspectives) (2008–2011) and has been a member of the Slovenian Association for the Education of Adults since 2008. She was a member of the editorial board of the magazine on art and culture Sodobnost (Contemporary) (2002–2012) and she has been an editorial board member of the international scientific magazine on social sciences and humanities JKC (1998–). In January 2022, she became the editor-in-chief of the online magazine Apocalypse which publishes about philosophy, art (poetry, literature), and book reviews and in July 2023 became a managing editor of the Časopis za kritiko za znanosti (Journal for Critique of Science/JCS). JCS has introduced its Slovene and international readership to a multitude of various social and humanistic topics. Over the years, JCS has become an indispensable part of Slovene academic life and articles published in the Journal are seen as forming a canonical scientific-academic literature.

In her early career as a philosopher of love she mostly worked on learning of the Western concepts of love and which prevailing concept of love each period in history offered: Empedocles' Love (Eros) and Strife (Neikos), Plato's Eros and Aristotle's Philia, St. Paul's Agape and St. Augustine Caritas, Rousseau's notion of a modern romantic pair of Emile and Sophie, Freud's love as transference and Nussbaum's compassionate, reciprocal, erotic and individual love. However, this does not mean that each representative concept of the period speaks of a totally new or innovative concept of love, many of them are interdependent and/or modification of the other. Majerhold also wrote her own concept of a happy, peaceful and democratic love described as a creative dynamic work.

She published her articles in USA and Brazilian books and American, Canadian and Turkish magazines. She has also written on love, sexuality and emotions: Love in Philosophy(from Plato to Freud, Psihopolis, Novi Sad 2012), Living (Koda, Študentska založba, Ljubljana 2012), Love Through History (Cankarjeva založba, Ljubljana 2015), Love, Its Origin and Modifications Through Time (Založba Obzorja, Maribor, 2016), Čustveni izzivi (Rokus-Klett, Ljubljana, 2017).

In recent years, she has also been involved in translating scientific monographs. She has translated Digitalna doba in novi barbari (The Digital Age and the New Barbarians) by Goran Starčević (KUD Apokalipsa, 2023), Jeza in odpuščanje (Anger and Forgiveness) by Martha C. Nussbaum (Slovenska matica, 2024), Levičarska melanholija (Inštitut ČKZ, 2025) and co-translated Žensko kurdsko gibanje (The Kurdish Women's Movement) by Dilar Dirik (Inštitut ČKZ, 2023).

In 2018, Majerhold created her own website, LL-Passion, where she publishes philosophical essays, reviews of LB-films, series, and interviews with artists, researchers, humanists who are either LB or working in the LGBT field. For example, she interviewed Icelandic novelist and playwright Jónína Leósdóttir, the wife of former Icelandic Prime Minister Johanna Sigurdardottir, a candidate in the upcoming French presidential election in 2022 and vice-chancellor of the University of Lille, Sandrine Rousseau, Claudine Monteil, (retired) French diplomat, feminist and writer who worked with Simone de Beauvoir for 16 years and was one of the founders of the French feminist movement in the 1970s, in 2023, she interviewed the renowned Slovenian-British designer Lara Bohinc, whose jewelry was worn by Kate Moss, Cameron Diaz, and Victoria Beckham, and for many years she collaborated with Gucci, Lanvin, etc., before founding her furniture Bohinc Studio and in 2010 the American philosopher Martha Nussbaum. In 2020 she made an interview with an actress and creator of Avocado Toast Heidi Lynch. Lynch is married to British actress Faye Marsay.

Majerhold identifies as an atheist and a lesbian.

== Bibliography ==
- History of love In: The internet encyclopedia of philosophy : a peer-reviewed academic resource. [Martin, TN]: Internet Encyclopedia of Philosophy Pub., 2017. http://www.iep.utm.edu/love-his/. [COBISS.SI-ID 3106903]
- Love in Philosophy (from Plato to Freud, Psihopolis institut, 2012. 238 str. ISBN 978-86-86653-53-6. [COBISS.SI-ID 269506311]
- Living (Koda, Ljubljana: Študentska založba, 2012. 192 str. ISBN 978-961-242-470-1. [COBISS.SI-ID 260372480]
- The Gift in What Philosophy Can Tell You About Your Lover (Open Court, Chicago and LaSalle, Illinois, 2012).
- The philosophy of clowning as a technique to fight homophobia. 12(2) 2013; pp. 13–16. http://www.apaonline.org https://cdn.ymaws.com/www.apaonline.org/resource/collection/B4B9E534-A677-4F29-8DC9-D75A5F16CC55/V12n2LGBT.pdf
- University and Its Autonomy (Ljubljana, Študentska založba, 1999. [COBISS.SI-ID 106994688]
- University and Its Power (Ljubljana, Študentska založba, 2001. [COBISS.SI-ID 219527168]
- Does University Needs Its Social Environment (Ljubljana, Študentska založba, 2003. [COBISS.SI-ID 126194944]
- Love (screenwriter, documentary on five fundamental concepts of love, such as presented in philosophy, art, biology, medicine and psychoanalysis) (Radio-Television Slovenia 2008)
- Emotions, fabrics of our lives (screenwriter, documentary on importance of emotions in cognition, ethics, politics and art and upbringing, Radio-Television Slovenia 2010)
- The future of clothing (screenwriter, documentary on smart and intelligent textiles, Radio-Television Slovenia 2010)
- Crisis of the Meaning of Philosophy. Ljubljana: Sodobnost, Letnik 76, June 2012, pp. 641–646. http://www.dlib.si/details/URN:NBN:SI:doc-ERPT38HY; https://ars.rtvslo.si/2018/09/esej-na-radiu-129/
- Attraction of Gender (screenwriter, documentary on different kinds of human attraction, heterosexual and homosexual, Radio-Television Slovenia, 2015. 1 video DVD (ca 29 min), barve, zvok. http://4d.rtvslo.si/!arhiv/dokumentarni-filmi-in-oddaje-kulturno-umetniški-program/174312667. [COBISS.SI-ID515808383]
- Love, Its Origin and Modifications Through Time: main philosophical concepts of love through western history. 1st ed. Maribor: Obzorja, 2016. Ilustr. ISBN 978-961-230-506-2. https://www.amazon.com/dp/B01N6O0ECG/ref=rdr_kindle_ext_tmb, https://www.biblos.si/isbn/9789612305062. [COBISS.SI-ID 89745665]
- Čustveni izzivi: prepoznavanje različnih čustev in reševanje čustvenih stisk učencev, (Učiteljeva orodja). 1. izd. Ljubljana: Rokus Klett, 2017. 115 str., tabele. 1 optični tisk (CD-ROM). ISBN 978-961-271-801-5. [COBISS.SI-ID *Emotions (ed. of articles about emotions as part of ethics, democracy, cognition and art. Author of the article about emotions as necessary development condition of a human race)88579584]
- Attractions of Genders (ed. of articles on different kinds of human attraction regardless of sexual orientation and/or sexual identity). Časopis za kritiko znanosti, ISSN 0351-4285, 2017, letn. 45, št. 267, str. 207–218. [COBISS.SI-ID 3102039]
- Kačič, Marino (ed.), Majerhold, Katarina (ed.). Umetnost in hendikep: zbornik prispevkov ob 95. obletnici ZDSSS. Ljubljana: Rikoss: ZDSSS, 2015. Ilustr. ISBN 978-961-91372-8-4.https://dl.dropboxusercontent.com/u/38818780/rikoss/Umetnost%20in%20hendikep%20-%20zbornik.pdf. [COBISS.SI-ID 282686720]
- Zbornik za spodbujanje demokratičnega emancipiranega dialoga med ponudniki kulturnih dobrin ter obiskovalci (ed.). 1. izd. Maribor [i. e.] Ljubljana: Društvo ŠKUC, Galerija Škuc, 2014.
- Majerhold, Katarina (ed.), Turk Niskač, Barbara (ed.), Močnik, Teja (ed.). Child and Childhoods: past, present and future. (Časopis za kritiko znanosti, domišljijo in novo antropologijo, letn. 39, št. 249). Ljubljana: Študentska založba, 2012. 190 str., ilustr. [COBISS.SI-ID 9498697]
