= June 1971 =

Month of 1971

<<	June 1971					>>
Su	Mo	Tu	We	Th	Fr	Sa
		1	2	3	4	5
6	7	8	9	10	11	12
13	14	15	16	17	18	19
20	21	22	23	24	25	26
27	28	29	30

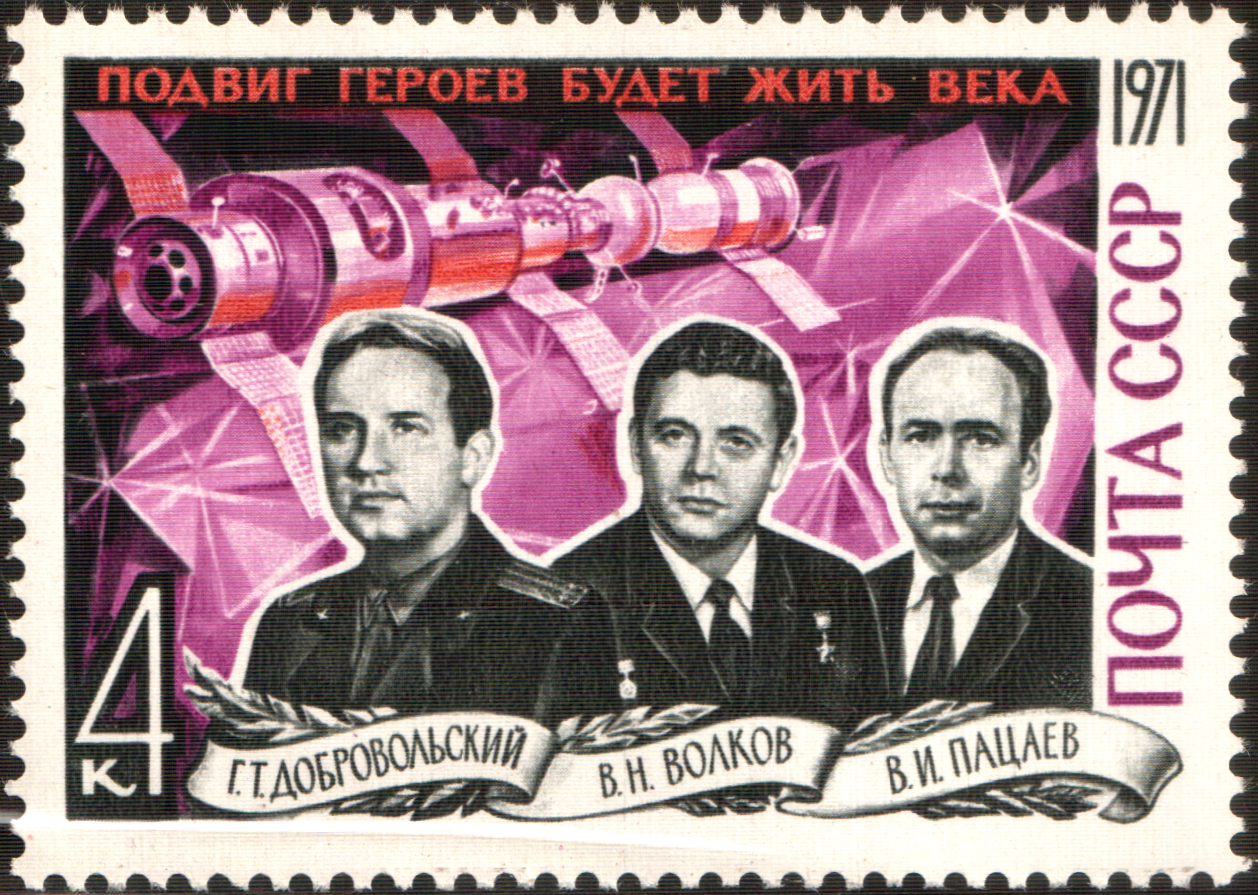
June 30, 1971: Soviet cosmonauts Dobrovolsky, Volkov, Patsayev killed in Soyuz 11 mission accident

The following events occurred in June 1971:

== June 1, 1971 (Tuesday) ==
- Vietnam Veterans for a Just Peace, an organization claiming to represent the majority of U.S. Vietnam War veterans who served in Southeast Asia, sponsored an event to speak against war protests.
- The East Pakistan Razakar Ordinance, promulgated by Pakistan Army General Tikka Khan, made the Razakars, a paramilitary organization that has carried out massacres of Bengali civilians in East Pakistan, recognized members of the Pakistan Army.
- Died: Reinhold Niebuhr, 78, American theologian and political commentator

== June 2, 1971 (Wednesday) ==
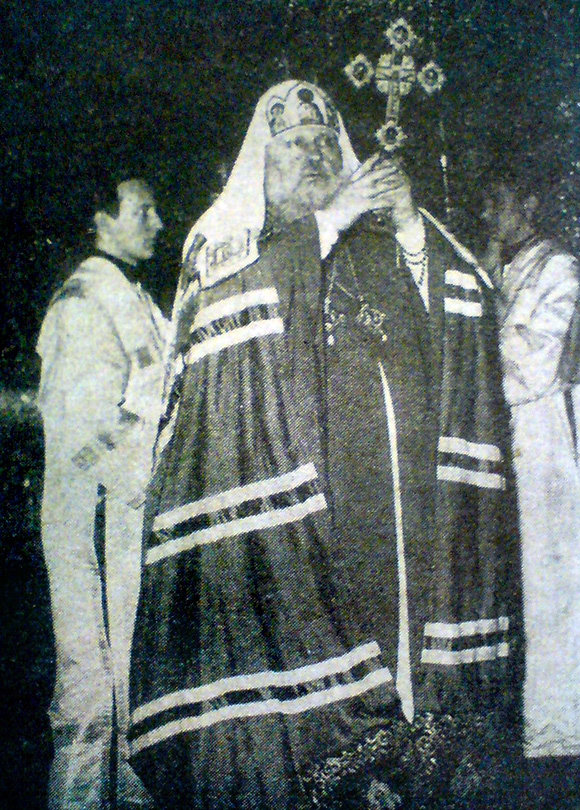
Patriarch Pimen I

- Sergey Mikhailovich Izvekov was elected by bishops of the Russian Orthodox Church to be the new Patriarch of Moscow, leader of the Church, and took the name Pimen. As Pimen the First, he was enthroned the next day.
- Ajax Amsterdam of the Netherlands defeated Panathinaikos of Athens in Greece, 2 to 0, to win soccer football's European Cup Final, held at Wembley Stadium in England before a crowd of 83,179.
- The first issue of the daily newspaper Al Ra'i (literally The Opinion), owned by the government of Jordan, was published, in Amman.
- Born:
  - Rustam Sharipov, Ukrainian gymnast and 1992 Olympic gold medalist; in Dushanbe, Tajik SSR, Soviet Union
  - Anthony Montgomery, American television actor known for Star Trek: Enterprise; in Indianapolis, Indiana

== June 3, 1971 (Thursday) ==
- Jimmy Hoffa, president of the International Brotherhood of Teamsters, announced from prison that he would not be running for re-election for president of the labor union. Hoffa had been incarcerated at the federal penitentiary in Lewisburg, Pennsylvania for the past four years for pension fraud and attempted jury fixing.

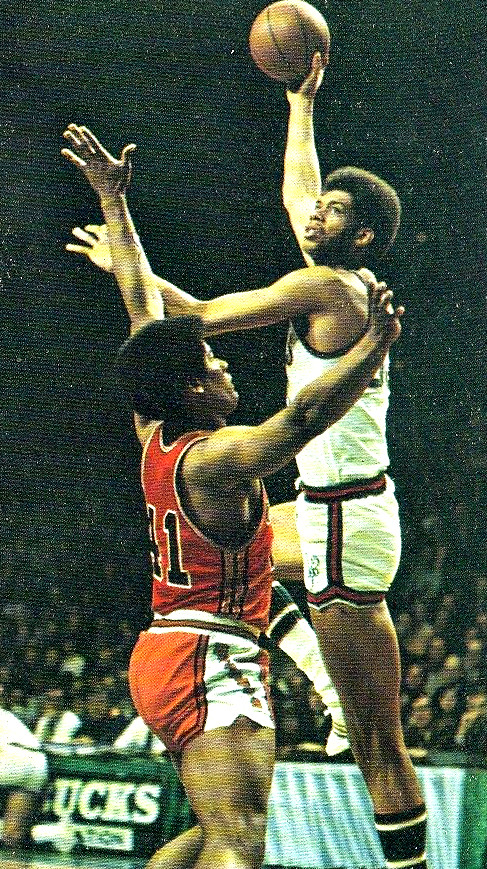
Abdul-Jabbar, formerly Alcindor

- Lew Alcindor, winner in 1970 of the NBA's Most Valuable Player award, announced that he had changed his name to Kareem Abdul-Jabbar. The former Alcindor says that he had chosen the name in 1968 after converting from Roman Catholicism to Islam, and that "Kareem" means "noble", "Abdul" was "servant of Allah" and "Jabbar" means "powerful".
- In the second of two games of the 1971 Inter-Cities Fairs Cup Final, held in Leeds, Leeds United F.C. played to a 1–1 draw with Juventus FC, after a 2–2 tie at Turin. Leeds was awarded the win based on a tiebreaker, based on "away goals," having had 2 goals in Italy compared to one goal by Juventus in Leeds.
- The comedy No Sex Please, We're British, opened at the Strand Theatre, beginning a 16-year run that would make it the eighth longest-running stage production in London's West End.
- Born: Luigi Di Biagio, Italian footballer and caretaker for the Italian National Team from 2018 to 2020; in Rome
- Died: Gertrud Natzler, 63, Austrian-American artist who popularized ceramics art

== June 4, 1971 (Friday) ==
- Kosmos 426 was launched by the Soviet Union as part of the Dnepropetrovsk Sputnik programme, for the purpose of studying charged particles and radiation in the Earth's magnetosphere. It operates for six months, but remains in orbit until 2002.
- United Airlines Flight 796, a Boeing 737-200 with 72 people on board, in a flight from Charleston, West Virginia, to Newark, New Jersey, United States, was hijacked by a drunk passenger, Glen Elmo Riggs, who demanded to be flown to Israel. The plane diverted to Washington Dulles International Airport in Virginia, where Riggs was overpowered.
- Born:
  - Joseph Kabila, President of the Democratic Republic of the Congo from 2001 to 2019); in Rwanda
  - Ekrem İmamoğlu, Turkish politician and Mayor of Istanbul; in Trabzon
  - Noah Wylie, American TV actor known for the medical drama ER and The Pitt, and 2026 winner of an Emmy, a Golden Globe and a Critics' Choice award; in Hollywood, Los Angeles

== June 5, 1971 (Saturday) ==
- The Six Flags Over Mid-America theme park was opened in St. Louis, Missouri.
- West Germany's premier soccer football league, the Bundesliga, completed its regular season, with Borussia Mönchengladbach (with 20 wins and 10 draws) finishing in first place ahead of Bayern Munich (19 wins and 10 draws), after Munich lost, 0 to 2, to MSV Duisburg and Mönchengladbach defeated Eintracht Frankfurt, 4 to 1.
- Born: Mark Wahlberg, American film actor and producer, and former rap artist who had founded Marky Mark and the Funky Bunch; in Boston.
- Died: André Trocmé, 70, French pacifist pastor and war hero

== June 6, 1971 (Sunday) ==
- Soyuz 11, with cosmonauts Vladislav Volkov, Georgi Dobrovolski and Viktor Patsayev, was launched from Baikonur Cosmodrome at 10:55 in the morning local time (0455 UTC) for rendezvous with the Salyut-1 space station.
- All 44 passengers and five crew members aboard Hughes Airwest Flight 706 were killed when the McDonnell Douglas DC-9 jetliner collided with a U.S. Marine Corps F-4B Phantom jet fighter in the skies over Duarte, California. After the mid-air collision, the DC-9 crashed into a remote canyon in the San Gabriel Mountains near Mount Bliss, approximately three miles north of Duarte. One of the two crew survived the crash of the F-4B in another canyon.
- A special train from Moorgate to Neasden depot, comprising No. L94 (ex-GWR 5700 Class No. 7752) and a selection of maintenance rolling stock, was run by London Transport to mark the end of its time operating steam locomotives.
- Died: Sergei Denisov, 61, Soviet fighter pilot and twice awarded holder of the Hero of the Soviet Union medal

== June 7, 1971 (Monday) ==
- Philippine government official Manuel Elizalde, the head of the PANAMIN Foundation (Presidential Assistant on National Minorities), reported that he had discovered the Tasaday people, purported to be an isolated tribe, described as living in the "Stone Age", on the island of Mindanao, in the rain forest near Lake Sebu. For the next 15 years, contact with the Tasadays was restricted by the Philippine government, but after the fall of the regime of President Ferdinand Marcos, anthropologists were permitted to study the tribe further, discovering that the supposed cave people were living nearby in modern conditions and that Elizaide's discovery has been a hoax. The Australian Broadcasting Company would later produce a TV documentary called "The Tribe that Never Was" revealing the government had hired what would be described as "rain forest clock punchers".
- The three Soyuz 11 cosmonauts become the first humans in history to step aboard an orbiting space station after their capsule successfully docked with Salyut 1.
- All but three of 30 people on Allegheny Airlines Flight 485 died when the Convair CV-580 crashed on landing at New Haven, Connecticut and the plane burst into flames. The aircraft plowed through three vacant summer cottages and set fire to a fourth one, but the dwellings "were unoccupied because the season had not yet begun and no one on the ground was injured". Although all but one person survived the initial impact, the people killed had been unable to open the emergency exit.
- The government of Pakistan issued a decree removing the two highest denominations of the Pakistani rupee paper currency notes from circulation and setting a deadline for citizens to exchange their 500-rupee and 100-rupee banknotes in return for a receipt promising new notes at some point in the next few weeks. The decision came after Bangladesh separatists in East Pakistan had flooded West Pakistan with counterfeited currency.
- In Silver Spring, Maryland, the federal Alcohol Tobacco Firearms Division (ATFD) raided the home of Kenyon F. Ballew, beginning a cause célèbre in the debates between advocates of gun control and advocates of gun owner rights in the U.S.
- Died:
  - J. I. Rodale, 72, American nutritionist, author and pioneer in organic gardening, died of a heart attack while appearing as a guest for the taping of The Dick Cavett Show that was scheduled to be shown that evening. After telling Cavett in the interview, "I've decided to live to be a hundred. I never felt better in my life," Rodale appeared to fall asleep while Cavett was interviewing his other guest, newspaper columnist Pete Hamill.
  - Leo Burnett, 79, American advertising executive and creator of memorable ad campaign characters including "Tony the Tiger", the "Maytag Repairman" and slogans like "You're in Good Hands" for Allstate Insurance.
  - Camille Gutt, 86, Belgian economist and politician and the first managing director of the International Monetary Fund, from 1946 to 1951
  - Dr. Rolla Dyer, 84, U.S. physician and director of the National Institutes of Health from 1942 to 1950

== June 8, 1971 (Tuesday) ==
- In Chile, a terrorist squad assassinated Edmundo Pérez Zujovic, an opponent of President Salvador Allende and the former Vice President of Chile for Allende's predecessor Eduardo Frei.
- Born: Mark Feuerstein, U.S. actor, in New York City
- Died: Onni Hiltunen, 75, Finnish politician who briefly served as the Deputy Prime Minister of Finland

== June 9, 1971 (Wednesday) ==
- King Bhumibol Adulyadej of Thailand celebrated his Silver Jubilee.
- Abdul Zahir replaced Mohammad Nur Ahmad Etemadi as Prime Minister of Afghanistan.
- The helicopter museum of the German Army Aviation Corps, opened at Bückeburg.
- Born: Deahnne McIntyre, Australian paralympic gold medalist in women's powerlifting, in Canberra.

== June 10, 1971 (Thursday) ==
- The U.S. ended its trade embargo of the People's Republic of China, more than 21 years after China came under control of the Chinese Communist Party. U.S. President Richard Nixon authorizes the American export of "nonstrategic items" and lifts all controls on imports from China.
- Almost 120 protesting students were killed by "Los Halcones", a paramilitary group trained by the Mexican government.
- Amtrak had its first fatal accident when 11 people were killed and 163 injured in the derailment of the City of New Orleans train near Tonti, Illinois.
- The U.S. and the Soviet Union exchanged samples of lunar soil after representatives met in Moscow to sign an agreement on expanding co-operation in space research. NASA official Lee R. Scherer provided six grams of material gathered by the Apollo 11 and Apollo 12 missions, and Aleksandr V. Vinogratov of the Soviet Academy of Sciences gave Scherer three grams collected by the uncrewed lunar probe Luna 16
- Born: Piyush "Bobby" Jindal, the first U.S. state governor of South Indian ancestry, Governor of Louisiana from 2008 to 2016; in Baton Rouge, Louisiana
- Died: Michael Rennie, 61, English actor best known for the lead role as Klaatu in the science fiction film The Day the Earth Stood Still

== June 11, 1971 (Friday) ==
- The Occupation of Alcatraz came to an end after 19 months during which American Indians from various tribes occupied Alcatraz Island off of the coast of California and lived in the closed Alcatraz federal penitentiary. A group of 79 Indians had seized control of the island on November 20, 1969; by the time the last group was evacuated, only 15 were occupying the island.
- At O'Hare International Airport in Chicago, TWA Flight 358, with 26 people on board preparing to depart for John F. Kennedy International Airport in New York City, was boarded by armed hijacker Gregory White, who demanded to be flown to North Vietnam, and killed a passenger, Howard Franks. The passengers stampeded, and White was apprehended by an armed deputy who shot and wounded the hijacker while the airliner landed safely at New York. Franks, 65 years old, became the first U.S. airline passenger to be killed during a hijacking.
- Died:
  - Ambrose, 74, British bandleader and violinist
  - Isabel Gonzalez, 89, Puerto Rican political activist

== June 12, 1971 (Saturday) ==
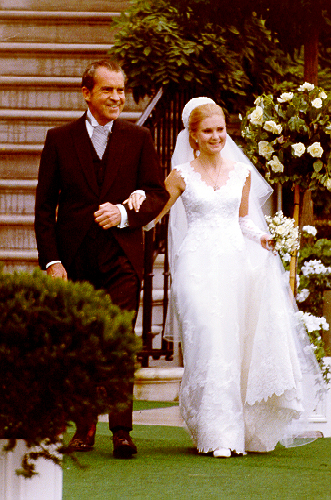
The last White House wedding

- In the last wedding to be held at the White House in Washington DC, U.S. President Nixon's daughter Tricia Nixon married attorney Edward F. Cox at the White House Rose Garden.
- Died: Franklyn MacCormack, 65, American radio personality

== June 13, 1971 (Sunday) ==
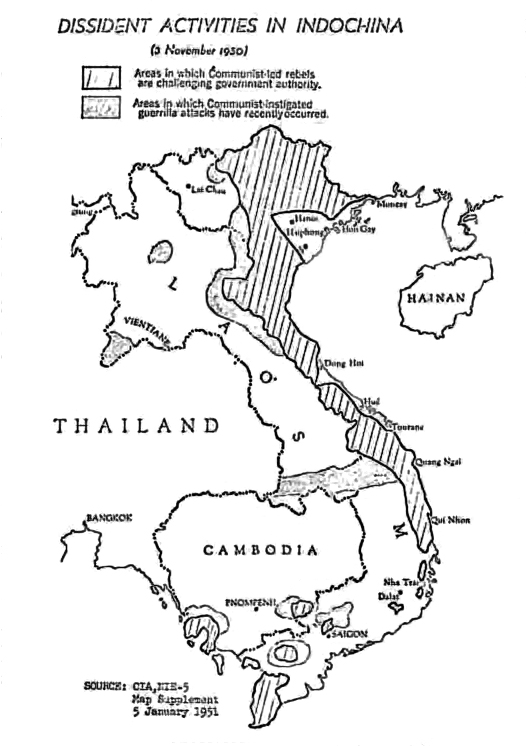
Part of the leaked "Pentagon Papers"

- The New York Times began to publish the Pentagon Papers, secret memoranda from the U.S. Department of Defense regarding U.S. strategy during the Vietnam War, that had been provided to investigative journalist Neil Sheehan.
- The Sunday Times in London published the first news of the massacres in East Pakistan of the predominantly Hindu Bengali population by the Army of Pakistan and its paramilitary partners, the Razakars. Written by Karachi journalist Anthony Mascarenhas, who fled with his family to London prior to publication, the story bore the headline "GENOCIDE".
- In Australia, Mrs. Geraldine Brodrick of Canberra became only the second person known to give birth to nonuplets, bearing nine babies in 35 minutes at the Royal Hospital for Women in Randwick, New South Wales, a suburb of Sydney. Two were stillborn; the other seven, three boys and four girls weighing between one and two pounds, survived for only a few days, with last one, a boy, dying after six days.
- The Philippine sightseeing boat Edisco, with more than 100 people on board, capsized in Manila Bay when passengers rushed to one side of the boat to get out of the way of spray blowing from the ocean. Twenty-eight people were killed, while 80 more were rescued by nearby fishing boats and cruisers. The passengers were returning after a holiday excursion to the island of Corregidor.
- All 24 people aboard a U.S. Air Force C-135 jet transport were presumed dead after the aircraft disappeared into the Pacific Ocean after departing from Pago Pago in American Samoa to return to Hickham Air Force Base in Honolulu. The last radar contact had been when the jet had passed Palmyra Atoll. The aircraft carried 12 civilian technicians and 12 U.S. Air Force personnel, of whom eight were from the Aeronautical Systems Division, and the jet was monitoring a nuclear test by France. Debris from the plane was found, but no bodies were located.
- Elections were held in Iceland for the 40 seats of the Althing, Iceland's unicameral parliament, breaking up the socialist-conservative coalition government led by Prime Minister Johann Hafstein. While Hafstein's Sjálfstæðisflokkurinn (Independence Party) retains its 15-seat plurality, his coalition partner, the Althithuflokkurinn (Social Democratic Party) lost five seats, leading to Hafstein's resignation and the creation of a new coalition led by the Framsóknarflokkurinn (Progressive Party) of Ólafur Jóhannesson.
- American professional wrestling star Alberto Torres was fatally injured in a tag team match held at the town of Verdigre, Nebraska. Torres, who was matched against Douglas "Ox" Baker, died four days later at a hospital in Omaha.
- Doug Mew became the first person to swim across "The Rip", a dangerous waterway (because of its riptide and its rocky seabed) between Point Lonsdale and Point Nepean in Australia's State of Victoria. A plaque was later erected at Point Lonsdale to commemorate his accomplishment.
- Former Soviet Communist Party leader and Premier Nikita Khrushchev made his first public appearance since being removed from office in 1964. Khrushchev had come to Moscow to cast a vote in elections for the approval of the Party's Moscow representatives at the RSFSR's republic legislature.

== June 14, 1971 (Monday) ==
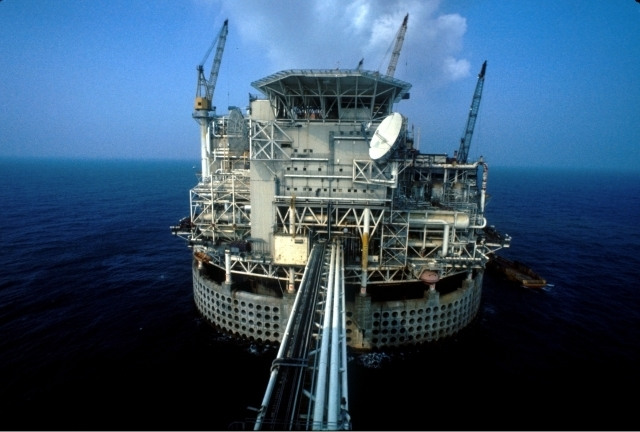
Norway's first North Sea oil platform, Ekofisk-1

- Norway began oil production in the North Sea as the Ekofisk oil field pumped its first petroleum from a rig of the Phillips Petroleum Company. At the rate of 1,000 barrels per day, the oil was pumped into the oil tanker Theotokos for delivery to a Norwegian refinery.
- The first Hard Rock Cafe was opened in London by American entrepreneurs Isaac Tigrett and Peter Morton.

== June 15, 1971 (Tuesday) ==
- U.S. Senator Mike Gravel (D-Alaska) received a copy of the Pentagon Papers from Ben Bagdikian, an editor at The Washington Post.
- The New York Times is ordered to halt further publication of the Pentagon Papers after the U.S. Department of Justice files a petition in the U.S. District Court for New York. Judge Murray I. Gurfein enters an injunction barring publication for at least four days in order to hear the case.
- Bill Briggs became the first person to perform extreme skiing in North America and the first to ski down the side of the steep 13,770 ft (4,200 m) Grand Teton mountain. After finding that nobody at the ski resort town of Jackson Hole believed him, Briggs contacted the owner of the local newspaper, who sent a staff photographer to photograph the peak and Dawson's ski tracks.
- The stolen modello painting that served as the model by 17th-century artist El Greco (Doménikos Theotokópoulos) in 1607 for his masterpiece, The Virgin of The Immaculate Conception, signed by around 1607, was recovered by the FBI, almost 35 years after it had been stolen from a museum in Spain. The FBI issued a statement two days later that it had been found in the home of a New York City jeweler, not otherwise identified and that the modello, itself a masterpiece, was returned to the Museo de Santa Cruz in the Spanish city of Toledo. The modello had been stolen from the home of its owner, Don Juan de Seigas y Marin, on July 18, 1936 during the Spanish Civil War.
- The first KH-9 Hexagon U.S. spy satellite was launched into orbit, from Vandenberg Air Force Base in California.
- Born: Bif Naked, Canadian singer, poet and actress, as Beth Torbert in New Delhi, India
- Died:
  - Wendell Meredith Stanley, 66, American biochemist and 1946 Nobel Prize laureate
  - Sathyaneshan Nadar, 58, Indian film actor in Malayalam cinema, died of leukemia, a few months after the filming and release of his final movie, Kuttiyedahti.

== June 16, 1971 (Wednesday) ==
- The U.S. Senate defeated a resolution sponsored by Senators George S. McGovern of South Dakota and Mark O. Hatfield of Oregon, both Democrats, a proposed amendment to a bill extending the draft, that would have set a deadline of December 31, 1971, to withdraw all U.S. military forces from Indochina. The final vote was 42 for and 55 against. A compromise resolution that would have set a deadline of June 1, 1972, was defeated, 52 to 14. A similar resolution in the U.S. House of Representatives was defeated the next day, 158 to 253, with 105 Democrats and 149 Republicans voting against it.
- Australia's Experimental Military Unit was withdrawn from Vietnam.
- Born:
  - Tupac Shakur, American rapper, poet, and actor, as Parish Lesane Crooks in Brooklyn, New York City; (murdered, 1996)
  - Chris Gomez, American baseball infielder (San Diego Padres), born in Los Angeles, California.
  - Daliah Wachs, American radio host, born in Los Angeles, California.

== June 17, 1971 (Thursday) ==
- U.S. President Nixon began the "war on drugs", declaring in a nationwide address that "America's public enemy number one in the United States was drug abuse. In order to fight and defeat this enemy, it was necessary to wage a new, all-out offensive."
- The Okinawa Reversion Agreement was signed simultaneously in Tokyo and in Washington DC by U.S. Secretary of State William P. Rogers and Japanese Minister for Foreign Affairs Kiichi Aichi, whereby the U.S. agreed to return control of Okinawa Island, the Daito Islands and the Ryuku Islands to Japan, while still allowing the United States Forces Japan to maintain bases on the island. The U.S. had captured the island of Okinawa on July 2, 1945, after a 98-day battle that claimed the lives of over 20,000 Americans and over 110,000 Japanese.
- U.S. truck manufacturer Mack Trucks, Inc. announced that it had signed a contract with the government of the Soviet Union, subject to U.S. government approval, for Mack to design and supply equipment for the Russians to use for the KAMAZ truck factory, under construction in the Russian SFSR at Naberezhnye Chelny on the Kama River. The agreement, which would double the volume of U.S. exports to the U.S.S.R., had been executed on May 18 but not revealed until June 17 at the request of the Nixon administration.
- A 13-year-old girl became the first of at least 34 murder victims whose killer would leave the body in a 25-acre (10 hectares) patch of land in Galveston County, Texas, dubbed the "Texas Killing Fields". The body of 13-year-old Colette Wilson, of Alvin, Texas, was found on November 26 near League City. Seven other female victims, ranging in age from 12 to 19, would disappear before the end of 1971.
- A drunken Jim Morrison made a recording in a Paris studio with two equally inebriated American street musicians he had befriended shortly before.
- Born: Paulina Rubio, Mexican singer and actress, in Mexico City
- Died: Paruyr Sevak, 47, Soviet Armenian poet and dissident, was killed in an automobile accident along with his wife.

== June 18, 1971 (Friday) ==
- In the U.S. state of Texas, Southwest Airlines, a low-cost carrier, began its first flights, starting with service in Dallas, to-and-from Houston and San Antonio.
- The Washington Post independently began its own publication of the Pentagon Papers that had been provided to it by Daniel Ellsberg, even though The New York Times had been enjoined from publishing. The Post received a call from William Rehnquist, at the time the head of the Department of Justice Office of Legal Counsel.
- Carole King gave her first performance in front of an audience. A recording of the concert was released as an album in 1996.
- Died:
  - Paul Karrer, 82, Swiss chemist and 1937 Nobel Prize in Chemistry laureate for his discovery of the chemical structure of vitamins
  - Libby Holman, 67, American singer, actress and civil rights activist, committed suicide

== June 19, 1971 (Saturday) ==
- At least 64 people were killed at a Muslim mosque in the town of Manili in the Cotabato province on the Philippines island of Mindanao after members of the minority Moro community were invited to a meeting to discuss a truce between Muslims and Christians. Members of the Ilaga, a paramilitary group that served as an auxiliary to the Philippine Constabulary accused the Moros of stockpiling firearms, then used hand grenades to kill as many people in the mosque as possible, following up by killing the survivors.
- The championship game of the DFB-Pokal, West Germany's annual professional soccer football tournament for members of the Bundesliga first and second division teams, was won by Bayern Munich in extra time over FC Köln, 2 to 1 in front of 71,000 spectators at Stuttgart.
- Died: Garfield Wood, 90, American inventor

== June 20, 1971 (Sunday) ==
- Jacky Ickx of Belgium won the 1971 Dutch Grand Prix auto race at Zandvoort, held in a pouring rain and on a slick race track, finishing four seconds ahead of Pedro Rodríguez of Mexico
- The Coupe de France, trophy for the highest-level professional soccer football tournament in France, was won by Stade Rennais, 1 to 0, over Olympique Lyonnais at the Olympic Stadium in Colombes before a crowd of 46,801.
- The second of the NBA-ABA All-Star games took place in Indianapolis in a format where the West All-Stars and the East All-Stars were composed of players from both leagues. The West All-Stars, which included George McGinnis of the ABA Indiana Pacers and Earl "the Pearl" Monroe of the NBA New York Knicks, defeated the East All-Stars, 111 to 100.
- In western Turkey, near Afyonkarahisar, 33 people were killed and 24 injured in the collision of a bus and a truck.
- Died:
  - Frances Roth, 75, American lawyer who founded the New Haven Restaurant Institute, now called The Culinary Institute of America
  - Joseph Pearson, 90, British-born Australian zoologist namesake of Pearson's long-clawed shrew (Solisorex pearsoni)

== June 21, 1971 (Monday) ==
- The International Court of Justice, commonly known as "The World Court", ruled 13 to 2 in an advisory opinion that South Africa's occupation of the trust territory of South-West Africa (now Namibia) was illegal and that its administration of the territory should halt at once. The British and French judges opposed the ruling, and South Africa's government refused to abide by the World Court's judgment. South African Prime Minister John Vorster called the decision "an international political vendetta" and said that South Africa was administering South-West Africa "with a view to self-determination for all population groups".
- Golfer Lee Trevino won the U.S. Open in an 18-hole playoff against Jack Nicklaus, after both players had identical scores of 280 the day before. Trevino had 68 and Nicklaus 71 in the 3-stroke win.
- Britain began new negotiations in Luxembourg, led by Geoffrey Rippon, for EEC membership. By the morning of June 23, more than 40 hours of talks resulted in the United Kingdom's entry into the Common Market.

== June 22, 1971 (Tuesday) ==
- For the first time since the Vietnam War began, the U.S. Senate voted for a pullout of all troops, but only on the condition that North Vietnam and the Viet Cong release American prisoners of war. The vote, an amendment to the authorization of an extension of the draft, passed, 57 to 42, and was sent to the House of Representatives. The House rejected the amendment six days later by a vote of 176 for and 219 against.
- Born:
  - Kurt Warner, American football quarterback, who went from being a bagger in an Iowa supermarket to becoming the NFL's Most Valuable Player; in Burlington, Iowa
  - Laila Rouass, British actress, in London

== June 23, 1971 (Wednesday) ==
- "Inhibition of Prostaglandin Synthesis as a Mechanism of Action for Aspirin-like Drugs", a paper by University of London pharmacologist John R. Vane, was published in the scientific journal Nature New Biology, providing his findings that would later earn him the Nobel Prize in Physiology or Medicine, that aspirin and similar pain relievers work by inhibiting the release of prostaglandin.
- After a marathon negotiating session that lasted until 5:00 in the morning in Luxembourg, representatives of the European Economic Community (EEC) and the United Kingdom came to an agreement on terms for the UK to enter the Community and to join the Common Market. Among the points of dispute resolved, the two sides agreed that the UK's payment to the EEC for its first year would be 100 million British pounds (equivalent at the time to US$240,000,000), to be trebled by 1978.
- In "a stock offering that made Wall Street history... because it no doubt will establish a precedent for public ownership of many of the other Wall Street houses, Merrill Lynch became the second Wall Street stockbroking firm to go public. The initial price a share of Merrill Lynch common stock was $28.00 as part of raising $112,000,000 through sales.
- The government of Poland turned over ownership of 6,900 former German church buildings and parsonages to the Roman Catholic Church, in a new law that provided for the transfer in those archdioceses in territory acquired from Germany at the end of World War II. The transfer, dated retroactively to the beginning of the 1971, fulfilled a promise made by Polish United Workers Party Chairman Edward Gierek as part of ending the December riots. Many of the churches that became Catholic houses of worship had formerly been used by German Lutherans.

== June 24, 1971 (Thursday) ==
- Seventeen construction workers were killed by a natural gas explosion while drilling a tunnel beneath Sylmar, California. Carrying out an expansion of the Metropolitan Water District of Southern California, the 18-member crew was 250 feet (76 m) below the Los Angeles suburb when the accident happened, and only one survived.
- The Kosmos 428 military reconnaissance satellite was launched by the Soviet Union.
- Born: Ursula Meier, French-born Swiss film director; in Besançon

== June 25, 1971 (Friday) ==
- The Death of Actaeon, a 16th-century masterpiece painting by the Italian Renaissance painter Titian (Tiziano Vecelli) was purchased at an auction in London for £1.6 million (the equivalent of $4,032,000) by an American art dealer, Julius Weitzner. At the time, the amount paid at the auction by Christie's was the second highest ever for a painting, but much less than the three million pounds that had been forecast within the London art community.
- Born: Angela Kinsey, American TV actress known for the U.S. version of the sitcom The Office; in Lafayette, Louisiana
- Died: John Boyd Orr, 90, Scottish physician and biologist, recipient of the Nobel Prize in Physiology or Medicine

== June 26, 1971 (Saturday) ==
- In Paris, French tightrope walker Philippe Petit gained worldwide fame after stringing a 100 lb (45 kg) steel cable between the two towers of the Notre Dame Cathedral in Paris and then spent the next few hours walking back and forth across the wire without a safety net or a balancing pole, juggling balls and laying down, all 225 ft (69 m) above the ground. After Petit climbed down, Paris police took him to a nearby precinct headquarters for a check of his identity, then accompanied him to make sure that he dismantled his high-wire equipment, and released him without filing charges.
- Died: Johannes Frießner, 79, German World War II general

== June 27, 1971 (Sunday) ==
- Elections were held in Japan for 126 of the 252 seats of the House of Councillors, the upper house of the Japanese parliament. Although the Liberal Democratic Party (LDP) maintained its control of the Councillors, losing only three seats, the Japan Socialist party made some gains, taking 28 of the "constituency" seats for district representatives, and 39 of the at-large national seats.
- U.S. concert promoter Bill Graham closed the legendary Fillmore East venue, which had first opened on 2nd Avenue in New York City in 1968.
- Born: Dipendra Bir Birkam, Crown Prince of Nepal; in Kathmandu (committed suicide, 2001)

== June 28, 1971 (Monday) ==
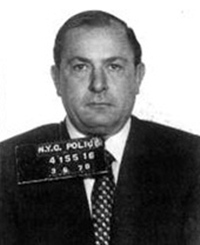
Shooting victim Colombo

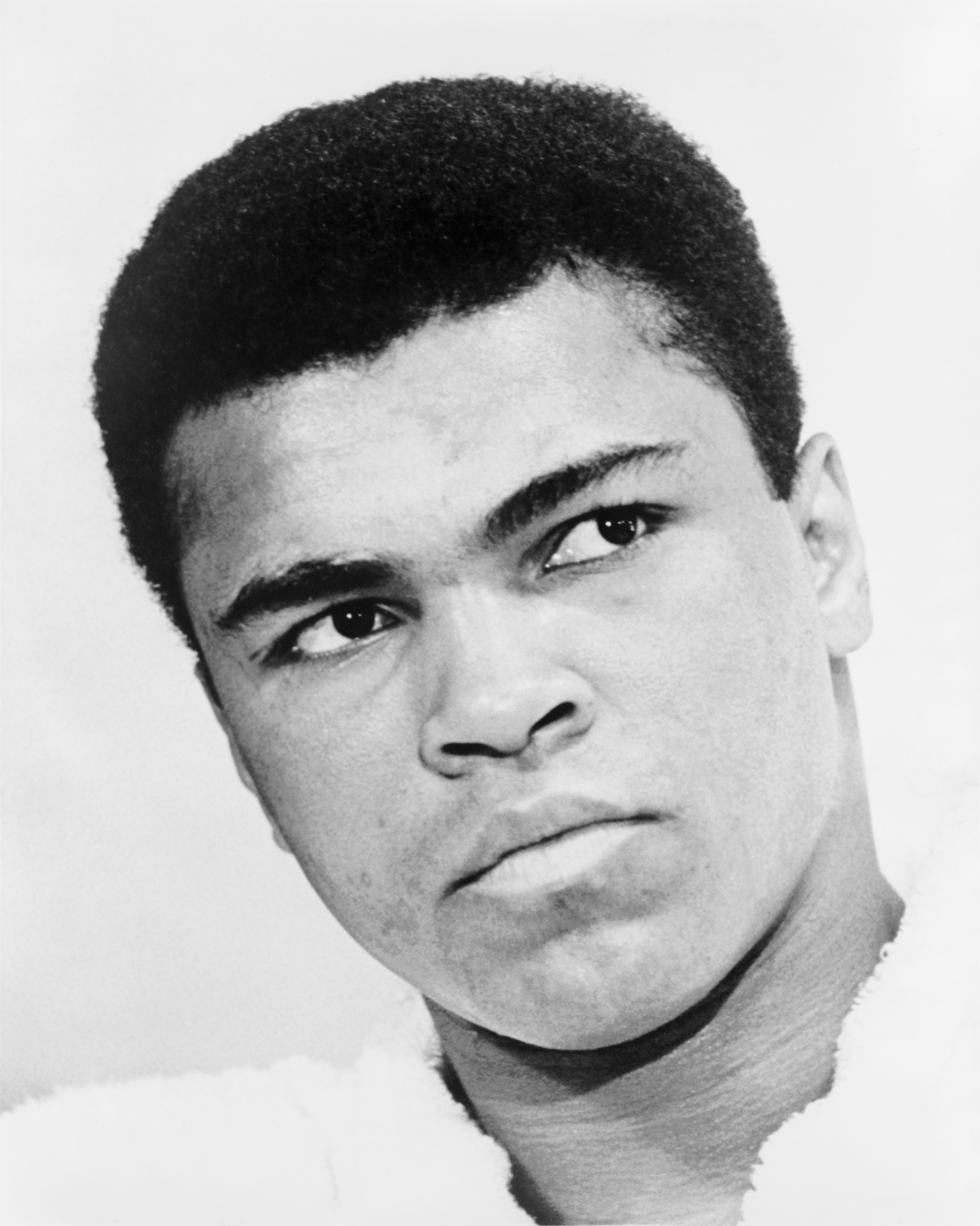
Vindicated boxer Ali

- Reputed Brooklyn Mafia chief Joseph Colombo was shot in the head during the Italian-American Civil Rights League "Unity Day" rally at Columbus Circle in New York City, despite protection by police and his own bodyguards. His assailant, Jerome A. Johnson, had gotten within close range of Colombo while wearing a press pass that he had picked up from IACRL officials. At 11:45 in the morning, Colombo was asked to pose for a photo with a bystander, and was shot twice by Johnson. Moments later, Johnson was shot to death, apparently by one of Colombo's bodyguards. Colombo survived after five hours of surgery, but suffered brain damage and would be paralyzed for the rest of his life.
- By a vote of 8 to 0, the U.S. Supreme Court unanimously reversed the conviction of heavyweight boxer Muhammad Ali, four years after he had been found guilty of refusing induction into the U.S. Army, and after Ali's world championships had been revoked by boxing commissions. The Court concluded that Ali had been improperly drafted despite his claim to be a conscientious objector to military service based on his religious faith as a Muslim.
- Born:
  - Fabien Barthez, French racing driver and former professional footballer, in Lavelanet
  - Kenny Cunningham, Irish sports commentator and former professional footballer, in Dublin
  - Elon Musk, South African-Canadian-American technology entrepreneur, founder of SpaceX and CEO of Tesla, in Johannesburg, South Africa
  - Aileen Quinn, American actress, in Yardley, Pennsylvania
- Died: Camille Clifford, 85, Belgian actress and model

== June 29, 1971 (Tuesday) ==
- U. S. Senator Mike Gravel attempted to read the Pentagon Papers into the Congressional Record, but was unable to do so because a quorum of at least 51 U.S. Senators was not available and the session was forced to adjourn. As an alternative, Senator Gravel went to a hearing room in the new Senate Office Building. In his capacity as Chairman of the U.S. Senate Subcommittee on Public Buildings and Grounds, Gravel found a quorum of members and then began reading the documents for three hours before adjourning.

== June 30, 1971 (Wednesday) ==
- After a successful mission aboard Salyut 1, the world's first crewed space station, the crew of the Soyuz 11 spacecraft were killed during their return to Earth after 24 days on the orbiting station. When the recovery team reached the capsule after its landing, they opened the hatch and found all three cosmonauts dead — Colonel Georgi T. Dobrovolsky and engineers Vladislav N. Volkov and Viktor I. Patsayev. An investigation later determined that a faulty valve within the Soyuz capsule had caused the oxygen within the capsule to slowly leak out as the craft was descending to Earth. More than two years after the accident, the Soviet Union provided full details to the U.S. in advance of the 1975 Apollo-Soyuz mission. The shock of firing 12 explosive bolts to separate the re-entry capsule from the orbiter had forced the exhaust valve open and loosened a valve cap that had acted as a safety device. While the cosmonauts realized that the valve was emptying the cabin's oxygen into space, the cabin pressure fell within 10 seconds while they were trying to assess the problem, and the capsule was completely empty of air 45 seconds after they were unconscious.
- In New York Times Co. v. United States, the U.S. Supreme Court ruled, 6 to 3, that the Pentagon Papers could be published, rejecting government injunctions as unconstitutional prior restraint. The Times resumed publication of the documents the next day.
- The U.S. State of Ohio approved ratification of the Twenty-sixth Amendment to the United States Constitution by a vote of 81 to 9 in the state House of Representatives, one day after the state Senate had voted 30 to 2 in favor of approval. In so doing, Ohio became the 38th of the 50 U.S. states to ratify the amendment to lower the minimum voting age nationwide from 21 years old to 18 years old, providing the necessary three-quarters majority necessary for the Twenty-Sixth Amendment to become law.
- The musical fantasy film Willy Wonka & the Chocolate Factory, based on the novel Charlie & the Chocolate Factory and starring Gene Wilder and Jack Albertson, was released.
- Died: Nikola Kotkov, 32, and Georgi Asparuhov, (28), Bulgarian footballers, were killed in a car accident
