= Nussbaum =

Nussbaum is a surname of German origin. Variant spellings include Nußbaum and Nusbaum. The word means "one who dwells near trees", likely referring to hazelnut trees or walnut trees.

== People surnamed Nussbaum ==
- A. Edward Nussbaum (1925–2009), theoretical mathematician
- Adam Nussbaum (born 1955), American jazz drummer
- Alan Nussbaum (born 1947), American linguist
- Albert Frederick Nussbaum (1934–1996), bank robber and novelist
- Alex Nussbaum, comedian, actor and writer
- Arthur Nussbaum (1877–1964), German legal scholar
- Barry D. Nussbaum, American statistician
- Bernard Nussbaum (1937–2022), former White House Counsel under Bill Clinton
- Emily Nussbaum (born 1966), American television critic
- Eugenie Nussbaum (1872–1940), Galician-Austrian philanthropist, writer and pedagogue developing and supporting Austrian girl education
- Felicity Nussbaum (born 1944), American professor of English
- Felix Nussbaum (1904–1944), a Jewish German painter
- Hedda Nussbaum (born 1942), American author of a memoir, Surviving Intimate Terrorism
- Howard Nusbaum (born 1954), American psychologist
- Joe Nussbaum (born 1973), American film director
- Johann Nepomuk von Nussbaum (1829–1890), German surgeon
- Laureen Nussbaum (born 1927), German-born American scholar and writer
- Lowell Nussbaum (1901–1987), journalist
- Martha Nussbaum (born 1947), American philosopher
- Mike Nussbaum (1923–2023), American actor and director
- Myer Nussbaum (1855–1952), New York lawyer and politician
- Paul Joseph Nussbaum (1870–1935), American prelate of the Roman Catholic Church
- Roger Nussbaum, American mathematician
- Ronald Archie Nussbaum, American herpetologist
- Theo Nussbaum (1885–1956), German architect
- Tsvi C. Nussbaum (1935–2012), Holocaust survivor
- Verena Nussbaum (born 1970), Austrian politician

== See also ==
- Nußbaum, a village in the Bad Kreuznach district in the Rhineland-Palatinate, Germany
- Nußbaum, a constituent community of the municipality of Neulingen in Baden-Württemberg, Germany
- Nusbaum is a municipality in the district Bitburg-Prüm in Rhineland-Palatinate, Germany
