= Peace Candle of the World =

Monument in Scappoose, Oregon, US

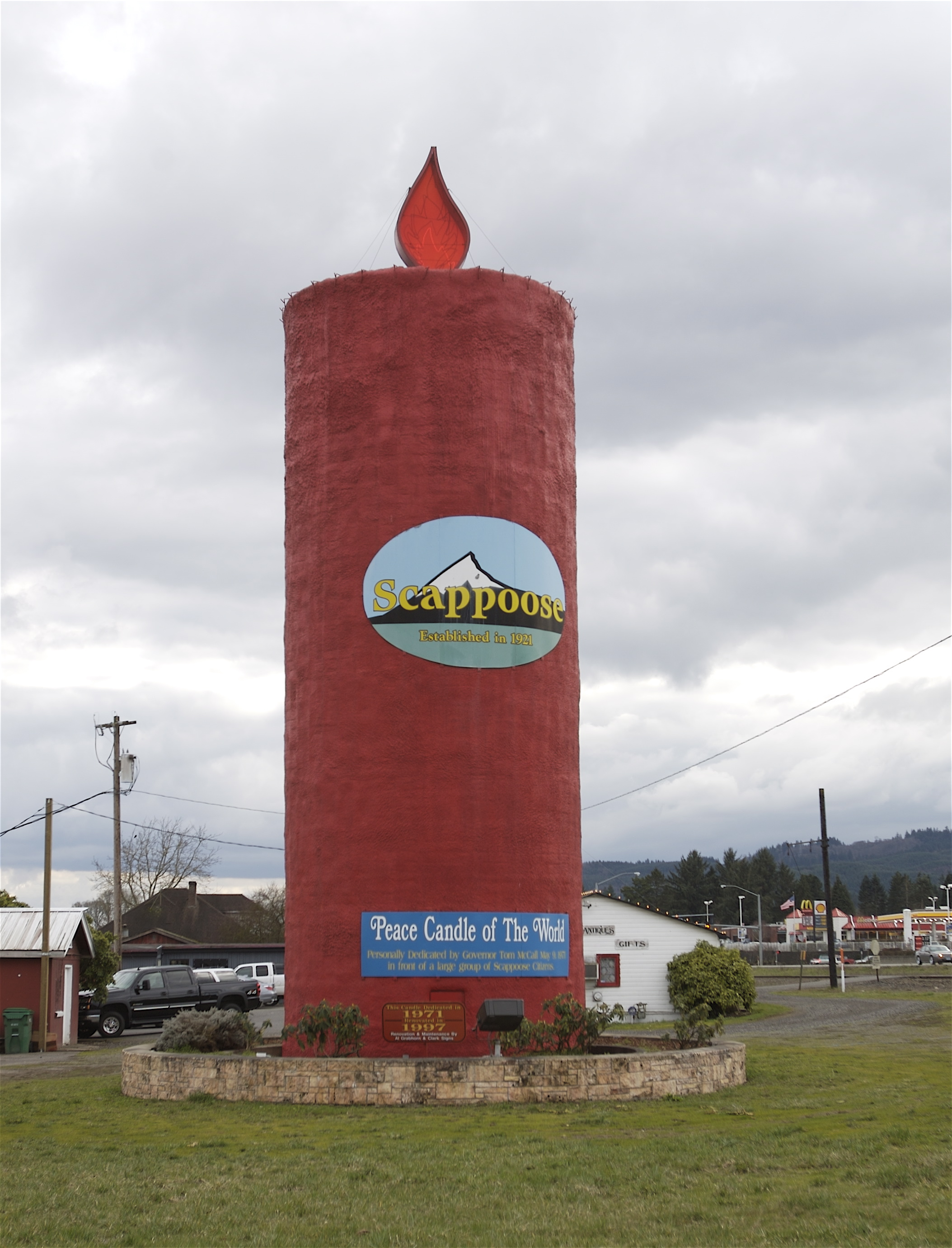
- The Peace Candle of the World in Scappoose, Oregon, in February 2008
- Interactive map of Peace Candle of the World
- Location: Scappoose, Oregon
- Coordinates: 45°44′36″N 122°52′33″W
- Established: May 9, 1971

The Peace Candle of the World, also known as the Scappoose Peace Candle, is an approximately 50-foot-tall (15 m) tower-like structure 18 feet (5.5 m) in diameter in Scappoose, Oregon, designed to resemble a candle. It was built in 1971 outside what was then the Brock Candles Inc. factory, which burned down in 1990. The land was formerly a dairy farm; factory owner Darrel Brock created the candle by covering a silo with 45,000 pounds (20 t) of red candle wax to advertise the factory.

The candle was originally built with an actual wick. On May 9, 1971, the town's mayor and Oregon Governor Tom McCall lit the candle with a specially-made 60-foot-long match. President Richard Nixon declined a request to light the candle. Due to difficulties in keeping the candle lit during rainfall, the wick was replaced with a natural gas line up the center of the candle to create a real flame at the top. However, due to environmental concerns and high gas bills, the flame was eventually replaced with an electric neon light flame structure.

The Peace Candle of the World was awarded the Guinness World Record for world's largest candle, but the record was later given to the 127-foot (39 m) wax candle that was featured at the General Art and Industrial Exhibition of Stockholm in 1897. The Scappoose Peace Candle sits on the east side of U.S. Route 30 and is visible from the highway. Each season the candle was re-coated with different colors to match the time of year, with red for Christmas and multiple colors being used in the fall. The wax around the candle was eventually replaced with more durable wax-like substances.

The candle is meant to serve as a symbol for the desire for world peace. During the Christmas season the Scappoose Peace Candle is strewn with strands of Christmas lights. The Scappoose region around the Peace Candle of the World has become more and more developed in recent years, and local residents fear that the candle could be demolished for redevelopment.

In June 2015 the Weather Channel website selected the Peace Candle of the World as the Oregon selection for its "Most Incredible Roadside Attraction in Every State" list.
