= List of mines in Mexico =

This list of mines in Mexico is subsidiary to the list of mines article and lists working, defunct and future mines in the country and is organised by the primary mineral output. For practical purposes stone, marble and other quarries may be included in this list.

== Baryte ==
- La Revancha mine

== Coal ==
- Cloete

== Copper ==
- Buenavista mine
- El Arco mine
- El Pilar mine
- La Caridad Mine

== Gold ==
- Camino Rojo mine
- Cerro de San Pedro
- Los Filos mine
- Morelos mine
- Naranjal mine
- Ojuela
- Peñasquito Polymetallic Mine

== Manganese ==
- Molango mine

== Molybdenum ==
- El Creston mine

== Silver ==
- Camino Rojo mine
- La Colorada mine
