= Chungar =

Chungar may refer to:

- Chungar Lake or Chungará Lake, a lake in the Lauca National Park, Chile
- Chungar Mine (11°07′27″S 76°31′56″W) in Peru. Its camp was destroyed and part of the underground workings flooded by a landslide into/tsunami from Yanawayin Lake in March 1971
- Eslām Chūngar, a town in Northern Afghanistan
