= Pan American Silver =

Canadian mining company

Pan American Silver Corporation
- Type: Public
- Traded as: TSX: PAAS; NYSE: PAAS
- Industry: Metals
- Founded: 1994
- Headquarters: Vancouver, Canada
- Key people: Michael Steinmann, CEO
- Revenue: US$1,631 million (2021)
- Number of employees: 7,300
- Website: panamericansilver.com

Pan American Silver Corporation is a mining company based in Canada with operations in Latin America. The company has mines and other projects in Mexico, Peru, Bolivia, and Argentina.

It is one of the world's biggest silver producers; in 2017 the company extracted 25 million ounces of Silver, 160,000 ounces of Gold, 55,300 ounces of Zinc, 21,500 tonnes of Lead, and 13,400 tonnes of Copper.

== History ==
Pan American Silver was founded in April 1994 by Ross Beaty. Beaty had previously founded and run Equinox Resources, which he eventually sold to an American mining company. It listed on NASDAQ in 1995 and acquired its Quiruvilca mine in the same year. In 1998, it acquired the La Colorada Mine in Mexico, and in 2000 it acquired the Huaron mine in Peru.

In 2012, Pan American acquired Minefinders Corporation for C$1.5 billion; Minefinders principal asset was the Dolores Mine in Mexico. In 2018, it temporarily curtailed operations at its Dolores mine in Mexico, due to violence in the area.

In 2020, research carried out by EJAtlas, MiningWatch Canada, Earthworks and the Institute for Policy Studies found that Pan-American Silver was involved in several environmental conflicts in Latin America and that these conflicts "demonstrate a lack of respect for communities defending their territories from mining."

=== Tahoe resources acquisition ===
In November 2018, Pan American announced it would acquire Tahoe Resources, a Nevada-based mining firm with mines in Latin America and Canada, for $1.1 billion or about $5 a share. Tahoe's largest asset was its shuttered Escobal Silver Mine in Guatemala, which faced widespread protests and had significant human rights violations where security guards shot locals, leading to a high profile court case. Markets reacted to the news, with Pan American's share price falling 12% whereas Tahoe's rose 50%. As of 2025, Pan American's Escobal silver mine remains suspended amid ongoing Indigenous consultation as mandated by Guatemala's Supreme Court. The impending result could set a precedent for Indigenous rights across Latin America.

== Operations ==
As of February 2025, Pan American has 12 operating mines:

- Cerro Moro mine in Santa Cruz, Argentina
- La Colorada Mine in Zacatecas, Mexico, with 2017 production of 7.1 MOz of Silver
- La Colorada Skarn in Zacatecas, Mexico
- Dolores Mine in Chihuahua, Mexico, with 2017 production of 4.2 MOz of Silver
- Huarón Mine in Pasco Region, Peru, with 2017 production of 3.7 MOz of Silver
- Jacobina mine in Bahia, Brazil
- Minera Florida mine in Santiago Metropolitan Region, Chile
- Navidad mine in Chubut Province, Argentina
- El Peñón mine in Antofagasta Region, Chile
- San Vincente Mine in Potosí Department, Bolivia, with 2017 production of 3.6 MOz of Silver
- Shahuindo in Department of Cajamarca, Peru
- Timmins mine in Timmins, Ontario
