= Huarón Mining District =

Polymetallic deposit cluster

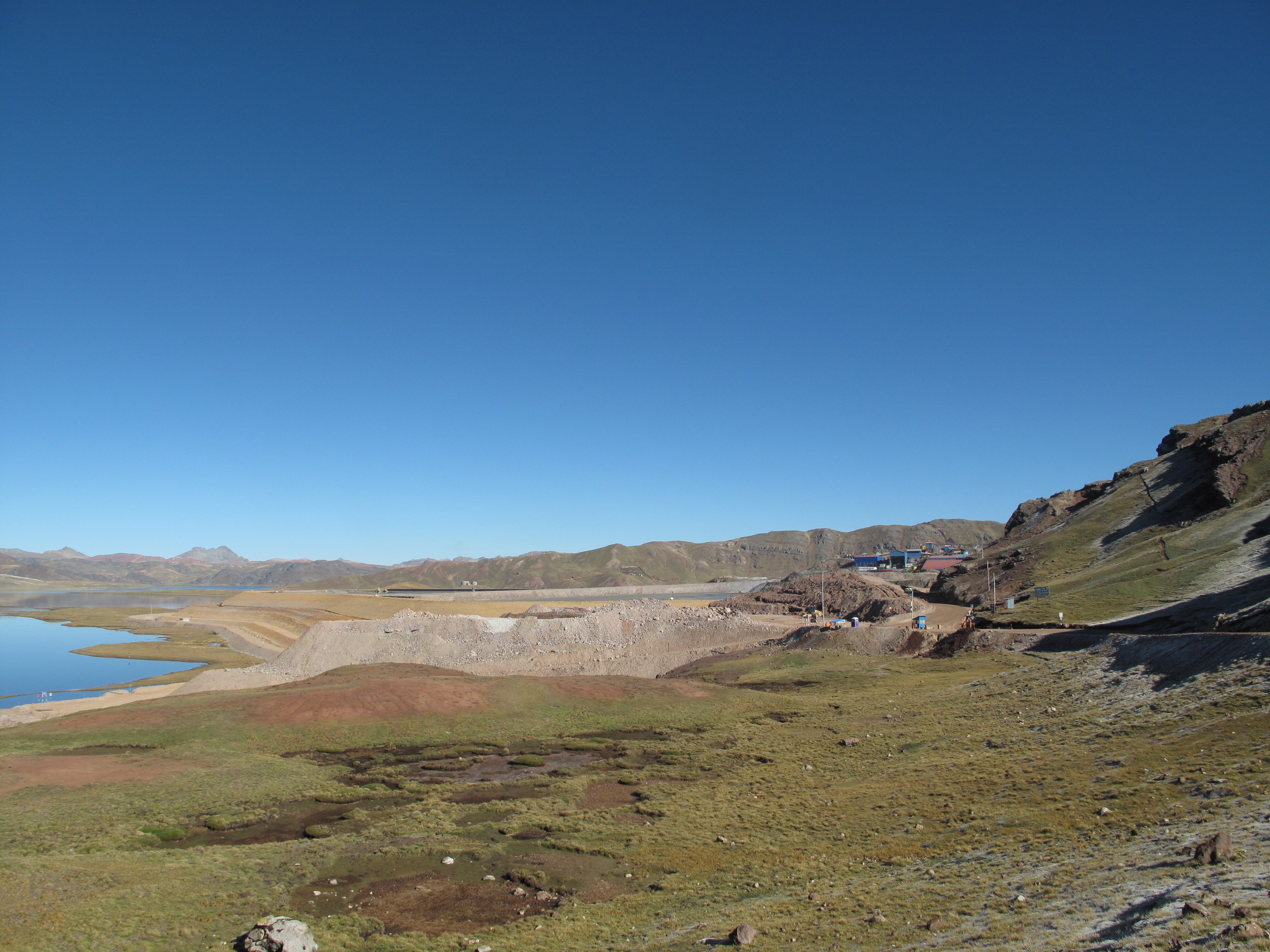
Animón mine camp (right) and talings pond (middle)

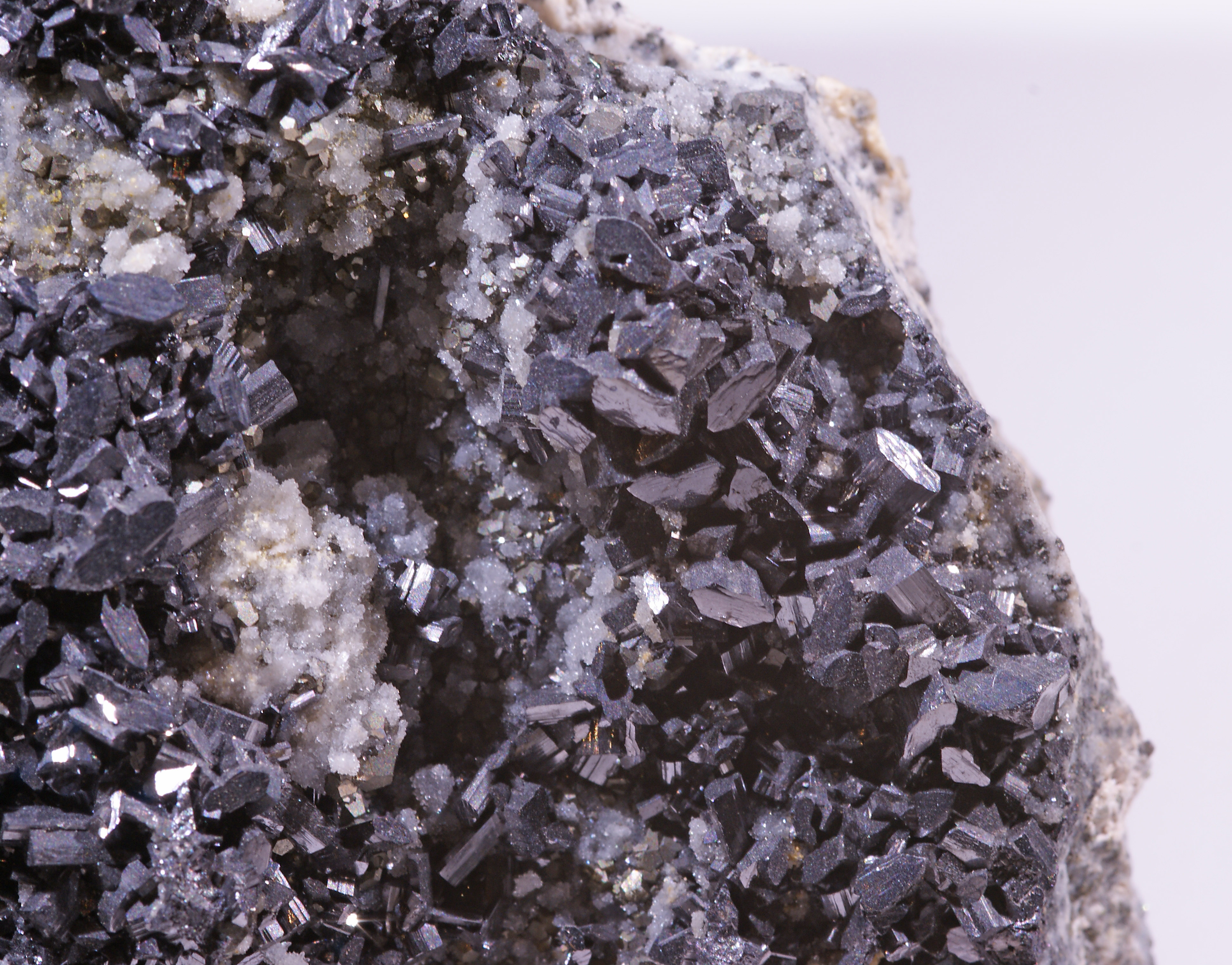
Enargite, quartz and minor pyrite of the high sulfidation core of the Huarón deposit

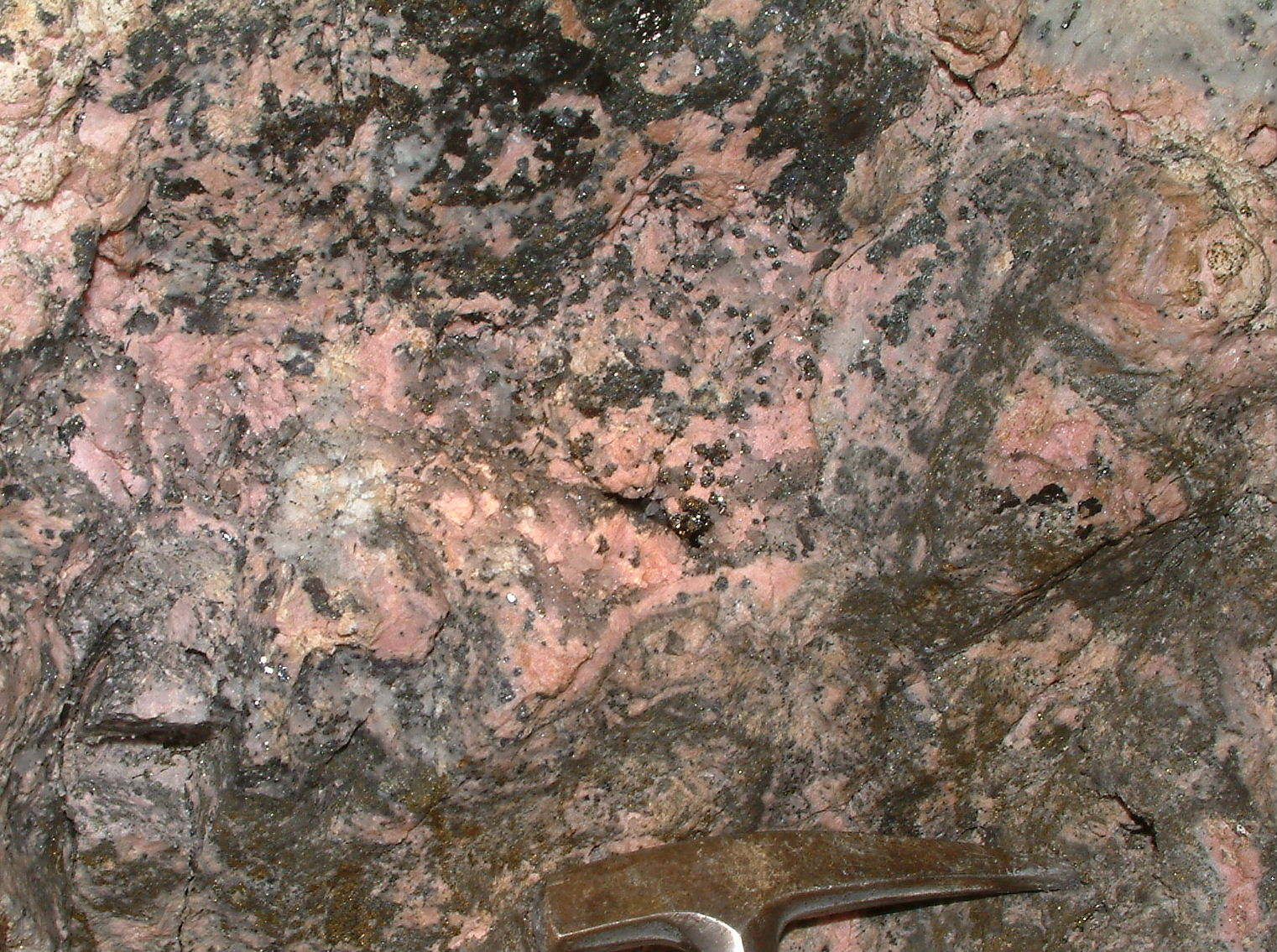
Typical intermediate sulfidation mineral assemblage of a vein in the Huarón mine. Sphalerite and tetrahedrite-tennantite (dark grey), rhodocrosite (orange), proustite (small deep red dots).

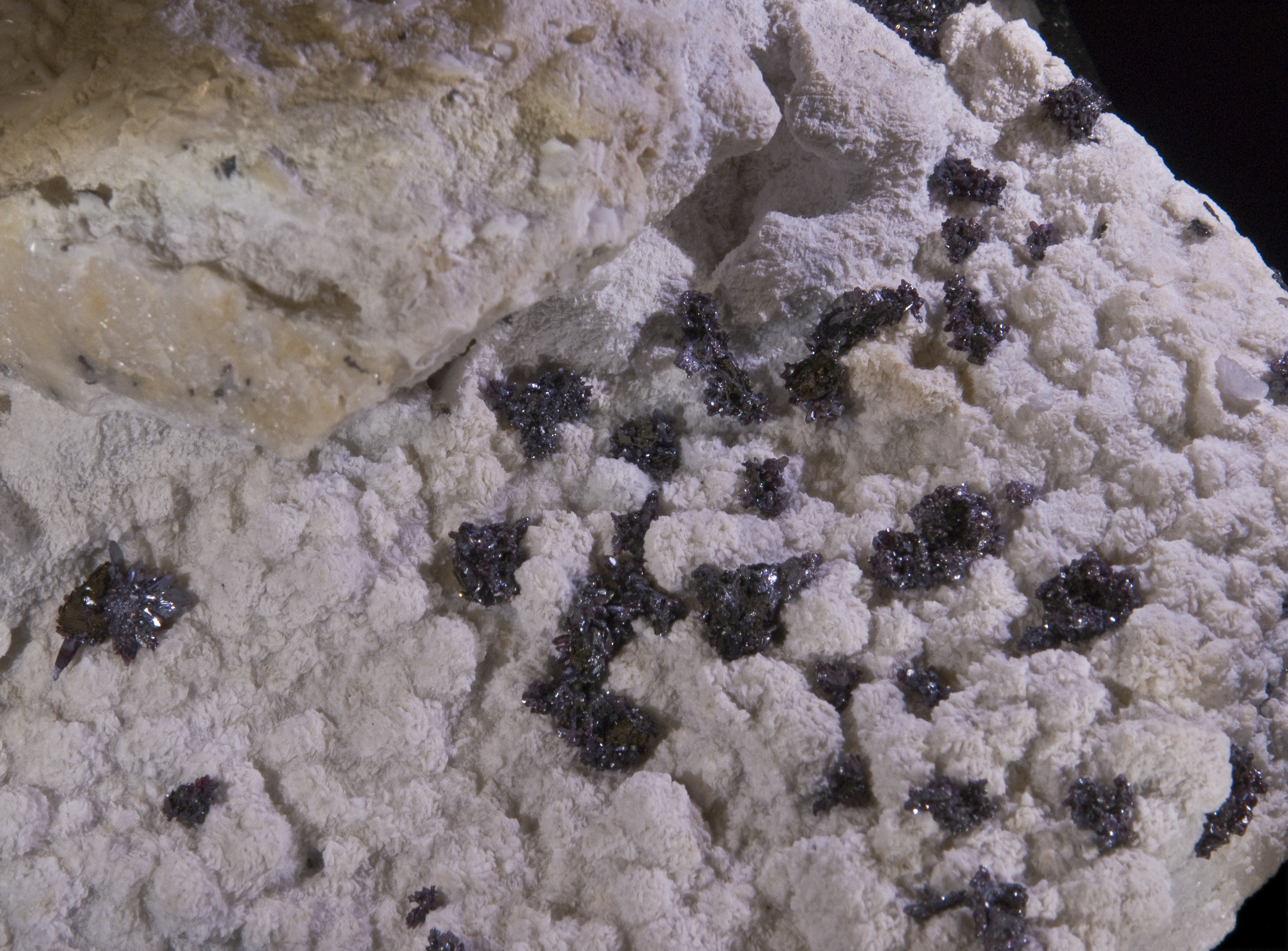
Pyrargyrite on carbonate mineral, Huarón mine

The Huarón Mining District is one of the richest polymetallic (Zn-Pb-Ag-Cu-(Au)) deposit clusters in Peru. It is located 20 km SSW of Cerro de Pasco, in the Huayllay District, Pasco Province, Pasco Department, between 4500 and 4700 m.a.s.l. The Huarón Mining District belongs to the Miocene polymetallic belt of the Central Andes. Hydrothermal mineralization occurs as predominantly in N-S to NNW-SSW and E-W veins as well as in "mantos" replacing favorable sedimentary rock. Epithermal hydrothermal fluids are thought to be derived from quartz-monzonitic intrusions tentatively dated at 7.4 Ma (K-Ar on adularia). The most important economic minerals are tennantite‐tetrahedrite (containing most of the silver), sphalerite, galena, and chalcopyrite. Silver is also found in pyrargyrite, proustite, polybasite, and pearceite. In the central copper core of the Huarón deposit, enargite occurs. Main gangue minerals are pyrite, quartz, rhodochrosite, and calcite.

== Operating mines in the Huarón Mining District ==
The following three mines operate presently in the Huarón Mining District:

- The Huarón mine (11°00′19″S 76°24′52″W, 4530 m.a.s.l.) operated by Pan American Silver. Flottation plant capacity is 2400 t/d.
- The Animón mine, located three km SSW of the Huarón mine (11°01′56″S 76°25′24″W, 4500 m.a.s.l.) (not to be confused with the inactive Chungar Mine, located 16 km to the SW, see below), operated by the mining company Volcan. In 2005, production was of about 4000 t per day, the flotation plant has a capacity of 5500 t per day and processes also the ore of the Islay Mine.
- The Islay mine, located 6 km W of the Huarón mine (11°00′36″S 76°28′08″W, 4500 m.a.s.l.) also operated by the mining company Volcan. In 2005 production was of about 1800 t per day.

=== Nomenclature confusion ===
The mining company Volcan operates the Animón and Islay mines through its subsidiary Compañía Minera Chungar S.A.C. and uses the term "Mining Unit Chungar" ("Unidad minera Chungar") for the operation dealing with both mines, Islay and Animón. The use by Volcan of this term "Chungar Mining Unit" has caused some confusion, and certain sources (e.g., the data base "alicia.concytec.gob.pe", google maps, WoodMackenzie Report) use wrongly the term of "Chungar mine" for the Animón mine. The actual Chungar Mine (inactive) is located 16 km to the SW.

== History of the Huarón Mining District ==
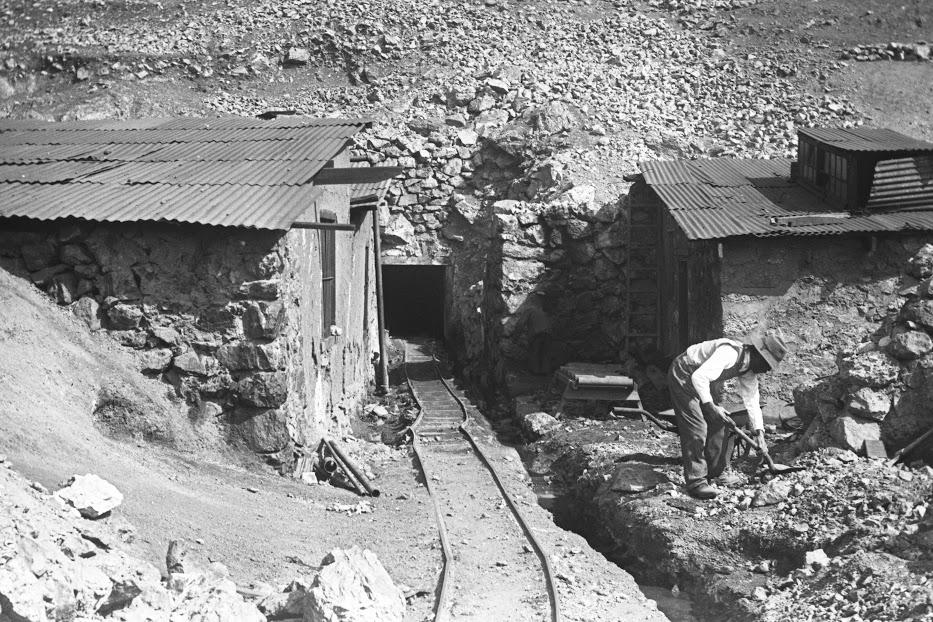
Entrance to the Huarón mine in 1913

Modern mining operations at the Huarón mine began in 1912 by Compagnie des Mines de Huarón, subsidiary of Sociedad Minera y Metalúrgica de Peñarroya. In 1987 the Huarón mine was acquired by the Hochschild Group, and in 2000 by Pan American Silver. On April 22, 1998, the Naticocha Lake flooded underground workings of the Animón Mine and of the Huarón mine killing several miners and causing the suspension of the mining operations at both mines. Pan American Silver acquired Huarón from Hochschild in 2000 and reopened the mine in 2001.

Modern activity in the Animón mine started in the 1960s on extensions of veins known in the Huarón mine. After the 1971 disaster at the Chungar Mine, Compañía Minera Chungar S.A.C. transferred its operations to Animón. In 2000, the mining company Volcan acquired Compañía Minera Chungar S.A.C. along with the Animón Mine. Subsequently Volcan opened the Islay mine.
