= Dolores mine =

Gold and silver mine in northern Mexico

- Location within Mexico
- Location: Chihuahua, Mexico; 28°59′21.8″N 108°32′10.3″W
- Products: Gold, Silver
- Production: 80,000 oz gold; and 4,000,000 oz silver per year.
- Opened: 2008
- Company: Pan American Silver

Dolores mine is an open pit and underground silver and gold mine, located in the municipality of Madera in the Tarahumara highlands in the Mexican state of Chihuahua. It is owned by the Canadian company Pan-American Silver (PAS). The mine began production in 2008 and was expected to produce over $3 billion in profits. In 2010 the mine was expected to produce 80,000 ounces of gold and 4,000,000 ounces of silver per year for 17 years. The area of the mine is 20,380 m².

The mine has generated environmental conflict, and local communities have fought for better environmental protection as well as larger shares of the profits from the mine. The conflict is exacerbated by militarization associated with the Mexican drug war. Arsenic leeching from the mine has contaminated local water supplies, and hundreds of families have been displaced.

== History ==
The mine was originally developed by Minefinders in 2008. Minefinders was a private Canadian silver and gold exploration company founded February 4, 1975, and were formerly known as Twentieth Century Explorations. They engaged in the acquisition, exploration, and development of precious metal properties and held controlling interest in said properties. The primary industry they operated in was multi-line mining, as well as precious metals and minerals mining.

Dolores mine is located in the state of Chihuahua, Mexico, in the Sierra Madre Occidental Range. Though the Minefinders Corporation started production in 2008, the mine was by no means newly discovered at that point, with the discovery of the Dolores site specifically dating back to 1860, and mining in the region dating back to earlier in the 1800s. Mechanized production of silver and gold has been documented from between 1915 and 1931 though stopped in 1931. In 1993, Minefinders started buying property in the region, and interest in mining in the range returned. The corporation acquired 27,700 ha of property and began a drilling program, leading to more than 200,000 m of combined core and reverse circulation drilling over the years with 850 drilled into the landscape.

The open-pit mine started production in November 2008 through Minefinders, and the mine began commercial production in May 2009. It was expected to produce 80,000 ounces of gold and 4 million ounces of silver per year during its estimated lifetime of over 17 years. Still under the oversight of Minefinders, the mine produced 1.22 million ounces of silver and 56,000 ounces of gold in 2010, with production increasing to 3.57 million ounces of silver and 74,400 ounces of gold in 2011.

In January 2012, PAS announced that they had agreed to acquire Minefinders for $1.5 Billion. Prior to this acquisition, PAS had already operated seven silver mines in Latin America and sought to specifically gain access to the Dolores mine through Minefinders. In the year before this acquisition the site had increased its silver production by almost 200 percent. The combined production for both companies in 2011 totaled about 26 million ounces of silver, and production was projected to rise to more than 50 million ounces by 2015.

PAS is a public Canadian mining company founded in 1994. They are primarily engaged in the operation, development, and exploration of silver and gold producing properties and assets. Their primary products are silver and gold, though they also produce and sell zinc, lead, and copper. PAS has operating mines in La Colorado, Dolores, Huaron, Morococha, Shahuindo, La Arena, Timmins West, Bell Creek, Manantial Espejo, and San Vicente mines.

With the acquisition of Minefinders and the Dolores Mine, PAS’s chief executive, Geoff Burns, said in 2012 that they “believe this acquisition is logical and consistent with PAS’s vision to become the largest, low-cost primary producer of silver in the world”. Prior to acquiring Minefinders, PAS had made a name buying ‘distressed’ mines and reviving them, compared to the decision to take over a company and mine that were already doing well.

The land that Dolores mine operates on originally belonged to the rural community Huizopa Ejido, a community of farmers in the municipality of Madera in the state of Chihuahua, Mexico. To obtain the mining concession titles for Dolores, Minefinders used their connection to Jose Liebano Saenz Ortiz, a member of the PRI political party and former private secretary to President Ernesto Zedillo. Saenz Ortiz held the original titles to the mining concessions for Dolores and then granted and sold them to Minefinders. In 2006, the Huizopa Ejido signed a contract with Minefinders, giving the company access to the community’s land for 16 years. The Ejido received 39 million pesos ($3.7 million). However, Minefinders had only obtained permission from Mexico’s Secretary of Environment and Natural Resources to operate on an area of 500 hectares, and illegally occupied 3,458 hectares for mineral extraction and exploration. The land-use contract between the company and the Huizopa Ejido only gave them permission to operate on a third of the land they operated on as well.

In 2008, the Ejido declared that the contract was fraudulent and that they had been deceived by the mining company. They demanded that the company take greater measures to mitigate environmental damage from the mine and equitably share the expected $3 billion in profits from the mine. Members of the community accused Saenz Ortiz of “robbing them of their rights, given that they had previously sought a relationship with him in order to seek the permits and capital necessary to explore and exploit minerals in the area themselves.”

== Militarization ==
The state of Chihuahua has been militarized by the Mexican drug war. When PAS bought the mine in 2012, there was an ongoing territorial dispute between organized crime groups. In Mexico, natural resource extractive industries may cooperate with organized crime groups who will drive away people living in areas to be mined and help the companies to silence community members who object to extractive projects. This violence also makes it difficult for human rights observers or journalists to travel to the area.

In 2020, research carried out by EJAtlas, MiningWatch Canada, Earthworks and the Institute for Policy Studies found that PAS was involved in several environmental conflicts in Latin America and that these conflicts "demonstrate a lack of respect for communities defending their territories from mining."

== Production and geology ==
Dolores mine is located in the Sierra Madre Occidental volcanic belt. The mine uses both open-pit and underground mining methods. The mineralized area is 4,000 meters long, 1,000 meters wide, 700 meters deep.

Dolores mine began production in 2008 with open-pit mining; underground mining techniques were explored beginning in 2010. Mine production was 1.22 million ounces of silver and 56,0000 ounces of gold in 2010, with production increasing in following years. From 2015-2018, the ore grade was 31-44 g/ton silver and 0.57-0.85 g/ton gold. The mine produced 4 million ounces of silver in 2018. In 2021, the mine had 20.5 M oz proven and probable silver reserves, and 650 k oz proven and probable gold reserves.

The mine primarily operates underground, with the maximum subsurface depth of the mine reaching 183 meters (600 feet). Along with the silver and gold ore that extracted from the mine, valuable minerals such as sphalerite, galena, and chalcopyrite. The associated rock in the area is diabase, which formed during the Upper Cretaceous epoch, approximately 100.5-66 million years ago. The mineralized area is 4,000 meters long, 1,000 meters wide, 700 meters deep.

The practices that the mining companies use include heap leaching with cyanide to extract the gold from the ore. Ore is trucked to leach pads where an arsenic leaching solution is run through it to extract the gold and silver.

== Conflict ==
In May 2018, armed criminal groups set up checkpoints around the mine, forcing the company to curtail operations. Contractors and security guards were threatened by criminal groups fighting for control of a drug trafficking route. Territorial control of the Dolores area by organized crime groups had been documented for years with high levels of violence in the Tarahumara highlands, though during the period in which PAS acquired Dolores, violence had worsened. This came as a result of a dispute between two cartels over the area, and the militarized response of the state came with serious repercussions for the Pima Indigenous peoples and rural communities who defended land and territory in the area.

=== Community impact ===
Minefinders destroyed a majority of the homes in the town in order to dynamite the area so that they could operate, affecting more than 60 families and forcing the historic town of Delores to relocate. Following the start of production at Dolores in 2008, the Permanent Assembly of the Community of Huizopa sought better conditions in its relationship with the company. However, Minefinders expressed disinterest in negotiating with them, prompting the Assembly to undertake a peaceful protest to blockade the mine. The community blockaded the mine for 17 months beginning in May 2008, demanding that measures be taken to ensure better environmental protection for the surrounding land and communities, given the dangers that the company’s practices impose.

At the barricades, people working for the mining company were prevented from passing, but soldiers were allowed through the barricades. Minefinders took advantage of this and were still able to access the mine by passing through the blockade by utilizing armed military guards. Guards travelled around in company trucks, dressed like civilians, and monitored the blockade. The blockade continued until the Mexican military facilitated access to the mine for the developer.

In May 2008, two community members involved in the blockade were detained for numerous hours by the state and federal police, acting on behalf of Minefinders. In August 2008, Professor Dante Valdez, one of the community leaders who had complained publicly about Minefinders, was beaten in front of the class he was teaching by some 30 unidentified men, some of whom were armed. Following this incident, Amnesty International issued a statement that some of the people involved in this beating were employed by Minefinders.

After the mine went into operation, community leaders reported that another 100 families of Pima indigenous people were forcibly displaced as a result of contamination from the mine, as well as a change in the course of the Tutuaca River, which affected the source of water that was used to sustain their other economic activities. The community’s complaints to environmental and human rights authorities went without response. In July 2010, complaints arose about a sodium cyanide spill from the mine’s leaching pad. The Federal Prosecutor for Environmental Protection confirmed and accepted the presence of cyanide in the soil yet stated that there was no environmental damage. In PAS’s own filings, however, they acknowledged that a tear had developed in the liner in one of the leaching pads in June 2010. Following this contamination from the mine, fish and animals began dying, raising further concerns about health problems in the community.
