= Smackover Formation =

Geological formation in southeastern U.S.

- Stratigraphic range: Oxfordian
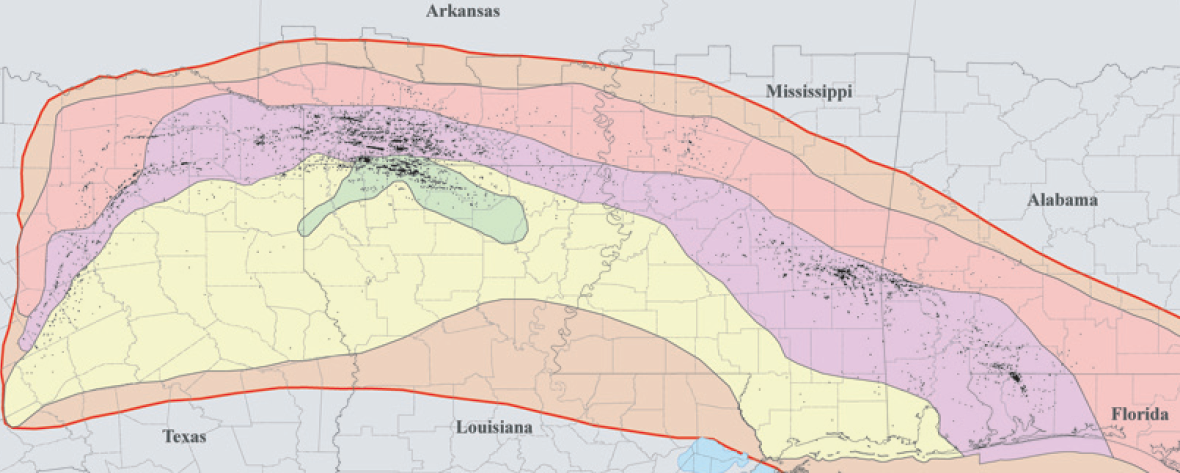
- Wells reporting Smackover Formation tops are indicated by black points and extend from Texas to Florida. Formation top depths measured in 6,764 wells range from 1,394 to 23,554 feet.
- Type: Formation
- Underlies: Buckner Formation
- Overlies: Norphlet Formation

Location
- Region: Arkansas, Louisiana, Texas, Alabama, Mississippi, and Florida
- Country: United States

The Smackover Formation is a geologic formation that extends under portions of Arkansas, Louisiana, Texas, Alabama, Mississippi, and Florida. It preserves fossils dating back to the Jurassic period. The formation is a relic of a former ancient sea that left an extensive, porous, and permeable limestone geologic unit.

The Smackover Formation consists of oolitic limestones and silty limestones.

== Mineral resources ==
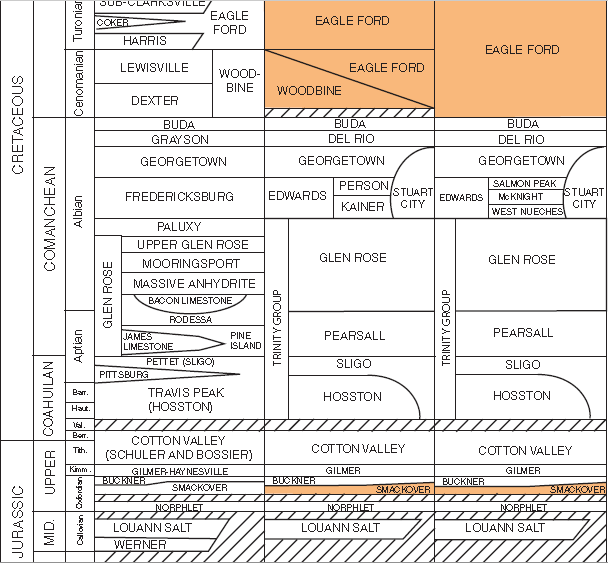
Smackover Formation stratigraphic column for Texas

The Smackover Formation has been a prolific source of petroleum since the 1920s. Since the 2000s, brine from the formation has been refined to extract bromine. In the 2020s, feasibility studies to extract commercial quantities of lithium are underway.

The 1922 discovery of the Smackover oil field, after which the Smackover Formation is named, resulted in a sizable oil boom in southern Arkansas.

In addition to being a petroleum reservoir, as of 2015, the brine from the Smackover Formation is the only source of commercial bromine in the United States.

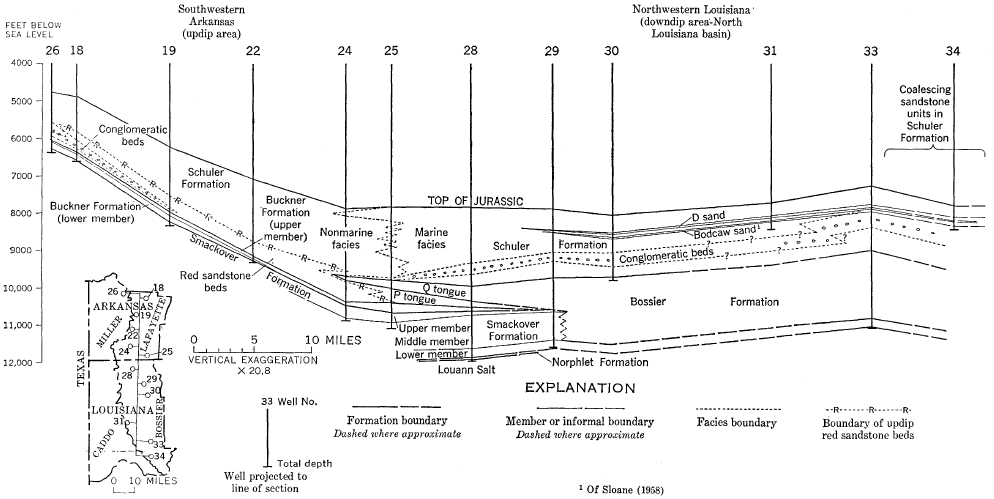
Smackover and Bossier Formations geologic cross section

A 2022 report estimated that the lithium brine in the formation has "sufficient lithium to produce enough batteries for 50 million electric vehicles". In October 2024, federal and state researchers announced the geologic formation may hold five to nineteen million tons of lithium, which is approximately nine times the projected annual worldwide 2030 demand for electric vehicles.

Results published in 2025 from multiple exploration wells in Lafayette County, Arkansas found an average lithium concentration of 582 mg/L (4,860 lb/million US gal) in the subsurface brine of the upper Smackover Formation including one exploration well with the highest lithium concentration reported to that date in the southwest Arkansas Smackover formation, 616 mg/L (5,140 lb/million US gal).

The South West Arkansas Project (SWA) to develop the large lithium brine resource in the Arkansas portion of the Smackover Formation received US Federal government designation as a "Priority Critical Mineral Project" on 21 April 2025. The Federal designation and the high quality resource samples exceeding 600 mg/L lithium concentration are considered to de-risk the project during the intensive capital raise to advance the project to operational lithium recovery. On 23 May 2026, SWA completed Federal permitting for an operational facility aiming to produce 22,500 tonnes of lithium carbonate annually, which would be a 4x increase in US domestic battery-grade lithium production. In 2025, the U.S. produced just 1% of the world's lithium.

== See also ==
- Brine mining
- Bromine production in the United States
- Lithium production
- List of fossiliferous stratigraphic units in Arkansas
- Paleontology in Arkansas
- Smackover, Arkansas
