= Brine mining =

Extracting materials from saltwater

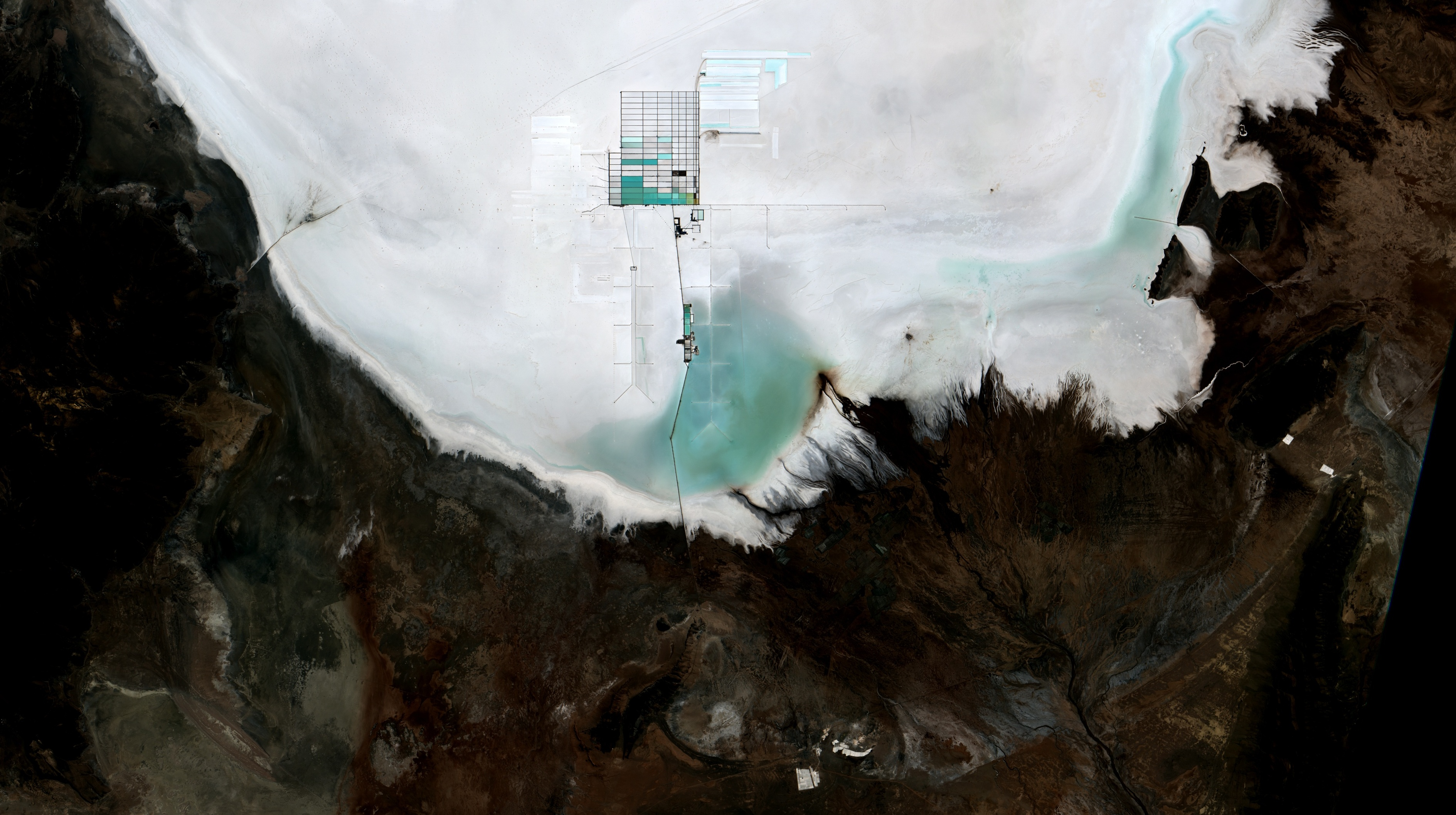
Satellite photo of a lithium mine at Bolivia's Salar de Uyuni, where lithium is extracted from brine in evaporation pools

Brine mining is the extraction of useful materials (chemical elements or compounds) which are naturally dissolved in brine. The brine may be seawater, other surface water, groundwater, or hyper-saline solutions from several industries (e.g., textile industries). It differs from solution mining or in-situ leaching in that those methods inject water or chemicals to dissolve materials which are in a solid state; in brine mining, the materials are already dissolved.

Brines are important sources of common salt (NaCl), calcium, iodine, lithium, magnesium, potassium, bromine, and other materials, and are potentially important sources of a number of others. Brine mining supports waste minimization and resource recovery efforts.

== History ==
Around 500 BC, the ancient Chinese dug hundreds of brine wells, some of which were over 100 meters (330 feet) in depth. Large brine deposits under the earth's surface were drilled by drilling boreholes. Bamboo towers were erected, similar in style to modern-day oil derricks. Bamboo was used for ropes, casing, and derricks since it was salt resistant. Iron wedges were hung from a bamboo cable tool attached to a lever on a platform constructed atop the tower. The derricks required two to three men jumping on and off the lever that moved the iron wedge pounded into the ground to dig a hole deep enough into the ground to hit the brine.

== Types of brines used for mineral extraction ==
Commercial brines include both surface water (seawater and saline lakes) and groundwater (shallow brine beneath saline or dry lakes, and deep brines in sedimentary basins). Brine brought to the surface by geothermal energy wells often contains high concentrations of minerals, but is not currently used for commercial mineral extraction.

=== Seawater ===
Seawater has been used as a source of sea salt since prehistoric times, and more recently of magnesium and bromine. Potassium is sometimes recovered from the bittern left after salt precipitation. The oceans are often described as an inexhaustible resource.

=== Saline lakes ===
There are many saline lakes with salinity greater than seawater, making them appealing for mineral extraction. Examples are the Dead Sea and the Great Salt Lake. In addition, some saline lakes, such as Lake Natron in East Africa, have chemistry very different than seawater, making them potential sources of sodium carbonate.

=== Shallow groundwater brines associated with saline or dry lakes ===
The groundwater beneath saline or dry lakes often has brines with chemistry similar to that of the lakes or former lakes.

The chemistry of shallow brines used for mineral extraction is sometimes influenced by geothermal waters. This is true of a number of shallow brines in the western United States, such as at Searles Lake, California.

=== Geothermal brines ===
Geothermal power plants often bring brine to the surface as part of the operation. This brine is usually re-injected into the ground, but some experiments have been made to extract minerals before re-injection. Brine brought to the surface by geothermal energy plants has been used in pilot plants as a source of colloidal silica (Wairakei, New Zealand, and Mammoth Lakes, California), and as a source of zinc (Salton Sea, California). Boron was recovered circa 1900 from geothermal steam at Larderello, Italy. Lithium recovery has also been investigated. But as of 2015, there is no sustained commercial-scale mineral recovery from geothermal brine.

=== Deep brines in sedimentary basins ===
The concentration of dissolved solids in deep connate water varies from much less than seawater to ten times the total dissolved solids of seawater. In general, total dissolved solids (TDS) concentrations increase with depth. Most deep groundwaters classified as brines (having total dissolved solids equal to or greater than that of seawater) are predominantly sodium chloride type. However, the predominance of chloride usually increases with increasing TDS, at the expense of sulfate. The ratio of calcium to sodium usually increases with depth.

The presence of groundwater with TDS higher than seawater is in some cases due to contact with salt beds. More often, however, the higher TDS of deep sediments is thought to be the result of the sediments acting as semi-permeable membranes. As the sediments compact under burial pressure, the dissolved species are less mobile than the water, resulting in higher TDS concentrations than seawater. Bivalent species such as calcium (Ca^{+2}) are less mobile than univalent species such as sodium (Na^{+}), resulting in calcium enrichment. The ratio of potassium to sodium (K/Na) may increase or decrease with depth, thought to be the result of ion exchange with the sediments.

=== Industrial brine ===
Several industries produce brines as by-products. Such industries are dairy, textile, leather, oil industries, etc. Thus, useful materials can be extracted and reused. However in industrial brine other chemicals and inhibitors might limit the ability to extract these useful materials.

== Materials recovered from brines ==
Many brines contain more than one recovered product. For instance, the shallow brine beneath Searles Lake, California, is or has been a source of borax, potash, bromine, lithium, phosphate, soda ash, and sodium sulfate.

=== Salt ===
Source	Salt concentration
Seawater	129,500 mg/L (129.5 g/L)

Salt (sodium chloride) has been a valuable commodity since prehistoric times, and its extraction from seawater also goes back to prehistory. Salt is extracted from seawater in many countries around the world, but the majority of salt put on the market today is mined from solid evaporite deposits.

Salt is produced as a byproduct of potash extraction from Dead Sea brine at one plant in Israel (Dead Sea Works), and another in Jordan (Arab Salt Works). The total salt precipitated in solar evaporation at the Dead Sea plants is tens of millions of tons annually, but very little of the salt is marketed.

Today, salt from groundwater brines is generally a byproduct of the process of extracting other dissolved substances from brines and constitutes only a small part of world salt production. In the United States, salt is recovered from surface brine at the Great Salt Lake, Utah, and from a shallow subsurface brine at Searles Lake, California.

=== Sodium sulfate ===
In 1997 about two-thirds of world sodium sulfate production was recovered from brine. Two plants in the US, at Searles Lake, California, and Seagraves, Texas, recovered sodium sulfate from shallow brines beneath dry lakes.

=== Soda ash ===
Soda ash (sodium carbonate) is recovered from shallow subsurface brines at Searles Lake, California. Soda ash was formerly extracted at El Caracol, Ecatepec, in Mexico City, from the remnant of Lake Texcoco.

=== Colloidal silica ===
Brines brought to the surface by geothermal energy production often contain concentrations of dissolved silica of about 500 parts per million. A number of geothermal plants have pilot-tested recovery of colloidal silica, including those at Wairakei, New Zealand, Mammoth Lakes, California, and the Salton Sea, California. To date, colloidal silica from brine has not achieved commercial production.

=== Potash ===
Location	Potassium concentration	Source
Ocean	380 mg/L (0.38 g/L)	Seawater
Ocean	17,700 mg/L (17.7 g/L)	Seawater, bittern remaining after salt precipitation
Salar de Olaroz mine, Argentina	5,730 mg/L (5.73 g/L)	Shallow brine beneath dry lake
Salar de Atacama, Chile	19,400 mg/L (19.4 g/L)	Shallow brine beneath dry lake
Da Chaidam Salt Lake, China	22,500 mg/L (22.5 g/L)	Saline lake
Dead Sea, Israel and Jordan	6,200 mg/L (6.2 g/L)	Saline lake

Potash is recovered from surface brine of the Dead Sea, at plants in Israel and Jordan. In 2013 Dead Sea brine provided 9.2% of the world production of potash. As of 1996, the Dead Sea was estimated to contain 2.05 million tons of potassium chloride, the largest brine reserve of potassium other than the ocean.

=== Lithium ===
Location	Lithium concentration	Source
Ocean	0.17 mg/L	Seawater
Clayton Valley, Nevada	300 mg/L (0.30 g/L)	Shallow brine beneath dry lake
Cornwall, United Kingdom	220 mg/L (0.22 g/L)	Geothermal waters
Paradox Basin, Utah	142 mg/L (0.142 g/L)	Brine at depth (Cane Creek well)
Salar de Olaroz mine, Argentina	690 mg/L (0.69 g/L)	Shallow brine beneath dry lake
Salton Sea, California	170 mg/L (0.17 g/L)	Geothermal brine

In 2015 subsurface brines yielded about half of the world's lithium production. Whereas seawater contains about 0.17 mg/L (0.00017 g/L), subsurface brines may contain up to 4,000 mg/L (4.0 g/L), more than four orders of magnitude greater than seawater. Typical commercial lithium concentrations are between 200 and 1,400 mg/L (1.4 g/L).

The largest operations are in the shallow brine beneath the Salar de Atacama dry lakebed in Chile, which as of 2015 yielded about a third of the world's supply. The brine operations are primarily for potassium; extraction of lithium as a byproduct began in 1997.

The shallow brine beneath the Salar de Uyuni in Bolivia is thought to contain the world's largest lithium resource, often estimated to be half or more of the world's resource. As of 2015, no commercial extraction has taken place, other than a pilot plant.

Commercial deposits of shallow lithium brines beneath dry lakebeds have the following characteristics in common:

- Arid climate
- Closed basin with a dry or seasonal lake
- Tectonically driven subsidence
- Igneous or geothermal activity
- Lithium-rich source rock
- Permeable aquifers
- Enough time to concentrate brine

In 2010 Simbol Materials received a $3 million grant from the U.S. Department of Energy for a pilot project aimed at showing the financial feasibility of extracting high-quality lithium from geothermal brine. It uses brine from the 49.9 megawatt Featherstone geothermal power plant in California's Imperial Valley. Simbol passes the plant's extracted fluid through a series of membranes, filters and adsorption materials to extract lithium.

In 2016, MGX Minerals developed a proprietary design process (U.S. Provisional Patent #62/419,011) to potentially recover lithium and other valuable minerals from highly mineralized oilfield brine. The company has acquired development rights to over approximately 1.7 million acres of brine-bearing formations in Canada and Utah. According to MGX, the Saskatchewan Research Council, an independent laboratory, verified the MGX Minerals petrolithium extraction technology in April 2017.

Lithium mining from geothermal boreholes is a groving project in Europe. Potential sites are Cornwall (UK), Rhine Graben (France, Germany) and Cesano (Italy). All these sites have a lithium concentration of 200 mg/L or higher. Origin is due to interaction with mica minerals in the granite and/or in the rocks of the local basement.

=== Boron ===
Location	Boron concentration	Source
Ocean	4.6 mg/L (0.0046 g/L)	Seawater
Salar de Olaroz, Argentina	1,050 mg/L (1.05 g/L)	Shallow brine beneath dry lake
Paradox Basin, Utah	829 mg/L (0.829 g/L)	Brine at depth (Cane Creek well)

Boron is recovered from shallow brines beneath Searles Lake, California, by Searles Valley Minerals. Although boron is the primary product, potassium and other salts are also recovered as byproducts.

The brine beneath the Salar de Olaroz, Argentina, is a commercial source of boron, lithium, and potassium.

Circa 1900, boron was recovered from geothermal steam at Larderello, Italy.

=== Iodine ===
Location	Iodine concentration	Source
Ocean	0.06 mg/L (6.0×10^{−5} g/L)	Seawater
Kanto Gas Field, Japan	160 mg/L (0.16 g/L)	Deep brine in sedimentary basin
Morrow Sandstone, Oklahoma, USA	300 mg/L (0.30 g/L)	Deep brine in sedimentary basin
Utah Paradox Basin	596 mg/L (0.596 g/L)	Brine at depth (Cane Creek well)

Brines are a major source of iodine supply worldwide. Major deposits occur in Japan and the United States. Iodine is recovered from deep brines pumped to the surface as a byproduct of oil and natural gas production. Seawater contains about 0.06 mg/L (6.0×10^{−5} g/L) iodine, while subsurface brines contain as much as 1,560 mg/L (1.56 g/L), more than five orders of magnitude greater than seawater. The source of the iodine is thought to be organic material in shales, which also form the source rock for the associated hydrocarbons.

==== Japan ====
By far the largest source of iodine from brine is Japan, where iodine-rich water is co-produced with natural gas. Iodine extraction began in 1934. In 2013 seven companies were reported to be extracting iodine. Japanese iodine brines are produced from mostly marine sediments ranging in age from Pliocene to Pleistocene. The main producing area is the Southern Kanto gas field on the east-central coast of Honshu. The iodine content of the brine can be as high as 160 ppm.

==== Anadarko Basin, Oklahoma ====
Since 1977, iodine has been extracted from brine in the Morrow Sandstone of Pennsylvanian age, at locations in the Anadarko Basin. of northwest Oklahoma. The brine occurs at depths of 6,000 to 10,000 feet, and contains about 300 ppm iodine.

=== Bromine ===
Location	Bromine concentration	Source
Ocean	65 mg/L (0.065 g/L)	Seawater
Ocean	2,970 mg/L (2.97 g/L)	Seawater, bittern remaining after salt precipitation
Smackover Formation, Arkansas, USA	5,000 to 6,000 mg/L (5.0 to 6.0 g/L)	Deep brine in sedimentary basin
Dead Sea, Israel and Jordan	10,000 mg/L (10 g/L)	Saline lake
Paradox Basin Utah	12,894 mg/L (12.894 g/L)	Brine at Depth, (Cane Creek well)

All the world's bromine production is derived from brine. The majority is recovered from Dead Sea brine at plants in Israel and Jordan, where bromine is a byproduct of potash recovery. Plants in the United States (see: Bromine production in the United States), China, Turkmenistan, and Ukraine, recover bromine from subsurface brines. In India and Japan, bromine is recovered as a byproduct of sea salt production.

=== Magnesium and magnesium compounds ===
Location	Magnesium concentration	Source
Ocean	1,350 mg/L (1.35 g/L)	Seawater
Ocean	56,100 mg/L (56.1 g/L)	Seawater, bittern remaining after salt precipitation
Dead Sea, Israel and Jordan	35,200 mg/L (35.2 g/L)	Saline lake
Paradox Basin, Utah	42,995 mg/L (42.995 g/L)	Brine at depth (Cane Creek well)

The first commercial production of magnesium from seawater was recorded in 1923, when some solar salt plants around San Francisco Bay, California, extracted magnesium from the bitterns left after salt precipitation.

The Dow Chemical Company began producing magnesium on a small scale in 1916, from deep subsurface brine in the Michigan Basin. In 1933, Dow began using an ion exchange process to concentrate the magnesium in its brine. In 1941, prompted by the need for magnesium for aircraft during World War II, Dow started a large plant at Freeport, Texas, to extract magnesium from the sea. A number of other plants to extract magnesium from brine were built in the US, including one near the Freeport plant at Velasco. At the end of World War II, all shut down except the plant at Freeport, Texas, although the Velasco plant was reactivated during the Korean War. The magnesium plant at Freeport operated until 1998, when Dow announced that it would not rebuild the unit following hurricane damage.

Because metallic magnesium is extracted from brine by an electrolytic process, the economics are sensitive to the cost of electricity. Dow had located their facility on the Texas coast to take advantage of cheap natural gas for electrical generation. In 1951, Norsk Hydro started a magnesium-from-seawater plant at Heroya, Norway, supplied by inexpensive hydroelectricity. The two seawater magnesium plants, in Texas and Norway, provided more than half the world's primary magnesium through the 1950s and 1960s.

As of 2014, the only producer of primary magnesium metal in the United States was U.S. Magnesium LLC, which extracted the metal from surface brine of the Great Salt Lake, at its plant in Rowley, Utah.

The Dead Sea Works in Israel produces magnesium as a byproduct of potash extraction.

=== Zinc ===
Location	Zinc concentration	Source
Ocean	0.01 mg/L (1.0×10^{−5} g/L)	Seawater
Salton Sea, California	270 mg/L (0.27 g/L)	Geothermal brine

Starting in 2002, CalEnergy extracted zinc from brines at its geothermal energy plants at the Salton Sea, California. At full production, the company hoped to produce 30,000 metric tons of 99.99% pure zinc per year, yielding about as much profit as the company made from geothermal energy. But the zinc recovery unit did not perform as anticipated, and zinc recovery halted in 2004.

=== Tungsten ===
Location	Tungsten concentration	Source
Ocean	0.0001 mg/L (1.0×10^{−7} g/L)	Seawater
Searles Lake, California	56 mg/L (0.056 g/L)	Shallow brine beneath dry lake

Some near-surface brines in the western United States contain anomalously high concentrations of dissolved tungsten. Should recovery ever prove economic, some brines could be significant sources of tungsten. For instance, brines beneath Searles Lake, California, with concentrations of about 56 mg/L (0.056 g/L) tungsten (70 mg/L (0.070 g/L) WO_{3}), contain about 8.5 million short tons of tungsten. Although 90% of the dissolved tungsten is technically recoverable by ion exchange resins, recovery is uneconomic.

=== Uranium ===
Source	Uranium concentration
Seawater	0.003 mg/L (3.0×10^{−6} g/L)

In 2012 research for the US Department of Energy, building on Japanese research from the 1990s, tested a method for extracting uranium from seawater, which, they concluded, could extract uranium at a cost of US$660/kg. While this was still five times the cost of uranium from ore, the amount of uranium dissolved in seawater would be enough to provide nuclear fuel for thousands of years at current rates of consumption. Bernard L. Cohen showed that all the world's energy requirements for 5 billion years could be provided by breeder reactors fueled by uranium extracted from seawater without the cost of electricity rising by as much as 1% due to fuel costs. (Considering that rivers refill the oceans continuously and extraction would slightly lower the concentration and thus the rate lost to deposits)

=== Gold ===
Source	Gold concentration
Seawater	0.000004 mg/L (4.0×10^{−9} g/L)

Attempts to extract gold from seawater were common in the early 20th century. A number of people claimed to be able to economically recover gold from seawater, but they were all either mistaken or acted in an intentional deception. Prescott Jernegan ran a gold-from-seawater swindle in the United States in the 1890s. A British fraudster ran the same scam in England in the early 1900s.

Fritz Haber (the German inventor of the Haber process) did research on the extraction of gold from seawater in an effort to help pay Germany's reparations following World War I. Based on published values of 2 to 64 ppb of gold in seawater, a commercially successful extraction seemed possible. After analysis of 4,000 water samples yielding an average of 0.004 ppb, it became clear to Haber that the extraction would not be possible, and he stopped the project.
