= Mining in Argentina =

Mining in Argentina extracts primary aluminum, lead, copper, zinc, silver, and gold. In 2019, Argentina was the 4th largest world producer of lithium, the 9th largest world producer of silver, the 17th largest world producer of gold and the 7th largest world producer of boron.

Argentina shares a lithium-rich area known as the Lithium Triangle with Bolivia and Chile, and El Indio Gold Belt with Chile.

The mining industry in Argentina is overseen by the Mining Department of the Ministry of Planning and Public Investment.

== Legislation ==
=== Argentine-Chilean Mining Integration and Complementation Treaty ===
The "Treaty on Mining Integration and Complementarity" (Tratado de integración y complementación minera entre Argentine y Chile) is an extension of the Treaty of Peace and Friendship of 1984 between Chile and Argentina, as Protocol No 3 of the Economic Complementation Agreement No 16. The governments of Argentina and Chile signed the Treaty in 1997, it establishes a single legal framework to facilitate the exploration, exploitation and development of mining projects which might straddle the international border between the two countries. The treaty is specifically relevant to a strip approximately 40km wide on both sides of the frontier. It came into force in 2000 and was aimed at promoting investment by facilitating logistics, personnel movement, and infrastructure sharing between the two countries. The treaty covers tax and customs matters, as well as environmental, labour, social security, health and investment protection issues.

It has a bearing on both mineral deposits which might straddle the international border and situations where a mining project located in one country requires its border facilities to cross to the other country in order to make the project economically feasible. Pascua Lama, Filo del Sol and the Los Azules mine are specific projects which have been influenced by the Treaty, but more than 20 border mining projects have been identified within the first 25 years of the treaty.

=== Glacier and Periglacial Environment Law 26,639 ===
The "Glacier Law" (Ley de Presupuestos Mínimos para la Preservación de los Glaciares y del Ambiente Periglacial) was first passed by the Argentina Congress in 2008 but the then president, Cristina Fernández de Kirchner, used her veto against its enactment. The law was reintroduced in 2010 and, because Argentinian law prevents a second presidential veto of the same law, it was enacted in 2010. The law was intended to protect glaciers and periglacial areas as strategic water reserves and it prohibited all mining and exploration activities in glacier regions. The law had been one of the factors which preventing the exploitation of the Pascua Lama deposit.

In 2026 the Argentina Congress passed an amendment which devolved, to provincial governments, the responsibility for defining protected glacier areas. This change will make it easier to gain approval for mining in glacier regions.

== Mines ==
- Los Azules mine (Copper)
- Manantial Espejo mine (Silver)
- Navidad mine (Silver)
- Pirquitas mine (Silver)
- Salar de Olaroz mine (Lithium)
- Salinas Grandes mine (Lithium)

== See also ==
- Pirquinero
