= Port of Chancay =

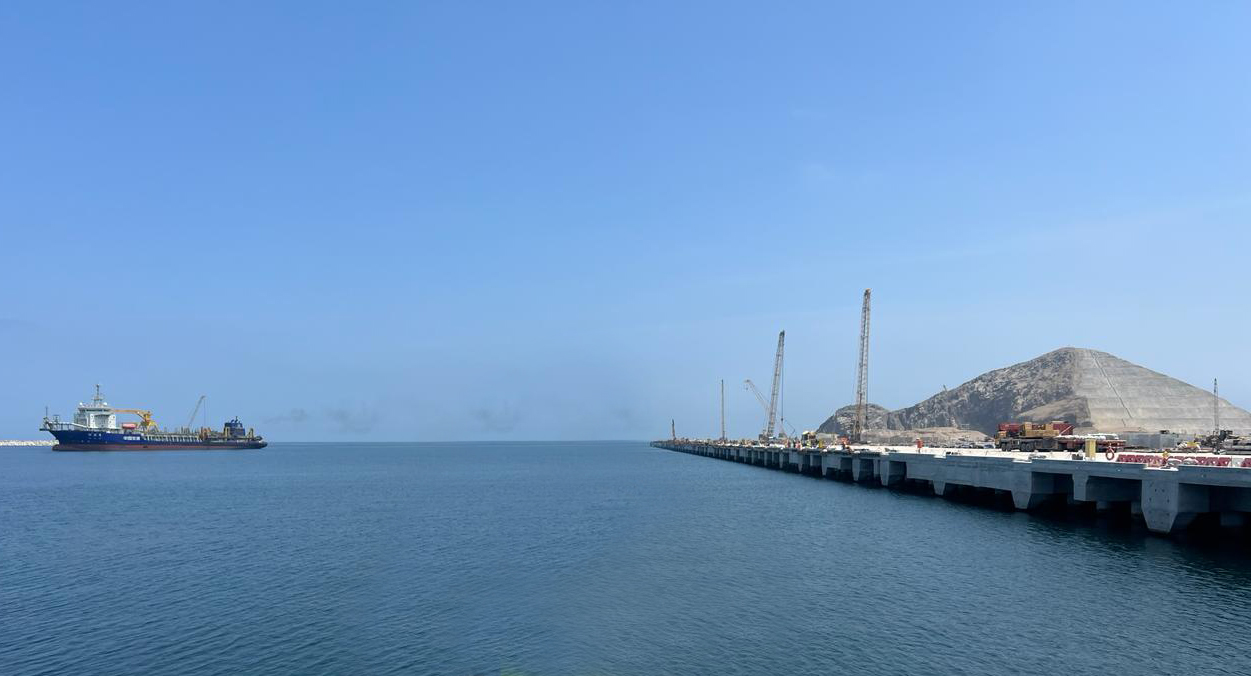
- Port of Chancay before its opening
- Interactive map of Port of Chancay

Location
- Country: Peru
- Location: Chancay, Peru
- Coordinates: 11.593°S 77.277°W

Details
- Opened: November 14, 2024; 2 years ago
- Operated by: Cosco Shipping Ports Chancay Perú S.A.
- Owned by: China COSCO Shipping Ports; Peru Volcan Mining Company

Statistics
- Website coscochancay.pe

The Port of Chancay is a shipping terminal located in Chancay, Peru. It was developed by Cosco Shipping Ports Chancay Perú S.A., a corporation made up by Chinese state-owned shipping and logistics company COSCO Shipping Ports in association with the Peruvian company Volcan. The port is part of the Belt and Road Initiative; and according to Peruvian law, it is considered a private port for public use, granting the operator exclusivity to provide port services.

The port is located approximately 60 kilometers north of Lima. A total of 3.5 billion USD will be invested in the construction of the port and its facility. Concerns have been raised about the potential dual use of the port.

The opening of the port of Chancay decongests the Port of Callao, but it has been noted that it does not help the issue of Peruvian port capacity being underdeveloped in the north and south of the country.

== History ==
In 2007, former Peruvian Navy Admiral Juan Ribaudo de la Torre conceived the construction of a substantial commercial port south of the historic Chancay Marina, leading to the establishment of the Chancay Harbor Company (CHP), which would supply the necessary land for the project. In 2011, Ribaudo and his business, in collaboration with Volcano Mining Peru, established the company Chancay Port Terminals (TPCH) to advance the port project, encompassing a multipurpose port terminal and a logistics complex.

In 2019, Volcano Mining and COSCO Shipping announced the execution of a commercial partnership agreement to advance the project. The involvement of the Chinese enterprise facilitated the reconstruction and expansion of the project, encompassing new design, engineering development, building, and operation of a substantial port complex, with a total expenditure anticipated to reach $3 billion. Following COSCO Shipping Ports' capital infusion, the business acquired a 60% stake in the project, leaving Peru's Volcano Mining business's ownership diminished to 40%. Also, the company was renamed from Chancay Port Terminals to Cosco Shipping Ports Chancay Perú S.A.

The first stage of the port was finished by the end of 2024. The port was inaugurated on 14 November 2024 in a ceremony attended online by Chinese leader Xi Jinping and Peruvian president Dina Boluarte, subsequent to the issuance of the directive by the two chiefs of state to commence port operations. Peruvian Foreign Minister Elmer Schialer previously affirmed that the action was taken for "security reasons". Following the directives from the two heads of state for the port's opening, the COSCO Peru vessel and the New Shanghai vessel commenced unloading operations.

New railways are proposed to serve this port. In July 2025, China and Brazil formally announced an exploration into a railway connecting Chancay to Brazil's Atlantic coast. Chinese contractor Power China will build a new 120km line to connect the port with Peru's central highlands.

In February 2026, the US State Department warned that China's control of the port threatened Peru's sovereignty after a Peruvian court ruling that prevented local regulators from overseeing the port.

== Capacity ==
In the first expansion phase, around one million containers can be handled per year.

The port of Chancay possesses significant advantages compared to other ports in the South Pacific: a natural draft of 17.8 meters (58.4 feet) and a strategic geographic position on Peru's central coast, in proximity to the Port of Callao, Jorge Chávez International Airport, and the Initiative for the Integration of the Regional Infrastructure of South America, as well as the Central Amazonian Interoceanic Corridor, which is designed to accommodate vessels with capacities exceeding 18,000 TEUs. Similarly, the initial phase will comprise four jetties with a length of 400 meters.

The port project comprises three elements: the port operations zone, designated for embarkation activities. The alternative is the entry complex, which will encompass the vehicle port, entry gate, customs inspection area, administrative offices, logistics and support services area, and the interconnecting tunnel with the Pan-American Highway. The primary operational objective for port construction is to facilitate the transportation of about 1 million TEUs and a total of 6 million cargo items annually.

== Business structure and context ==
China was building the harbor as a gate from South America to China due to its interest in this resource-rich neighboring continent. Peruvian mining company Volcan will own a 40% share of the company and COSCO Shipping will hold the remaining 60%. The Peruvian Congress passed a law granting Cosco exclusive use of the port; which has stirred controversy in Peru regarding Chinese influence.

Xi Jinping has said the port is expected to generate $4.5 billion annually and create 8,000 jobs. The Chancay Industrial Park and the multipurpose port are scheduled for concurrent construction. Both will establish ports and industrial hubs with integrated multi-functionality, encompassing logistics, industrial zones, service and technology complexes, and residential regions. Chancay Park will undergo development in four phases: the initial phase will concentrate on logistics and warehousing, whilst the subsequent phases will emphasize industrial development. The concluding step will entail real estate implementation.

The establishment of the new port in 2024 has garnered some attention in Chile regarding if it will reduce costs for Chilean trade given it will compete with the Port of Callao or if it will lead to trade diversion and higher prices for Chinese goods as result of transhipments in it.

== Prospect ==
Despite Peru's political turbulence, the Chancay port project has received broad support from the Chinese and Peruvian governments. The port is expected to shorten trans-Pacific Ocean shipping time and function as a key gateway to South America. Analysts note that, unlike the CK Hutchison's Panama port sale deal, the Chancay port development is regarded as economically significant and less likely to trigger similar tensions.

== See also ==
- Rail transport in Peru
- State visit by Dina Boluarte to China
- 2024 state visit by Xi Jinping to Peru and Brazil
