= Cosco Shipping Ports Chancay Perú S.A. =

Owner and operator of Port of Chancay, Peru

- Type: S.A.
- Industry: Transportation; Logistics
- Predecessor: Chancay Port Terminals SA
- Founded: 5 April 2011; 15 years ago, Lima, Peru
- Founders: Chancay Port SA; Empresa Administradora de Puertos SAC
- Headquarters: Chancay, Peru 11.593°S 77.277°W
- Key people: Carlos Tejada Mera (CEO)
- Owner: China Cosco Shipping Ports (60%); Peru Volcan Mining Company (40%)
- Website: coscochancay.pe

Cosco Shipping Ports Chancay Perú S.A. (before named Chancay Port Terminals SA) is a private company that owns and operates the Chancay Port Terminal, located about 75 km north of the city of Lima, in the region of the same name.

The Chinese company Cosco Shipping Ports owns 60% of the company, the remaining 40% are owned by the Peruvian company Volcan Compañía Minera S.A.A.

== History ==
In 2007, former Peruvian Navy Admiral Juan Ribaudo de la Torre conceived the construction of a substantial commercial port south of the historic Chancay Marina, leading to the establishment of the company Chancay Harbor (CHP), which would supply the necessary land for the project. In 2011, Ribaudo and his business, in collaboration with Volcano Mining Peru, established the company Chancay Port Terminals SA (TPCH) to advance the port project.

In 2019, Volcano Mining and COSCO Shipping announced the execution of a commercial partnership agreement to advance the project. The involvement of the Chinese enterprise facilitated the expansion of the project, with total expenditure anticipated to reach $3 billion. Following COSCO Shipping Ports' capital infusion, the business acquired a 60% stake in the project, while Peru's Volcan Compañía Minera S.A.A. business's ownership diminished to 40%. Also, the company was renamed from Chancay Port Terminals S.A. to Cosco Shipping Ports Chancay Perú S.A.

On 14 November 2024 in a ceremony attended online by Chinese leader Xi Jinping and Peruvian president Dina Boluarte, subsequent to the issuance of the directive by the two chiefs of state, the company started operations in the port.
