= 2024 state visit by Xi Jinping to Peru and Brazil =

CCP General Secretary Xi Jinping's visit in 2024

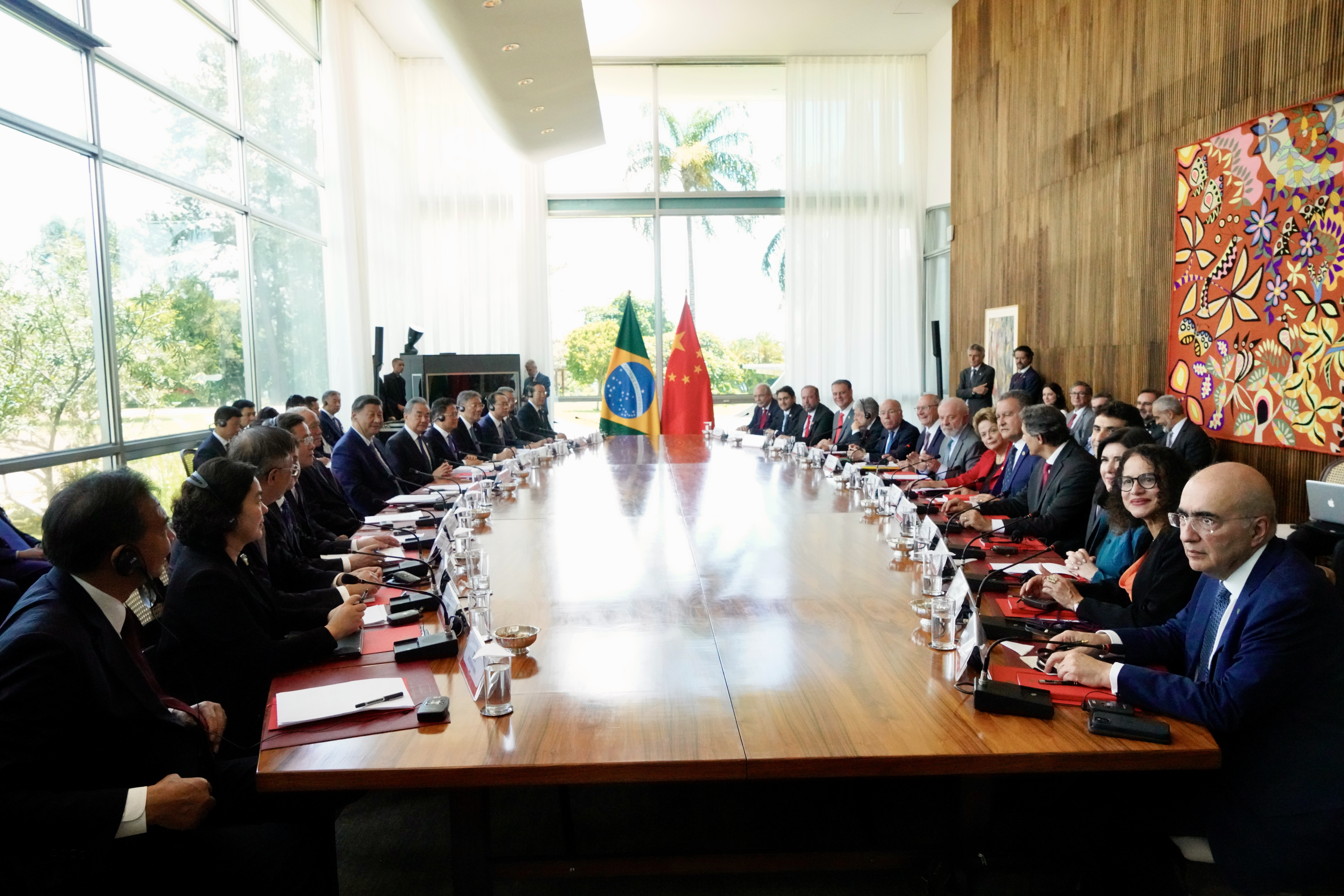
- Date: November 13 to 21, 2024
- Venue: Lima and Rio de Janeiro
- Organised by: Government of Peru; Government of Brazil; Government of China

President of China and General Secretary of the Chinese Communist Party Xi Jinping visited Lima, Peru, at the request of President of Peru Dina Boluarte, to participate in the 31st Informal Asia-Pacific Economic Cooperation Leaders' Meeting and conduct a state visit from November 13 to 17, 2024. At the behest of President Luiz Inácio Lula da Silva of the Federative Republic of Brazil, President Xi also paid a visit to Rio de Janeiro from November 17 to 21 to participate in the 2024 G20 Rio de Janeiro summit and conduct a state visit to Brazil.

== Peru ==
Xi Jinping's initial agenda in Peru is the inauguration of Chancay Mega-port, a $1.3 billion megaport, which will prominently showcase China's regional power. Total investment is projected to exceed $3.5 billion during the forthcoming decade.

On November 14, Xi Jinping engaged in discussions with Peruvian President Boruarte at the presidential palace in Lima. Subsequent to the discussions, the two leaders observed the signing of the “Cooperation Plan between the Government of the People's Republic of China and the Government of the Republic of Peru on Jointly Building the ‘Belt and Road’” and the “Protocol on Upgrading the Free Trade Agreement between the Government of the People's Republic of China and the Government of the Republic of Peru,” along with the exchange of several bilateral cooperation documents pertaining to economics, trade, industry and investment, industrial parks, education, and green development. The two parties released the Joint Declaration of the People's Republic of China and the Republic of Peru for the enhancement of the Comprehensive Strategic Partnership.

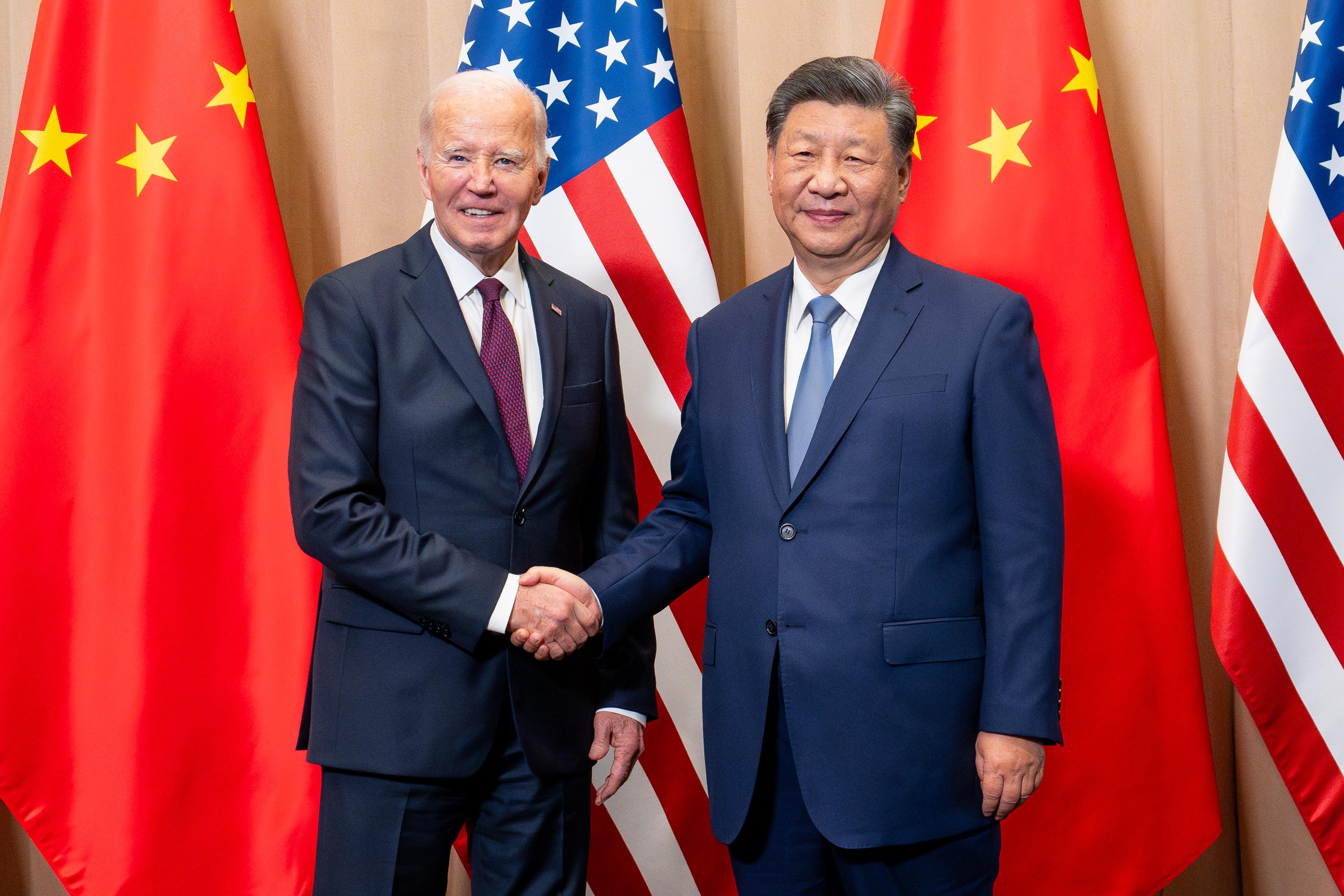
Joe Biden meeting Xi Jinping on November 16, 2024

In the evening, Xi Jinping and Dina Boluarte participated in the virtual inauguration of Chancay Port from the Presidential Palace in Lima. Xi and Boruarte received briefings from the leaders of the transportation agencies of both nations and viewed a video regarding the Chancay Port initiative, subsequent to the issuance of the directive by the two chiefs of state to commence port operations. On the morning of November 15, President Xi conducted separate meetings with Prime Minister of Thailand Paetongtarn Shinawatra, Prime Minister of Singapore Lawrence Wong, and President of South Korea Yoon Suk Yeol during the APEC Leaders' Informal Meeting in Lima. In the afternoon, President Xi convened with President of Chile Gabriel Boric, Prime Minister of New Zealand Christopher Luxon, and Prime Minister of Japan Shigeru Ishiba.

On November 16, US President Joe Biden conferred with Xi Jinping during the 2024 Asia-Pacific Economic Cooperation Summit.

== Brazil ==
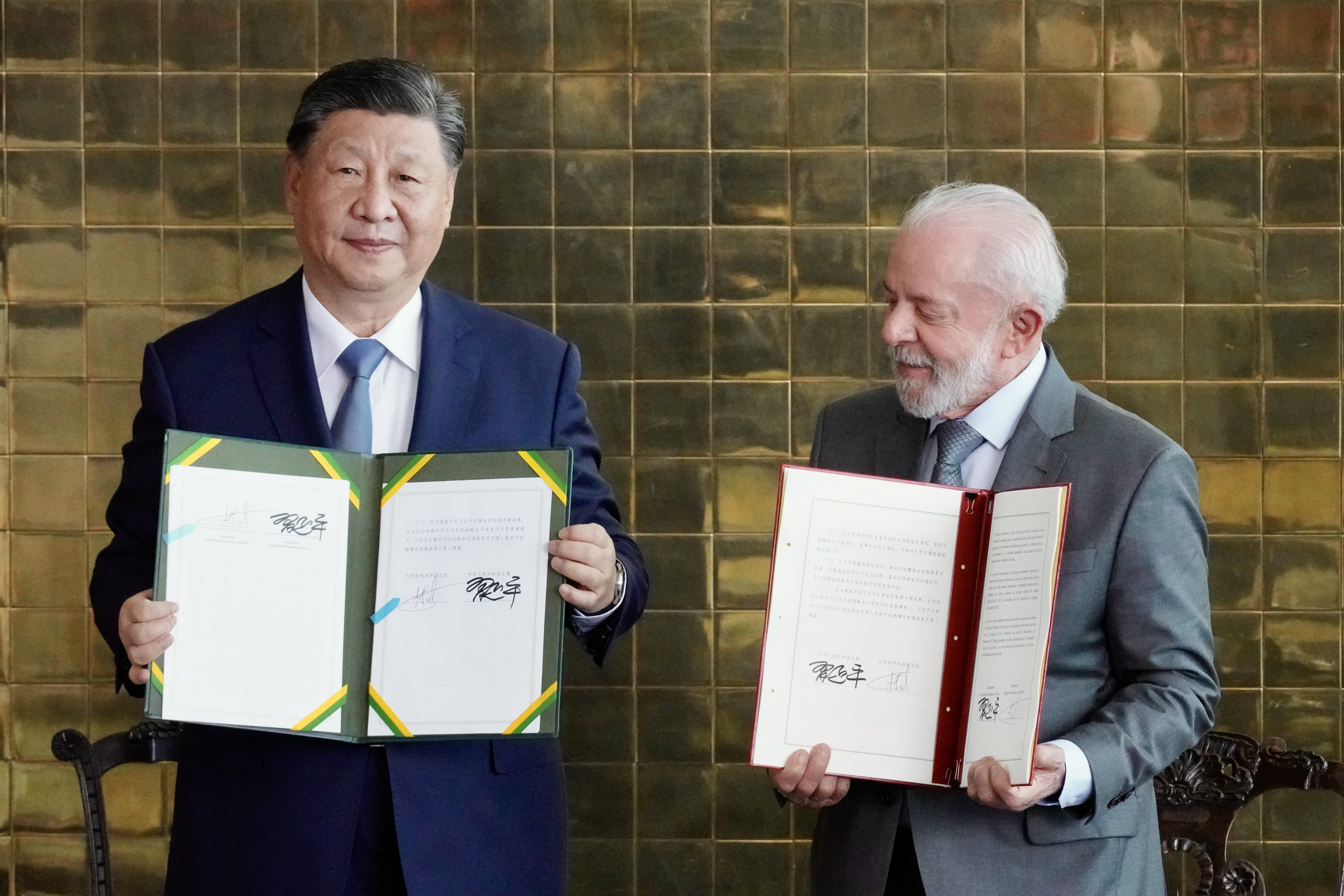
Xi Jinping and Lula during the signing of agreements between the Government of Brazil and the Government of China at the Alvorada Palace in Brasilia.

Xi Jinping arrived at Galeão International Airport in Rio de Janeiro on the November 17 to participate in the G20 leaders and to conduct a state visit to Brazil.

On the morning of November 18, Xi Jinping convened with Prime Minister of the United Kingdom Keir Starmer and Prime Minister of Australia Anthony Albanese during the G20 Leaders Summit in Rio de Janeiro. In the afternoon, President Xi convened with President Claudia Sheinbaum of Mexico. On the morning of November 19, 2024, President Xi met with Chancellor of Germany Olaf Scholz, French President Emmanuel Macron, President of Bolivia Luis Arce, and President of Argentina Javier Milei.

He thereafter went to Brasília on November 20 for a state visit extended by Lula, during which announcements about Brazilian exports to China and Chinese investments in urban transportation, aviation, and electric vehicles are anticipated. During this visit, about 40 international agreements were established in sectors including trade, agriculture, industry, investment, research and technology, communications, health, energy, culture, education, and tourism.

== See also ==
- 16th BRICS summit
- 2023 Brazil–China summit
- APEC Peru 2024
- 2024 G20 Rio de Janeiro summit
- State visit by Dina Boluarte to China
