= Chungar Mine =

Mine in Peru

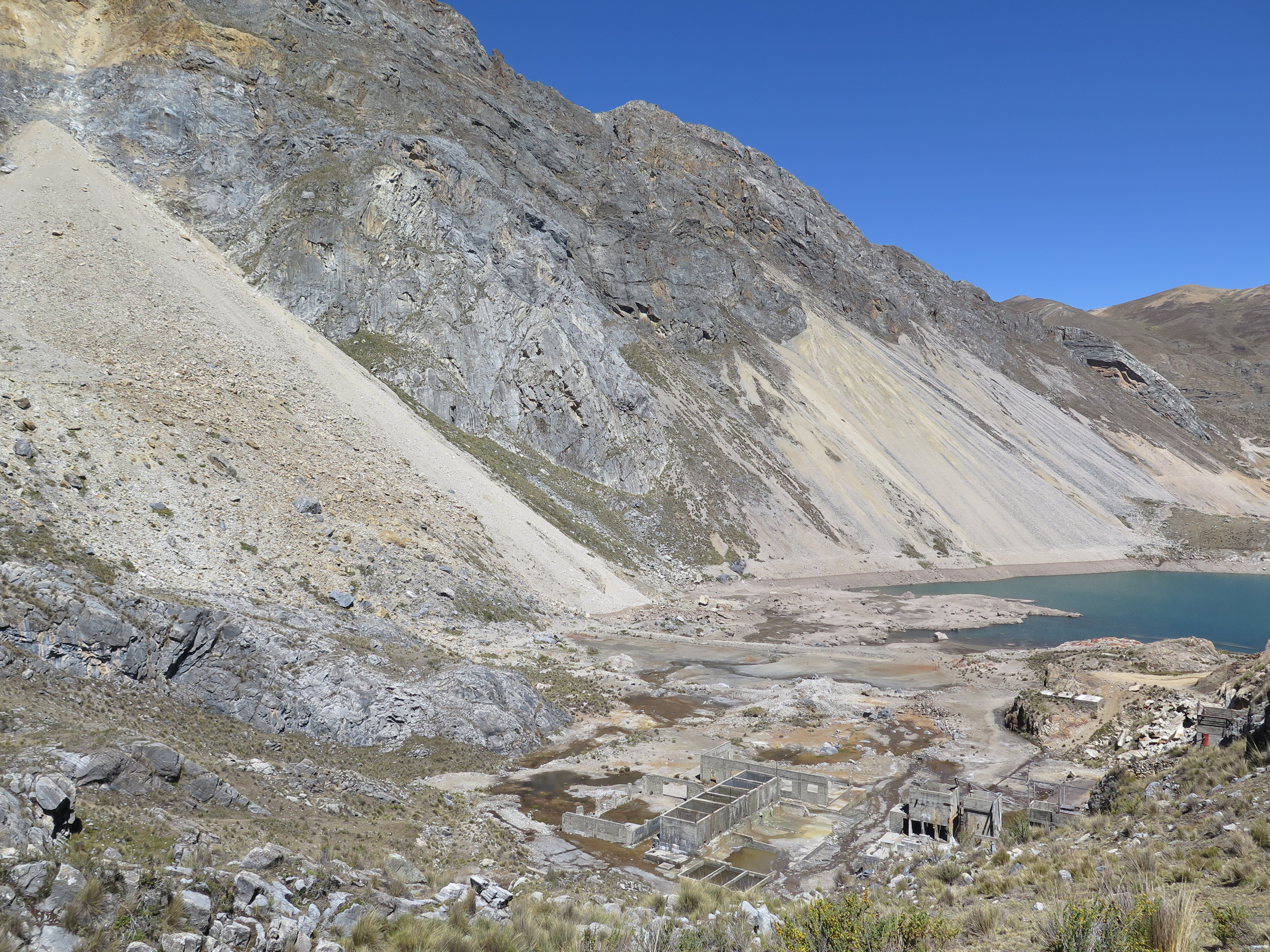
Remains of the Chungar Mine camp that was destroyed by a landslide-generated wave at the Yanawayin Lake. Picture looking SW.

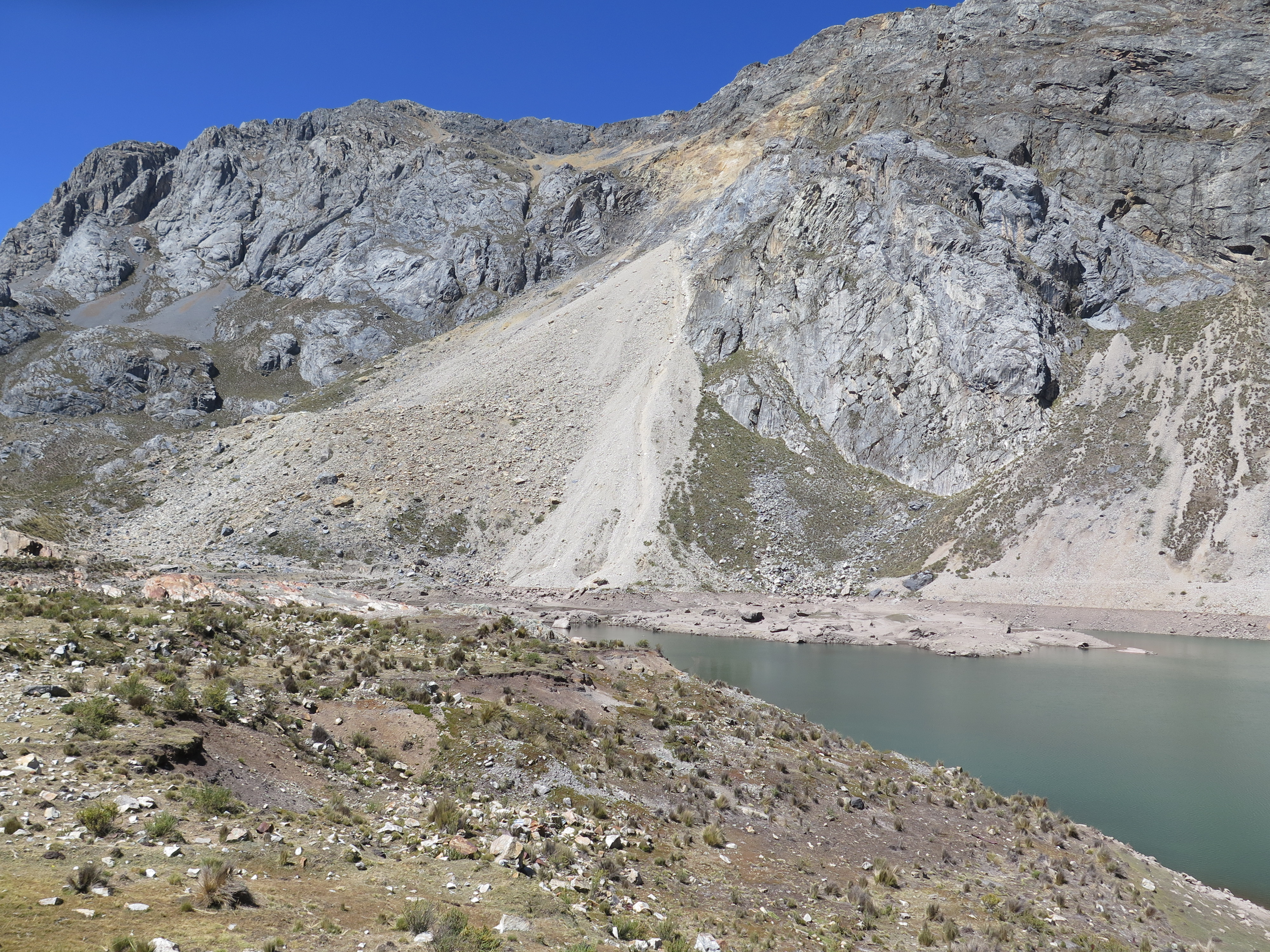
Yanawayin Lake and, behind, the landslide that destroyed most of the Chungar Mine camp in 1971. Picture looking E.

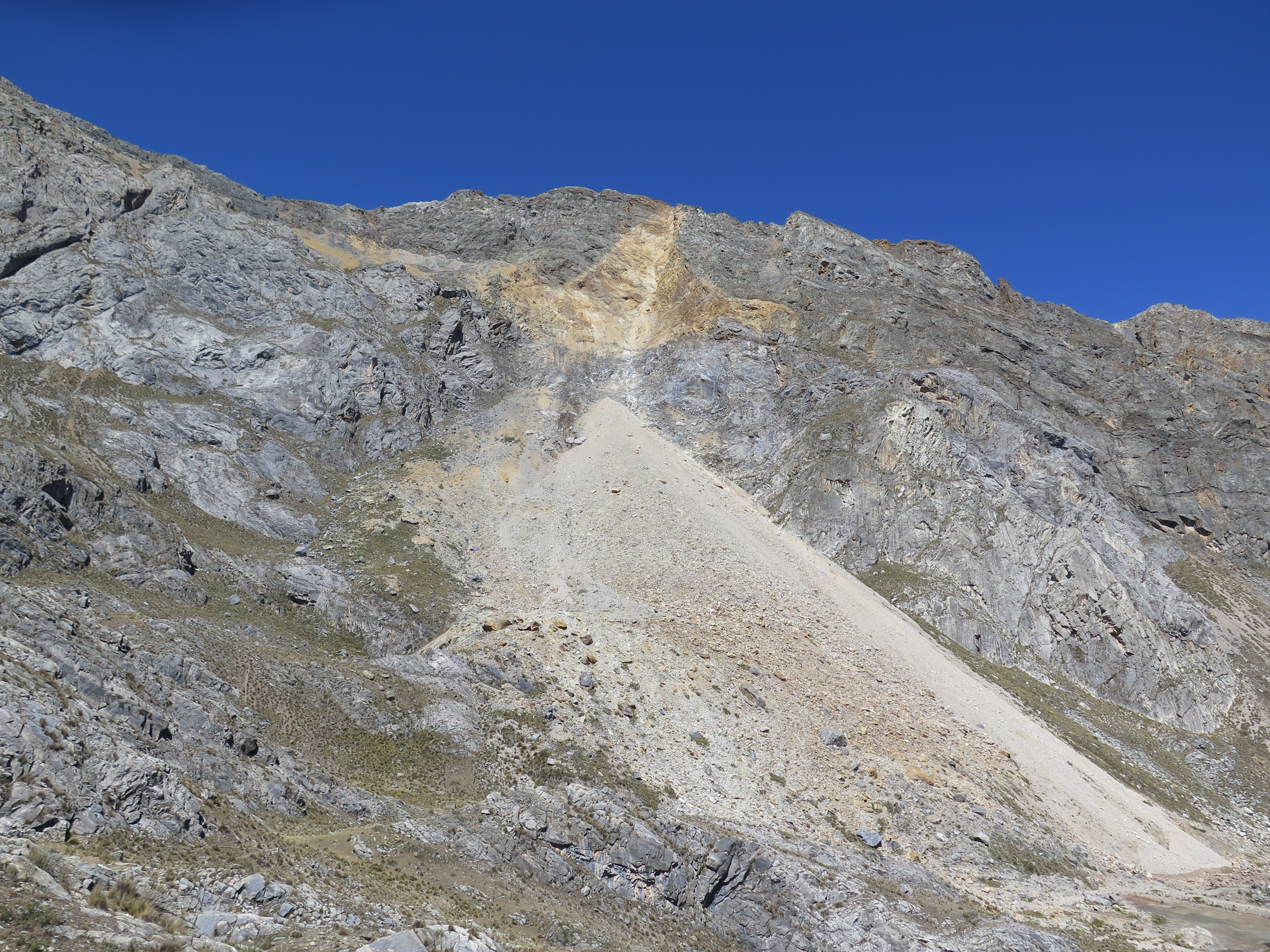
Upper part of the landslide that generated the tsunami that destroyed most of the Chungar Mine camp in 1971. Picture looking S.

The Chungar Mine, inactive, exploited a polymetallic (Zn-Pb-Cu-Ag) skarn deposit in the high Andes of central Peru. It is located about 116 km NE of Lima, 57 km southwest of Cerro de Pasco, and 82 km northwest of La Oroya in the (Santa Cruz de Andamarca District, Huaral Province, Lima Region, 11°07′27″S 76°31′56″W, 4380 m.a.s.l.). In 1971, a landslide-generated wave ("landslide tsunami") at the Yanawayin Lake destroyed most of the surface facilities and killed 200-600 persons, including miners in flooded underground workings.

The mine was owned by Cia. Minera Chungar, S.A.C. After the 1971 disaster, this mining company, keeping the same name, transferred the operations 16 km NE to the Animón mine in the Huarón Mining District.

Between 1995 and 2008, Compañía Minera Cerro S.A. rehabilitated some underground workings and had a small scale operation.

Since 2015, the mining company Volcan is exploring the surroundings of the Chungar Mine (Romina project) including the Puagjanca area where a Zn-Pb-(Ag) ore body was discovered.

== Confusion on the term "Chungar Mine" ==
The mining company Volcan through its now subsidiary Compañía Minera Chungar S.A.C., operates the polymetallic Animón and Islay mines, in the Huarón Mining District, located 16 km NE of the actual Chungar Mine, under the term "Mining Unit Chungar" (Unidad minera Chungar). The use by Volcan of this term "Chungar Mining Unit" has caused some confusion, and certain sources (e.g., the data base "alicia.concytec.gob.pe" and a WoodMackenzie Report) use wrongly the term of "Chungar mine" for the Animón mine.

== Geology ==
The Chungar skarn deposit belongs to the Miocene polymetallic belt of Central Peru. The skarn Zn-Pb-Cu-Ag mineralization occurs mainly at the western contact of the Chungar Granite with limestone of the Cretaceous Jumasha Formation and in roof pendants. Ore consists mainly of sphalerite, galena, chalcopyrite, and pyrrhotite in andradite skarn. Age determinations on the outcropping Chungar granite yield an age of 12.88 ± 0.36 Ma (Ar/Ar biotite plateau age) that is consistent with previous K-Ar age determinations.

Similar skarn occurrences are known north and south of the Chungar Mine (e.g. Don Miguel prospect, 11°03′00″S 76°33′25″W, 8 km north of the Chungar Mine and 1 km E of the Chalhuacocha granodiorite, which was K-Ar dated at 10.0±0.3 Ma on biotite, and the Puagjanca ore body, 4 km to the south).
