= Willkaqucha =

Lake in Peru

- Location within Peru
- Location: Peru; Lima Region, Huaral Province
- Coordinates: 11°11′55″S 76°30′38″W

Willkaqucha (Quechua willka grandchild / great-grandson / lineage / minor god in the Inca culture, an image of the Willkanuta valley worshipped as God / holy, sacred, divine, willka or wilka Anadenanthera colubrina (a tree), qucha lake) hispanicized spelling Vilcacocha) is a lake in Peru. It is located in the Lima Region, Huaral Province, Andamarca District.

== See also ==
- Yanawayin Lake
