= Salinas Grandes mine =

Lithium mine in Jujuy, Argentina

- Location: Jujuy Province, Argentina
- Products: Lithium

The Salinas Grandes mine is one of the largest lithium mines in Argentina. The mine is located in northern Argentina in Jujuy Province. The Salinas Grandes mine has reserves amounting to 20 million tonnes of lithium ore grading 1.2% lithium thus resulting 293,000 tonnes of lithium.

== See also ==
- Mining in Argentina
