= Bromine production in the United States =

Past and Present Bromine Extraction Plants

Bromine production in the United States of 225,000 tonnes in 2013 made that country the second-largest producer of bromine, after Israel. The US supplied 29 percent of world production. Since 2007, all US bromine has been produced by two companies in southern Arkansas, which extract bromine from brine pumped from the Smackover Formation. At an advertised price of US$3.50 to US$3.90 per kg, the US 2013 US production would have a value of roughly US$800 million.

The two active bromine producers are Albemarle Corporation and Chemtura, whose bromine operations together employ 950 people. Albemarle Corporation, whose corporate headquarters is in Charlotte, North Carolina, operates two main plants at Magnolia, in Columbia County, Arkansas, and some satellite plants in Union County. In 2007, Albemarle had capacity to produce 148,000 tons of bromine per year.

Chemtura, a Philadelphia-based corporation, operates four plants through its subsidiary, Great Lakes Solutions. Three plants are in the vicinity of El Dorado, and all in Union County, Arkansas. In 2007, Chemtura had the capacity to produce 130,000 tonnes of bromine per year.

Since 1969, all US bromine has been produced from subsurface brine. Previously, bromine was also recovered from sea water, either directly or from the bittern produced during solar salt operations.

== Geology ==
Bromine-bearing brines are associated with saline deposits. The bromine content of sea water is 60 to 70 parts per million (ppm). As sea water evaporates, a succession of minerals precipitate, concentrating the bromine. Bromide is so soluble that it does not form saline minerals. After halite (rock salt) precipitates, the remaining brine, called bittern, contains about 2,700 ppm bromine. Bromine continues to concentrate as magnesium and potassium minerals precipitate. The brine remaining after potassium mineral precipitation may contain 6,000 ppm bromine.

Underground sources of bromine-rich brines are associated with halite deposits. The process of concentrating bromine by evaporation artificially to produce sea salt replicates the natural process, and produces bromine-rich brine.

=== Appalachian Basin ===
The high-bromine brines in the Appalachian Basin are found in Silurian and Devonian rocks, in Pennsylvania, Ohio, and West Virginia. The principal source of the brine in Ohio and West Virginia was the Pottsville Formation, also called the Big Salt Sand. In Pennsylvania, bromine brine was pumped from the Pocono Sandstone.

=== Michigan Basin ===
In 1911, the principal source of bromine brine in the Michigan Basin was reported to be the Marshall Sandstone of Mississippian age, with bromine concentrations of between 1,000 and 3,000 ppm. By the late 1900s, production had shifted to the Filer Sandstone of the Detroit River Group, of Devonian age, with bromine concentrations of about 2,600 ppm.

=== Smackover Formation, Arkansas ===
The brine from the Smackover Limestone of Jurassic age carries 5,000 to 6,000 ppm bromine. The brine is believed to have migrated into the Smackover from the underlying Louann Salt, through the intervening Norphlet Formation.

Although Smackover brine was originally produced as a byproduct of oil production, commercial bromine operations have their own high-productivity brine wells.

=== Searles Lake, California ===
Searles Lake, California is today a seasonally dry lake within a closed drainage basin, but at various times during the past three million years, when rainfall was more plentiful, Searles Lake was much larger, and was one in a chain of six lakes ultimately draining into ancient Lake Manley, now the bottom of Death Valley. The water level in Searles Lakes fell below its outlet for the last time about 11 thousand years ago, but for some of the time since, received water flowing from Owens Lake and China Lake. The result of thousands of years of evaporation are the sediments below the present lake bed, which include two salt layers, and brine with high concentrations of bromine, along with potassium, sodium and boron.

Brine associated with the Upper Salt and Lower Salt intervals contains 500 to 900 ppm bromine. Concentrations above 800 ppm were used for bromine extraction, most production being from the Upper Salt.

== History ==
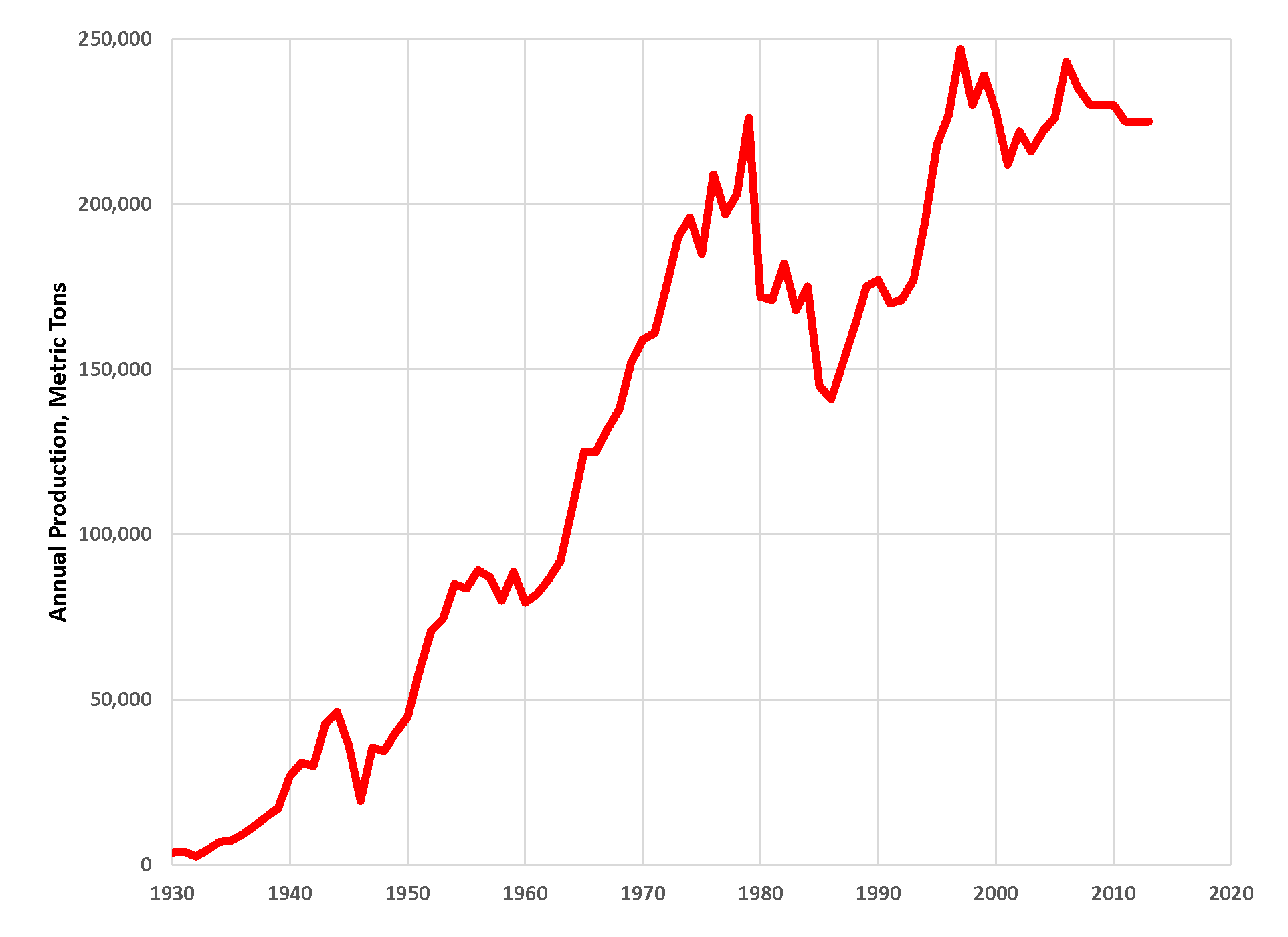
US bromine production, 1930-2012

US production of bromine began on a small scale in 1846, at the salt works at Freeport, Pennsylvania. Production expanded greatly after 1867, when salt manufacturers along the Ohio River Valley of Ohio and West Virginia began recovering bromine from the bittern brine left over after salt evaporation.

Production expanded further in 1897, when Herbert Dow founded the Dow Chemical Company, and started producing bromine from the brines of the Michigan Basin, using an improved bromine extraction process that he invented, "air stripping." With his new process, Dow was able to undercut the bromine prices of German producers, who had dominated the market up until then. Bromine started Dow Chemical, but the company quickly diversified into the giant chemical manufacturer it is today. For many years the Michigan Basin was the leading producer of bromine. In 1980, five companies were operating six bromine extraction plants in Michigan. The Dow Chemical Company closed Michigan's last operating bromine plant in 2007.

Searles Lake has yielded chemicals since borate minerals were harvested from the surface of the lake bed in 1874. Mineral recovery from subsurface brine started during World War I, when two chemical plants were built to recover potash; potash was needed for explosives, and the lake was the only known potash source in the US. In the 1920s, three companies operated chemical plants on the shore of the lakebed, and learned how to commercially produce lithium, phosphate, borax, soda ash, sodium sulfate. In 1940, companies began extracting bromine from the brine.

The first bromine extraction plant in Arkansas opened in 1957. By 1969, five companies were operating plants there.

For most of the 20th century, the principal use of bromine was as the gasoline additive ethylene dibromide, which was needed in leaded gasoline to prevent lead deposits in car engines. The US EPA curtailed the use of lead additives in gasoline in 1980, and eventually banned lead additives entirely. With the elimination of leaded gasoline bromine lost its largest market. However, new uses were found, and bromine production continued to grow.

=== Bromine from sea water ===
In 1926, the solar salt operation at San Mateo, on the south end of Francisco Bay, California, began recovering bromine from the bittern left over after salt precipitation. The plant went out of business in 1930, but another salt plant opened in 1931 at nearby Fremont, and extracted bromine until 1968.

Another solar salt operation on San Diego Bay also started extracting bromine in 1926; the plant closed in 1945.

The Ethyl Corporation, the principal consumer of bromine, developed a process to extract bromine from sea water without evaporation. A joint venture between Ethyl and Dow Chemical started a direct from sea water plant at Kure Beach, North Carolina in 1933. The location at Kure Beach had no rail access, and difficult highway access, and was shut down in 1945.

Dow found a better permanent location at Freeport, Texas, where a seawater extraction plant started in 1940, and a second in 1943. The Freeport plants recovered magnesium, sodium compounds, and chlorine, in addition to the bromine. The Freeport chemical operations are still active, but they stopped extracting bromine in 1969.

== See also ==
- Brine mining
