= Deseado Massif =

Massif in southern Patagonia

Deseado Massif Macizo del Deseado (Spanish)
- Massif
- Coordinates: 47°37′20″S 67°52′00″W
- Location: Puerto Deseado, Patagonia, Santa Cruz, Argentina

The Deseado Massif (Spanish: Macizo del Deseado) is a massif in southern Patagonia located in the Argentine province of Santa Cruz. On surface the massif is made up of Middle to Late Jurassic-aged felsic volcanic rocks. Analysis of mantle xenoliths reveals that the lithospheric mantle of the Deseado Massif is about 2100 to 1000 million years old. As such the Deseado Massif is one of the oldest regions of Patagonia as it existed in some form during the Paleo and Mesoproterozoic. In the Neoproterozoic the Deseado Massif together with the Geology of the Malvinas Islands formed part of the supercontinent Rodinia. Since then Deseado Massif has been next to the Falkland Islands.

The eastern sector of the Deseado Massif contains a Jurassic caldera with a zircon U–Pb eruption age of 178.7 ± 1.9 million years.

== Economic geology ==
The Deseado Massif contains valuable epithermal gold deposits. The richness of Deseado Massif in gold may stem from its ancient and enriched mantle lithosphere. Cerro Vanguardia and Manantial Espejo are among the gold mines in the massif.

In 2017, an international group of scientists, while researching the origins of gold, historically established that it "came to the Earth's surface from the deepest regions of our planet," evidenced by their findings in the Deseado Massif.
