= Pirquitas mine =

Silver mine in Jujuy, Argentina

- Location: Jujuy Province, Argentina
- Products: silver

The Pirquitas mine is a large silver mine located in the north of Argentina in Jujuy Province. Pirquitas represents one of the largest silver reserve in Argentina and in the world having estimated reserves of 74 million oz of silver.

== See also ==
- Mining in Argentina
