= Yana Uqsha (Lima) =

Mountain in Peru

- Location within Peru

Highest point
- Elevation: 5,000 m (16,000 ft)
- Coordinates: 11°04′51″S 76°31′12″W

Geography
- Location: Peru, Lima Region
- Parent range: Andes

Yana Uqsha (Quechua yana black, very dark, uqsha (locally), uqsa high altitude grass, hispanicized spelling Yanahojsha) is a mountain in the Andes of Peru, about 5,000 m (16,000 ft) high. It is located in the Lima Region, Huaral Province, Andamarca District. It lies southwest of Warunqucha.
