= Santa Cruz de Andamarca District =

Coordinates: 11°11′39″S 76°38′03″W

Santa Cruz de Andamarca Antamarka
- District
- Interactive map of Santa Cruz de Andamarca
- Country: Peru
- Region: Lima
- Province: Huaral
- Founded: March 19, 1965
- Capital: Santa Cruz de Andamarca

Government
  - Mayor: Enrique Joel Liceta Paez

Area
  - Total: 216.92 km^{2} (83.75 sq mi)
- Elevation: 3,522 m (11,555 ft)

Population (2017)
  - Total: 830
  - Density: 3.8/km^{2} (9.9/sq mi)
- Time zone: UTC-5 (PET)
- UBIGEO: 150610

Santa Cruz de Andamarca District is one of twelve districts of the province Huaral in Peru.

== See also ==
- Puwaq Hanka
- Puwaq Hanka mountain range
- Willkaqucha
- Yana Uqsha
- Yanawayin Lake
- Chungar Mine
