= Cerro Vanguardia Mine =

Mine in Argentina

- Location in Argentina
- Location: Puerto San Julián, Santa Cruz, Argentina; 48°23′09″S 068°15′49″W
- Products: Gold; Silver
- Production: Gold: 208,000 oz Silver: 2,200,000 oz
- Financial year: 2009
- Opened: 1998
- Company: AngloGold Ashanti 92.5% Formicruz 7.5%
- Website: AngloGold Ashanti website Formicruz website

The Cerro Vanguardia Mine is a gold and silver mine located 150 km north west of Puerto San Julián, in the Santa Cruz province of Argentina.

== History ==
The gold deposit at Cerro Vanguardia was first discovered in 1976 and, in 1987, mining group Pérez Companc S.A. formed a mineral exploration joint venture with AMSA, Anglo American’s South American holding company.

AngloGold, predecessor of AngloGold Ashanti, acquired a 46.23% interest in the project in 1998–99, and an additional 46.25%, the Pérez Companc stake, in July 2002, doubling its interest to 92.5%. AngloGold Ashanti owns the right to exploit the deposit for 40 years based on the Usufruct Agreement, signed in December 1996. Cerro Vanguardia, which was constructed at a total cost of US$ 270 million, was commissioned in late 1998.

The mine suffered a difficult year in 2008, when production fell by 25% while the cash cost more than doubled. The company did however manage to improve production in 2009 and lower the cash cost again. In 2009, the mine was also fatality-free for the seventh consecutive year.

Plans at Cerro Vanguardia included an underground operation, from 2010, and a heap leach operation.

As of 2004 it was majority-owned and operated by AngloGold Ashanti, which held a 92.5% interest in the mine. The remaining 7.5% was owned by Formicruz (Fomento Minero de Santa Cruz Sociedad del Estado), a company owned by the province of Santa Cruz.

In 2008, the mine contributed 3% to the company's annual production and employed in excess of 1,000 people. The Cerro Vanguardia mine consists of a number of small open pits.

After considering selling off smaller mines under the control of AngloGold, in July 2026 profits were up enough that the company made a public statement that they were no longer working to sell those smaller mines.

== Geology ==
Geologically the mine lies in Deseado Massif, an area known for its valuable gold deposits.

== Gold production ==
Recent production figures of the mine were:

| Year | Production (oz) | Grade | Cost per ounce |
|---|---|---|---|
| 2003 | 226,000 | 7.15 g/t | US$ 143 |
| 2004 | 229,000 | 7.60 g/t | US$ 156 |
| 2005 | 228,000 | 7.70 g/t | US$ 171 |
| 2006 | 232,000 | 7.29 g/t | US$ 225 |
| 2007 | 220,000 | 6.8 g/t | US$ 261 |
| 2008 | 166,000 | 5.44 g/t | US$ 608 |
| 2009 | 208,000 | 6.51 g/t | US$ 355 |
| 2010 | | | |
