= 2024 state visit by Dina Boluarte to China =

State visit by Dina Boluarte to China
- Date: June 2024
- Venue: Shenzhen, Shanghai, Suzhou and Beijing
- Organised by: Government of Peru; Government of China

President of Peru Dina Boluarte pays a state visit to China to meet with General Secretary of the Chinese Communist Party Xi Jinping during June 25, 2024 to June 29, 2024. The visit resulted in the signing of a number of China-Peru cooperation agreements, and the two sides expect China to bring more new technologies into Peru and make the cooperation between China and Peru a model of China-Latin America cooperation.

== Background ==
In May 2024, the Minister of Agriculture and Irrigation of Peru Andrés Alencastre spoke to reporters at the national palace following a cabinet meeting, noting that the agenda for June's presidential summit is expected to cover 29 issues including the potential beef trade with China.

On June 5, 2024, the plenary session of the Congress of the Republic of Peru approved Draft Legislative Resolution 8019 that authorizes the departure of President Dina Boluarte to China.

Boluarte is scheduled to meet with executives from Chinese telecoms giant Huawei, electric carmaker BYD, port services provider COSCO Shipping Ports, Jinzhao Mining and China Railway Construction Corporation (CRCC). In January 2019, COSCO Shipping Group acquired a 60% stake in Puerto Chancay, and the project entered the construction phase after the official delivery. Puerto Chancay is scheduled to open at the end of 2024, when Peru will host the 2024 Asia-Pacific Economic Cooperation (APEC) summit.

On June 24, Foreign Ministry of China spokeswoman Hua Chunying announced that at the invitation of Chinese leader and Chinese Communist Party general secretary Xi Jinping, President of the Republic of Peru Dina Hercilia Boruarte Zegara will pay a state visit to China from June 25 to 29.

== Meeting ==
=== Shenzhen ===
On the evening of the 25th, President Boluarte arrived at Futian Station in Shenzhen from Hong Kong's West Kowloon Station by high-speed rail. In Shenzhen, Dina Boluarte visited Huawei and BYD Auto. Meanwhiles, Huawei signs deal to train thousands of Peruvians in new technology. In Shenzhen she also led a delegation to visit the Nanshan Museum, and held talks with executives of China Electronics Corp.

=== Shanghai ===
On June 26, President Boluarte arrived in Shanghai. On June 27, the President of Peru gave a keynote speech at the "Peru Investment Opportunities" forum held in Shanghai, inviting entrepreneurs to invest in Peru. She also held a meeting with executives from China Southern Power Grid.

=== Suzhou ===
On June 27, Xin Changxing, Secretary of the Jiangsu Provincial Committee of the Chinese Communist Party (CCP), met with Peruvian President Boruarte in Suzhou. The president expressed his hope to draw on Jiangsu's useful experience in cultural heritage protection, park construction, scientific and technological innovation, digital empowerment, etc., and to promote new achievements with cooperation. She also visited to Suzhou Industrial Park and Higer, an electric bus manufacturing company.

=== Beijing ===
On the afternoon of June 28, Xi Jinping held talks at the Great Hall of the People in Beijing with Peruvian President Peru Boruarte, who came to China for a state visit. After the talks, the two heads of state witnessed the signing of the Joint Action Plan of the Government of the People's Republic of China and the Government of the Republic of Peru for the period from 2024 to 2029, as well as a number of bilateral cooperation documents in the fields of economic and trade cooperation, digital economy, scientific and technological innovation, inspection and quarantine, and news media. The two sides announced the substantive completion of negotiations on the upgrading of the free trade agreement. The two countries also announced the official conclusion of negotiations on upgrading their free-trade agreement, a process started in 2018.

In the afternoon of the same day, Chinese Premier Li Qiang and Zhao Leji, Chairman of the Standing Committee of the National People's Congress (NPC), met with President Boruarte at the Great Hall of the People in Beijing, respectively.

== See also ==
- APEC Peru 2024
- China–Peru relations
- Embassy of China, Lima
- Chancay Mega-port
- 2024 state visit by Xi Jinping to Peru and Brazil
