= Huarón mine =

Mine in Peru

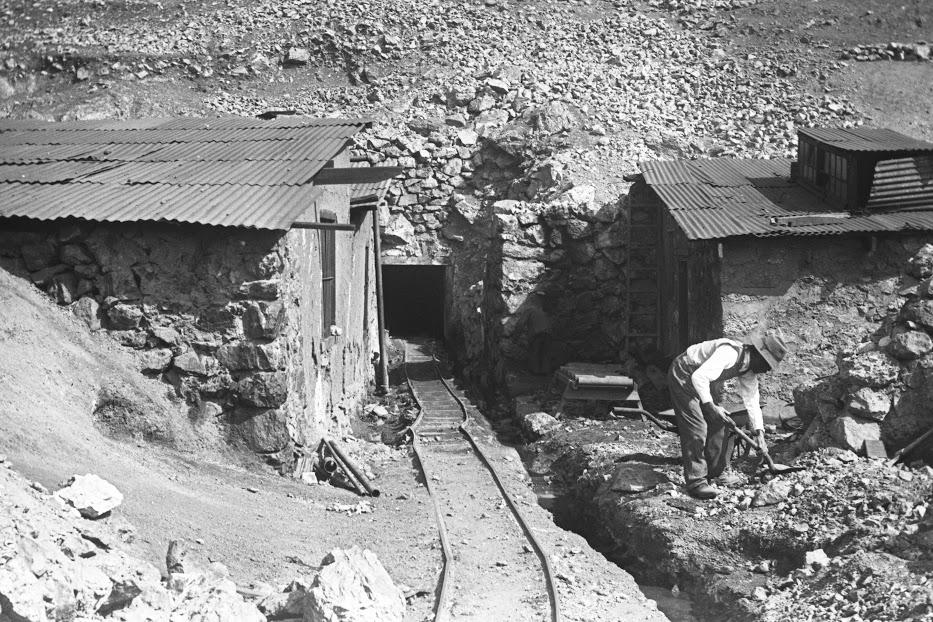
- Entrance to the Huarón mine in 1913
- Location: Pasco Region, Peru
- Products: silver, zinc, lead, copper

The Huarón mine is a large polymetallic (Zn-Pb-Ag-Cu) mine located in the center of Peru in the Pasco Region. Huarón represents one of the largest silver reserves in Peru and in the world, having in 2013 estimated reserves of 61.3 million oz of silver.

The mine was built in 1912. It was sold in 1987 to Hochschild and again in 2000 to Pan American Silver, which began operations in 2001. On April 10, 2010, Pan American Silver reported that workers had gone on strike over a profit-sharing payment dispute.

Huarón gives the name to the Huarón Mining District that includes other important polymetallic mines.

== See also ==
- Huarón Mining District
- List of mines in Peru
- Zinc mining
