= Yanawayin Lake =

Lake in Lima Region, Peru

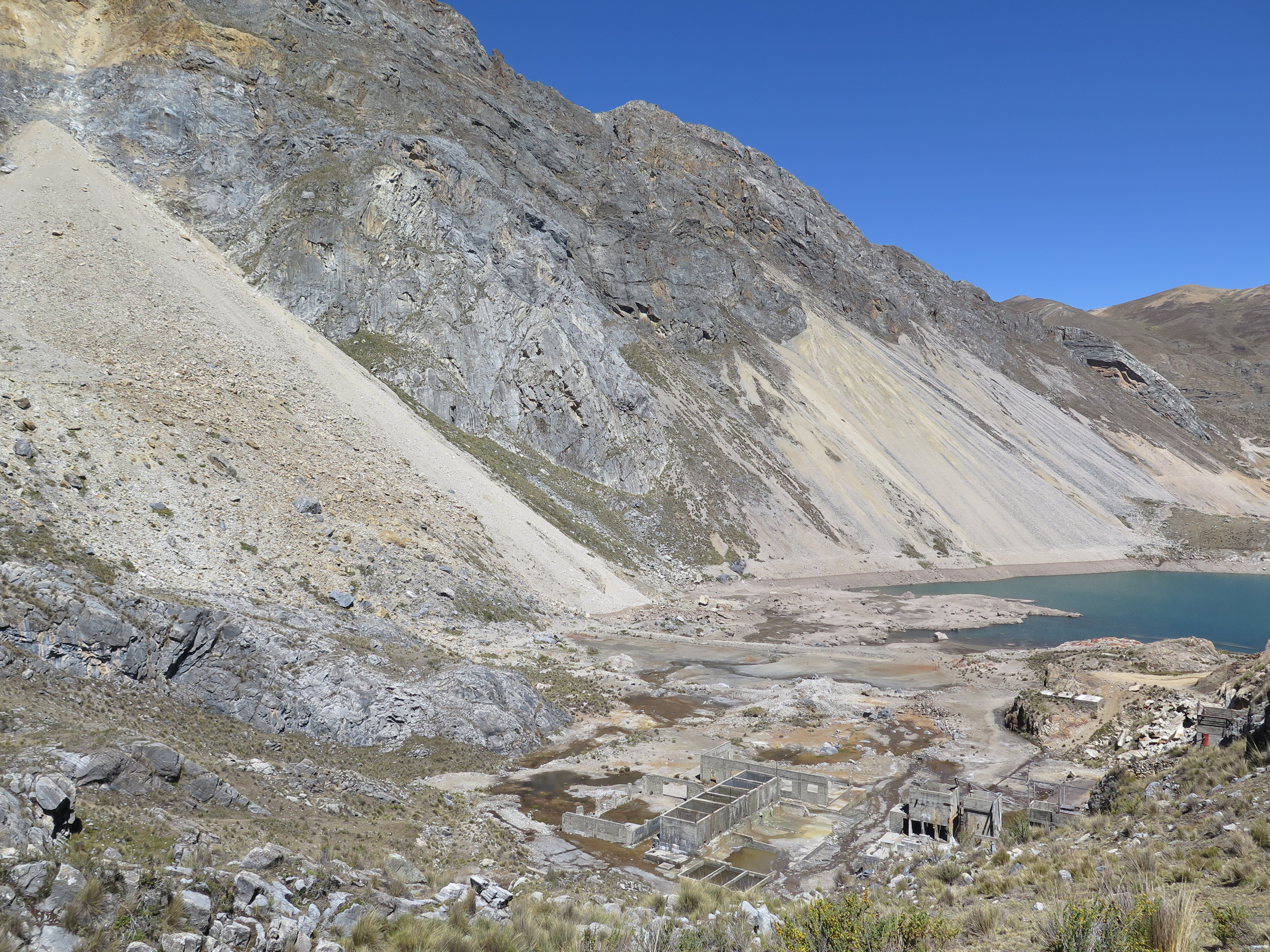
- Partial view of Yanawayin Lake. Remainings of the Chungar Mine camp. Picture looking SW

- Location within Peru
- Location: Lima Region
- Coordinates: 11°07′36″S 76°32′7″W
- Basin countries: Peru
- Surface elevation: 4,370 m (14,340 ft)

Yanawayin (Quechua yana black, Ancash Quechua wayi house, "black house", -n a suffix, other spellings Yanahuain, Yanahuin, Yanahuni, Yanahuani) is a lake in the central Peruvian Andes. It lies in the Lima Region, Huaral Province, Andamarca District, near the village of Yanawayin (Yanahuain). The lake is situated at an altitude of about 4,370 m (14,340 ft).

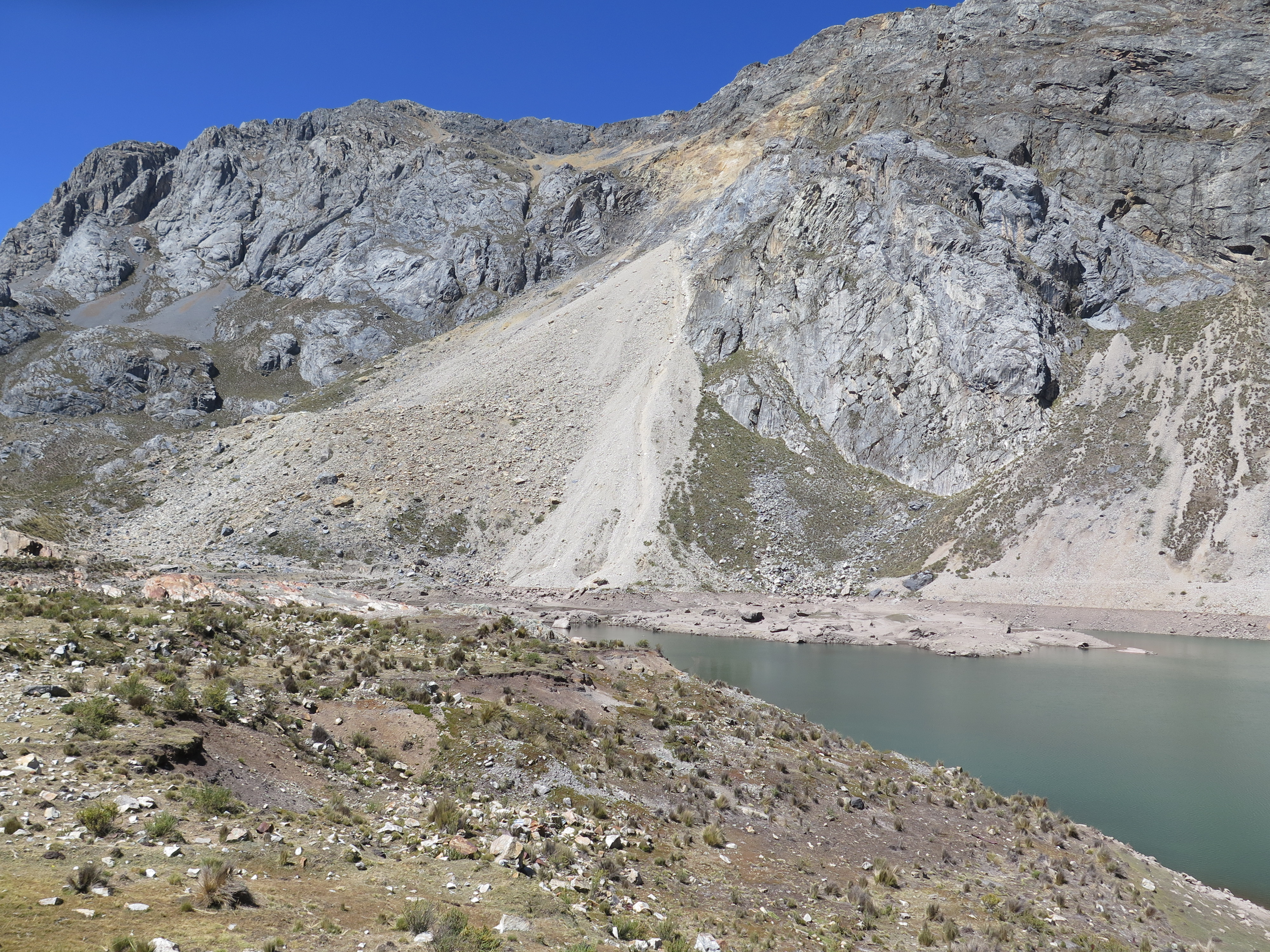
Yanawayin Lake and the landslide that destroyed most of the Chungar Mine camp in 1971. Picture looking E

== Landslide ==
The site made world headlines in 1971 when on March 18 a rock avalanche of 100,000 cubic metres (3,500,000 cu ft) fell from an outcrop of jointed limestone about 400 metres (1,300 ft) above the lake. It created a wave of 30 metres (98 ft) that destroyed the Chungar Mine camp on the shore, owned by the Mining Company (Cia Minera Chungar, S.A.), destroyed all the mines' surface facilities, and killed 200–600 miners.

== See also ==
- Willkaqucha
