= Los Azules mine =

Los Azules
- Location: San Juan Province, Argentina
- Products: copper

Los Azules is a large copper deposit located in the north-west of Argentina, in the San Juan Province. Los Azules represents one of the largest copper deposits in Argentina and in the world, with 0.96 billion tonnes of ore grading 0.48% copper for 10.2 billion copper pounds of indicated resource and 2.67 billion tonnes of ore grading 0.33% copper for 19.3 billion copper pounds of inferred resource.

In addition to the 29.3 billion pounds of copper, Los Azules has estimated resources of 251.3 million pounds of molybdenum, 191.1 million ounces of silver and 5.5 million ounces of gold.

Los Azules was acquired by McEwen Mining in 2012 and is held in McEwen Copper from 2021. The company is advancing the project from the preliminary economic assessment to the pre-feasibility study level.
