= Morelos mine =

Gold mine in Mexico

- Location: Guerrero, Mexico
- Products: Gold
- Company: Torex Gold Resources

The Morelos mine is one of the largest gold mines in Mexico. The mine is located in the south of the country in Guerrero and has estimated reserves of 3.07 million ounces of gold.
