= El Creston mine =

Mine in Mexico

- Location: Sonora, Mexico
- Products: Molybdenum

The El Creston mine is a large molybdenum mine in the north-west of Mexico in Sonora. El Creston represents one of the largest molybdenum reserves in Mexico and in the world having estimated reserves of 215.4 million tonnes of ore grading 0.071% molybdenum.
