= Salar de Olaroz mine =

Lithium mine in Jujuy, Argentina

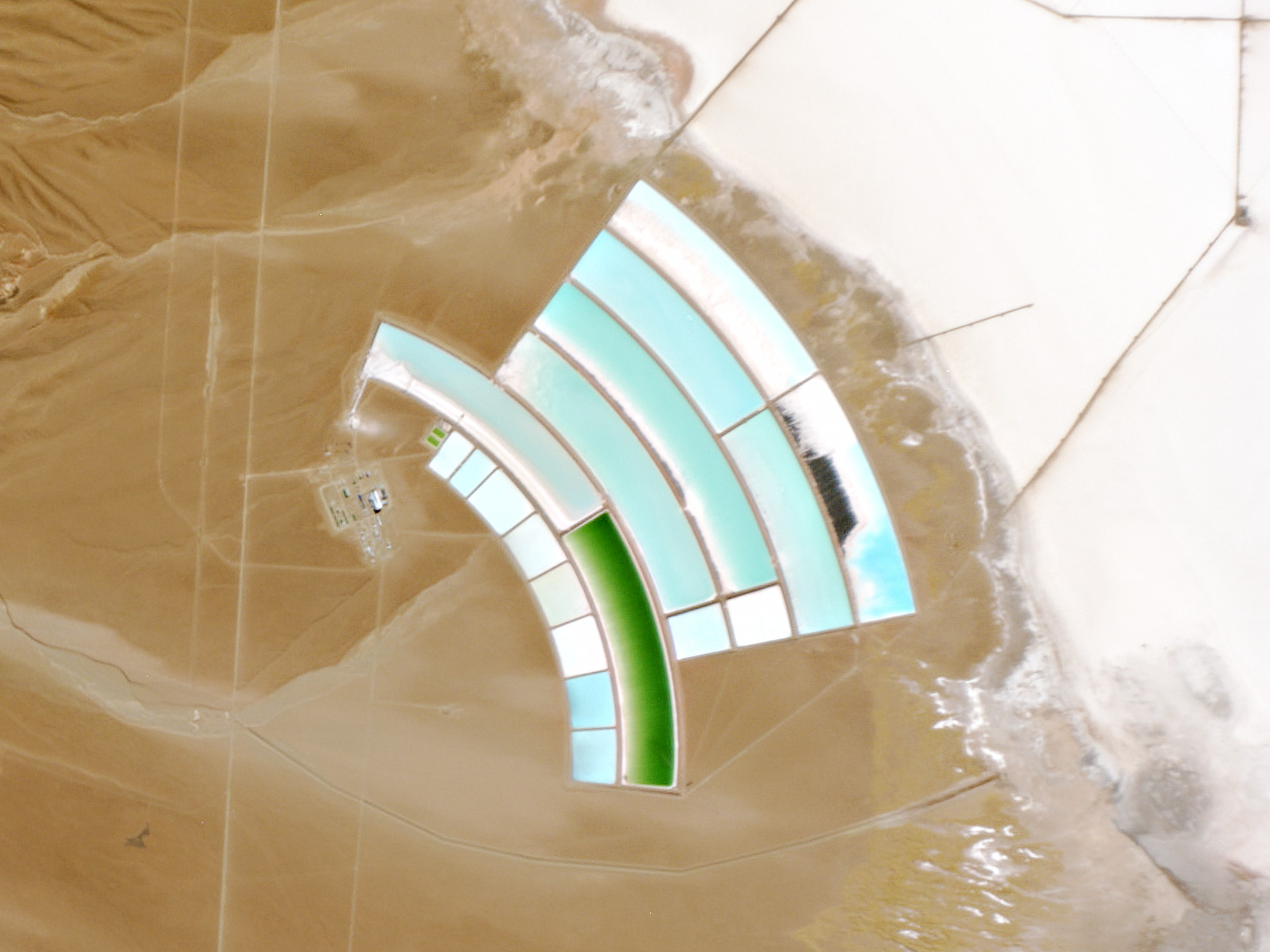

- Location within Argentina
- Location: Jujuy Province, Argentina; 23.4747°S 66.6658°W
- Products: Lithium

The Salar de Olaroz mine is one of the largest lithium mines in Argentina. The mine is located in northern Argentina in Jujuy Province. The Salar de Olaroz mine has reserves amounting to 619 million tonnes of lithium ore grading 0.2% lithium thus resulting 1.21 million tonnes of lithium.

== See also ==
- Mining in Argentina
