= Camino Rojo mine =

Silver mine in Mexico

- Location: Zacatecas, Mexico
- Products: Silver
- Company: Goldcorp

The Camino Rojo mine is one of the largest silver mines in Mexico and in the world. The mine is located in the center of the country in Zacatecas. The mine has estimated reserves of 1.63 million oz of gold and 32.07 million oz of silver.
