= Molango mine =

Manganese mine in Mexico

- Location: Hidalgo, Mexico
- Products: Manganese

The Molango mine is a mine located in the center of Mexico in Hidalgo. Molango represents one of the largest manganese reserve in Mexico having estimated reserves of 1.53 billion tonnes of manganese ore grading 25% manganese metal.
