= San Vicente mine =

Silver mine in Potosí, Bolivia

- Location: Potosí Department, Bolivia
- Products: silver

The San Vicente mine is one of the largest silver mines in Bolivia. Located in Potosí Department, San Vicente contains an estimated 36.1 million ounces of silver.
