= Navidad mine =

Silver mine in Chubut, Argentina

- Location: Chubut Province, Argentina
- Products: silver

The Navidad mine is a large silver mine located in the south of Argentina in Chubut Province. Navidad represents one of the largest silver reserve in Argentina and in the world having estimated reserves of 631.2 million oz of silver.

== See also ==
- Mining in Argentina
