= Eslām Chūngar =

- Location in Afghanistan
- Coordinates: 37°17′59″N 66°26′58″E
- Country: Afghanistan
- Province: Jowzjan Province
- Elevation: 1,210 ft (370 m)
- Time zone: UTC+4:30

Eslām Chūngar (also known as Islam Chomgar) is a small town in the province of Jowzjan, northern Afghanistan.

Eslām Chūngar is located on the southern banks of the river Amu Darya which forms the borderline with Turkmenistan here. The town is situated at an elevation of 370 m, 100 km north-east of Sheberghan, the province capital, and 100 km north-west of Mazār-i Sharīf. Its population is less than 5,000.
