= La Colorada mine =

Silver mine in Sonora, Mexico

- Location: Sonora, Mexico
- Products: silver

The La Colorada mine is a large silver mine located in the west of Mexico in Sonora. La Colorada represents one of the largest silver reserve in Mexico and in the world having estimated reserves of 64.1 million oz of silver.

== See also ==
- List of mines in Mexico
