= Clayton Valley =

Valley in Nevada, United States

- Location within Nevada
- Floor elevation: 1,300 m (4,300 ft)

Geography
- Population centers: Silver Peak, Nevada
- Coordinates: 37°44′37″N 117°35′27″W
- Topo map: Alcatraz Island
- Interactive map of Clayton Valley

Clayton Valley is a valley in the U.S. state of Nevada.

The Silver Peak Range is located west of the valley. The town of Silver Peak, Nevada is located in the valley.

Clayton Valley was named after Joshua E. Clayton, an early settler and mining engineer.
