= Manantial Espejo mine =

Coordinates: 48.7667°S 69.5000°W

- Interactive map of Manantial Espejo mine
- Location: Santa Cruz Province, Argentina
- Products: silver

The Manantial Espejo mine is a large silver mine located in Deseado Massif in Santa Cruz Province, southern Patagonia. Manantial Espejo represents one of the largest silver reserve in Argentina and in the world having estimated reserves of 25.7 million oz of silver.

== See also ==
- Mining in Argentina
