= Volcan (mining company) =

Peruvian Mining company

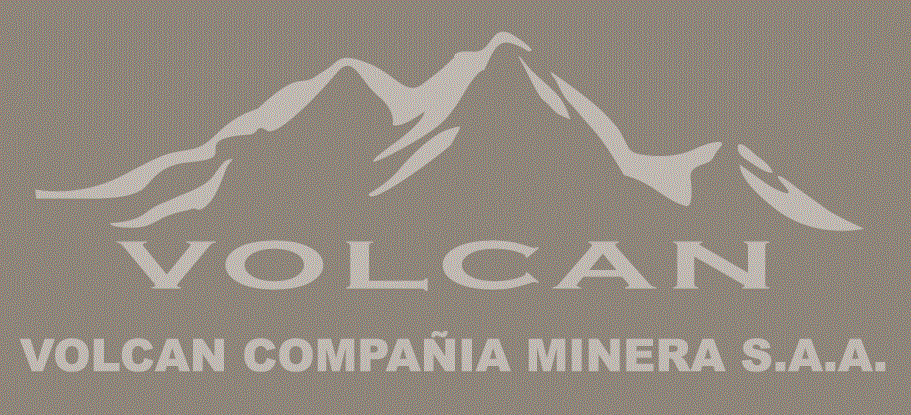
- Type: Public
- Traded as: BVL: VOLCAAC1; BMAD: XVOLB
- Industry: Mining
- Founded: (1943)
- Headquarters: Peru
- Key people: José Picasso Salinas (Chairman); Juan José Herrera Távara (CEO); José Luis Manzano (Owner)
- Revenue: ▲US$ 353 Million (2010)
- Website: www.volcan.com.pe

Volcan Compañía Minera S.A.A. is a Peruvian mining company.

Volcan was founded in 1943. Today, it is mostly engaged in the exploitation of silver, zinc, copper and lead, but also operates hydroelectric power plants.

The company is owned by Argentine businessman José Luis Manzano, who purchased a majority stake in Volcan in May 2024.
