= Huaral (disambiguation) =

Huaral can refer to a city, a district and a province in Peru.

For the use of the term in a specific setting, see:

- Huaral for the town in Peru.
- Huaral District for the district in the Huaral province.
- Huaral Province for the province in the Lima region.
