= Pacaraos Quechua =

Language in the Quechua family

- Native to: Peru
- Region: Pacaraos District
- Native speakers: (35 cited 1993)
- Language family: Quechua: Central Quechua; Pacaraos Quechua

Language codes
- ISO 639-3: qvp
- Glottolog: paca1245
- ELP: Pacaraos Quechua
- Linguasphere: 84-FAA-fbc

Pacaraos Quechua is a variety of Quechua spoken until the middle of the 20th century in the community of Pacaraos (Pacaraos District) in the Peruvian Lima Region in the Chancay valley up to 3000 m above sea level.

== Classification ==
A peculiarity of Pacaraos Quechua is that it does not belong to any of the two main branches of the Quechua family (Waywash and Wampuy). In contrast to other Quechua varieties, the Quechua of Pacaraos has phonemic word accent, which is either on the penultimate or the ultimate syllable. Like the Waywash varieties but in contrast to Wampuy, it distinguishes between short and long vowels.

== History ==
The Quechua of Pacaraos was investigated by the Dutch linguist Willem F. H. Adelaar in the 1970s, when it was still spoken by women in their sixties and older. Around the year 2000 there were possibly no active speakers left, but there are probably some people with passive knowledge who grew up with their grandparents.

== Phonology ==
The /q/ of Proto-Quechua is a fricative, at the end of a syllable or near a voiceless consonant it is voiceless [x] and otherwise voiced [g]. In contrast to other Quechua varianties it distinguishes between a simple [r] (tap, e.g. rapqan "they both") and a vibrant [rr] (e.g. rraqak "girl"). As in some dialects of Ancash Quechua /č/ has become [s] (e.g. say "that") and /s/ has turned to [h] (e.g. huti "name", haĉa "plant", rrahu "snow"). The retroflex /ĉ/ has been preserved.

== Grammar ==
The first person of the verb and the possessive form for nouns is expressed by accent on the last syllable and addition of -y, e.g.: tarpuy "to sow" (root: tarpu-) - tarpú "I sow" (cf. Waywash: tarpuu, Wampuy: tarpuni) - tarpunki "you sow" - tarpun "he/she sows".

Pacaraos Quechua shares many suffixes with Waywash, e.g. -ĉaw "in, on, at" or -piqta, -piq "from, out of". The accusative suffix -kta has a long form -kta and a short form -k, the latter being combined with final stress. The negation suffix -su (<*-chu) is often shortened to -s.

The gerund is expressed with -shpa, as in all Wampuy varieties.

== Vocabulary ==
The vocabulary of Pacaraos Quechua corresponds in part with Southern Quechua (e.g. kunan "now"), and partially with Waywash (e.g. yarku- "to rise", akshu, "potato"). Furthermore there are many loanwords from Jaqaru or other Aymaran languages (e.g. achara "old", uni- "to hate", wilka "sun"). Some words of Pacaraos Quechua are unique, e.g. arapu- "to answer", chaqpa "clothes", rapqa- "both".

== Bibliography ==
- Adelaar, Willem (1986). Morfología del Quechua de Pacaraos. Lima: Universidad Nacional Mayor de San Marcos.
- Adelaar, Willem (2004). "The Inca Sphere: A sketch of a Peruvian Quechua Dialect (Pacaraos)". The Languages of the Andes. Cambridge Language Surveys. With the collaboration of Pieter C. Muysken. Cambridge University Press. pp. 242–249. doi:10.1017/CBO9780511486852.005. ISBN 978-0-521-36831-5.
