= San Miguel de Acos District =

Coordinates: 8°22′1.2″S 77°39′0″W

San Miguel de Acos
- District
- Interactive map of San Miguel de Acos
- Country: Peru
- Region: Lima
- Province: Huaral
- Founded: 31 December 1956
- Capital: Acos

Government
  - Mayor: Máximo Adrián Espinoza Arroyo

Area
  - Total: 48.16 km^{2} (18.59 sq mi)
- Elevation: 1,576 m (5,171 ft)

Population (2017)
  - Total: 648
  - Density: 13.5/km^{2} (34.8/sq mi)
- Time zone: UTC-5 (PET)
- UBIGEO: 150609
- Website: www.muniacos.gob.pe

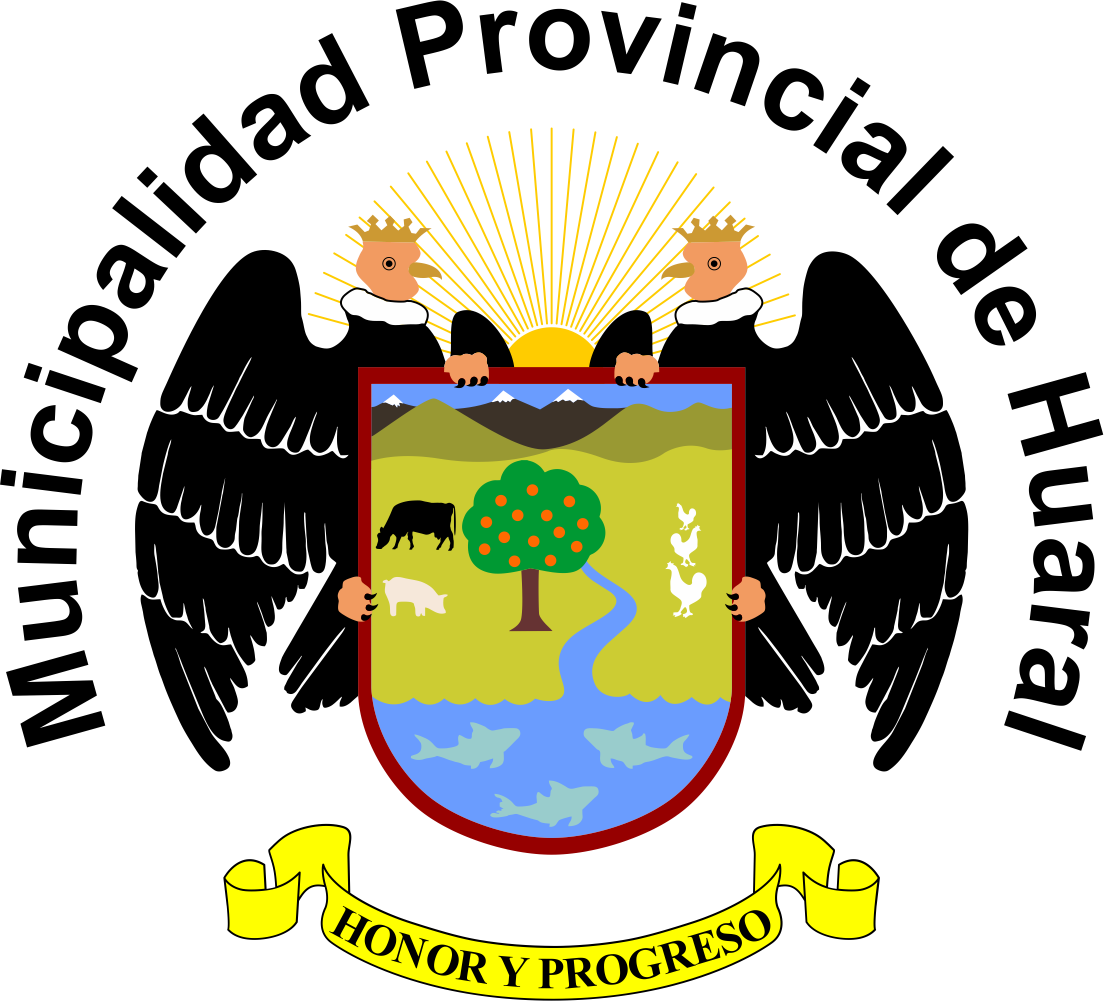
Coat of arms of the city and province of Huaral, Lima region, Peru.

San Miguel de Acos District is one of twelve districts of the province Huaral in Peru.

== History ==
The history of Acos, like other villages of Peru takes place in the Inca Empire. But then it appears as an urban village in the early 16th Century.

The year 1800 is when Acos becomes a town, and when Chinese arrived in Peru, Acos became a market.

Because of the law no. 12687 in Peru the San Miguel of Acos District was created. Since 11 May 1976, the district belongs to the Huaral Province.

== Capital ==
The capital of the district is Acos. The capital city of the district is located 68 km east from the city of Huaral and to the left is the Chancay River.

== Location and description ==
San Miguel of Acos has an altitude of 1,376 m. It belongs to the Yunga region where they harvest fruits like apples and peaches. From 1920 to 1950 the people harvested oranges, lemons and chirimoyas.

== Area ==
The area of the district is 48,16 km^{2}.

== Administrative division ==
=== Populated areas ===
- Urban
  - Acos, with 636 people.
  - Population Density : 15.29/km^{2}

=== Agricultural communities ===
The District of San Miguel de Acos has 3 communities:

- Acos: 2.139 hectares
- San Juan: 1.263 hectares
- Huascoy: 1.304 hectares

== See also ==
- Lima Region
