= Miss Perú 1986 =

Beauty pageant edition

- Date: May 25, 1986
- Presenters: Jorge Beleván, Silvia Maccera
- Venue: Teatro Municipal de Arequipa
- Broadcaster: Panamericana Televisión
- Entrants: 22
- Winner: Karin Lindeman; Piura

The Miss Perú 1986 pageant was held on May 25, 1986. That year, 22 candidates were competing for the national crown. The chosen winner represented Peru at the Miss Universe 1986. The rest of the finalists would enter in different pageants.

== Placements ==
Final Results	Contestant
Miss Peru Universe 1986	Piura - Karin Lindeman García
Miss World Peru 1986	Surco - Patricia Kuypers
Miss Peru Asia-Pacific 1986	Distrito Capital – Roxana Matute
1st Runner-Up	Tacna - María Dolores Martínez
2nd Runner-Up	San Isidro - Janet Ylbert
Top 10	Lambayeque - Milagros Boggiano Laca; Cuzco - Johana Farfán; Arequipa - Diana Zecevich; Ucayali - Edith Tapia; Amazonas - Asunta Ramos

== Special awards ==
- Best Regional Costume - Cuzco - Johana Farfán
- Miss Photogenic - Lambayeque - Milagros Boggiano Laca
- Miss Elegance - Cuzco - Johana Farfán
- Miss Body - Amazonas - Asunta Ramos
- Best Hair - Ucayali - Edith Tapia
- Miss Congeniality - Piura - Karin Lindermann
- Most Beautiful Face - Lambayeque - Milagros Boggiano Laca

.

== Delegates ==
- Amazonas - Asunta Ramos Tenorio
- Áncash - Cecilia Vidarte
- Arequipa - Diana Zecevich
- Camaná - María Amelia Carozzi
- Carabayllo - Valeria Pulgar Dextre
- Castilla - Patricia Lizarraga
- Chancay - Rosa María Fortunic
- Cuzco - Johana Farfán
- Distrito Capital - Roxana Matute
- La Libertad - Janet Botton
- La Molina - Vilma Torres
- La Union - Francis Sánchez Mendoza
- Lambayeque - Milagros Boggiano Laca
- Mollendo - Andrea Garces Villanueva
- Piura - Karin Lindermann
- Region Arequipa - Danitza Salas
- San Isidro - Janet Ylbert
- Surco - Patricia Kuypers
- Tacna - María Dolores Martínez
- Tumbes - Brenda Lindao
- Ucayali - Edith Tapia
- USA Peru - Catherine Garate

== Judges ==
- Luis Llosa Urquidi - Peruvian Movie Director
- Cusi Barrio - Peruvian TV series Director
- Robert Vaughn - American Actor
- Carlos Morales Andrade - Regional Manager of Aeroperu
- Nelly DeSamane - Designer at Boutique Jessica
- Eduardo Bonilla - Manager of Creaciones Sheila
- Teresa Ricketts - Miss Arequipa 1964
- Alfonso Pait - Manager of Beauty Form
- Liliana Valderrama - Manager of Paraiso
- José Antonio Caro - Owner Hotel José Antonio of Miraflores
- Eduardo Eguiluz Solari - President of Club de Leones of Arequipa
- Carlos García Bragagnini - Manager of Representaciones García Arequipa
- Clarita Santa Cruz - Sales Manager of Panamericana Televisión
- Fernando Herrera - Regional Manager of Panamericana Televisión

.

== Background Music ==
- Swimsuit Competition – Spyro Gyra — "Incognito"
- Evening Gown Competition - Spyro Gyra — "Sueño"

.
