= Carac =

Carac may refer to:

- Carac (pastry), a tart-like Swiss dessert pastry
- Carac (drug), a trade name for fluorouracil, an anti-cancer chemotherapy medication
- Cárac, Peru, capital of 27 de Noviembre District, Huaral, Peru

== See also ==
- Carrack, a sailing ship
- Karak (disambiguation)
