= Huaral =

City in Peru

Huaral San Juan Bautista de Huaral
- City
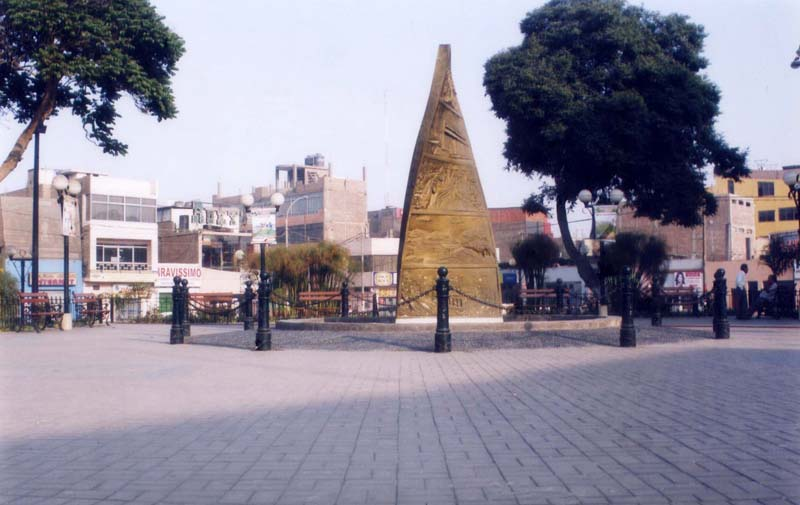
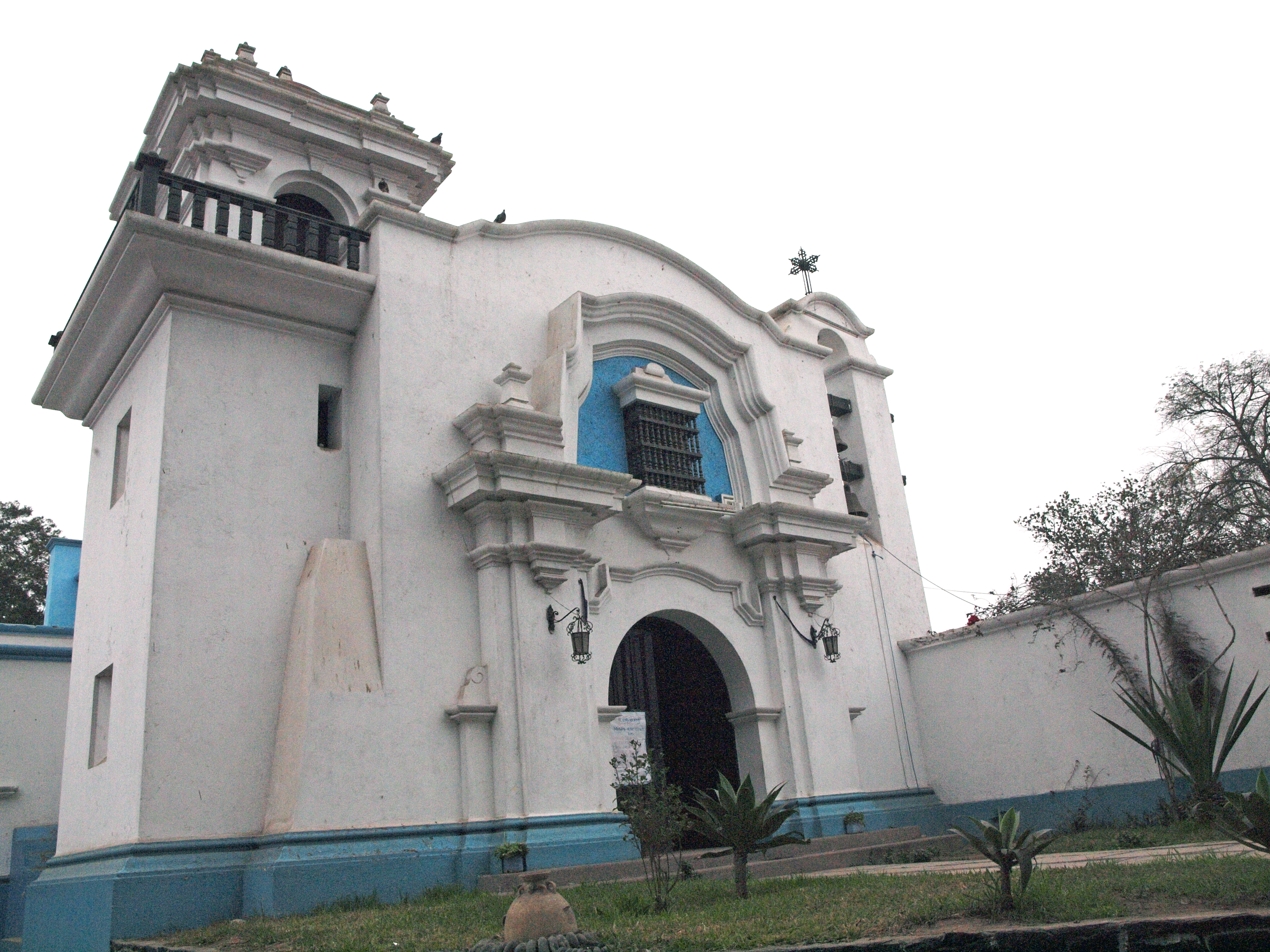
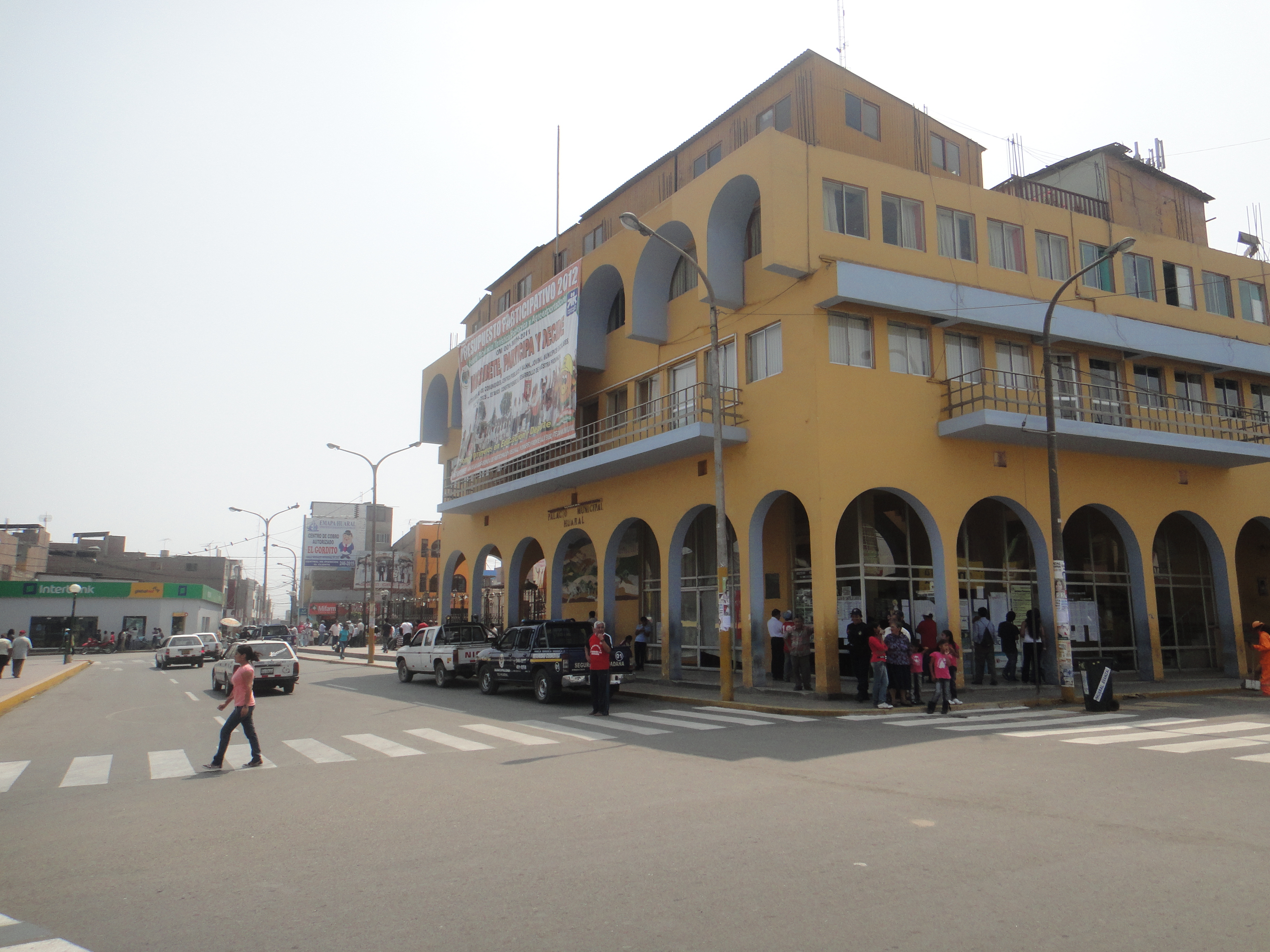
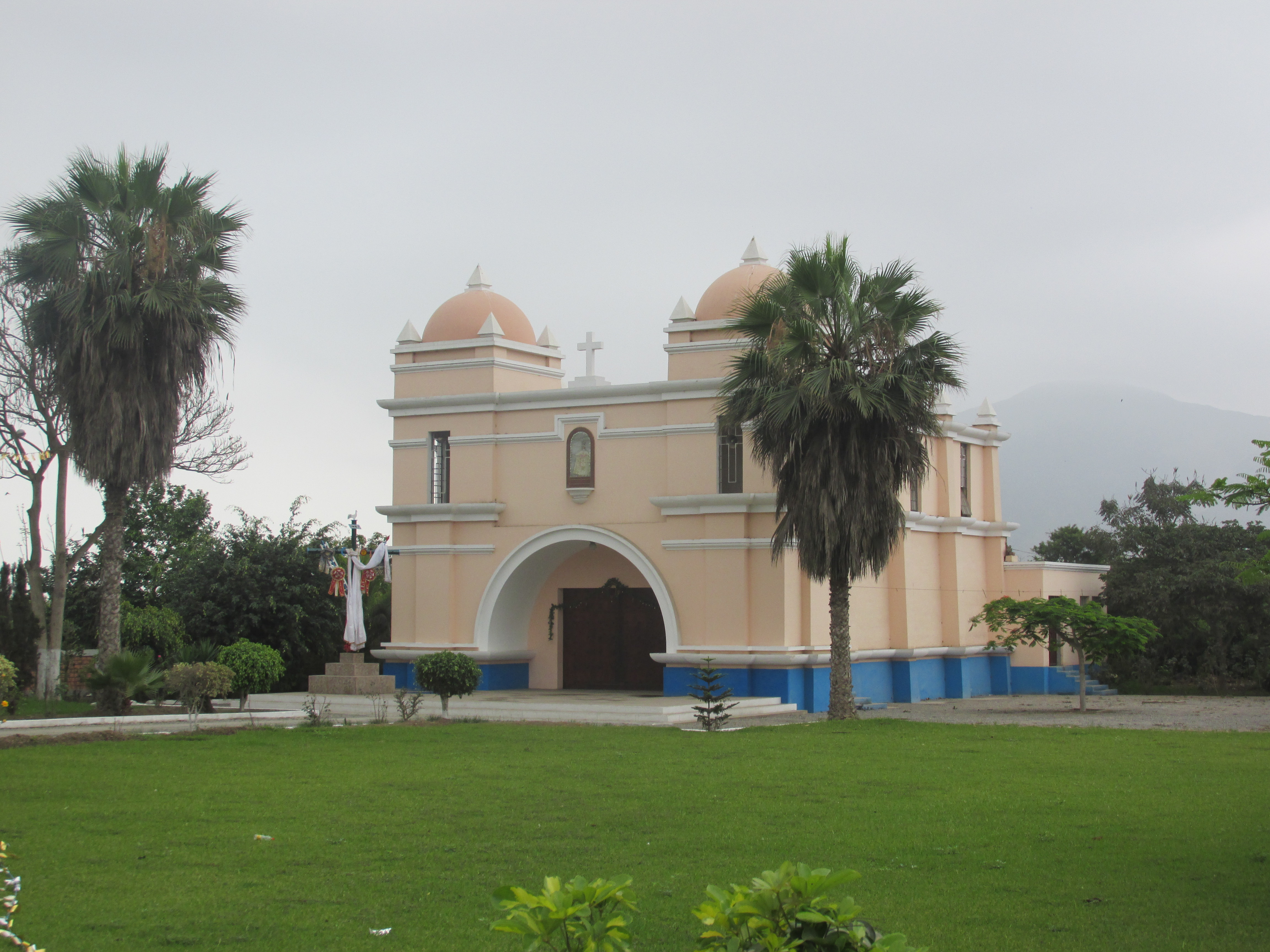
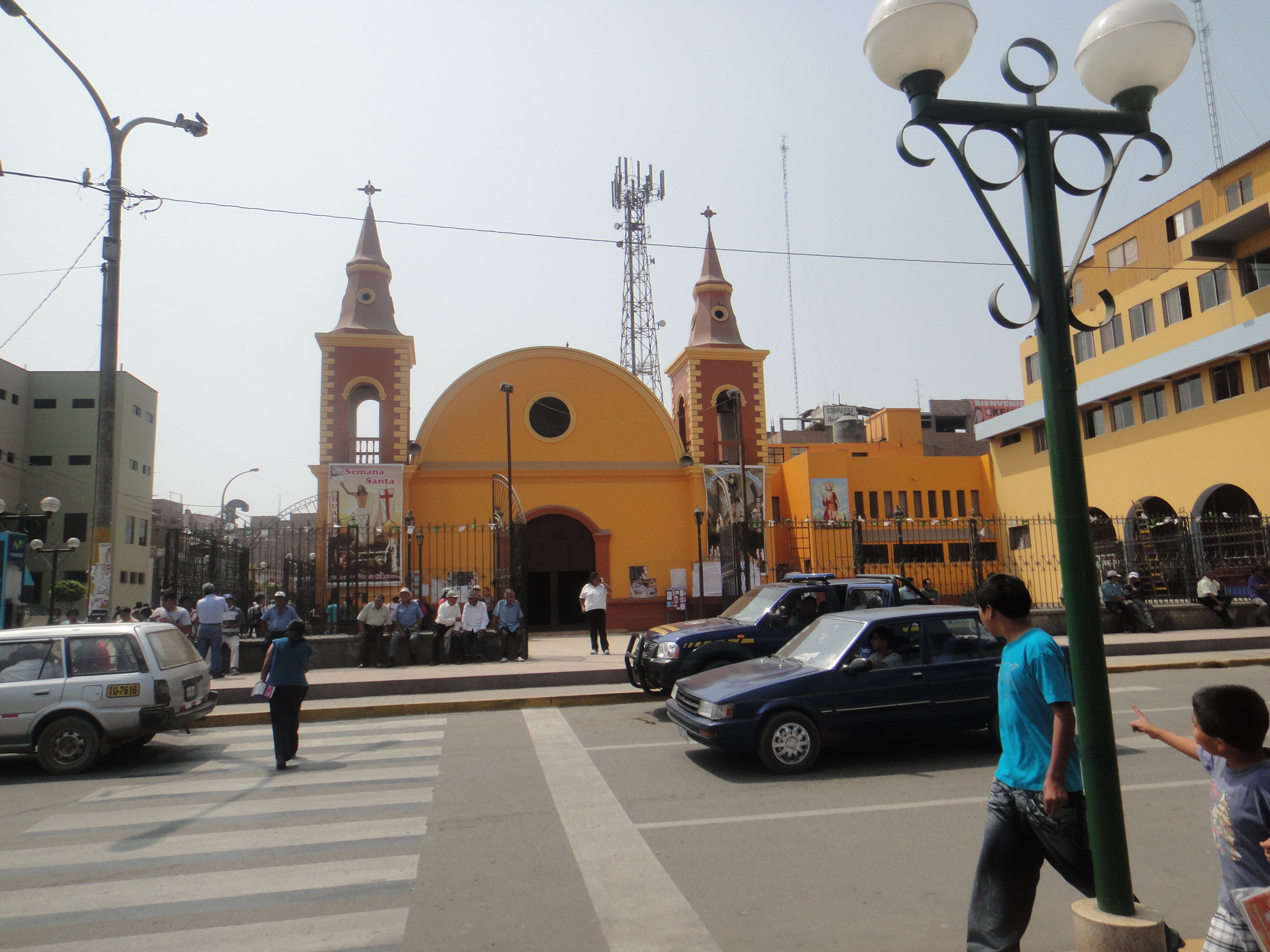
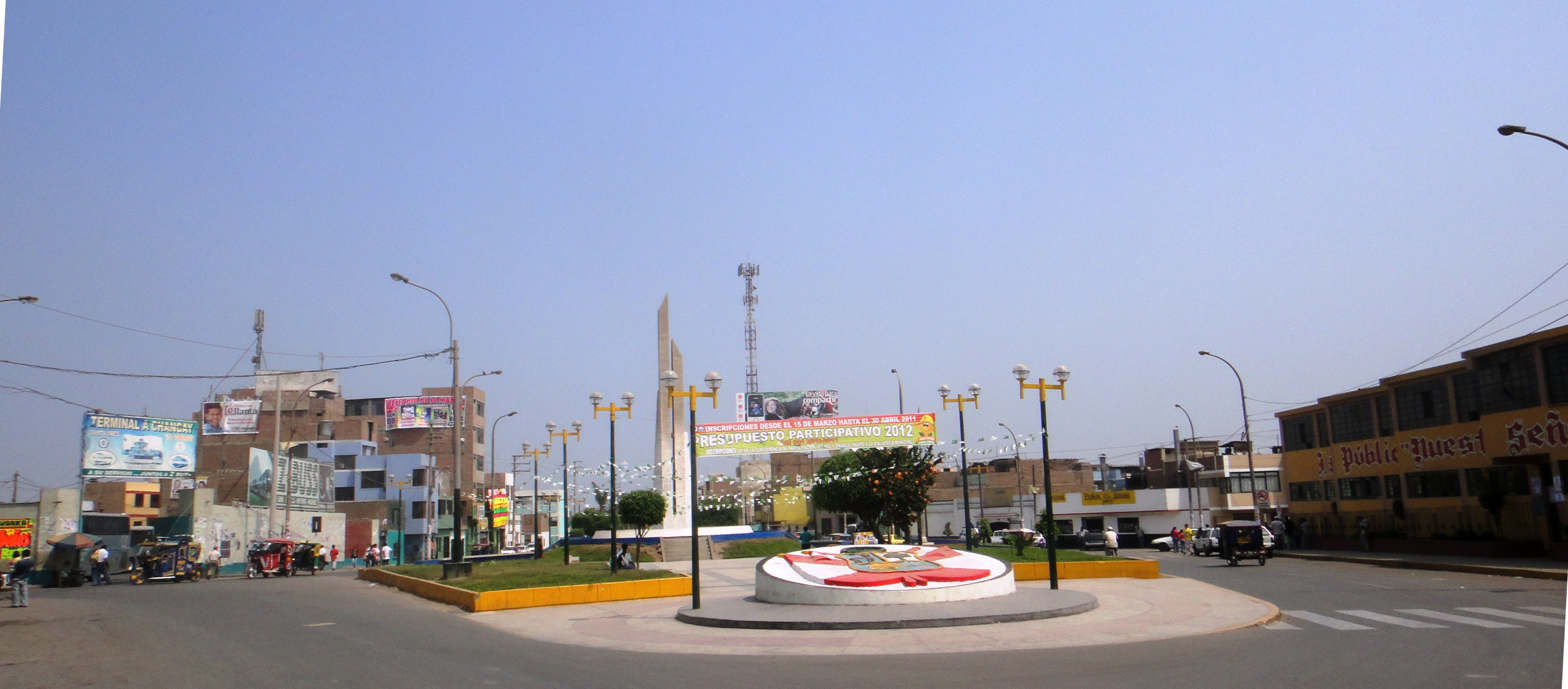
- From top to bottom and from left to right: The main square, the old Huando Hacienda, the municipal palace, the former Jesús del Valle hacienda, the San Juan Bautista Church and Centenario Square.

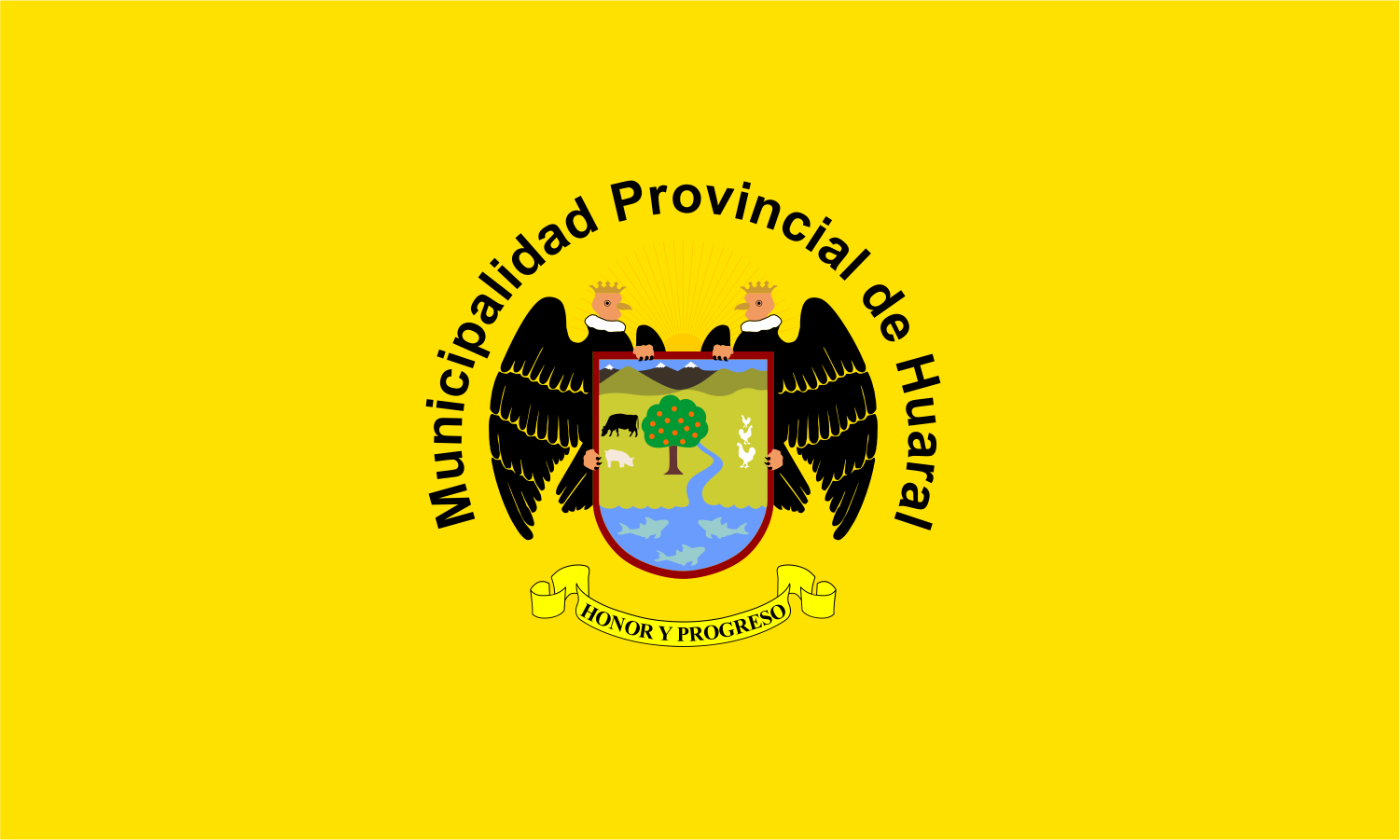
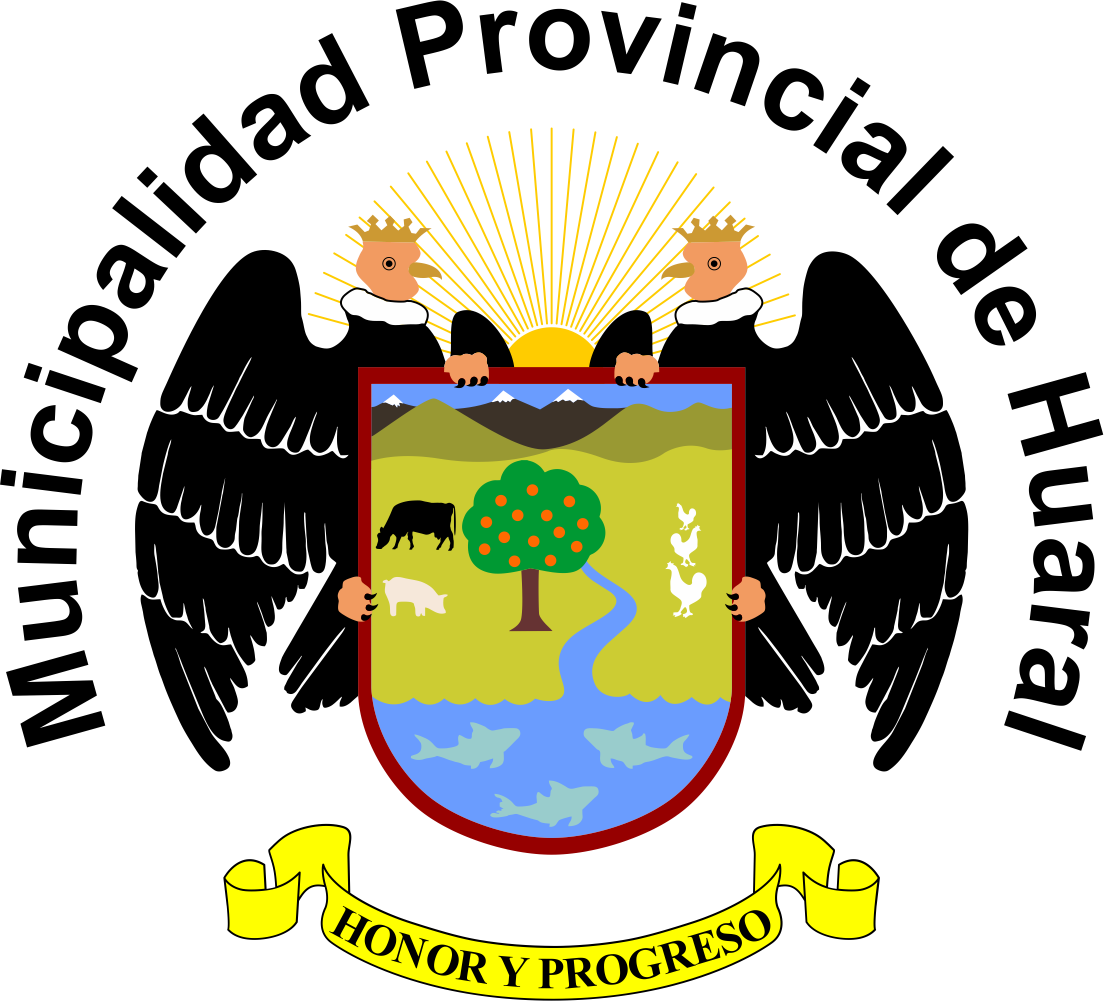
- Flag Coat of arms
- Nicknames: "Capital de la Agricultura" (Capital of the Agriculture), "Despensa de Lima" (Lime Pantry)
- Motto(s): Honor and Progress
- Anthem: Anthem of Huaral
- Location within Peru
- Coordinates: 11°30′S 77°12′W
- Country: Peru
- Region: Lima
- Province: Huaral
- District: Huaral
- Founded: 21 march 1551

Government
  - Type: Democracy
  - Mayor: Fernando José Cárdenas Sánchez (2023–2026)

Area
  - Total: 3,655.70 km^{2} (1,411.47 sq mi)
- Elevation: 188 m (617 ft)

Population (2017)
  - Total: 99,915
  - Density: 27.331/km^{2} (70.788/sq mi)
- Demonym: Huaralino/a
- Time zone: UTC-5 (PET)
- Area code: +1
- Website: www.munihuaral.gob.pe

Huaral (Spanish pronunciation: [ˈwɑːrəl]) is a city in Peru, capital of the Huaral Province in the Department of Lima. It is located within the jurisdiction of the Regional Government of Lima-Provinces and is located on the central coast of the country.

It is also known as the "Agricultural Capital" and "Lima's Pantry" due to the abundant produce of the surrounding valleys.

== Etymology ==
Regarding the origin of the word huaral, there are two hypotheses:

- The first corresponds to historian Jesus Elias Ipinze, who affirms that the word huaral, comes from the name of a main cacique of the town called Martín Guaral Paico, in the middle of the 16th century. From what it follows, guaral would have subsequently derived in huaral.
- The second hypothesis corresponds to archaeologist Julio C. Tello, who visited Huaral, for reasons of carrying out archaeological investigations. Tello affirms that the name of Huaral comes from the corruption of the Aymara words huaralí, huararo, huararí or huallalí.

== Geography ==
=== Location ===
Huaral is a geographical territory which lies north of the capital of Peru, located 80 km (50 mi) north of Lima, but starting its territory by the coast side at kilometer 58 of the North Panamerican Highway, in the middle of the "Pasamayo Serpentine".

The territory of the city includes the coastal strip comprising all the Chancay valley to the high peaks of Vichaycocha, the source of the Chackal or Pasacmayo "Moon River".

Huaral, like most of the country's coastal cities, has not been immune to the migratory process of settlers from the interior of Peru who, starting in the 1960s, began to arrive in our city to take over their surroundings, forming Young Towns, human settlements, populated centres, etc., many of which were born as a result of invasions, so we can say that the city of Huaral is located in the heart of the Chancay Valley, 8 kilometers from the right bank of the river, surrounded by greenery and hills.

=== Hydrography ===
The Chancay River Basin, located on the central coast of Peru, is one of the most important basins on the Pacific slope, which gives rise to the river of the same name. It flows into the Pacific Ocean, about 60 km north of Lima and about 6 km south of the district of Chancay. It originates at the confluence of the Vichaycocha River and the Chicrín River and receives, along its course, contributions from the tributary hydrographic units described below: the first contribution is from the Baños River hydrographic unit, described above in the upper part of the basin, later it receives contributions from the hydrographic units of the Carac, Añasmayo, Huataya and Orcón rivers.

=== Climate ===
In Huaral, the summers are hot, humid, arid, and overcast; the winters are long, comfortable, dry, and mostly clear. Over the course of the year, the temperature typically varies from 16 °C to 28 °C and is rarely below 14 °C or above 30 °C. Thus, Huaral has a temperate climate for nearly the entire year. The temperate season lasts for 3.0 months, from January 4 to April 5, when the average daily high temperature is above 26 °C. The warmest month of the year in Huaral is February, with an average high of 28 °C and low of 21 °C. The cool season lasts for 4.3 months, from June 9 to October 17, when the average daily high temperature is below 22 °C. The coldest month of the year in Huaral is August, with an average low of 16 °C and high of 20 °C. The amount of rainfall over a 31-day period in the city does not vary significantly throughout the year, remaining between 1 millimeter and 1 millimeter.

Climate data for Huaral (Donoso) (1991–2020 normals)
Month	Jan	Feb	Mar	Apr	May	Jun	Jul	Aug	Sep	Oct	Nov	Dec	Year
Mean daily maximum °C (°F)	26.5 (79.7)	27.4 (81.3)	27.0 (80.6)	24.8 (76.6)	22.4 (72.3)	20.2 (68.4)	18.9 (66.0)	18.7 (65.7)	19.5 (67.1)	20.7 (69.3)	22.3 (72.1)	24.3 (75.7)	22.7 (72.9)
Mean daily minimum °C (°F)	18.8 (65.8)	19.5 (67.1)	19.1 (66.4)	17.3 (63.1)	15.8 (60.4)	15.1 (59.2)	14.7 (58.5)	14.3 (57.7)	14.3 (57.7)	14.7 (58.5)	15.3 (59.5)	16.9 (62.4)	16.3 (61.4)
Average precipitation mm (inches)	1.1 (0.04)	2.2 (0.09)	1.8 (0.07)	0.3 (0.01)	0.8 (0.03)	3.5 (0.14)	3.9 (0.15)	5.0 (0.20)	2.3 (0.09)	0.7 (0.03)	0.5 (0.02)	0.8 (0.03)	22.9 (0.9)
Source: National Meteorology and Hydrology Service of Peru

== History ==
=== Chimu Empire ===
The city of Huaral was part of the Chimú Empire or Chimú Kingdom at its peak, which lasted from 1000 to 1470 years ago.

=== Pre-Hispanic phase ===
The Chancay Valley must have been one of the areas explored by hunter-gatherers during the Andean Lithic Period, who moved their habitats seasonally, descending to the coast. Coastal hills like those of Lachay would have been occupied temporarily during the season when their own vegetation and fauna thrive, sustained by the moisture coming from the ocean.

=== City foundation ===
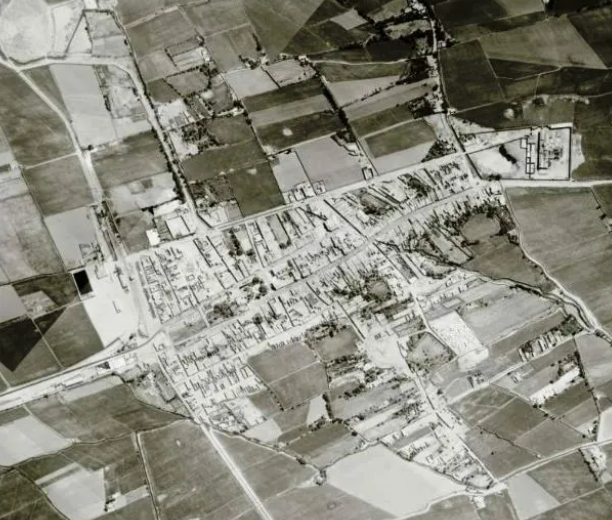
Aerial view of Huaral in 1945.

Before the arrival of the Spanish, the town was a community of ayllus, that the Spanish called "Guaral Viejo". Huaral was founded on March 21, 1551 by the Spanish, being Viceroy of Peru Antonio de Mendoza, as "Settlement of the Indies". By then, the name of the town was "San Juan de Guaral". After the establishment, its hegemony became more solid and dedicated from then to agriculture, achieving in the course of the colony commercial development. However, it was dependent as an annex of Chancay but as time passed, its natural progress placed the town in the capacity to become independent from Chancay, a situation that was recognized by President Remigio Morales Bermúdez who decrees the creation of San Juan de Huaral on October 31, 1890. Nevertheless, the installation of the first municipality took place on April 1, 1893, three years after the town's creation.

== Transport ==
Automobile traffic is minimal. Walking, bicycles, motorcycles and tricycle motor-taxis are common modes of transportation. There are two principal highways to enter Huaral, Pasamayo and its variant. A bus trip to or from Lima costs about one dollar (3.50 soles) There are many Inca archaeological sites and other historical sites all over the area.

== Religion ==
In the city, the predominant religion is Catholicism, primarily as a local custom inherited from Spanish culture. Within this community, there are various congregations professing the Christian faith, such as Evangelical, Methodist, Adventist, Baptist, and other churches. All of these congregations have their churches in different parts of the city.

== Archaeology ==
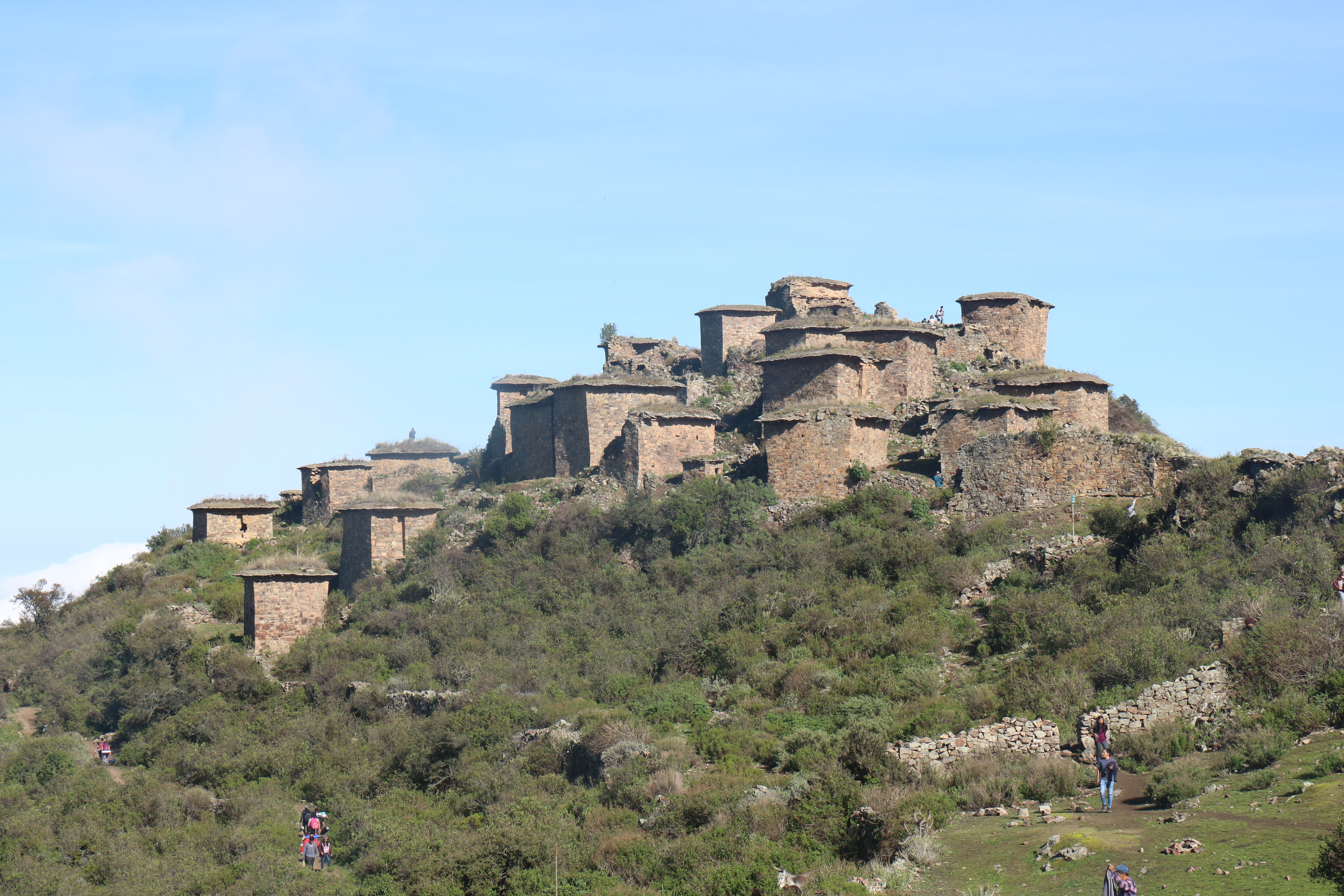
- Archaeological site of Rúpac.
  The Rúpac archaeological site, sometimes referred to as the "Machu Picchu of Lima," is located in the Atavillos Bajo district, within the province of Huaral, at 3,500 meters above sea level and 145 km from the city of Lima. The Rúpac Archaeological Complex was built by the Atavillos, one of the most important pre-Inca cultures in the province of Lima. Their purpose was to create a high-altitude defense system, which is why they dominated the mountaintops ranging from 3,500 to 3,800 meters above sea level.

== Sport and recreation ==
Soccer is one of the most played sports in the city. There are many soccer fields in the city, located in the various neighbourhoods. Basketball and volleyball are also played, especially popular among women.

=== Sports venues ===
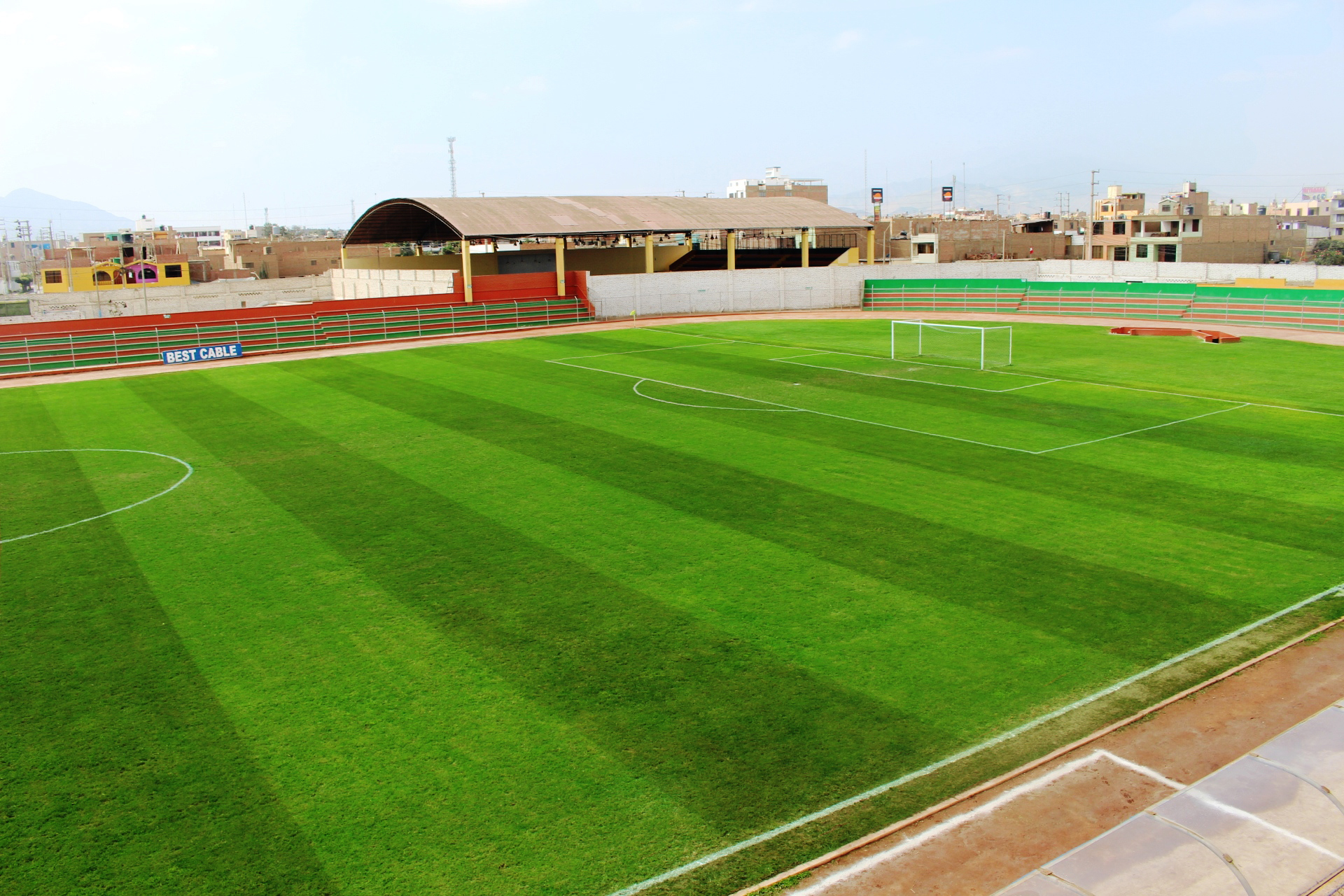
Eastern view of the Julio Lores Colán Stadium.

The Julio Lores Colan Stadium is the main site for soccer tournaments, where the city's local team plays. This stadium has a capacity for 5.692 people. It's called Julio Lores Colán and has hosted official events of the Peruvian Football League. There's also an indoor sports facility: the Coliseo Enclosed Campeones de Huaral, used primarily for volleyball and basketball.

=== Home team ===
As in all of Peru, soccer is the most popular sport in the city. The most traditional and beloved team of Huaral residents is Unión Huaral, which won the First Division twice, in 1976 and 1989. Among the provincial teams, Unión Huaral is one of the most emblematic. It has won two Peruvian soccer championships and has participated in the Copa Libertadores three times. Pedro Ruiz La Rosa, better known as "Pedrito Ruiz," is the idol of Unión Huaral, a club with which he won the 1976 national championship and a runner-up finish in 1974. Pedrito, one of Huaral's most beloved figures, also played for Defensor Lima, Sporting Cristal, and Juan Aurich, and was a Peruvian national team player.

== Gastronomy ==
Huaral, like other parts of Peru, has a gastronomy based on locally produced ingredients, offering dishes that are more than enough to delight. Its culinary offerings are based on high-quality ingredients and a cultural heritage that is a product of Huaral's fusion. The city's star dish is Chancho al palo, the most popular stew of all Huaralinos.

== Economy ==
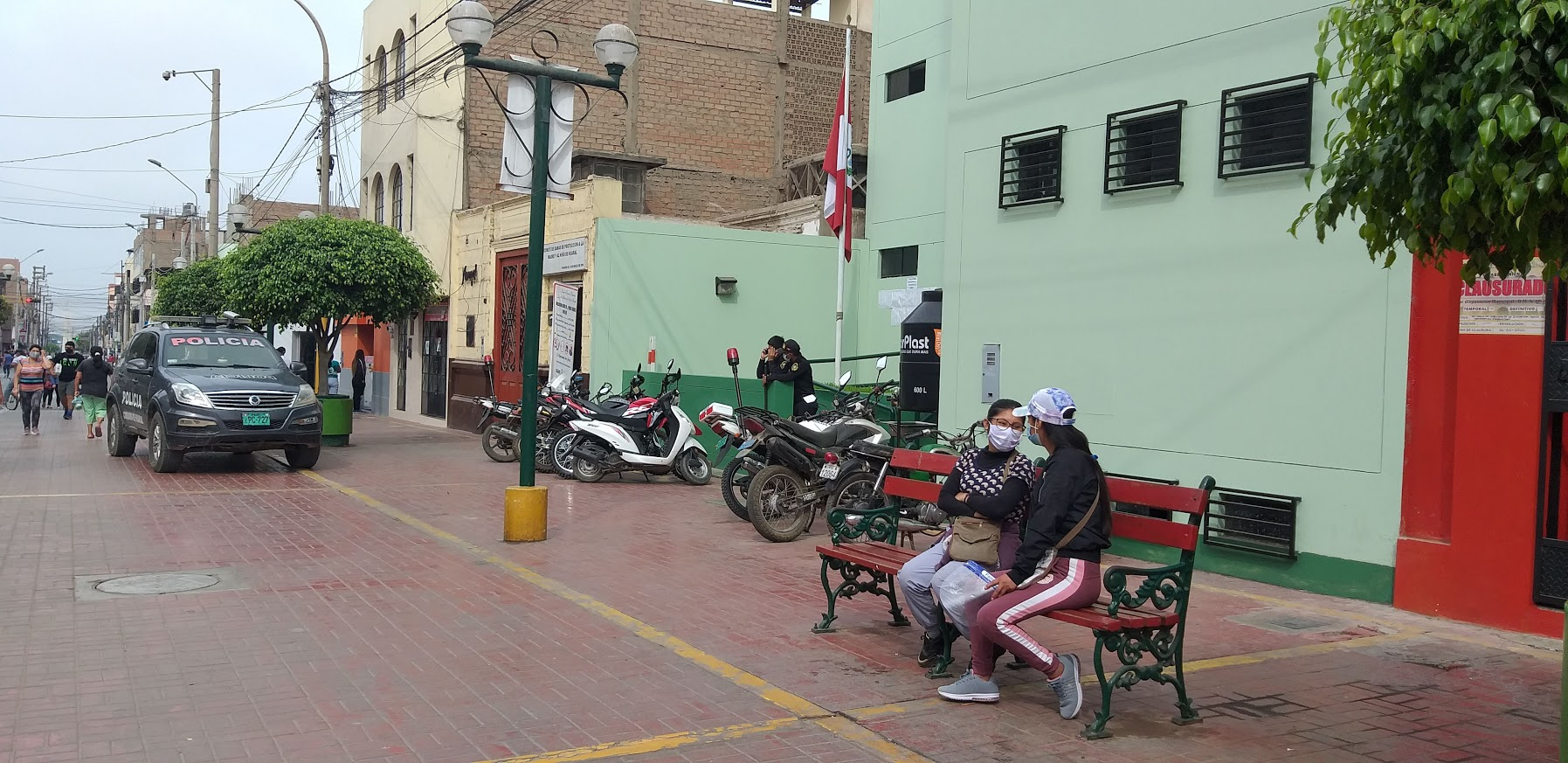
Boulevard del Solar, with a view of the city police station.

It has been considered one of Lima's food pantries for its large production of agricultural products for daily living. It was also known for the production of Huando oranges, on the farm of the same name, until the second half of the 20th century, as well as other fruit trees, such as grapes. It also produces cotton and sugarcane, as well as various tubers and wheat. Livestock farming includes cattle, horses, pigs, and sheep, depending on the area.

== See also ==
- Huaral district
- Huaral province
- Departament of Lima
- List of cities in Peru
