= Challwaqucha (Huaral) =

Lake in Peru

- Location within Peru
- Location: Peru; Lima Region, Huaral Province
- Coordinates: 11°02′33″S 76°33′20″W

Challwaqucha (Quechua challwa 'fish', qucha 'lake', "fish lake", hispanicized spelling Chalhuacocha) is a lake in Peru located in the Lima Region, Huaral Province, in the northeast of the Pacaraos District. It lies west of the lake named Warunqucha of the Pasco Region.
