= Sumbilca District =

Coordinates: 11°24′26″S 76°49′11″W

Sumbilca
- District
- Interactive map of Sumbilca
- Country: Peru
- Region: Lima
- Province: Huaral
- Founded: November 6, 1903
- Capital: Sumbilca

Government
  - Mayor: Victor Raul Espinoza Rondon

Area
  - Total: 259.38 km^{2} (100.15 sq mi)
- Elevation: 3,325 m (10,909 ft)

Population (2017)
  - Total: 720
  - Density: 2.8/km^{2} (7.2/sq mi)
- Time zone: UTC-5 (PET)
- UBIGEO: 150611

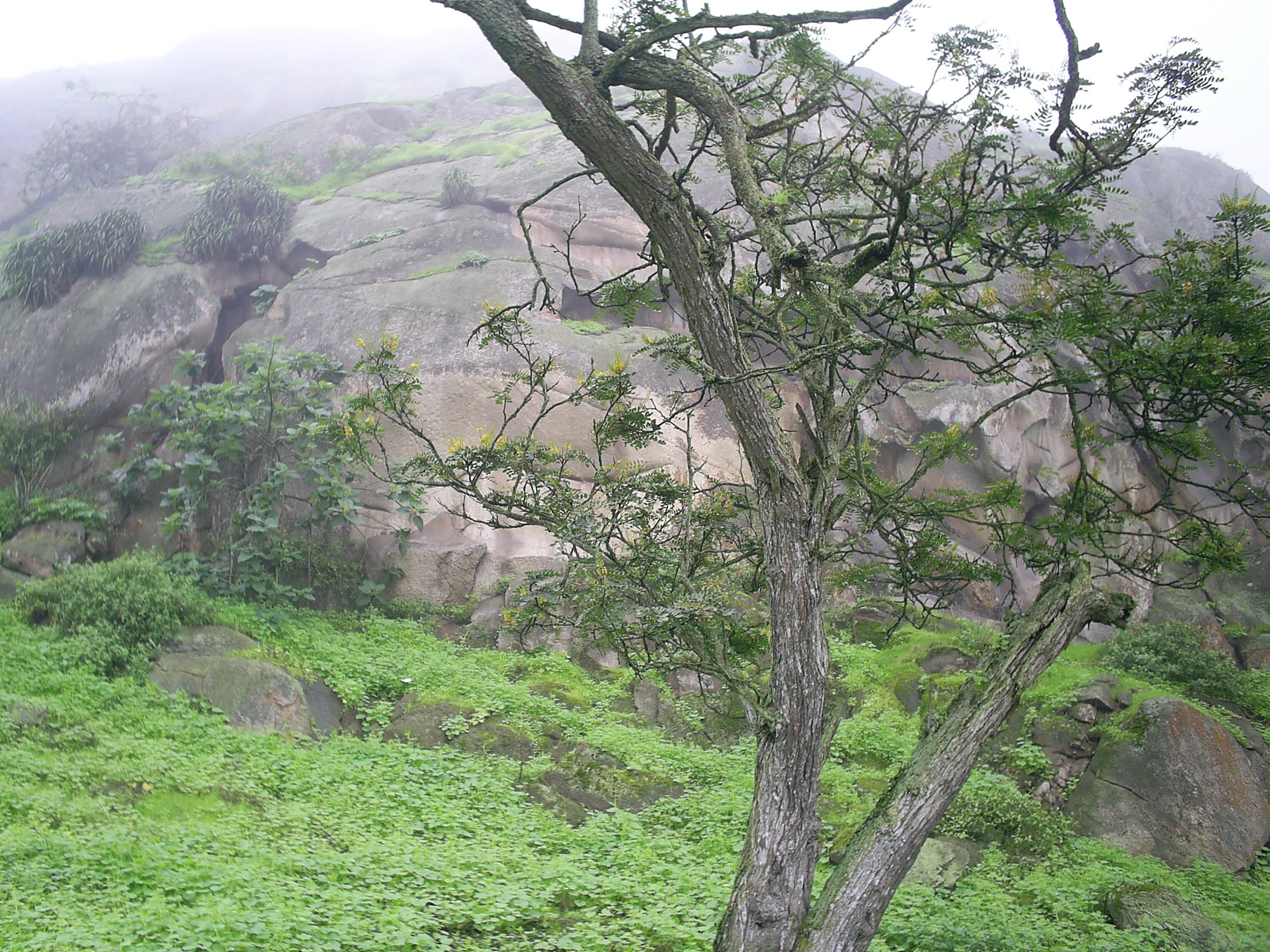

Sumbilca District is one of twelve districts of the province Huaral in Peru.
