= Pacaraos District =

Coordinates: 11°11′10″S 76°38′53″W

Pacaraos
- District
- Interactive map of Pacaraos
- Country: Peru
- Region: Lima
- Province: Huaral
- Capital: Pacaraos

Government
  - Mayor: Doroteo Jacinto Larios Fabian

Area
  - Total: 294.04 km^{2} (113.53 sq mi)
- Elevation: 3,331 m (10,928 ft)

Population (2017)
  - Total: 1,028
  - Density: 3.496/km^{2} (9.055/sq mi)
- Time zone: UTC-5 (PET)
- UBIGEO: 150608

Pacaraos District is one of twelve districts of the province Huaral in Peru.

Until the middle of the 20th century the inhabitants of the village of Pacaraos spoke Pacaraos Quechua.

== See also ==
- Challwaqucha
- Pirwa Hirka
- Yana Uqhu
