= Ihuari District =

Coordinates: 11°11′20″S 76°57′06″W

Ihuari
- District
- Interactive map of Ihuari
- Country: Peru
- Region: Lima
- Province: Huaral
- Capital: Ihuari

Government
  - Mayor: Felix Hernan Choque Jacobo

Area
  - Total: 467.67 km^{2} (180.57 sq mi)
- Elevation: 2,822 m (9,259 ft)

Population (2017)
  - Total: 2,037
  - Density: 4.356/km^{2} (11.28/sq mi)
- Time zone: UTC-5 (PET)
- UBIGEO: 150606

Ihuari District is one of twelve districts of the province Huaral in Peru.
