= Yana Uqhu (Huaral-Huaura) =

Mountain in Peru

- Location within Peru

Highest point
- Elevation: 5,000 m (16,000 ft)
- Coordinates: 11°03′08″S 76°40′00″W

Geography
- Location: Peru, Lima Region, Huaral Province, Huaura Province
- Parent range: Andes

Yana Uqhu (Quechua yana black, uqhu swamp, "black swamp", Hispanicized spelling Yanaocco) is a mountain in the Andes of Peru, about 5,000 metres (16,404 ft) high. It is located in the Lima Region, Huaral Province, Pacaraos District, and in the Huaura Province, Santa Leonor District.
