= Huaral District =

Coordinates: 11°30′00″S 77°12′36″W

Huaral Wahrahl
- District
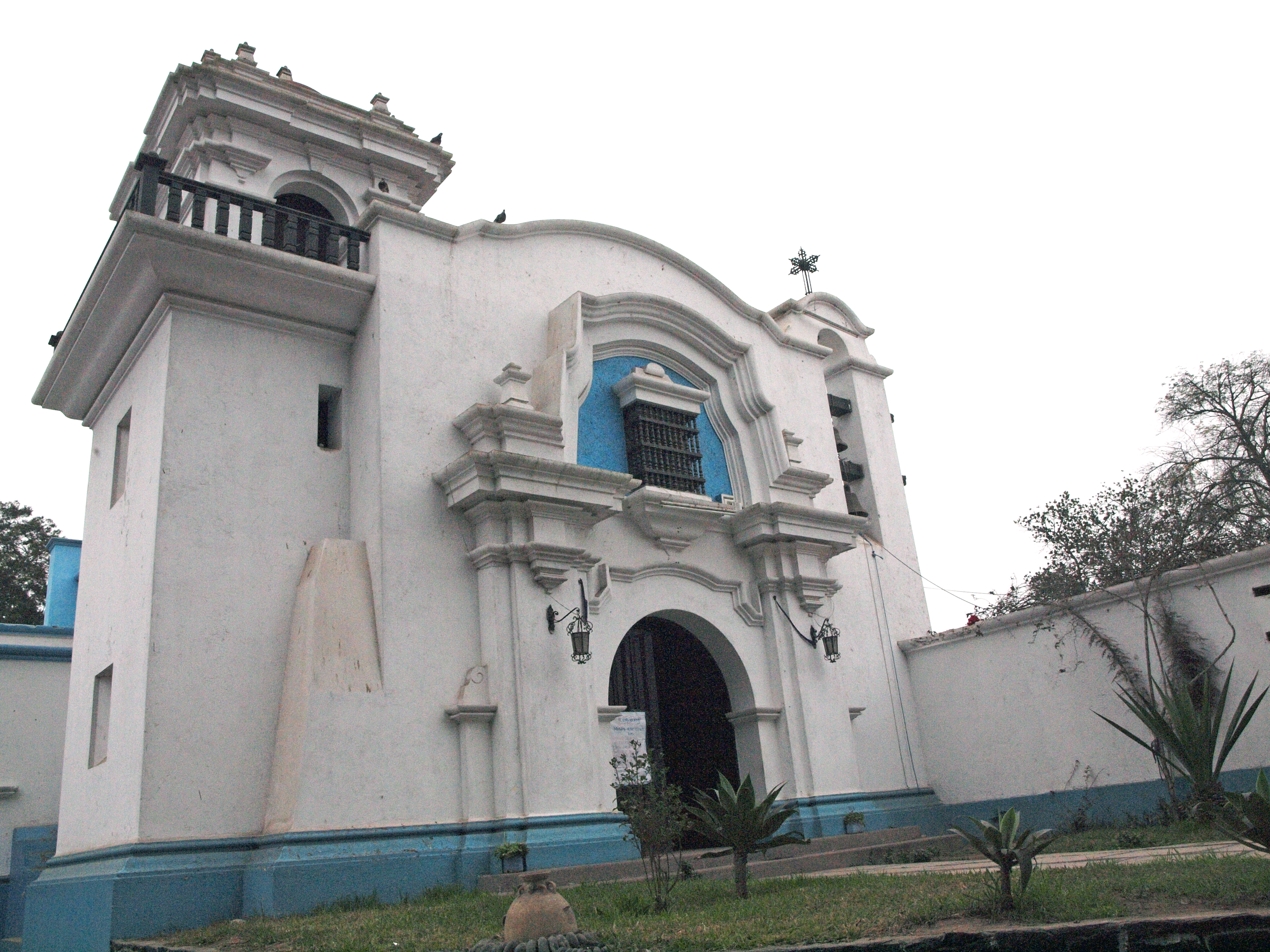
- Chapel of the Virgin of the Immaculate Conception in the old Hacienda Huando.
- Interactive map of Huaral
- Country: Peru
- Region: Lima
- Province: Huaral
- Founded: 31 October 1890
- Capital: Huaral

Government
  - Mayor: Fernando José Cárdenas Sánchez (2023-2026)

Area
  - Total: 665.57 km^{2} (256.98 sq mi)
- Elevation: 188 m (617 ft)

Population (2017)
  - Total: 99,915
  - Density: 150.12/km^{2} (388.81/sq mi)
- Time zone: UTC-5 (PET)
- UBIGEO: 150601
- Website: munihuaral.gob.pe

Huaral District is one of the twelve that make up the province of the same name in Peru.

Huaral is very agricultural, and it is surrounded by hundreds of farm fields. Including its famous Huando oranges. Thus Huaral is also called "Capital of Agriculture".

== History ==
Within the jurisdiction of Chancay Province, the Chancay District was created by law of January 2, 1857, by the government of President Ramón Castilla, also the seat of the provincial capital. Huaral was annexed to this district.

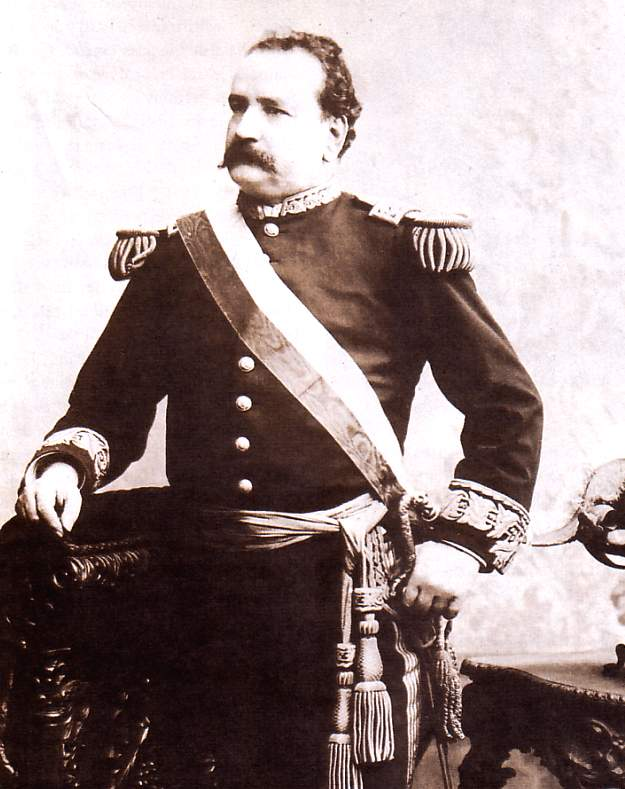
Remigio Morales Bermudez decreed the founding of San Juan de Huaral on October 31, 1890.

The growth of Huaral motivated the valley's landowners, especially the Del Solar brothers, to see the need to grant administrative independence to this sector, an annex to the Chancay District, also the seat of the provincial capital of the same name. To this end, these brothers, through their father, Pedro Alejandrino del Solar, then Vice President of the Republic, sought the creation of the Huaral District. This was finalized on October 31, 1890, during the administration of President Remigio Morales Bermúdez.

Many years later, on May 11, 1976, through Law No. 21488 creating the province of Huaral, signed by President Francisco Morales Bermúdez, it became part of the newly created province.

== Geography ==
A district in the Peruvian department of Lima. It covers an area of 665.57 km square. It starts at the Peruvian coast and continues up to the Andes. Its capital is a small city located 78 km (48 mi) north of Lima, Peru (300m above sea level).

The population is about 160,000. The climate is warm in the coastal regions and cools toward the 4,500 m (14,763 ft) mountains.

== Transport ==
Automobile traffic is minimal. Walking, bicycles, motorcycles and tricycle motor-taxis are common modes of transportation. There are two principal highways to enter Huaral, Pasamayo and its variant. A bus trip to or from Lima costs about one dollar (3.50 soles) There are many Inca archaeological sites and other historical sites all over the area.

== Capital ==
The capital of the Huaral district and province is the city of the same name. It is located at 117 m.a.s.l. and 76 km north of Lima.

== Festivals ==
- March-April: Easter week
- July: Virgin of Carmen
- October: Anniversary of Huaral district, Lord of Miracles
- December: Immaculate Conception (Huando)

== See also ==
- Huaral province
- Huaral
- Lima Region
