= Lampian District =

Coordinates: 11°14′15″S 76°50′23″W

Lampian
- District
- Interactive map of Lampian
- Country: Peru
- Region: Lima
- Province: Huaral
- Capital: Lampian

Government
  - Mayor: Calin Alberto Lopez Bazan

Area
  - Total: 144.97 km^{2} (55.97 sq mi)
- Elevation: 2,450 m (8,040 ft)

Population (2017)
  - Total: 336
  - Density: 2.32/km^{2} (6.00/sq mi)
- Time zone: UTC-5 (PET)
- UBIGEO: 150607

Lampian District is one of twelve districts of the province Huaral in Peru.
