= 27 de Noviembre District =

27 de Noviembre
- District
- Interactive map of 27 de Noviembre
- Coordinates: 11°11′31″S 76°46′49″W
- Country: Peru
- Region: Lima
- Province: Huaral
- Founded: January 18, 1957
- Capital: Cárac

Government
  - Mayor: Marcelo Castro Vilcachagua (2019-2022)

Area
  - Total: 204.27 km^{2} (78.87 sq mi)
- Elevation: 2,611 m (8,566 ft)

Population (2017)
  - Total: 411
  - Density: 2.01/km^{2} (5.21/sq mi)
- Time zone: UTC-5 (PET)
- UBIGEO: 150612

27 de Noviembre District is one of twelve districts of the province Huaral in Peru.
