= Atavillos Bajo District =

Coordinates: 11°21′12″S 76°49′23″W

Atavillos Bajo
- District
- Interactive map of Atavillos Bajo
- Country: Peru
- Region: Lima
- Province: Huaral
- Capital: San Agustín de Huayopampa

Government
  - Mayor: Pablo Humberto Mendoza Soto

Area
  - Total: 164.89 km^{2} (63.66 sq mi)
- Elevation: 1,878 m (6,161 ft)

Population (2017)
  - Total: 902
  - Density: 5.47/km^{2} (14.2/sq mi)
- Time zone: UTC-5 (PET)
- UBIGEO: 150603

Atavillos Bajo District is one of twelve districts of the province Huaral in Peru.
