= Willem Adelaar =

Dutch linguist

Willem F. H. Adelaar
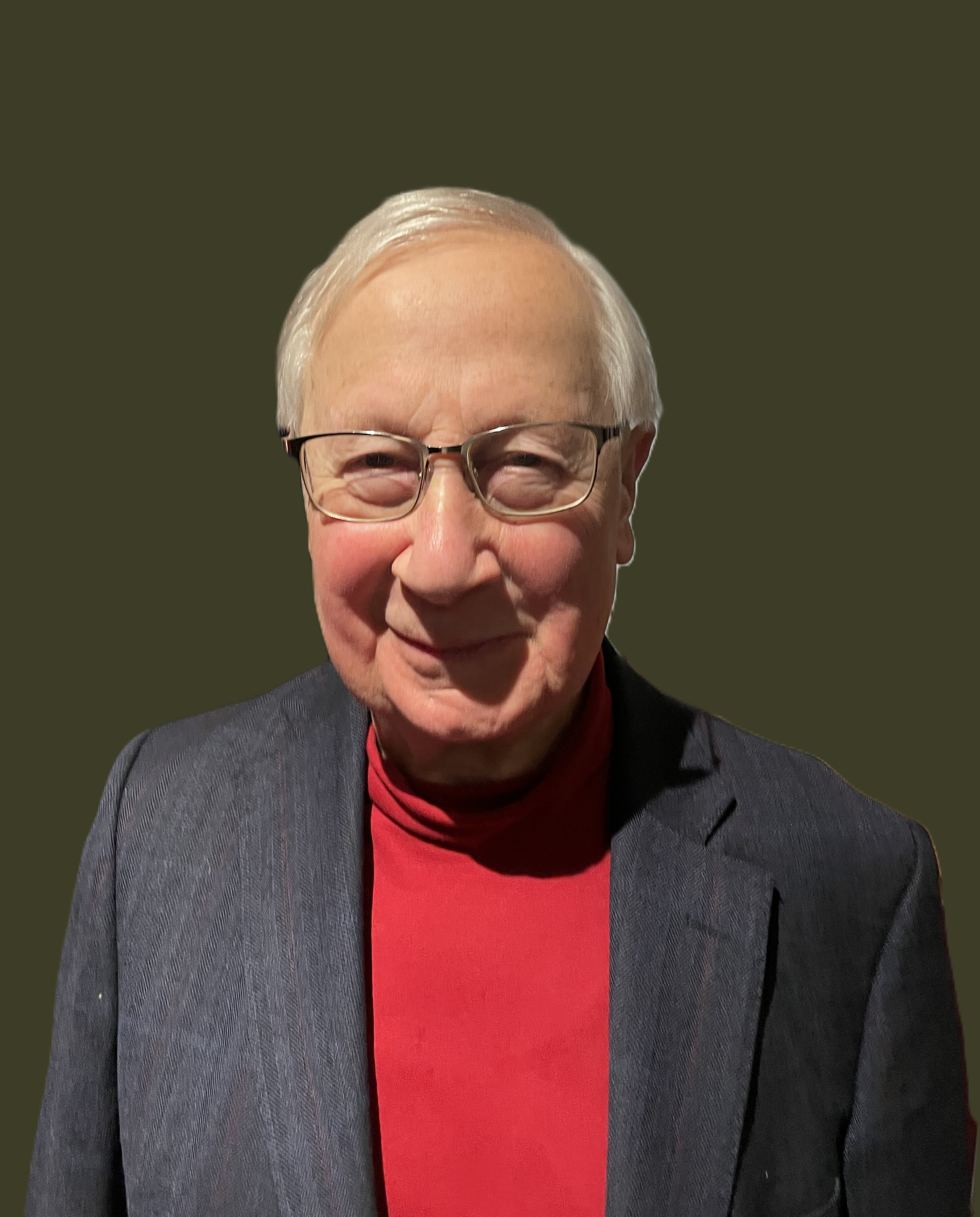
- Adelaar (2026)
- Born: February 3, 1948 (age 78); The Hague, Netherlands
- Occupation: Linguist

Academic work
- Institutions: Leiden University
- Main interests: Native American languages

Willem F. H. Adelaar (born 1948 at The Hague) is a Dutch linguist specializing in Native American languages, specially those of the Andes. He is a Professor of Indigenous American Linguistics and Cultures at Leiden University.

He has written broadly about the Quechua, Aymara and Mapuche languages. His main works are his 2004 The languages of the Andes, an overview of the indigenous languages of the Andean region, which is considered a "classic" in the field. His Dutch language publications about the history and religion of the Inca and translations of Quechua chronicles have met with a broad public. A specialist on minority languages and language endangerment, he is also editor of UNESCO's "Interactive Atlas of the World's Languages in Danger".

In 1994, he was given a newly created Professorial chair in "Languages and Cultures of Native America" at the University of Leiden. He is noted for his belief that the linguistic diversity of the Americas suggests a deeper history of population than the standard account of the settlement of the Americas.

In 2014, he was made Knight of the Order of the Netherlands Lion in recognition of his scientific achievements. He also holds an honorary doctorate from the Universidad Nacional Mayor de San Marcos of Lima, Peru. In 2019, he was elected a member of Academia Europaea.

== Selected publications ==
- ——, ed. (2009), UNESCO Interactive Atlas of the World's Languages in Danger, Paris: UNESCO — regional editor for South America
- —— (2007). "Ensayo de clasificación del katawixí dentro del conjunto harakmbut-katukina". In Romero Figueroa, A.; Fernández Garay, A.; Corbera Mori, A. (eds.). Lenguas indígenas de América del Sur: Estudios descriptivo-tipológicos y sus contribuciones para la lingüística teórica. Caracas: Universidad Católica Andrés Bello. pp. 159–169.
- —— (2007). "The importance of toponymy, family names and historical documentation for the study of disappearing and recently extinct languages in the Andean region". In Wetzels, Leo (ed.). Language Endangerment and Endangered Languages. Leiden: CNWS. pp. 325–331. — Linguistic and anthropological studies with special emphasis on the languages and cultures of the Andean-Amazonian border area
- —— (2006). "The Quechua impact in the Amuesha language, an Arawak language of the Peruvian Amazon". In Aikhenvald, A. Y.; Dixon, R. M. W. (eds.). Grammars in Contact. A Cross-Linguistic Typology. Oxford University Press. pp. 290–312. ISBN 978-0-19-920783-1.
- —— (2004). The Languages of the Andes. Cambridge Language Surveys. With the collaboration of Pieter C. Muysken. Cambridge University Press. doi:10.1017/CBO9780511486852. ISBN 978-0-521-36831-5.
- —— (1995). "Raíces lingüísticas del Quichua de Santiago del Estero". In Fernández Garay, A.; Viegas Barros, J. P. (eds.). Actas de las Segundas Jornadas de Lingüística Aborigen. Universidad de Buenos Aires. pp. 25–50.
- —— (1994). "La procedencia dialectal del manuscrito de Huarochirí en base a sus características lingüísticas". Revista Andina. 12 (1). Cusco: Centro "Bartolomé de Las Casas": 137–154.
- —— (1990). "Aymarismos en el quechua de Puno". Indiana. 11: 223‑231. doi:10.18441/ind.v11i0.223-231.
- —— (1986). Morfología del Quechua de Pacaraos. Lima: Universidad Nacional Mayor de San Marcos.
- —— (1982). Léxico del quechua de Pacaraos. Lima: Universidad Nacional Mayor de San Marcos, Centro de Investigación de Linguística Aplicada. Documento de Trabajo No. 45.
