= Huaral province =

Province of Peru

Coordinates: 11°30′S 77°12′W

Huaral
- Province
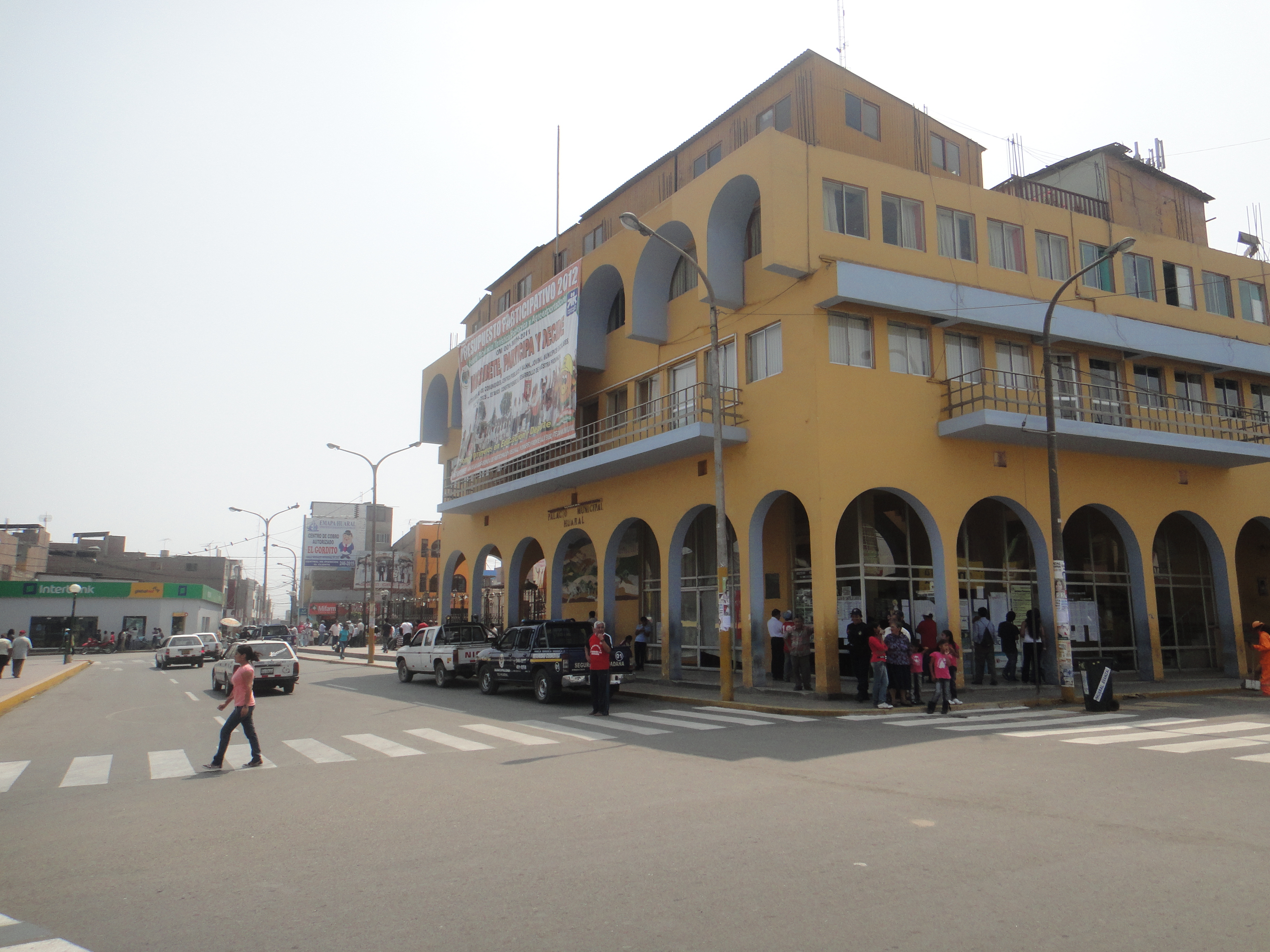
- Municipal Headquarters

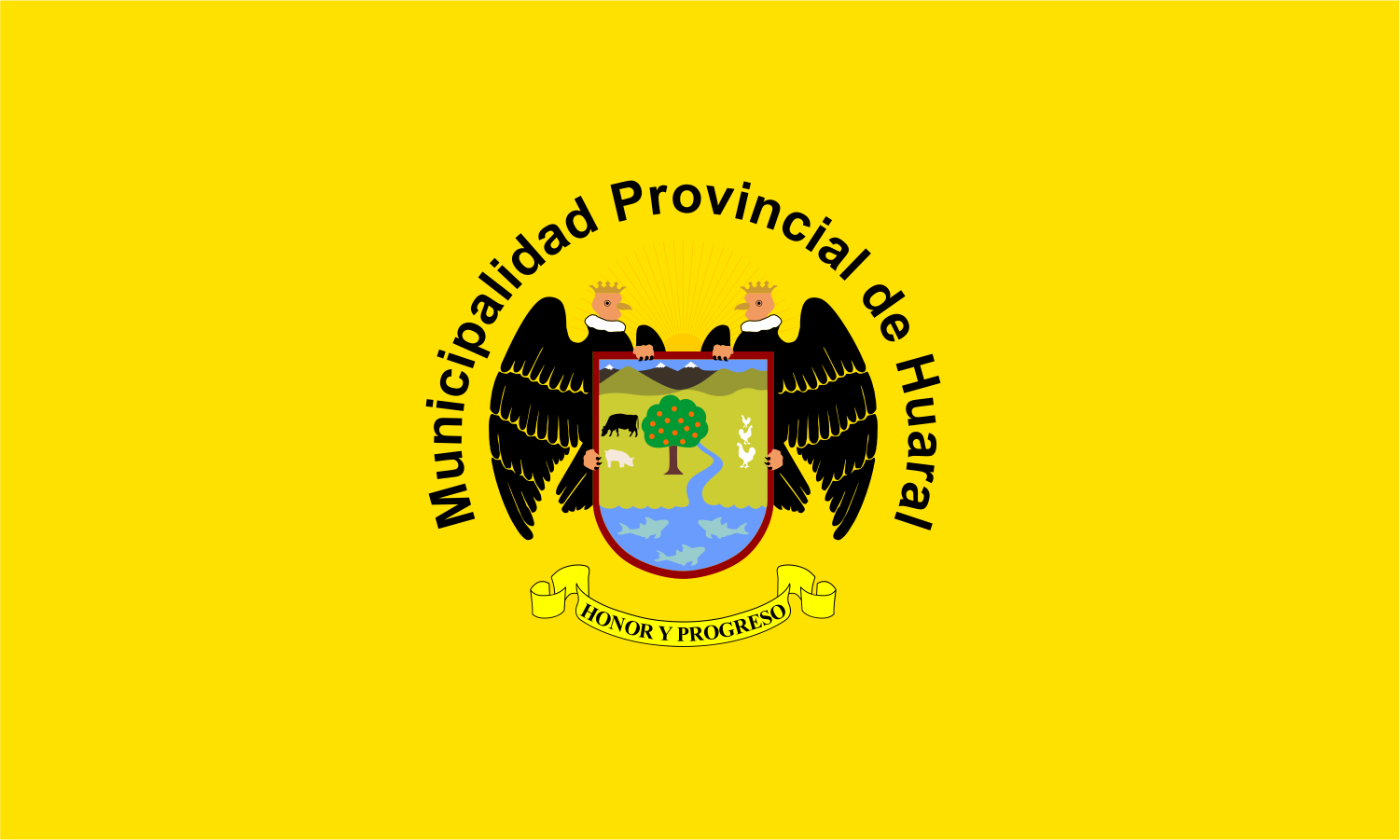
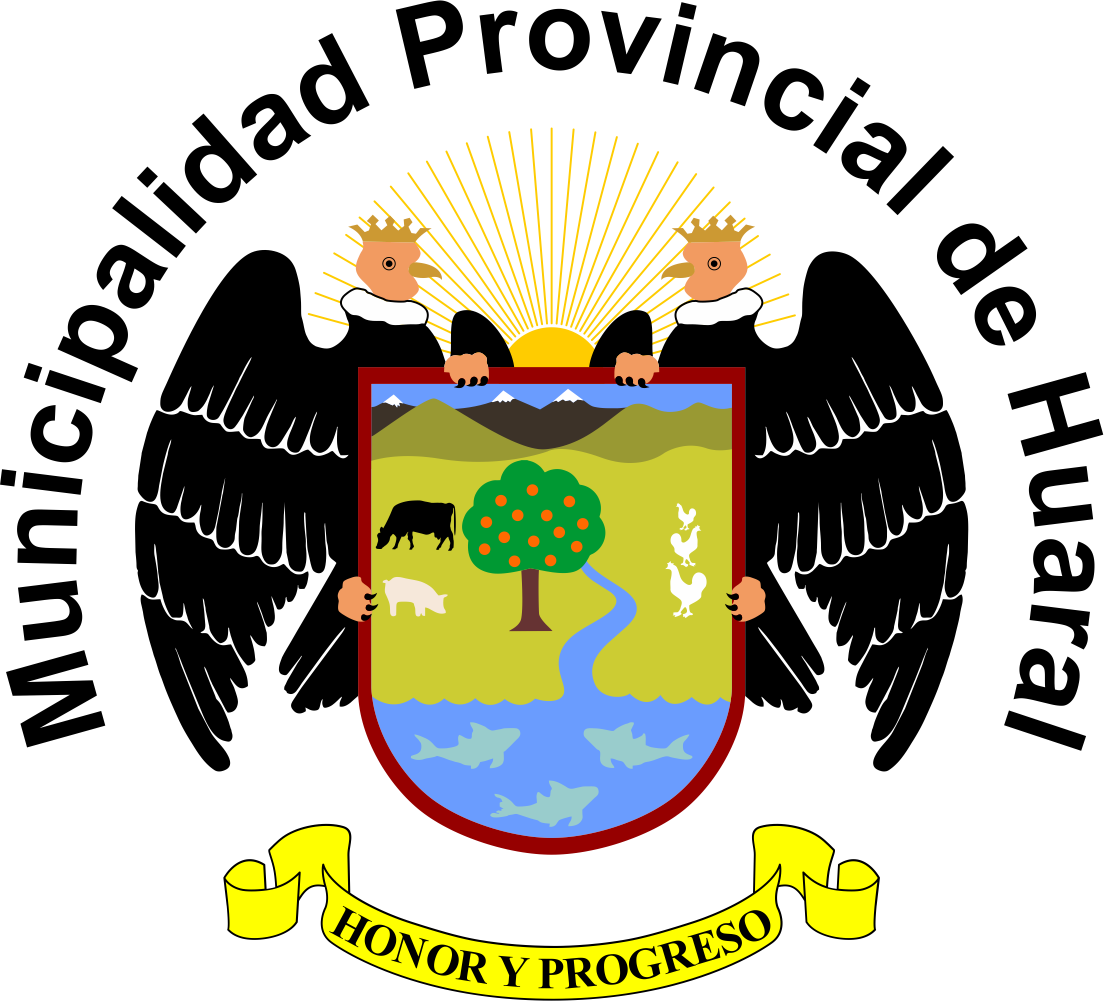
- Flag Coat of arms

- Location of Huaral in Lima
- Country: Peru
- Department: Lima
- Founded: May 11, 1976
- Capital: Huaral

Government
  - Mayor: Fernando José Cárdenas Sánchez (2023-2026)

Area
  - Total: 3,655.7 km^{2} (1,411.5 sq mi)

Population
  - Total: 183,898
  - Density: 50.304/km^{2} (130.29/sq mi)
- UBIGEO: 1506
- Website: Official Website

Huaral is a province of the department of Lima, Peru. From the administrative point of view of the Catholic Church in Peru, it forms part of the Diocese of Huacho. Geographically, its territory extends around the valley of the Chancay River from the mountainous frontier of the Pasco Region and Junín Region up to the Pacific Ocean.

== History ==
It was created by Law No. 21488 on May 11, 1976, by president Francisco Morales Bermúdez out of eight districts of the province of Canta and four of the province of Huaura.

== Geography ==
It borders the province of Huaura to the north, the provinces of Canta and Lima to the south, the provinces of Pasco and Yauli to the east, and the Pacific Ocean to the west. The Puwaq Hanka mountain range traverses the province. Some of the highest peaks of the province are listed below:

- Allqay
- Anta Chuku
- Anta Qullpa
- Asul Urqu
- Asulqucha
- Chunta
- Chunta Pata
- Janq'u Q'awa
- Kuntur Wank'a
- Kusuruqucha
- Llank'i
- Mina Wayllay
- Misapata
- Miyu
- Mut'i
- Parqash
- Pataqucha
- Pinkuylluyuq
- Pirwa Hirka
- Puka Qaqa
- Pumaqucha
- Purum Marka
- Puwaq Hanka
- Quncha
- Qharmin
- Q'ara Suqu
- Tunshuq
- Turmanya
- Uqshapata
- Wamanripa
- Wamp'u Qalla
- Wanaku Punta
- Wank'a Hankalla Qullqa
- Waqramarka
- Waru Kancha
- Wayllay
- Yaku Pampa
- Yana Kancha
- Yana Qaqa
- Yana Uqa Punta
- Yana Uqhu
- Yana Uqsha
- Yanaqucha
- Yunkan
- Yuraq Wank'a

== Political division ==
The province is divided into twelve districts (Spanish: distritos, singular: distrito):

- Huaral
- Atavillos Alto
- Atavillos Bajo
- Aucallama
- Chancay
- Ihuari
- 27 de Noviembre
- Lampian
- Pacaraos
- Santa Cruz de Andamarca
- Sumbilca
- San Miguel de Acos

== Attractions ==
=== Lachay Hills ===
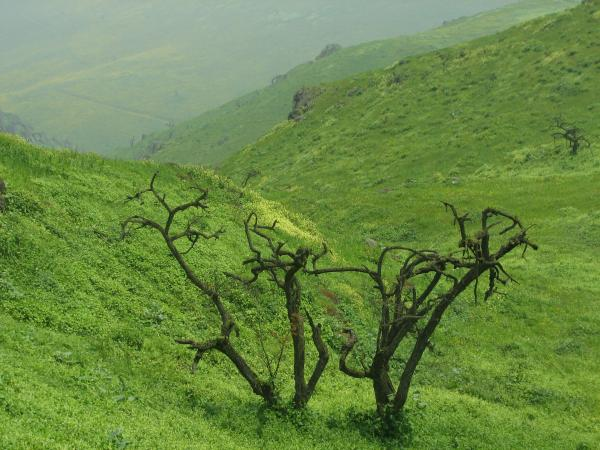
View of the Lachay Hills.

This ecosystem is a representative example of hills with vegetation found only in Peru and northern Chile. It preserves a rich flora and fauna with numerous endemic species. It also constitutes an important recreational area for the residents of Lima and neighboring towns, whose conservation and proper development have often been threatened.

=== Chancay Castle ===
Chancay Castle, or Boggio Castle, located in Huaral Province, is a medieval-style castle built between the 1920s and 1930s on a rocky cliff on the beaches of Chancay.

=== Hacienda Huando ===
The old house or hacienda located in Huando is a former Peruvian hacienda, located in the Huaral Valley, 8 km east of the city of Chancay. It was owned by the Graña family, who used it as a fruit farm, especially the Huando orange plantation.

=== Rúpac ===
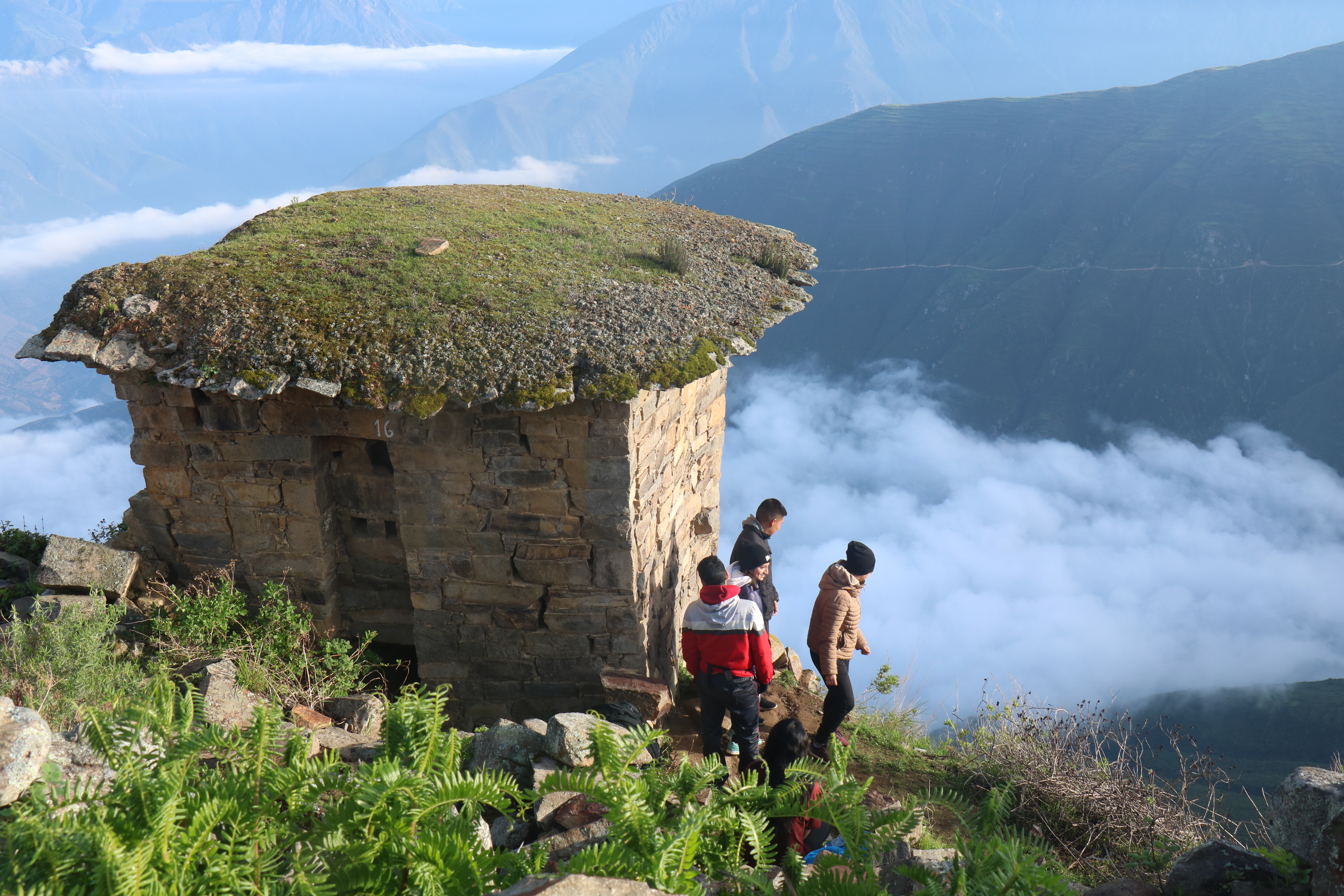
Rúpac Viewpoint

The Rúpac archaeological site, sometimes referred to as the "Machu Picchu of Lima," is located in the Atavillos Bajo district, within the province of Huaral, at 3,500 meters above sea level and 145 km from Lima.

== See also ==
- Challwaqucha
- Willkaqucha
- Yanawayin Lake
