= Chancay =

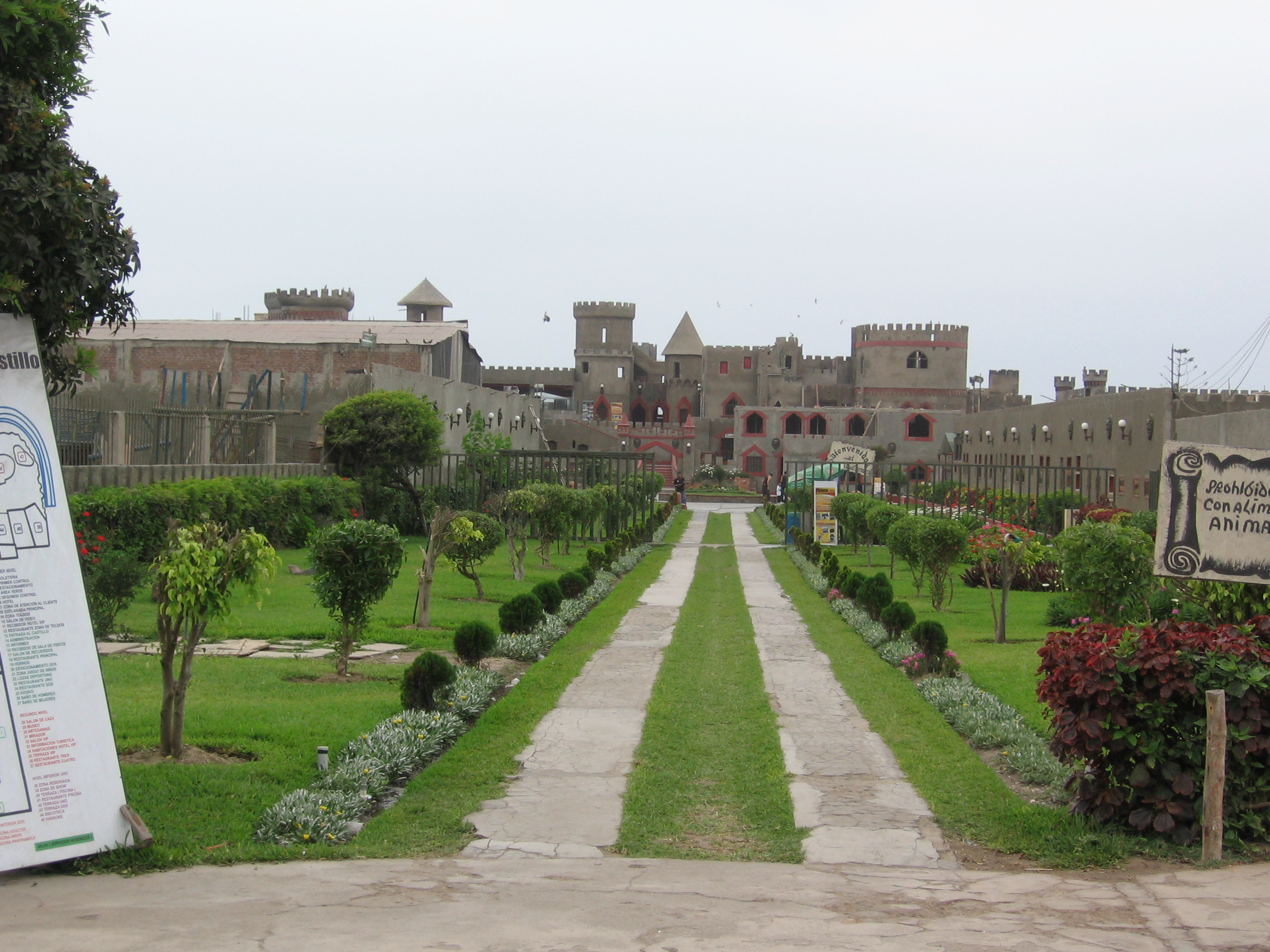

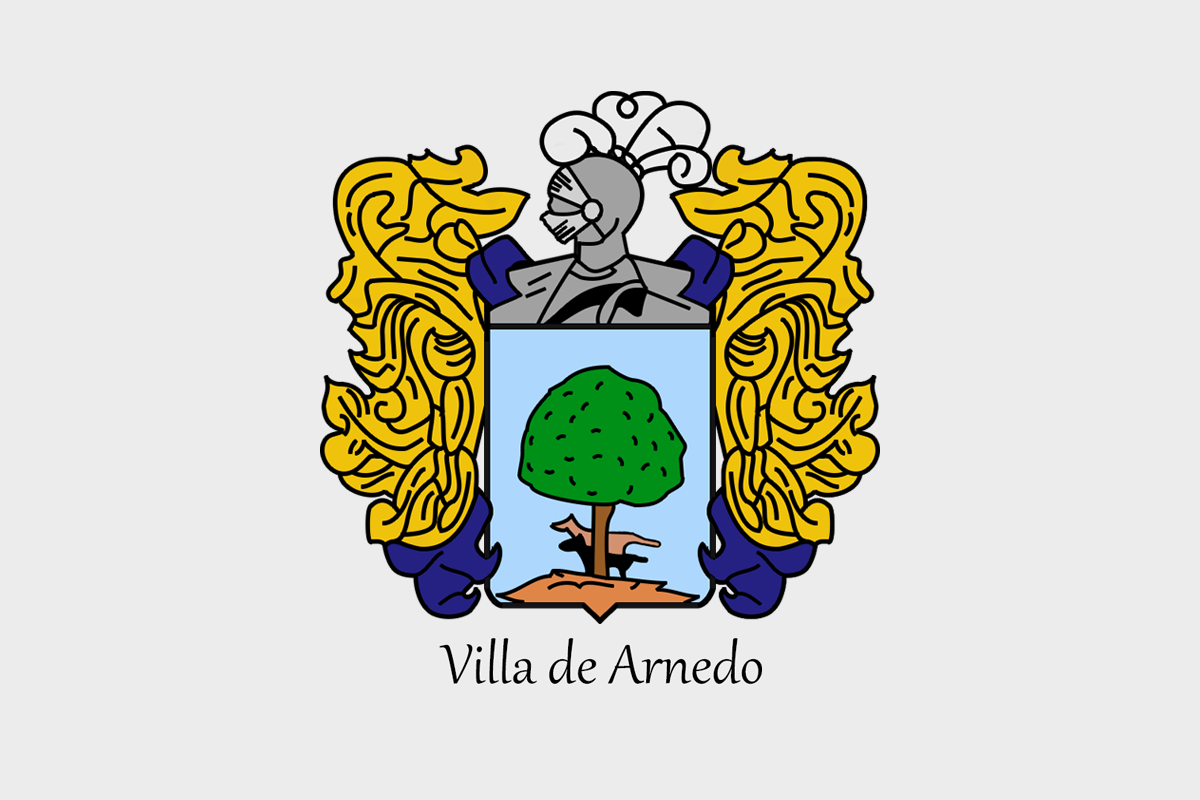
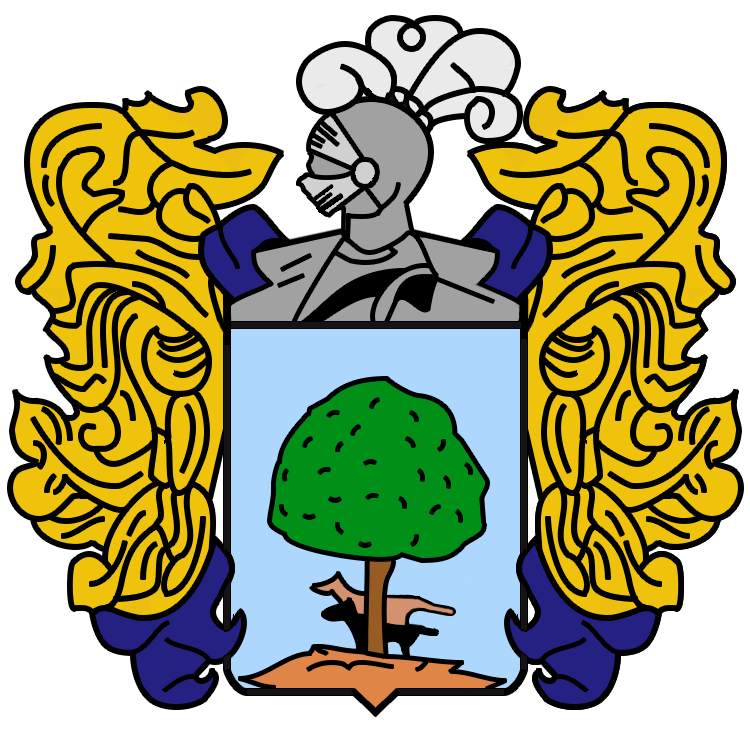
- Flag Seal

- Location within Peru
- Coordinates: 11°33′55″S 77°16′17″W
- Country: Peru
- Region: Lima
- Province: Huaral
- District: Chancay
- Founded: 16 December 1562

Government
  - Mayor: Domitila Aurora Dulanto De Balta

Population
  - Estimate (2015): 63,378
- Demonym: Chancayano/a
- Time zone: UTC-5 (PET)
- Website: www.munichancay.gob.pe

Chancay is a small city located 78 km (48 mi) north of Lima. Its population is 63,378. The Chancay culture was a pre-Columbian archaeological culture, later part of the Inca Empire.

The small city is the site of the Chancay Mega-port, a deep water port built by China as part of its Belt and Road Initiative. The port began operations in November 2024, speeding shipment of resources from Peru to China.

== History ==
The town and its associated valley lend their name to the historic Chancay culture which covered an area centered mostly in the Chancay and Chillón valleys.

The modern settlement was founded in 1562 under the name of Villa de Arnedo.

The main activity in Chancay these days is as a tourist resort for nearby Lima. The main attraction is El Castillo, a faux castle, recently repaired but constructed in the nineteenth century. There is a small museum in the castle displaying Chancay culture pottery and mummies.

== Port of Chancay ==
In 2019, China's shipping corporation COSCO agreed to build a new the Chancay Mega-port, a deep water port, on the coast of Chancay as part of China's Belt and Road Initiative and in 2022, the China Harbour Engineering Company of China Communications Construction Company agreed to build the complex at 992 hectares (2,450 acres) which includes breakwaters, docks and a 1.8 kilometres (1.1 mi) tunnel to warehouses. The first dock was expected to open in early 2023 and when finished, the complex will accept up to 1.5 million twenty-foot equivalent unit intermodal containers and 6 million tons of cargo annually.

The port of Chancay began operation in November 2024 and was formally opened by General Secretary of the Chinese Communist Party Xi Jinping. Several observers, as noted in the references, are concerned that the port area is owned by China not by Peru and that the port is private, not public like other Peruvian ports. COSCO Shipping is the exclusive operator and user of the port, unless Peru is successful in negotiating that others may use the port. China wants to speed the travel time of resources like copper from Peru to ports in China, and this port is anticipated to take 10 days off the shipping time. Concerns have risen internationally about possible use of the port as a Chinese military base. Concerns have also been raised about reparations for damaging effects of the construction in nearby areas, particularly from a tunnel that is part of the port complex.

New railways are proposed to serve this port.

== Economy ==
Until the build of the harbour the main economy was fishing by local fishermen. Since the harbour was built locals complain of smaller catches. The dredging of the port, which sucked sediment from the seabed to create a shipping channel 17 meters (56 feet) deep has affected fish breeding grounds, according to locals.

== Gallery ==
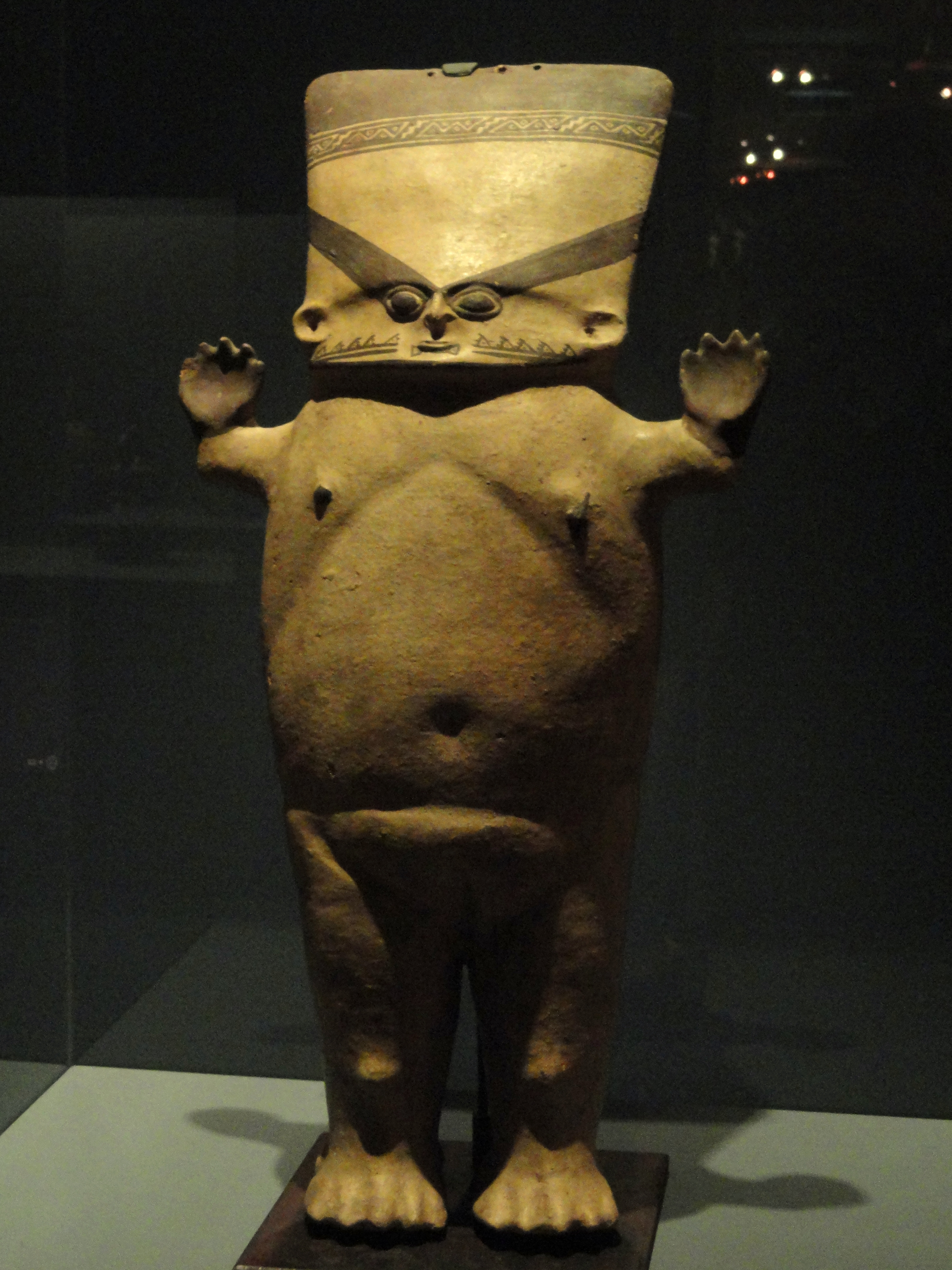
Female figure, Chancay, Peru, 1000–1450 AD

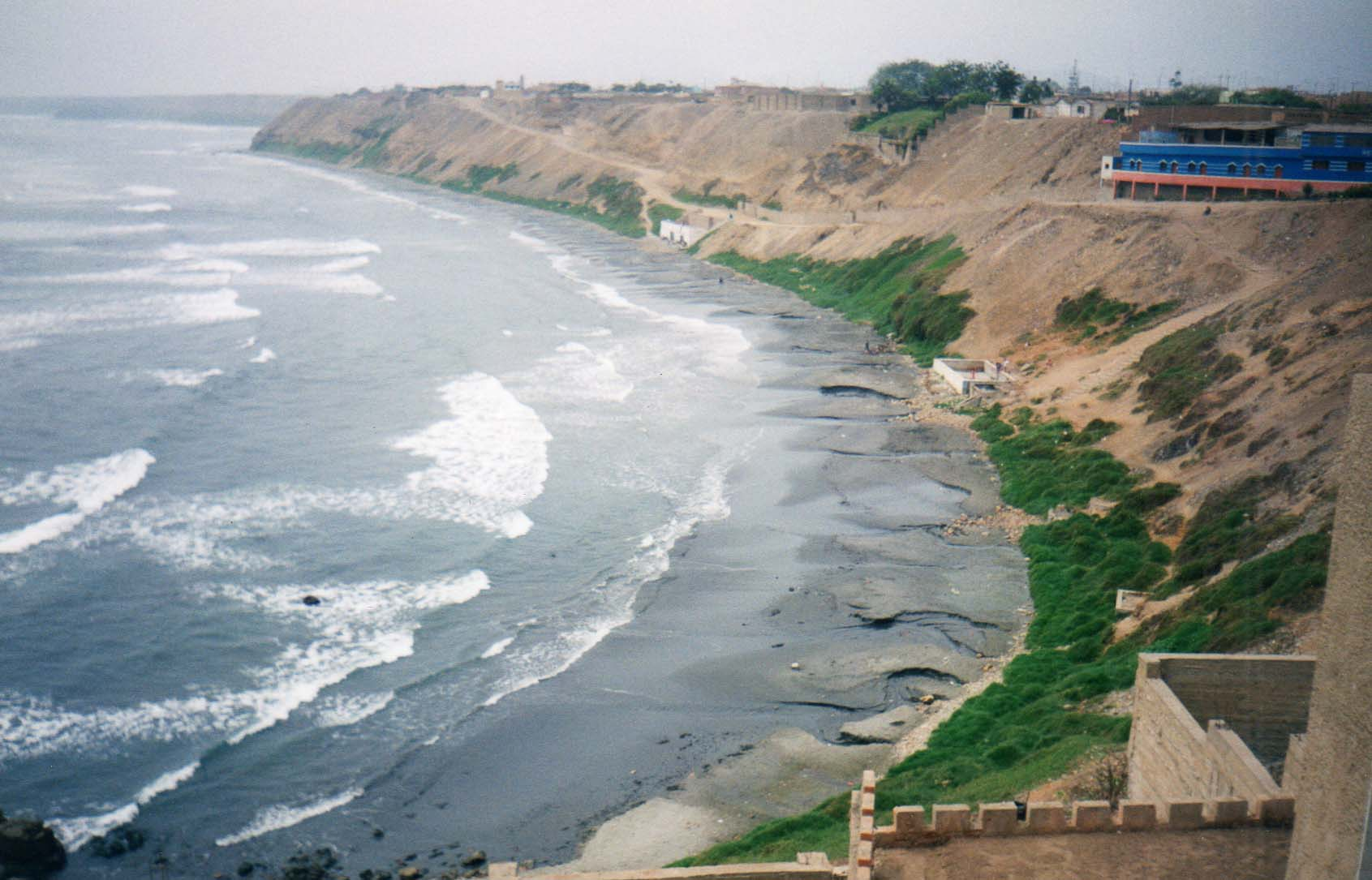
The oil polluted beach at Chancay, Peru.

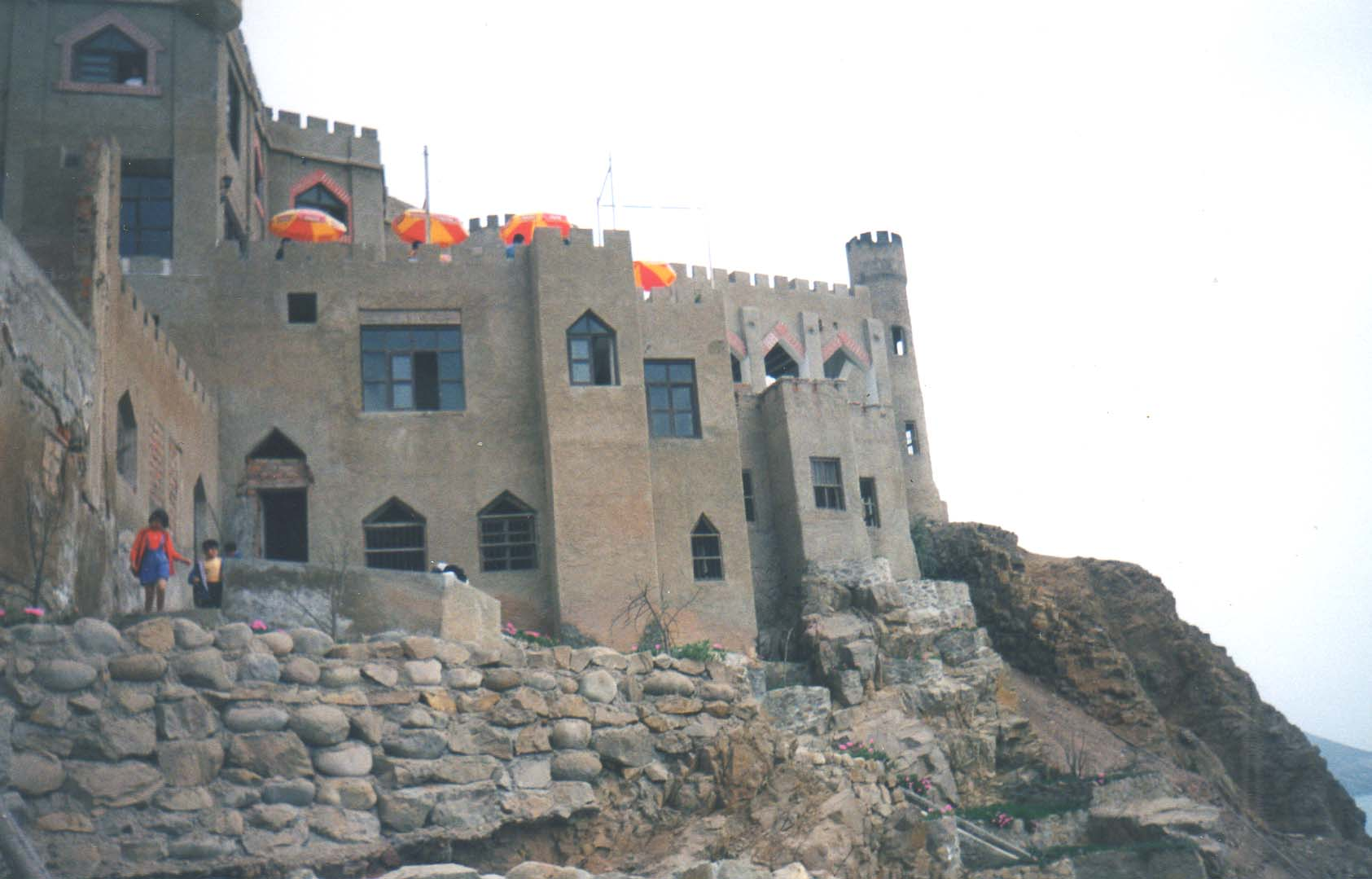
El Castillo, Chancay, Peru

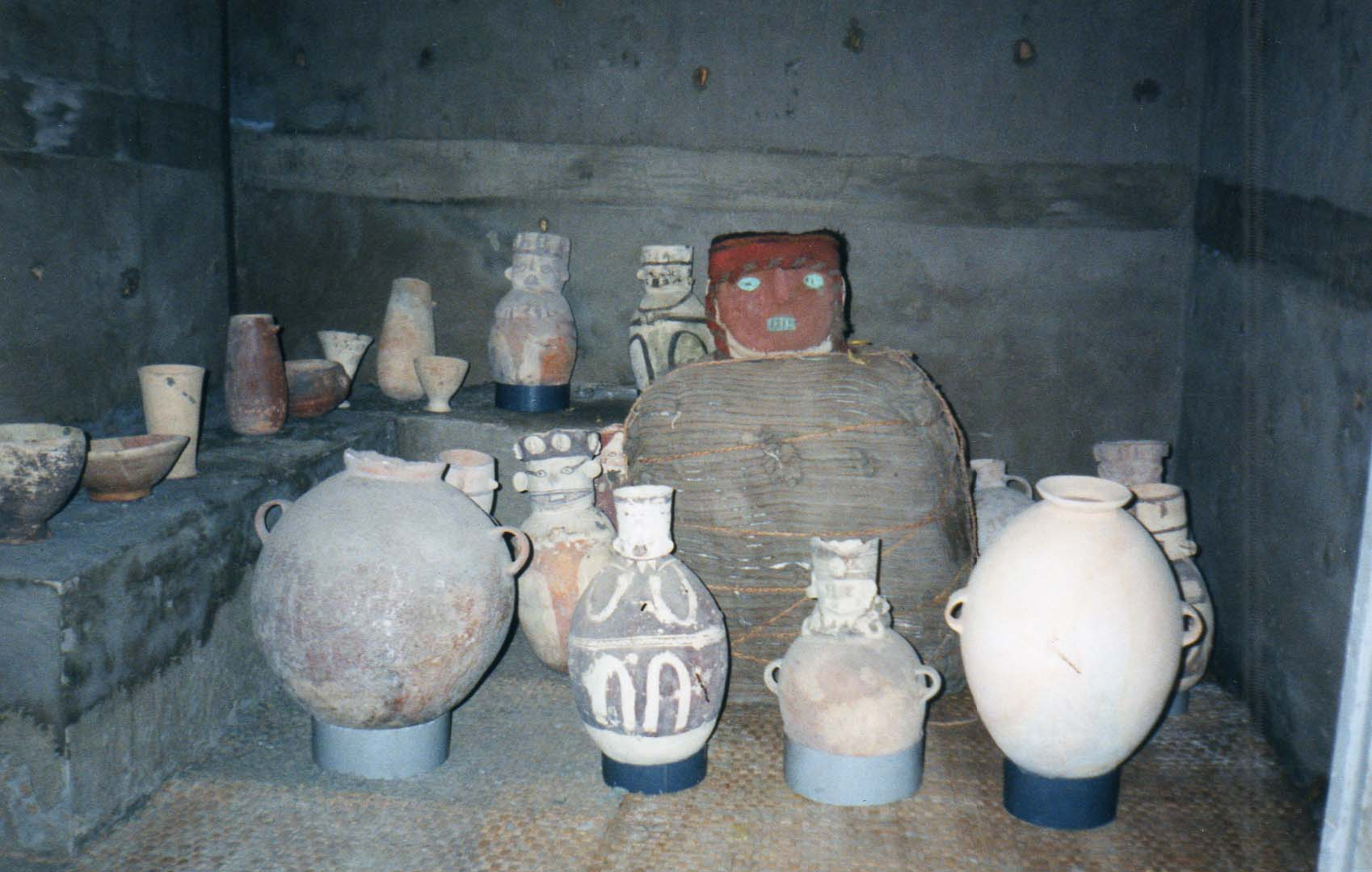
Chancay culture artifacts. El Castillo, Chancay, Peru.

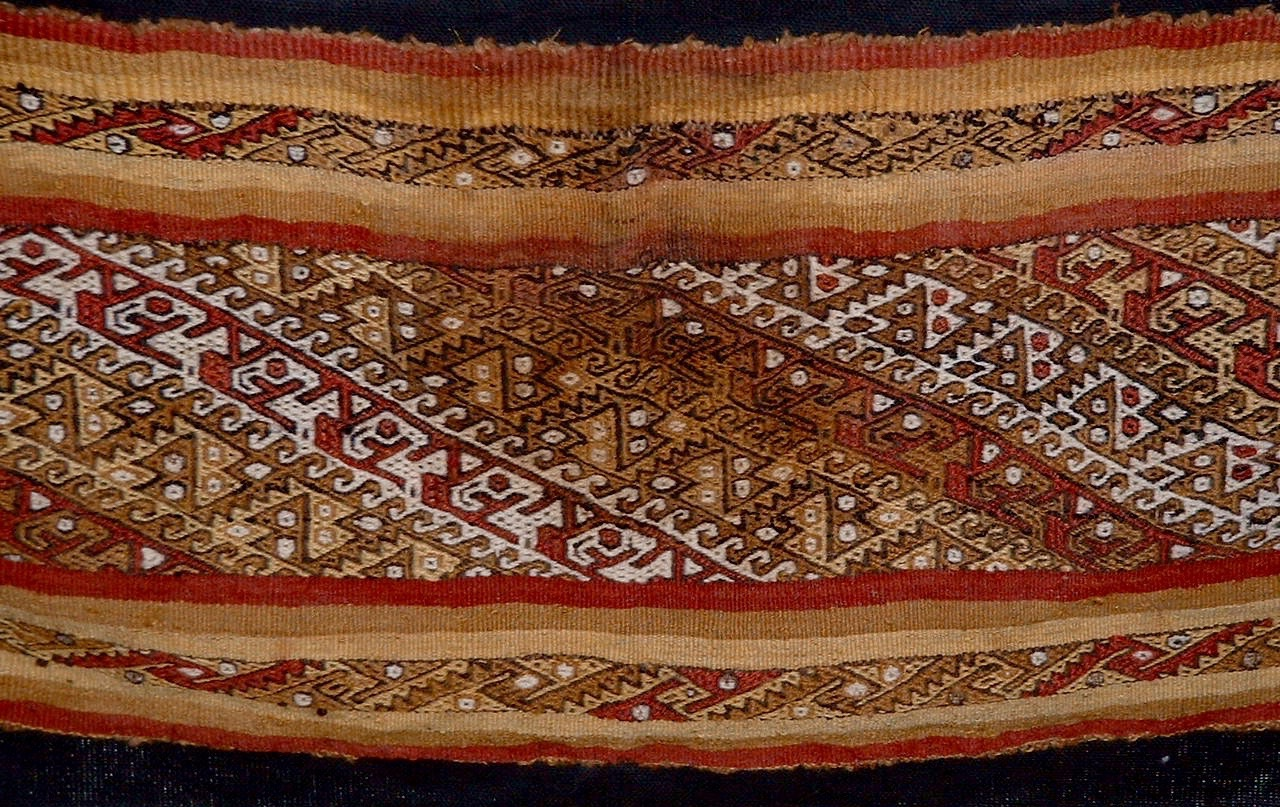
Chancay culture textile, late Precolumbian

== See also ==
- Chancay culture
