= Chancay District, Huaral =

Coordinates: 11.568577°S 77.269657°W

Chancay
- District
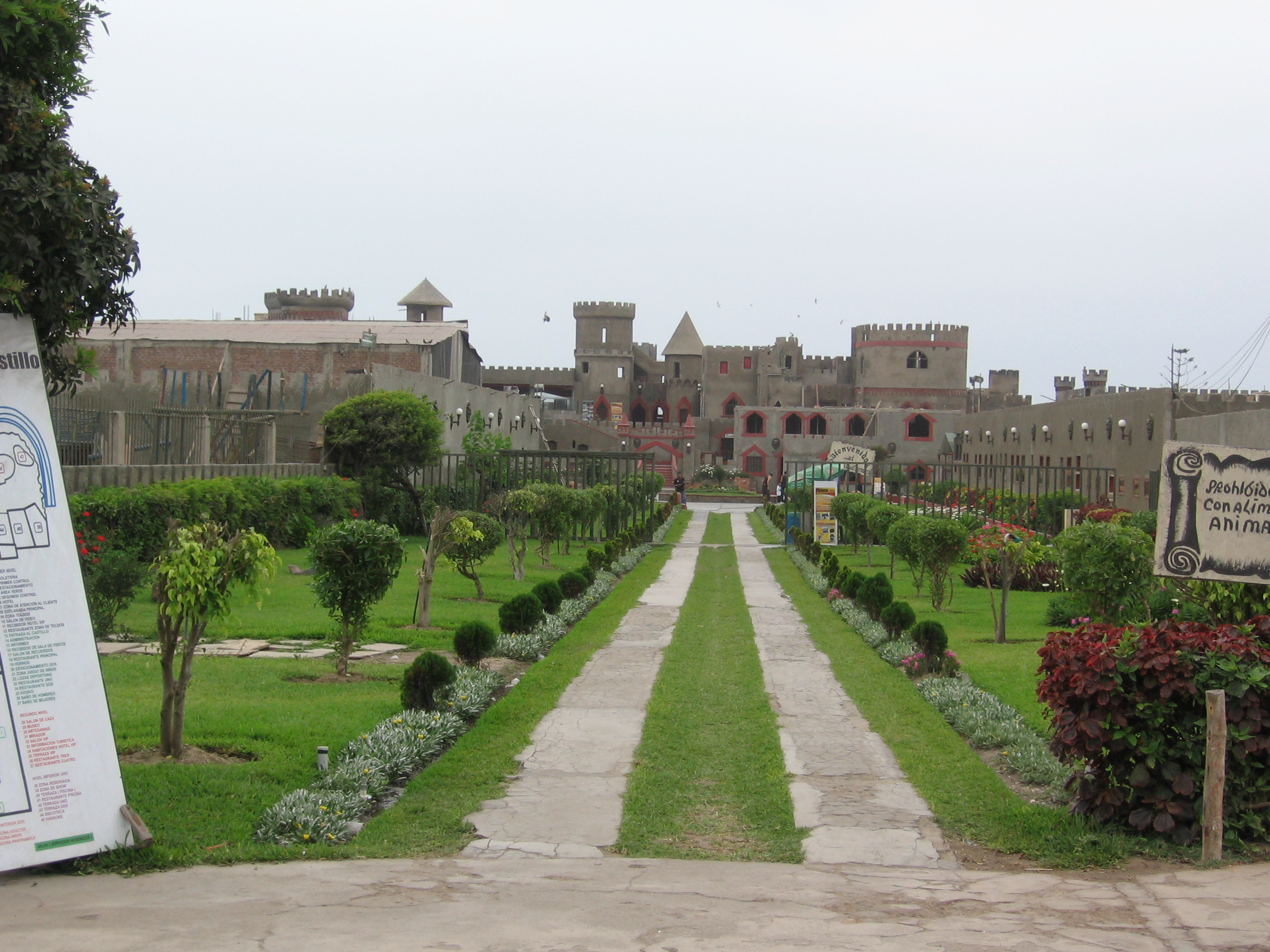
- Castle in Chancay

- Location of Chancay in the Huaral province
- Country: Peru
- Region: Lima
- Province: Huaral
- Founded: April 16, 1828
- Capital: Chancay

Government
  - Mayor: Domitila Aurora Dulanto De Balta (2019-2022)

Area
  - Total: 150.11 km^{2} (57.96 sq mi)
- Elevation: 43 m (141 ft)

Population (2017)
  - Total: 56,920
  - Density: 379.2/km^{2} (982.1/sq mi)
- Time zone: UTC-5 (PET)
- UBIGEO: 150605
- Website: Official Website

Chancay District is one of twelve districts of the province Huaral in Peru.

== History ==
In the pre-Columbian Chancay culture ruled over the valleys of Chancay and Huaura. The mummies found from the Ancon and Zepita necropolis have evidence that this culture expanded far north up to the Chillón valley. The Chancay culture took place between 1300 and 1450 A.D and after that became part of the Inca Empire.

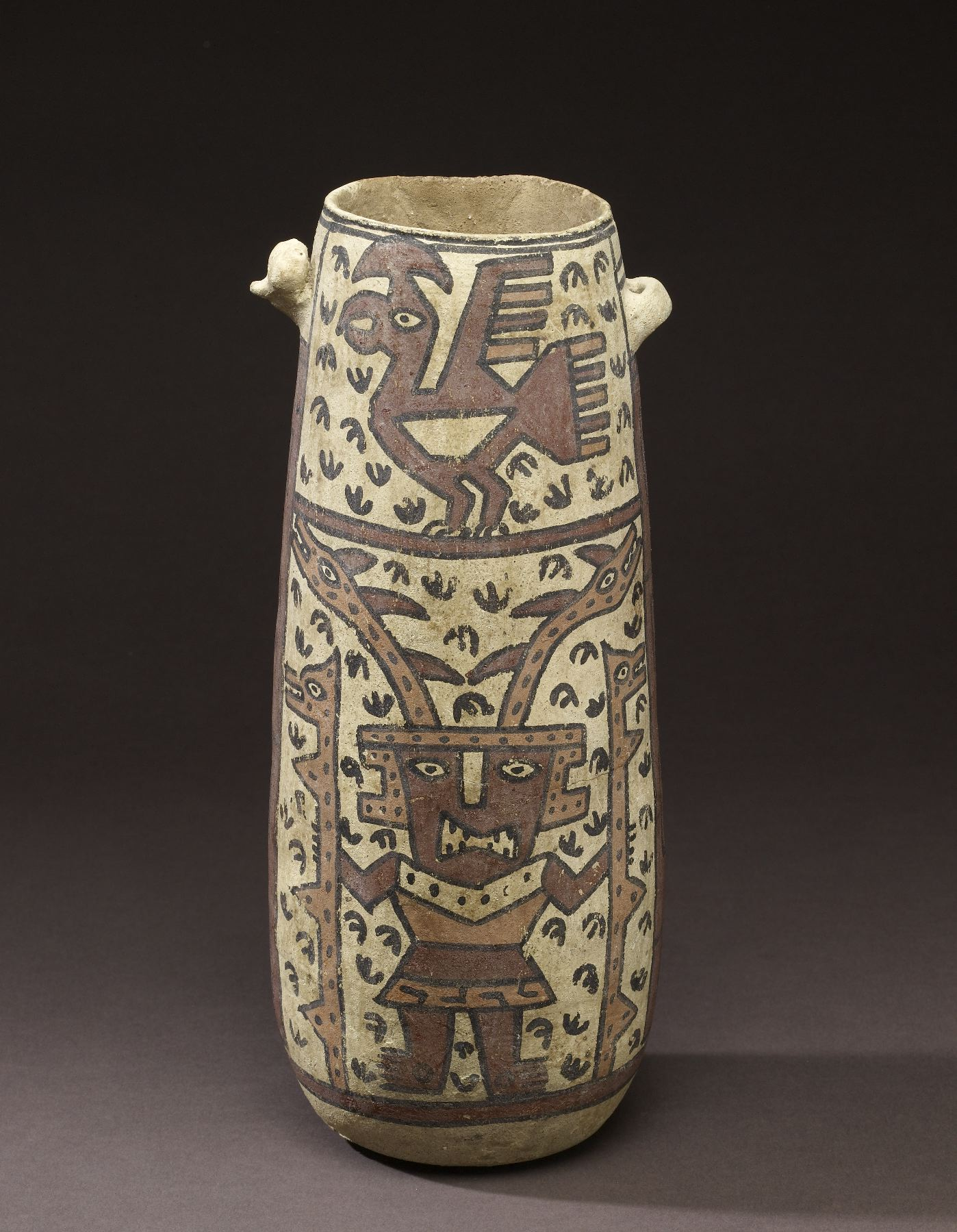
Pottery of the Chancay culture

Chancay was founded by Luis Flores, according to the viceroy Diego López de Zúñiga, 4th Count of Nieva, on November 16, 1562. By then its name was Villa de Arnedo in memory of the fee he had in Spain.

Although it was a "Spanish town", according to the 1792 census, the town had a total of 2960 people but only 369 were Spanish. Most of them were slaves and Indians.

By the time of Peru's independence, the April 16, 1828 law was created by the people of Chancay, and that made the town a "faithful town"

In 1966, a 6.2 magnitude earthquake caused great damage in the north of Chancay and part of the Lima-Callao area. 30 people died in Chancay and 4,000 homes were destroyed, in the Lima-Callao area 100 people died because of the tsunami and homes collapsed there, trapping the people inside them.

== Capital ==
Its capital, the city of Chancay, is 83 km north of the city of Lima. The altitude of the city is 43 m.a.s.l.

== Administrative division ==
=== Populated areas ===
- Urban
  - Chancay, with 32,312 people
  - Peralvillo, with 15,634 people
  - Buena Vista, with 988 people
  - Chancayllo, with 2,199 people
  - Cerro La Culebra, with 920 people
  - Nueva Estrella, with 701 people
  - Pampa Libre, with 5,776 people
  - Quepe Pampa, with 1,252 people
  - 28 de Julio, with 714 people
- Rural
  - Buena Vista Baja, with 294 people
  - El Hatillo, with 382 people
  - Ex Hacienda Chancayllo, with 279 people
  - La Calera, with 157 people
  - Las Salinas, with 204 people
  - Los Laureles, with 160 people
  - Los Laureles del Norte, with 157 people
  - Los Laureles Sur, with 544 people
  - Pampa El Inca, with 237 people
  - Quepepampa, with 365 people
  - San Cayetano, with 359 people
  - Torre Blanca, with 384 people
  - 4 de Junio, with 596 people

== Festivals ==
- March–April: Holy Week
- June: Simon Peter
- December: Anniversary of Chancay

== See also ==
- Huaral Province
- Lima Region
