= Juan Santos Rebellion =

1742–1752 rebellion in colonial Peru

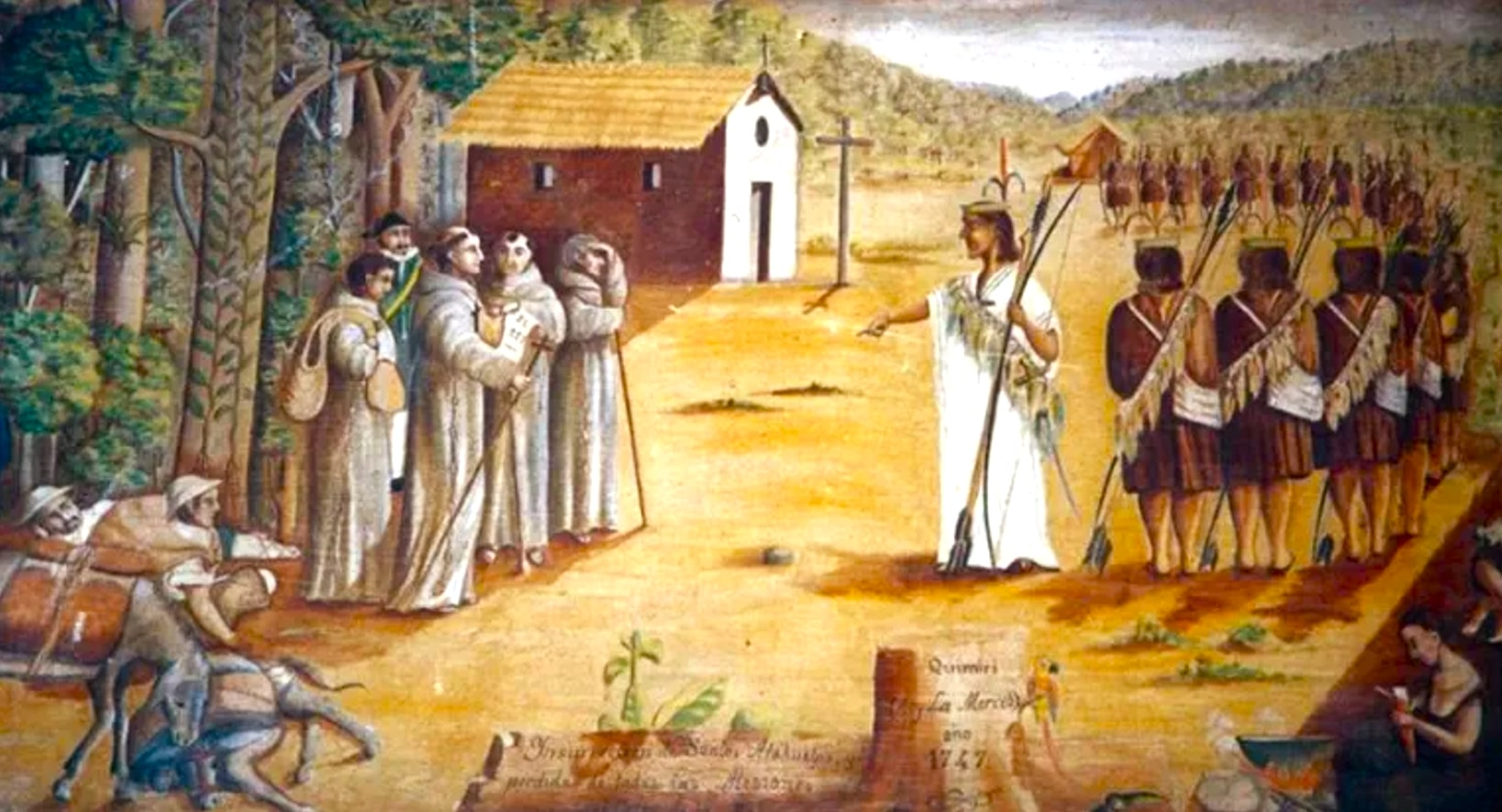
- Juan Santos Atahualpa expels the Spanish missionaries from Quimiri
Date	24 June 1742 – 4 August 1752 (10 years)
Location	Yungas region, Viceroyalty of Peru
Result	Indigenous Peruvian victory
Territorial changes	Spain loses control of the Peruvian Yungas

Belligerents
Indigenous Peruvian rebels: Asháninka; Yanesha; Shipibo; Piro; Quechua	Spain

Commanders and leaders
Juan Santos Atahualpa	(Spanish Empire) José de Mendoza (surrendered) (Spanish Empire) José de Velasco (surrendered)

Strength
2,500–3,000	3,000–5,000

Casualties and losses
300–700 killed	500–1,000 killed

The Juan Santos Rebellion was an Indigenous uprising against the Spanish Empire in Colonial Peru that took place from 1742 to 1752. The rebellion was led by Juan Santos Atahualpa. Juan Santos had worked as an assistant to Spanish Franciscan missionaries in the Peruvian Yungas region, and over time he became outraged at the abuses committed by the Spanish missionaries against the local Asháninka tribe, which led him to plan a rebellion against the Spaniards. Juan Santos declared himself to be the reincarnation of Inca emperor Atahualpa, and he managed to gather a large following among the Asháninkas and other tribes.

Juan Santos Atahualpa and his followers began their rebellion in 1742, and they quickly destroyed the Spanish Missions in the Yungas region. Authorities in Lima responded by sending military expeditions against the rebels in the Yungas, but these expeditions would be constantly defeated by Juan Santos and his guerrilla warfare tactics. As Juan Santos Atahualpa's military success grew, more people flocked to his cause, and his rebels amassed a large arsenal of muskets and cannons. Most of the rebels were Asháninka Indians, but some of them were also Yaneshas, Shipibos, Piros, and Quechuas.

The rebellion would last a decade. In 1752, Juan Santos Atahualpa led his rebels on an incursion into the western highlands of Peru, and captured the town of Andamarca, but he withdrew after just a few days. After this incursion, the Spaniards gave up their attempts to re-occupy the Yungas, and they instead shifted to a defensive strategy to prevent the rebellion from spreading westward to the coast. At this point, the Spanish troops and the rebels mostly stopped attacking each other, and the conflict gradually began to end. Because of Juan Santos Atahualpa's successful rebellion, the Indigenous tribes of the Yungas gained their freedom from the Spanish, and they remained independent for the rest of the colonial period of Peru.

== Background ==
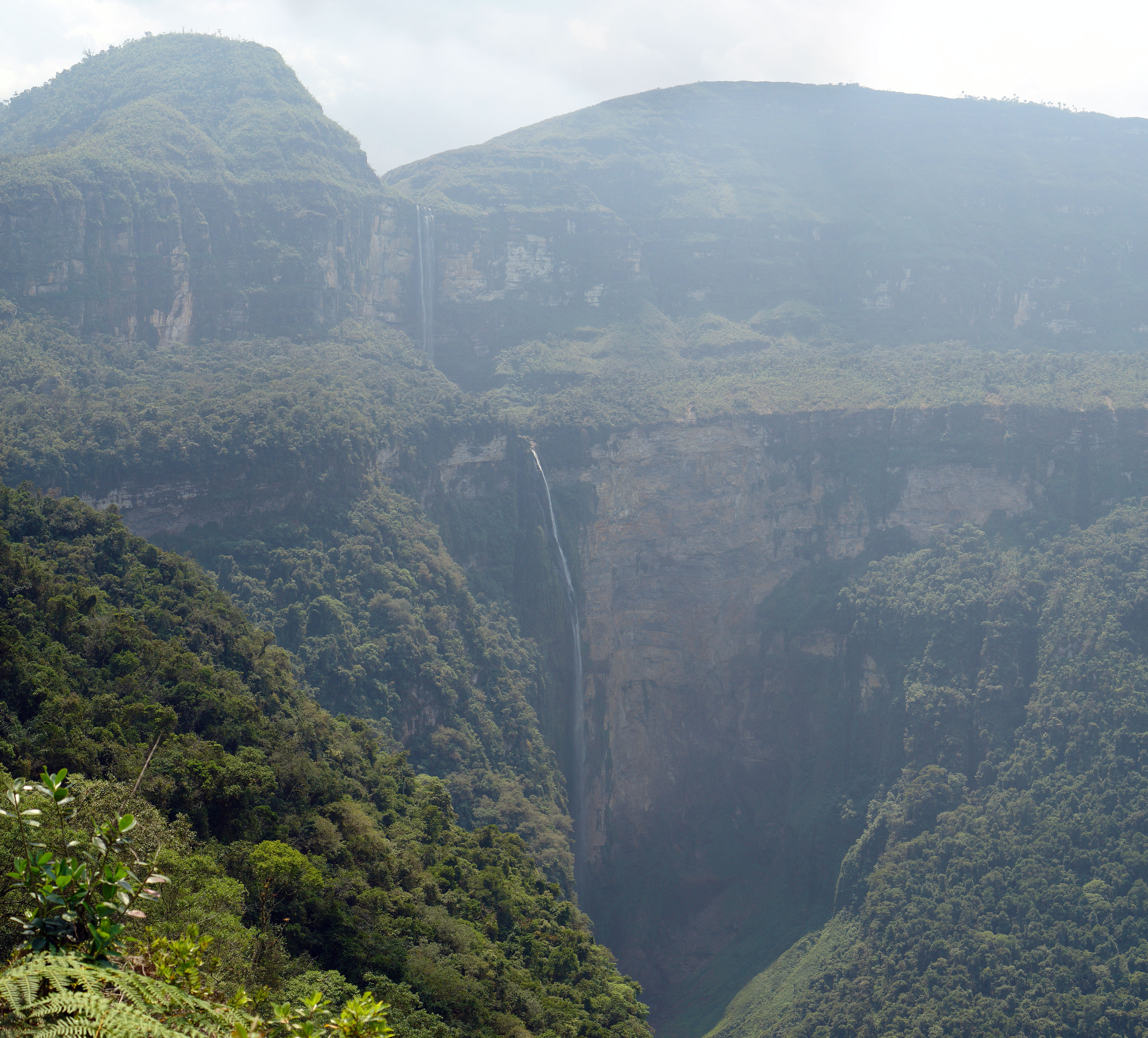
The "Yungas" region of Peru where the rebellion took place.

The Asháninka people were the most populous of the indigenous people of the Peruvian Amazon, occupying a territory of about 100,000 square kilometres (39,000 sq mi) from 10 to 14 degrees south latitude in the foothills of the Andes and in the lowlands of the Amazon Basin. They numbered about 52,000. Not all the widely dispersed Asháninka and other groups participated in the rebellion. Juan Santos' rebellion began on the Gran Pajonal (Great Grassland), an elevated plateau, and his area of influence extended into the regions of the Cerro de la Sal (Mountain of Salt); and the Chanchamayo. Other indigenous groups supporting the rebellion were the Amuesha and Nomatsiguenga peoples.

Missionary activities by the Franciscans began in 1635. From the beginning there was opposition from the Asháninka and others. The Asháninka killed several priests and missions were often abandoned due to the hostility of the local people. A determined and extensive attempt to make Christians of the indigenous people began in 1709 as many missions were founded. Franciscan efforts reached the isolated Gran Pajonal in 1733. In 1736, from a base at Santa Rosa de Ocopa, the missionaries reported that they had established 24 mission stations with 4,835 inhabitants. The Franciscans maintained discipline in their missions with armed men, often African slaves. Several of the missions had military garrisons armed with muskets and cannons. The Franciscans also encouraged settlement by imported farmers and artisans who used indigenous slave labor in their work places.

The indigenous people were attracted to the missions for three reasons. First may have been interest in the Christian religion. Secondly, the missionaries distributed steel tools such as axes and shovels which made the life of a slash-and-burn Asháninka farmer easier and which also made it possible for steel tools to be turned into weapons giving the possessor an advantage over his enemies in war. Thirdly, the indigenous people needed salt as a seasoning and to preserve food and the missionaries attempted to control access to the salt vein at the Cerro de la Sal. Balancing these incentives were the undesirable features of life at the missions. The missionaries attempted to make the semi-nomadic indigenous people sedentary and strictly regiment their lives. This created problems with food production as jungle soils were infertile and easily exhausted and a sedentary people had difficulty growing sufficient food. However, the most serious problem of the reductions, as the Spanish called the policy of encouraging or forcing indigenous people to live in permanent settlements, was the pandemics of European diseases which ravaged the populations of indigenous peoples throughout the Americas, especially those living in close proximity to each other in settlements. For example, an epidemic at the mission of Eneno in 1722-1723 resulted in a decrease in population at the mission from 800 to 220 as most of the inhabitants died of the disease or fled the settlement.

Rebellions against the Franciscans and the missions were frequent. The most recent of the revolts before the rise of Juan Santos was in 1737. An Asháninka headman named Ignacio Torote destroyed two missions killing 13 people, including five priests. A survivor reported that Torote gave his reasons to a priest for the rebellion, "you and yours are killing us every day with your sermons and doctrines, taking our freedom away." Torote's twenty followers were captured and executed by the Spanish and he disappeared into the jungle.

Around 1740 Juan Santos became an assistant to the Franciscan missionaries of the Chanchamayo province, in the central jungle. These missions had facilitated the arrival of Spaniards interested in exploiting the salt from the Cerro de la Sal. They used the Asháninka natives as labor, which led to a number of cruelties.

== Rebellion ==
=== Juan Santos Atahualpa's plan ===
In May 1742, Juan Santos along with a Yine (Piro) named Bisabequi appeared at the Franciscan mission called Quisopango at the southern edge of the Gran Pajonal a few kilometers north of the 21st century town of Puerto Ocopa. What he did or said is unknown but he gained support among the Amuesha and other indigenous people in addition to the Asháninka. Within a few days half a dozen missions in the Cerro de la Sal and Chanchamayo region had been abandoned by the indigenous people. He captured the town of Monobamba on 24 June, 1742, officially starting the rebellion.

An Image depicting an Andean valley in 1744

At the time of the rebellion, Juan Santos was 30 to 40 years old. He wore a cushma or nightgown typical of the jungle Indians and always wore a chonta wood cross with silver corners on his chest. He chewed copious amounts of coca leaf, which he called "God's herb." His features were mestizo. One of the Franciscan friars who visited him described him as tall and with tanned skin, adding: “He has some hair on his arms, he has a very little face, he looks well shaved… he has a good face; pale; hair cut from the forehead to the eyebrows, and the rest from the jawbone around the tail ", that is, gathered in a ponytail, according to the western fashion of the eighteenth century.

Juan Santos's knowledge of the Quechuan languages and several Amazonian languages allowed him to be readily understood by the indigenous people of the central jungle, who joined his struggle with great enthusiasm. The rebellion managed to bring together the peoples of the central jungle: Ashaninka, Yanesha and even Shipibo, that is, the populations that inhabited the basins of the Tambo, Perené and Pichis rivers. This entire area was known by the name of the Gran Pajonal and was the territory of the Franciscan missions.

Juan Santos had more than 2000 men, with whom he managed to control the central jungle, a territory that, otherwise, was not effectively regulated by the viceregal power.

=== Development of the rebellion ===
The first objective of the rebels was the area of Eneno, to later continue with Matranza, Quispango, Pichana and Nijandaris. They destroyed a total of 27 missionaries’ bases and threatened to attack the sierra.

The first violence of the rebellion took place in September 1742 when a locally gathered militia force headed by three Franciscans sallied forth from Quimiri and were ambushed and killed. That same month two Spanish forces of regular soldiers were dispatched from the Andes to suppress the rebellion, but they failed to find Juan Santos. The Spanish built a fort in Quimiri and left 80 soldiers with artillery while most of the army withdrew to the city of Tarma in the Andes. Santos surrounded the fort and offered the Spanish safe passage to Tarma, but they rejected the offer. Attempting to supply the fort with food, a Spanish relief force from Tarma was ambushed and 17 men killed. Later, the desperate, starving Spanish soldiers decided to flee the fort, but they were intercepted by the indigenous forces and all 80 were killed. When a relief force of 300 men arrived at the fort in January 1743, they were greeted with cannon fire from the indigenous forces. The relief force withdrew. Only Sonomoro among the former missions remained in Spanish hands and Santos and his followers were left in uncontested control of a large swath of territory for more than two years.

The Viceroy, José Antonio de Mendoza ordered the governors of the border of Jauja and Tarma, Benito Troncoso and Pedro de Milla Campo, to enter the troubled region, to encircle the rebel. This was done and Troncoso reached Quisopango, where he encountered some resistance, but managed to drive away the Indians. Juan Santos, who shunned the encounter, headed for the town of Huancabamba. Colonial forces left Tarma to search for him, but the mestizo leader managed to escape.

In June 1743, a priest, Santiago Vásquez de Calcedo, journeyed to Quisopango to meet Juan Santos. From that contact and others reported by indigenous leaders, some of Santos's personality and aims became clearer. Santos said that he was a Christian and recited the creed in Latin. He had come to the Pajonal to reclaim "his kingdom." He claimed to be a reincarnation of Atahualpa, the last Inca emperor. He was going to effect that reclamation with the help of indigenous people. Santos said he opposed violence, but he was going to expel the Spanish and their African slaves from Peru with the help of the British, though it is not known if he made any contact with them. The scholar Stefano Varese says the Santos's "attitudes were those of a moderate man" full of "mystical inspiration." He based his rebellion, typical of Millenarianism in colonial societies, on religion. Juan Santos promised that the rebellion would bring peace and prosperity to all the Andes, beginning in the jungle and spreading to the highlands and the coast. Juan Santos said that the culmination of his rebellion would be his coronation as Sapa Inca (supreme ruler of Tawantinsuyu).

=== Guerrilla war ===
Santos's aims seemed more directed at the highland peoples who had been subjects of the Inca Empire rather than the Asháninka and other jungle peoples who had not been subjects and probably did not share his ambitious goals. As told to two African captives, their motivation in supporting Santos was that "they wanted no priests and they did not wish to be Christians." Santos's initial hostility to Africans changed quickly and several former African slaves of the Franciscans became important supporters of the rebellion. The Africans were valued for their knowledge of European weapons and battle tactics. Many indigenous people and mestizos from the Andes also joined the rebellion.

The Spanish organized an expedition to Quimiri (today La Merced), in the Chanchamayo valley. They were under the command of the mayor of Tarma, Alfonso Santa y Ortega, accompanied by the governor of the Border, Benito Troncoso. On 27 October, 1743, they reached Quimiri, where they built a citadel, which they concluded in November. It was equipped with four cannons, with its corresponding supply of ammunition. On 11 November, the magistrate Santa left for central headquarters, leaving Captain Fabricio Bertholi with 60 soldiers in the Quimiri citadel. Juan Santos, who was aware of all his opponent's movements, planned to attack the small garrison. First, he seized a shipment of food that was going to the castle, then started the siege. Many of the Spanish soldiers then perished as a result of an epidemic and demoralization spread in the rest. This went on to the extent that the soldiers were pressured by hunger and some deserted. Then, Juan Santos demanded Bertholi to surrender, but he refused, trusting that the reinforcements that he had requested would soon arrive through a preacher who was able to elude the insurgents. Finally, Juan Santos decided to attack the fort and all the Spaniards were killed. This happened in the final days of the year 1743.

Meanwhile, a new viceroy, José Antonio Manso de Velasco, future Count of Superunda, a highly experienced military man, assumed power. Juan Santos continued attacking him. He took the town of Monobamba, on 24 June, 1746, extending the scope of his movement. He even spoke about demonstrations in favor of him in the distant province of Canta.

In 1746, the viceroy Manco de Velasco sent a force of nearly 1,000 men into the Asháninka territory. It was defeated more by the rain and the jungle rather than the indigenous army, estimated by the Spanish to number 500 but in reality only a widely dispersed part-time force of combatants. After that failure, the Spanish gave up attempts to suppress the rebellion, but instead built fortresses in Chanchamayo and Oxapampa to prevent the rebellion from expanding into the Andean highlands and its relatively large population. Nevertheless, incipient revolts broke out in three highland towns and were brutally repressed by the Spanish. A Franciscan expressed the Spanish fear. "If this (Santos)...headed for Lima with 200 Indian archers, one could fear...a generalized rebellion among all the Indians in the provinces of the Kingdom." In 1750, the Spanish sent another military expedition into rebel territory and it was easily defeated by the guerrilla tactics of the Asháninka and their allies.

In 1751, groups of Asháninka and their Piro allies advanced southward in what was more of an immigration than a military operation to take back former territories in the region of the towns of Satipo and Mazamari, and forcing the evacuation of the Spanish fortress in Sonomoro, the last of the 23 missions in the central jungle. In August 1752, Santos's rebellion reached its high water mark when he led an Asháninka force which captured the highland town of Andamarca in Jauja Province and held it for three days before departing. Hoping perhaps to incite a highland rebellion, Santos avoided taking the lives of the residents and priests in the town.

Manco de Velasco appointed Joseph de Llamas, Marquis of Menahermosa, head of a third expedition. Nevertheless Juan Santos took the initiative by taking Sonomoro in 1751 and Andamarca on August 4, 1752. The latter already meant a serious threat, because Andamarca was on the mountain range and near Tarma, Jauja and Ocopa. The rebellion could spread to the mountains, with its large indigenous population, whose uprising would have given a formidable and decisive turn to it.

The Marquis of Menahermosa tried to catch up with Juan Santos but he managed to get away. This made the viceroy furious, as the vital battle did not result well and the rebels continued to control a large area in the jungle. Rumors spread that Juan Santos would attack Paucartambo, and that Tarma, would fall with Jauja, destroyed. But none of this happened. Mysteriously, the mestizo leader did not carry out his daring attacks and the people of the region once again enjoyed peace.

=== Victory ===
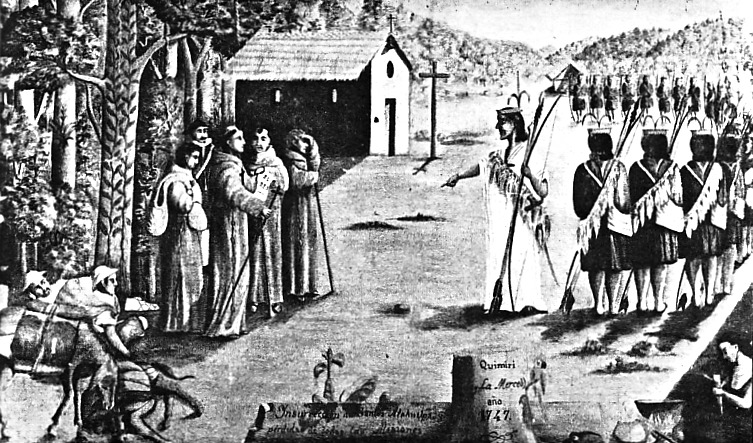
Juan Santos and his supporters confronting Franciscan priests.

The Franciscan priests, the laymen, and the converts living at twenty-one of the twenty-three missions in the central jungle fled to two surviving missions: Quimiri, near the 21st century city of La Merced, and Sonomoro near the 21st century town of San Martin de Pangoa. Juan Santos moved his base of operations 110 kilometres (68 miles) east from Quisopango to the less isolated and more strategically located mission of Eneno on the Perené River in the Cerro de la Sal region.

Having reclaimed their territory and expelled the Spanish, the active phase of the rebellion ended. The area liberated by the indigenous people from the Spanish was about 200 kilometres (120 mi) from Pozuzo in the north to Andamarca in the south, marked by where the yungas merge with the high Andes. It extended about 170 kilometres (110 mi) eastwards to the Ucayali River and its upstream tributaries. It was the first time the indigenous people in the Viceroyalty of Peru succeeded in being free from Spanish rule.

== Aftermath ==
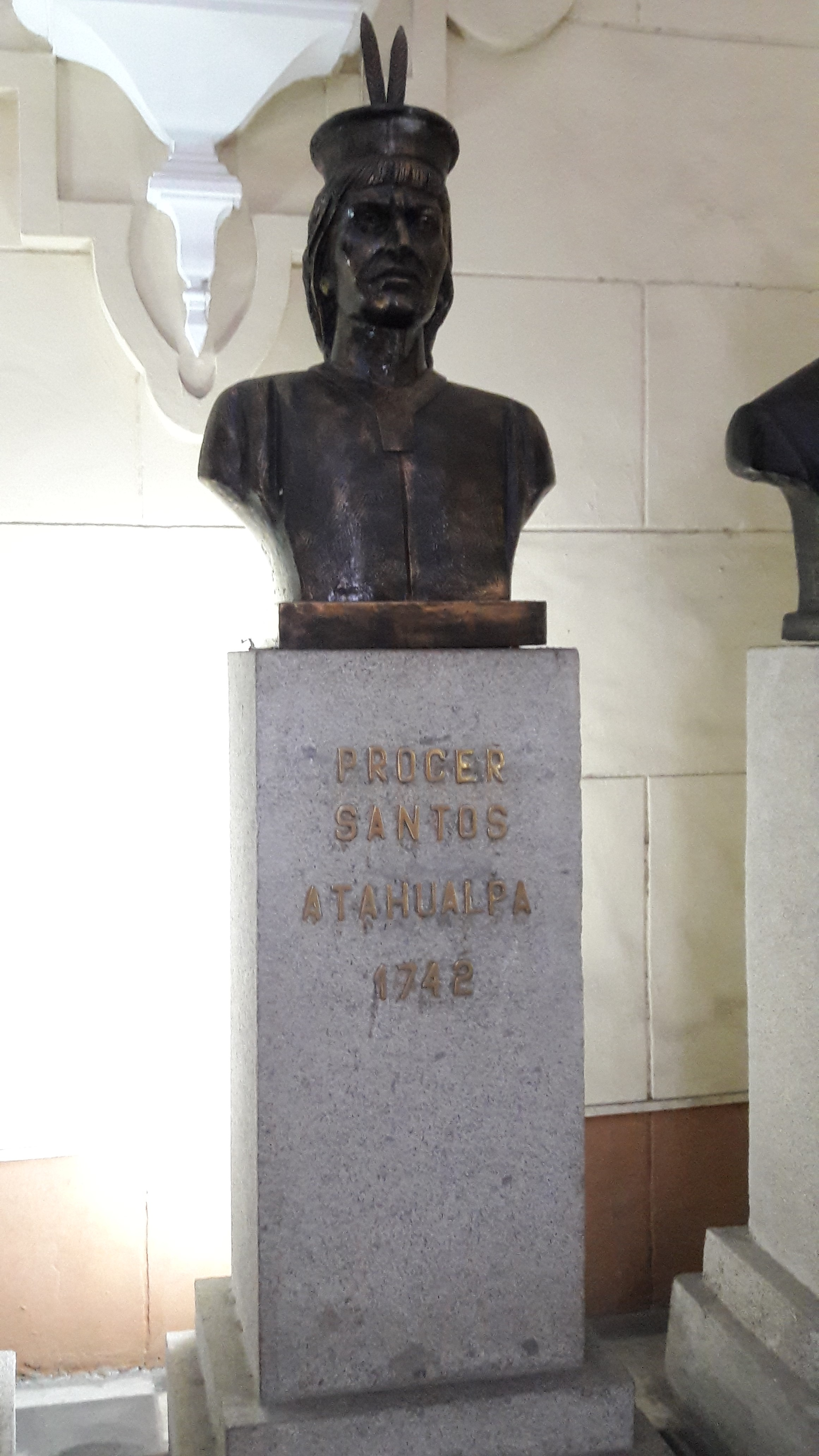
Effigy of Juan Santos Atahualpa in the Panteón de los Próceres in Lima.

The date and circumstances of the death of Juan Santos are unknown. After his capture of Andamarca in 1752, he disappeared. Most Spanish sources believe that he died in 1755 or 1756, although a Franciscan priest thought that he was still alive in 1775. In 1766, two Asháninka followers of Santos said that "his body had disappeared in a cloud of smoke." A small pile of rocks on the Cerro de la Sal commemorates him.

In 1788 the Spanish endeavored once again to enter the territory that the Santos rebellion had wrested from them. The Spanish established two fortresses on the southern edge of the Chanchamayo region in Vitoc and Uchubamba. However, not until 1868 and the founding of the city of La Merced (near the old Franciscan mission of Quimiri) were most of the Chanchamayo and the Cerro de la Sal regions opened up to settlement by non-indigenous people.

== Sources ==
- Brown, Michael F.; Fernandez, Eduardo (1991). War of Shadows. Berkeley: University of California Press. ISBN 0520074483.
