= Juan Santos Atahualpa =

Emperor as Sapa Inca of the Neo-Inca State

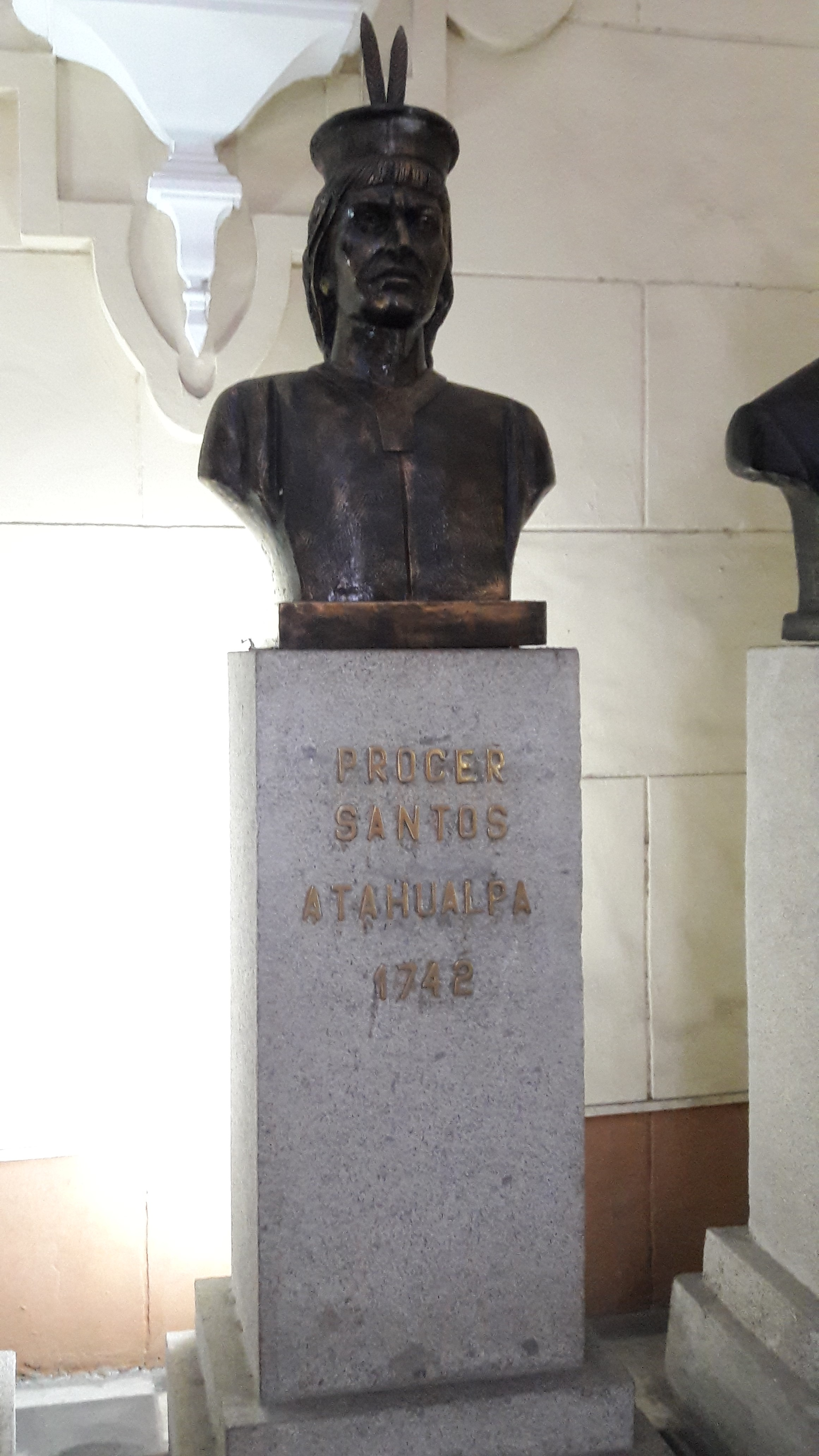
- Bust of Juan Santos Atahualpa in the "Pantheon of Heroes" in Lima

Sapa Inca of the Inca Empire
- Reign: c. May 1742 – c. 1756
- Predecessor: Túpac Amaru (as Sapa Inca of the Neo-Inca State); Paullu Inca (as puppet Sapa Inca of the Inca Empire); Atahualpa (as legitimate Sapa Inca of the Inca Empire)
- Successor: Tupac Amaru II (as indirect successor)
- Born: c. 1710; Cuzco, Viceroyalty of Peru
- Died: 18th-century Peruvian Yungas
- Religion: Inca-Christian syncretism

Juan Santos Atahualpa (c. 1710 – 18th-century) was the messianic leader of a successful indigenous rebellion in the Amazon Basin and Andean foothills against the Viceroyalty of Peru in the Spanish Empire. The Juan Santos Rebellion began in 1742 in the Gran Pajonal among the Asháninka people. The indigenous people expelled Catholic missionaries and destroyed or forced the evacuation of 23 missions, many of them defended, in the central jungle area of Peru. Several Spanish military expeditions tried to suppress the rebellion but failed or were defeated. In 1752, Santos attempted to expand his rebellion into the Andes and gain the support of the highland people. He captured the town of Andamarca and held it for three days before withdrawing to the jungle. Santos disappeared from the historical record after 1752.

Santos, Jesuit-educated with both Christian and millenarian ideas, claimed to be the reincarnation of Atahualpa, the Inca emperor at the time of the Spanish conquest of Peru. His objective seems to have been the expulsion of the Spanish from Peru and the restoration of the Inca Empire. He failed in that ambitious goal, but he and his followers succeeded in expelling Catholic missionaries and preventing Spanish and Peruvian settlement in a large area of the Peruvian Yungas (high jungle or montaña) for more than one hundred years. "Santos' rebellion had given the Indigenous people of the jungle a previously unknown unity and had awakened in them an ancient taste for freedom and independence."

== Early life ==
Little that can be said with certainty about the early life of Juan Santos. He was an indigenous person, born about 1710, probably in Cuzco, although several other birthplaces have been proposed. He had three brothers. He was educated by the Jesuits in Cuzco. He said that he had visited Europe and Angola, presumably as a servant to the Jesuits. Quechua was his native language and he also spoke Spanish, Latin, and Asháninka. Santos apparently had contemplated revolution for a long time. He was said by the Spanish to have traveled widely in Peru as a young man to preach his message and sow the seeds of rebellion. Those travels apparently included the Gran Pajonal where Santos learned to speak Asháninka. The Franciscans later claimed that he fled Cuzco for the Amazon jungles as a fugitive because he murdered his master, a Jesuit priest, although no contemporary evidence backs up that story.

The name Atahualpa comes from the Inca ruler Atahualpa, ruler of the Inca Empire (Tawantinsuyu) at the time of the Spanish conquest in the 16th century. Santos appropriated the names Atahualpa and Huayna Capac as he claimed to be the reincarnation of the former Incan emperors.

== The indigenous people ==
The Asháninka people were the most populous of the indigenous people of the Peruvian Amazon, occupying a territory of about 100,000 square kilometres (39,000 sq mi) from 10 to 14° south latitude in the foothills of the Andes and in the lowlands of the Amazon Basin. They numbered about 52,000. Not all the widely dispersed Asháninka and other groups participated in the rebellion. Juan Santos' rebellion began on the Gran Pajonal (Great Grassland), an elevated plateau, and his area of influence extended into the regions of the Cerro de la Sal (Mountain of Salt) and the Chanchamayo. Other indigenous groups supporting the rebellion were the Amuesha and Nomatsiguenga peoples.

== The missions ==
The area of the rebellion was the nearest and most accessible part of the Amazon Basin to Lima, the capital and largest city of Peru, and thus the happenings there were of special interest and concern to the Spanish.

Missionary activities by the Franciscans began in 1635. From the beginning there was opposition from the Asháninka and others. The Asháninka killed several priests and missions were often abandoned due to the hostility of the local people. A determined and extensive attempt to make Christians of the indigenous people began in 1709 as many missions were founded. Franciscan efforts reached the isolated Gran Pajonal in 1733. In 1736, from a base at Santa Rosa de Ocopa, the missionaries reported that they had established 24 mission stations with 4,835 inhabitants. The Franciscans maintained discipline in their missions with armed men, often African slaves. Several of the missions had military garrisons armed with muskets and cannons. The Franciscans also encouraged settlement by imported farmers and artisans who used indigenous slave labor in their work places.

The indigenous people were attracted to the missions for three reasons. First may have been interest in the Christian religion. Secondly, the missionaries distributed steel tools such as axes and shovels which made the life of a slash-and-burn Asháninka farmer easier and which also made it possible for steel tools to be turned into weapons giving the possessor an advantage over his enemies in war. Thirdly, the indigenous people needed salt as a seasoning and to preserve food and the missionaries attempted to control access to the salt vein at the Cerro de la Sal. Balancing these incentives were the undesirable features of life at the missions. The missionaries attempted to make the semi-nomadic indigenous people sedentary and strictly regiment their lives. This created problems with food production as jungle soils were infertile and easily exhausted and a sedentary people had difficulty growing sufficient food. However, the most serious problem of the reductions, as the Spanish called the policy of encouraging or forcing indigenous people to live in permanent settlements, was the pandemics of European diseases which ravaged the populations of indigenous peoples throughout the Americas, especially those living in close proximity to each other in settlements. For example, an epidemic at the mission of Eneno in 1722-1723 resulted in a decrease in population at the mission from 800 to 220 as most of the inhabitants died of the disease or fled the settlement.

Rebellions against the Franciscans and the missions were frequent. The most recent of the revolts before the rise of Juan Santos was in 1737. An Asháninka headman named Ignacio Torote destroyed two missions killing 13 people, including five priests. A survivor reported that Torote gave his reasons to a priest for the rebellion, "you and yours are killing us every day with your sermons and doctrines, taking our freedom away." Torote's twenty followers were captured and executed by the Spanish and he disappeared into the jungle.

Around 1740 Juan Santos became an assistant to the Franciscan missionaries of the Chanchamayo province, in the central jungle. These missions had facilitated the arrival of Spaniards interested in exploiting the salt from the Cerro de la Sal. They used the Asháninka natives as labor, which led to a number of cruelties.

At this time, Juan Santos was 30 to 40 years old. He wore a cushma or nightgown typical of the jungle Indians and always wore a chonta wood cross with silver corners on his chest. He chewed copious amounts of coca leaf, which he called "God's herb." His features were mestizo. One of the Franciscan friars who visited him described him as tall and with tanned skin, adding: "He has some hair on his arms, he has a very little face, he looks well shaved… he has a good face; pale; hair cut from the forehead to the eyebrows, and the rest from the jawbone around the tail", that is, gathered in a ponytail, according to the western fashion of the eighteenth century.

== Rebellion ==
=== Juan Santos Atahualpa's plan ===
In May 1742, Juan Santos along with a Yine (Piro) named Bisabequi appeared at the Franciscan mission called Quisopango at the southern edge of the Gran Pajonal a few kilometers north of the 21st century town of Puerto Ocopa. What he did or said is unknown but he gained support among the Amuesha and other indigenous people in addition to the Asháninka. Within a few days half a dozen missions in the Cerro de la Sal and Chanchamayo region had been abandoned by the indigenous people.

=== The extent of movement ===
His knowledge of the Quechua language and several Amazonian languages allowed Juan Santos to be readily understood by the indigenous people of the central jungle, who joined his struggle with great enthusiasm. The rebellion managed to bring together the peoples of the central jungle: Ashaninka, Yanesha and even Shipibo, that is, the populations that inhabited the basins of the Tambo, Perené and Pichis rivers. This entire area was known by the name of the Gran Pajonal and was the territory of the Franciscan missions.

Juan Santos had more than 2000 men, with whom he managed to control the central jungle, a territory that, otherwise, was not effectively regulated by the viceregal power.

=== Development of the rebellion ===
The first objective of the rebels was the reduction of Eneno, to later continue with Matranza, Quispango, Pichana and Nijandaris. They destroyed a total of 27 missionaries' bases and threatened to attack the sierra.

The viceroy Marquis de Villagarcía ordered the governors of the border of Jauja and Tarma, Benito Troncoso and Pedro de Milla Campo, to enter the troubled region, to encircle the rebel. This was done and Troncoso reached Quisopango, where he encountered some resistance but managed to drive away the Indians. Juan Santos, who shunned the encounter, headed for the town of Huancabamba. Colonial forces left Tarma to search for him, but the mestizo leader managed to escape.

In June, a priest, Santiago Vásquez de Calcedo, journeyed to Quisopango to meet Juan Santos. From that contact and others reported by indigenous leaders, some of Santos's personality and aims became clearer. Santos said that he was a Christian and recited the creed in Latin. He had come to the Pajonal to reclaim "his kingdom." He claimed to be a reincarnation of Atahualpa, the last Inca emperor. He was going to effect that reclamation with the help of indigenous people. Santos said he opposed violence, but he was going to expel the Spanish and their African slaves from Peru with the help of the British. (There is no evidence Santos was in contact with the British, but his claim of help from them was disturbing to the Spaniards.) The scholar Stefano Varese says the Santos's "attitudes were those of a moderate man" full of "mystical inspiration". He based his rebellion, typical of Millenarianism in colonial societies, on religion. Juan Santos promised that the rebellion would bring peace and prosperity to all the Andes, beginning in the jungle and spreading to the highlands and the coast. Juan Santos said that the culmination of his rebellion would be his coronation as Sapa Inca (supreme ruler of Tawantinsuyu).

Santos's aims seemed more directed at the highland peoples who had been subjects of the Inca Empire rather than the Asháninka and other jungle peoples who had not been subjects and probably did not share his ambitious goals. As told to two African captives, their motivation in supporting Santos was that "they wanted no priests and they did not wish to be Christians". Santos's initial hostility to Africans changed quickly and several former African slaves of the Franciscans became important supporters of the rebellion. The Africans were valued for their knowledge of European weapons and battle tactics. Many indigenous people and mestizos from the Andes also joined the rebellion.

The following year, the Spanish organized an expedition to Quimiri (today La Merced), in the Chanchamayo valley. They were under the command of the mayor of Tarma, Alfonso Santa y Ortega, accompanied by the governor of the Border, Benito Troncoso. On 27 October 1743, they reached Quimiri, where they built a citadel, which they concluded in November. It was equipped with four cannons and four pebbles, with its corresponding supply of ammunition. On 11 November, the magistrate Santa left for central headquarters, leaving Captain Fabricio Bertholi with 60 soldiers in the Quimiri citadel. Juan Santos, who was aware of all his opponent's movements, planned to attack the small garrison. First, he seized a shipment of food that was going to the castle, then started the siege. Many of the Spanish soldiers then perished as a result of an epidemic and demoralization spread in the rest. This went on to the extent that the soldiers were pressured by hunger and some deserted. Then, Juan Santos demanded Bertholi to surrender, but he refused, trusting that the reinforcements that he had requested would soon arrive through a preacher who was able to elude the insurgents. Finally, Juan Santos decided to attack the fort and all the Spaniards were killed. This happened in the final days of the year 1743.

Meanwhile, a new viceroy, José Antonio Manso de Velasco, future Count of Superunda, a highly experienced military man, assumed power. Juan Santos continued attacking him. He took the town of Monobamba on 24 June 1746, extending the scope of his movement. He even spoke about demonstrations in favor of him in the distant province of Canta.

Viceroy Manso de Velasco appointed Joseph de Llamas, Marquis of Menahermosa, head of a third expedition. Nevertheless Juan Santos took the initiative by taking Sonomoro in 1751 and Andamarca on 4 August 1752. The latter already meant a serious threat because Andamarca was on the mountain range and near Tarma, Jauja and Ocopa. The rebellion could spread to the mountains, with its large indigenous population, whose uprising would have given a formidable and decisive turn to it.

The Marquis of Menahermosa tried to catch up with Juan Santos but he managed to get away. This made the viceroy furious, as the vital battle did not result well and the rebels continued to control a large area in the jungle. Rumors spread that Juan Santos would attack Paucartambo, and that Tarma, would fall with Jauja, destroyed. But none of this happened. Mysteriously, the mestizo leader did not carry out his daring attacks and the people of the region once again enjoyed peace.

=== Victory ===
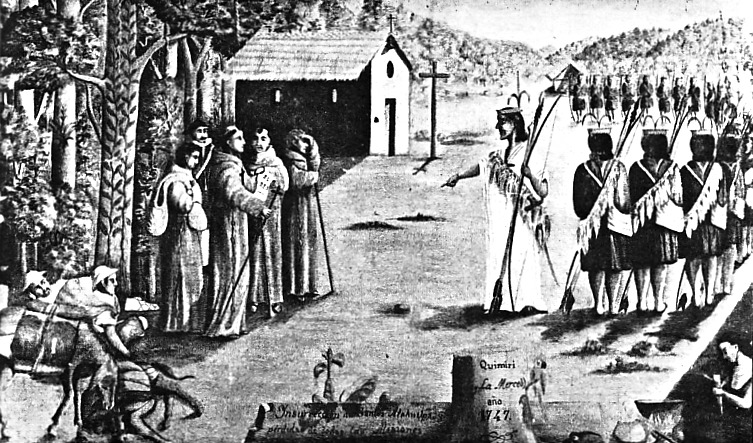
Juan Santos and his supporters confronting Franciscan priests.

The Franciscan priests, the laymen, and the converts living at twenty-one of the twenty-three missions in the central jungle fled to two surviving missions: Quimiri, near the 21st century city of La Merced, and Sonomoro near the 21st century town of San Martin de Pangoa. Juan Santos moved his base of operations 110 kilometres (68 miles) east from Quisopango to the less isolated and more strategically located mission of Eneno on the Perené River in the Cerro de la Sal region.

The first violence of the rebellion took place in September 1742 when a locally gathered militia force headed by three Franciscans sallied forth from Quimiri and were ambushed and killed. That same month two Spanish forces of regular soldiers were dispatched from the Andes to suppress the rebellion, but they failed to find Juan Santos. The Spanish built a fort in Quimiri and left 80 soldiers with artillery while most of the army withdrew to the city of Tarma in the Andes. Santos surrounded the fort and offered the Spanish safe passage to Tarma, but they rejected the offer. Attempting to supply the fort with food, a Spanish relief force from Tarma was ambushed and 17 men killed. Later, the desperate, starving Spanish soldiers decided to flee the fort, but they were intercepted by the indigenous forces and all 80 were killed. When a relief force of 300 men arrived at the fort in January 1743, they were greeted with cannon fire from the indigenous forces. The relief force withdrew. Only Sonomoro among the former missions remained in Spanish hands and Santos and his followers were left in uncontested control of a large swath of territory for more than two years.

In 1746, the viceroy José Manso de Velasco sent a force of nearly 1,000 men into the Asháninka territory. It was defeated more by the rain and the jungle rather than the indigenous army, estimated by the Spanish to number 500 but in reality only a widely dispersed part-time force of combatants. After that failure, the Spanish gave up attempts to suppress the rebellion, but instead built fortresses in Chanchamayo and Oxapampa to prevent the rebellion from expanding into the Andes highlands and its relatively large population. Nevertheless, incipient revolts broke out in three highland towns and were brutally repressed by the Spanish. A Franciscan expressed the Spanish fear. "If this (Santos)...headed for Lima with 200 Indian archers, one could fear...a generalized rebellion among all the Indians in the provinces of the Kingdom." In 1750, the Spanish sent another military expedition into rebel territory and it was easily defeated by the guerrilla tactics of the Asháninka and their allies.

In 1751, groups of Asháninka and their Piro allies advanced southward in what was more of an immigration than a military operation to take back former territories in the region of the towns of Satipo and Mazamari, and forcing the evacuation of the Spanish fortress in Sonomoro, the last of the 23 missions in the central jungle. In August 1752, Santos's rebellion reached its high water mark when he led an Asháninka force which captured the highland town of Andamarca in Jauja Province and held it for three days before departing. Hoping perhaps to incite a highland rebellion, Santos avoided taking the lives of the residents and priests in the town.

Having reclaimed their territory and expelled the Spanish, the active phase of the rebellion ended. The area liberated by the indigenous people from the Spanish was about 200 kilometres (120 mi) from Pozuzo in the north to Andamarca in the south, marked by where the yungas merge with the high Andes. It extended about 170 kilometres (110 mi) eastwards to the Ucayali River and its upstream tributaries.

=== Disappearance of Juan Santos ===
Since the year 1756 nothing was known about Juan Santos. Viceroy Manso de Velasco, in memory of him dated 1761, wrote: "since 1756 ... the rebellious Indian has not been felt and his situation and even his existence are unknown." One idea says that there was an uprising among the rebels and that Juan Santos had to order the death of Antonio Gatica, his lieutenant, and other men for possible treason.

The most varied versions ran on the end of Juan Santos. One of them affirms that he died in Metraro, the victim of a stone fired with a sling in a public celebration; others claim that he was poisoned. Another possibility is that he died of old age. It is even said that he would have had a kind of mausoleum in Metraro, where his human remains rested and were the object of veneration.

His disappearance and probable death had legendary and wonderful overtones in the memory of the mountaineers. For some he had not died, believing that he was immortal. For others he would have ascended to heaven surrounded by clouds, and would return to earth in the future.

Fray José Miguel Salcedo asserted that when he arrived at San Miguel del Cunivo he was received by fourteen canoes with some eighty men with strange displays of rejoicing, including two captains of the rebel, who assured him that Juan Santos «... died in Metraro, and asking them to where he had gone they told me that to hell, and that in front of them his body disappeared, fuming ... ».

=== Treaties of Juan Santos Atahualpa ===
As for Juan Santos's alleged dealings with the English, there is no further documentary information to confirm it. It is possible, however, to make some assumptions based on certain circumstances that occurred at the time, as Francisco Loayza does.

It is known, for example, the longstanding struggle that the English had with the Spanish, in search of greater trade and new markets in America, jealously guarded by the colonial. A series of agreements and concessions that remind us of the ship permission that was granted by the Spanish Crown to England after the signing of the Treaty of Utrecht. These of course made up the facts not unknown to the well informed and educated Juan Santos Atahualpa. What is recorded about him says, "he spoke with the English, who agreed to help him by sea, and that he would come by land, gathering his people, in order to save his crown". For Loayza, this pact is not unlikely due to the above-mentioned events and could have been established in 1741.

== Death and legacy ==
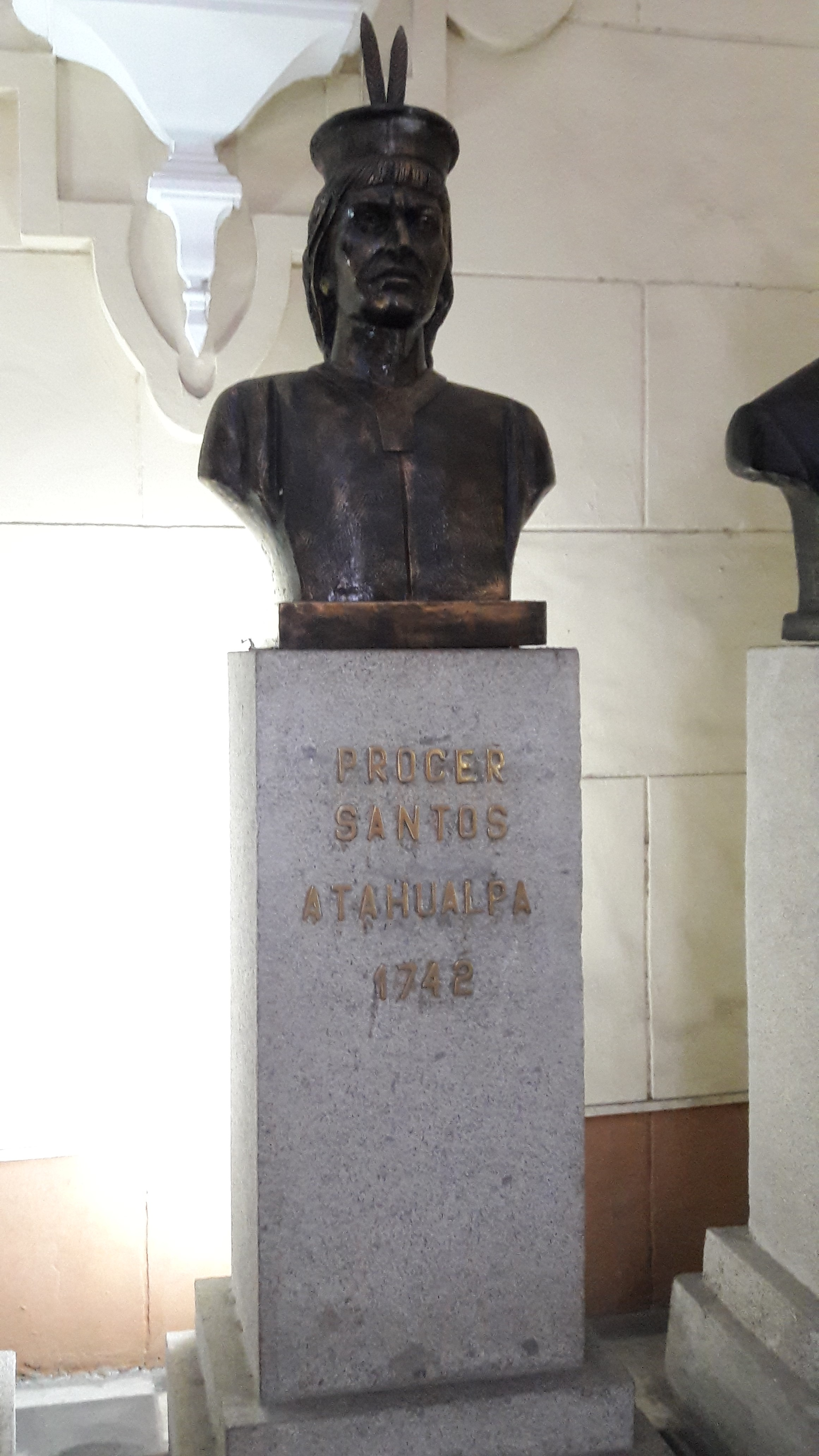
Effigy of Juan Santos Atahualpa in the Panteón de los Próceres in Lima.

The date and circumstances of the death of Juan Santos are unknown. After his capture of Andamarca in 1752, he disappeared. Most Spanish sources believe that he died in 1755 or 1756, although a Franciscan priest thought that he was still alive in 1775. In 1766, two Asháninka followers of Santos said that "his body had disappeared in a cloud of smoke". A small pile of rocks on the Cerro de la Sal commemorates him.

In 1788, the Spanish endeavored once again to enter the territory that the Santos rebellion had wrested from them. The Spanish established two fortresses on the southern edge of the Chanchamayo region in Vitoc and Uchubamba. However, not until 1868 and the founding of the city of La Merced (near the old Franciscan mission of Quimiri) were most of the Chanchamayo and the Cerro de la Sal regions opened up to settlement by non-indigenous people.

== Bibliography ==
- Andean Worlds - Indigenous History, Culture, and Consciousness Under Spanish Rule, 1532–1825, Kenneth J. Andrien, 2001, University of New Mexico Press, ISBN 0-8263-2359-6
