= Satipo =

Satipo may refer to:

== Geography ==
- Satipo (town)
- Satipo District
- Satipo Province
- Satipo Airport
- Satipo River, near Satipo Airport; tributary of Amazon River

== Other ==
- Satipo (Indiana Jones), fictional character
