= Satipo Airport =

Airport in Peru

- IATA: none; ICAO: SPIP

Summary
- Airport type: Public
- Serves: Satipo
- Elevation AMSL: 2,099 ft / 640 m
- Coordinates: 11°15′45″S 74°38′52″W

Map
- Location of the airport in Peru

Runways
Direction	Length		Surface
Direction	m	ft	Surface
05/23	510	1,673	Grass
- Source: GCM HERE/Nokia Maps

Satipo Airport (ICAO: SPIP) is an airstrip adjacent to the town of Satipo in the Junín Region of Peru. The runway parallels highway 24A as it enters the southwestern edge of town. The location is in the valley of the Satipo River, with nearby mountainous terrain to the north and south.

Google Earth Historical Imagery dated December 1969 shows a 1,180 metres (3,870 ft) runway. Later imagery shows buildings, trees, and concrete walls have cut the unobstructed length to 510 metres (1,670 ft), with the southwestern end being used for agricultural purposes.

Aviation services are available to Satipo at the Mayor Pnp Nancy Flore Airport 18 kilometres (11 mi) away in Mazamari.

== See also ==
- Transport in Peru
- List of airports in Peru
