= José Antonio de Mendoza, 3rd Marquis of Villagarcía =

Spanish colonial administrator

Don José Antonio de Mendoza Marqués de Villagarcía Caballero de Santiago
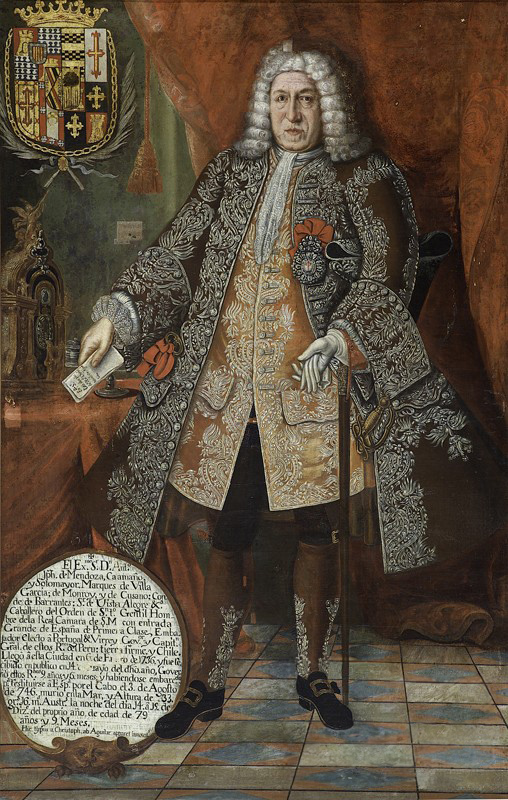

29th Viceroy of Peru
- In office 4 February 1736 – 15 December 1745
- Monarch: Philip V
- Preceded by: José de Armendáriz
- Succeeded by: José Manso de Velasco

Personal details
- Born: 1667 Galicia, Spain
- Died: 17 December 1746 (aged 78–79) off coast of Cape Horn, Chile
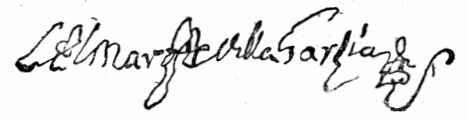
- Signature

José Antonio de Mendoza Caamaño y Sotomayor, 3rd Marquis of Villagarcía de Arousa (sometimes marqués de Villa García) (1667 – 17 December 1746]) was a Spanish colonial administrator in the Americas. From 4 February 1736 to 15 December 1745 he was Viceroy of Peru.

== Early career ==
José Antonio de Mendoza was a native of Galicia and a knight of the Order of Santiago. He had been ambassador to Venice and viceroy of Catalonia when King Philip V named him Viceroy of Peru in 1735. He took office in Lima, the capital of the Viceroyalty of Peru the following year, at the age of 68 in 1736.

During his administration, war between Spain and England again broke out, the War of Jenkins' Ear, 1739–1748. Viceroy Mendoza organized the defense of the Pacific coast and improved the army and the militia. In 1742 he dispatched a fleet from the port of El Callao to go to defend the coast of Chile.

== Scientists ==
In 1736 Spanish scientists Jorge Juan y Santacilia and Antonio de Ulloa, sent by the French Academy on a French Geodesic Mission to measure a degree of meridian arc at the equator, arrived in the Viceroyalty colony. Jorge Juan y Santacilia had sailed on the same ship as Viceroy Mendoza. On their return, they reported on the disorganization and corruption in the government and smuggling. The report was posthumously published under the title Noticias Secretas de Américas (Secret News From Americas). Smuggling increased again during this period. The practice was so profitable that merchants were willing to accept the risks

Another French influence on science in the colony was Louis Godin, another member of the meridian expedition. He was appointed cosmógrafo mayor by Viceroy Mendoza. The duties of cosmógrafo mayor included publishing almanacs and sailing instructions. Other French scientists in Peru at this time were Charles Marie de La Condamine and Pierre Bouguer.

== Later career ==
During Mendoza's tenure as Viceroy, an Indigenous revolt led by Juan Santos Atahualpa broke out in 1742. This revolt, known as the Juan Santos Rebellion was supported by all the jungle Indians in the Yungas region, and also had support from some mountain Indians like the Quechua. This rebellion was the largest war between Spain and Peruvian Indians since the Conquest of the Incas in the 1500s. Viceroy Mendoza was unable to quell the rebellion, and he left his successor José de Velasco to deal with it.

In that jungle reside the Indians, more like wild beasts than rational beings. There they maintain themselves by fishing and hunting, without joining together in civil company, here scattered in low dwellings that they make from trees on a site that seems right to them. And they move at their fancy, they mock great force through their flight, because there isn't a river, no matter how swift, that they can't swim across like fishes, nor jungle, no matter how great and tangled, that they can't penetrate like wild animals. And they themselves find the most pleasurable foods in the vermin, vipers, and filthy animals that abound there. And all they plant, by clearing a little of the forest, is the seed of maize and other roots that there are called yucas, which serve as their bread. There they have weapons in the very trees, from which they fashion their arrows and clubs or spears that they make from chonta, which is a hard and heavy wood, capable of considerable sharpness, that they use with agility and dexterity. They dress in no other clothes than a spreading garment that they call cushma, which covers their entire body and which they make from the great quantities of cotton produced there... Invading the barbarians in the jungle would be the same as wanting to punish or capture the beasts of the forest, where nature itself has given them unconquerable protection.

— Viceroy Mendoza describing the difficulty of fighting the Juan Santos Rebellion in a letter to King Philip V in 1744

In 1740 the Viceroyalty of New Granada was separated from the Viceroyalty of Peru. It had been temporarily separated earlier, from 1717 to 1724 . The new viceroyalty included the territories of Bogotá, Quito, Panama and Venezuela, and also a few territories more directly connected to Lima – Maynas, Jaén, Tumbes and Guayaquil.

== Death ==
Viceroy Mendoza was relieved of his Peruvian office in 1745. Mendoza died at sea on his voyage back to Spain in 1746.

== See also ==
- Viceroyalty of Peru
- List of Viceroys of Peru
- Indigenous peoples of the Americas
- Spanish colonization of the Americas

Government offices
Preceded by José de Armendáriz	Viceroy of Peru; 1736–1745	Succeeded by José Manso de Velasco
