= MZA =

MZA may refer to:

- Madrid, Zaragoza and Alicante railway, a defunct Spanish railway company
- Mayor Pnp Nancy Flore Airport (IATA code), Mazamari, Peru
- Zacatepec Mixtec (ISO code), a Mixtec language of Oaxaca, Mexico
