= Coviriali District =

Coviriali
- District
- Location in Peru
- Coordinates: 11°17′28″S 74°37′41″W
- Country: Peru
- Region: Junín
- Province: Satipo
- Founded: March 26, 1965
- Capital: Coviriali

Area
  - Total: 97.6 km^{2} (37.7 sq mi)
- Elevation: 675 m (2,215 ft)

Population (2017 census)
  - Total: 6,248
  - Density: 64.0/km^{2} (166/sq mi)
- Time zone: UTC-5 (PET)
- UBIGEO: 120602
- Website: "City Population," , accessed 7 Aug 2020

Coviriali District is one of nine districts of Satipo Province in the Department of Junín, Peru. The town of Coviriali, the capital of the district, had a population of 338 in 2017 and is located 4 kilometres (2.5 miles) south of the provincial capital of Satipo.

Coviriali has a tropical rainforest climate similar to that of nearby Satipo. The annual average temperature in Satipo, which varies little from month to month, is 22.9 °C (73.2 °F) and annual precipitation is 1,879 millimetres (74.0 in). Precipitation is adequate in all months although less is received in the austral winter months of June through August. Coviriali's climate under the Köppen Classification is Af (borderline Am, tropical monsoon). In the mountains of the district the climate above about 1,500 metres (4,900 ft) in elevation becomes Cfb (sub-tropical, warm but not hot year round).
