= Asháninka Communal Reserve =

Coordinates: 11.7790°S 73.4547°W

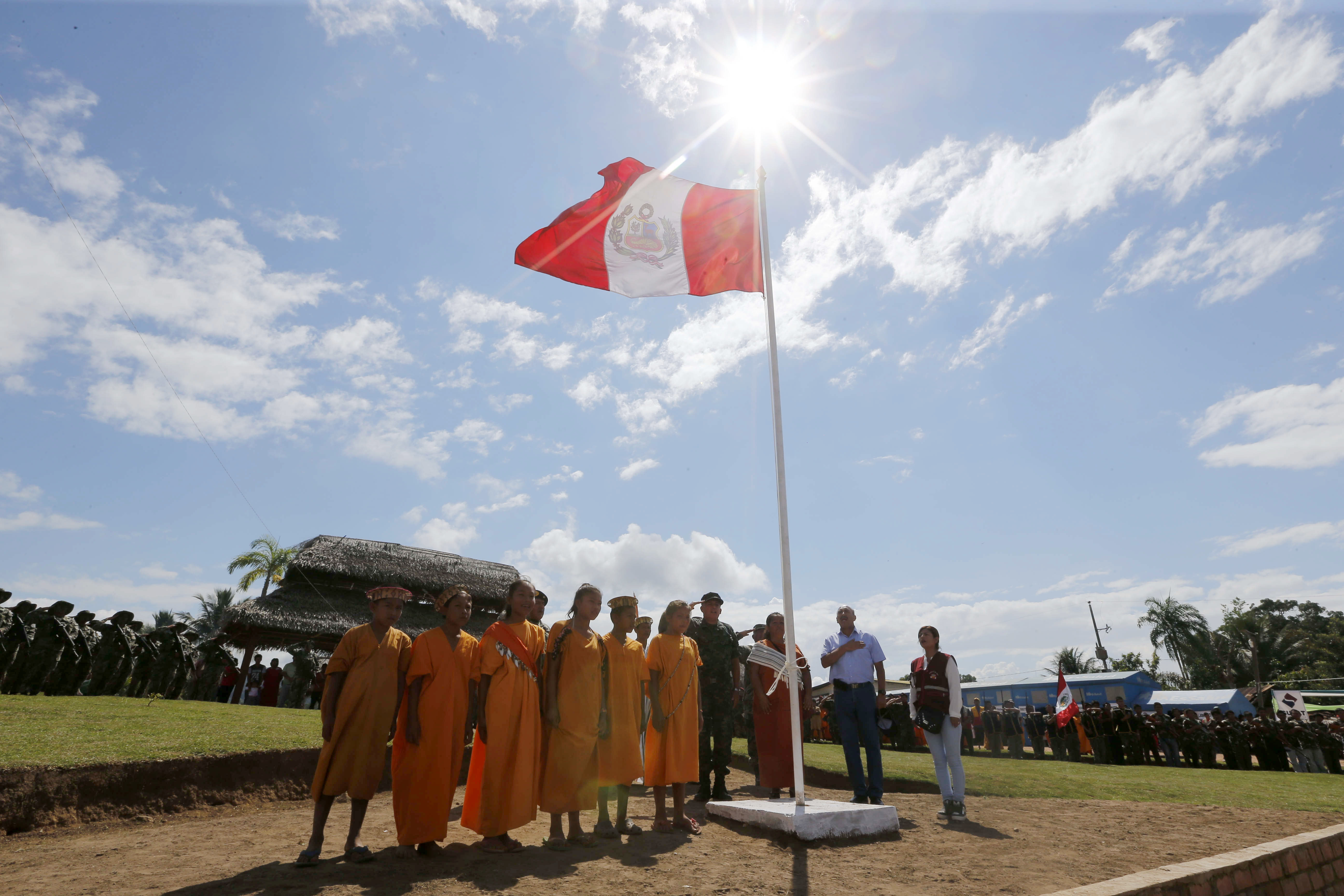

The Asháninka Communal Reserve (Reserva Comunal Asháninka) is a protected area in Peru located in the Junín Region, Satipo Province, Río Tambo District.

According to the government of Peru, the reserve is 712.24 square miles in size.

== See also ==
- Asháninka
- Natural and Cultural Peruvian Heritage
