= Challwamayu (Junín) =

- Etymology: Quechua

Location
- Country: Peru
- Region: Junín Region

Physical characteristics
- Mouth: Mazamari
  - coordinates: 11°22′49″S 74°34′32″W

Challwamayu (Quechua challwa 'fish', mayu 'river', "fish river", hispaniciced spelling Chalhuamayo) is a river in Peru located in the Junín Region, Satipo Province, Llaylla District.
