= Mariposa, Satipo province =

Coordinates: 11°24′S 74°45′W

The town of Mariposa is the capital of the Pampa Hermosa District in Satipo Province, Peru.

== See also ==
- Administrative divisions of Peru
