= Llaylla District =

Llaylla
- District
- Interactive map of Llaylla
- Coordinates: 11°23′S 74°35′W
- Country: Peru
- Region: Junín
- Province: Satipo
- Founded: March 26, 1965
- Capital: Llaylla

Government
  - Mayor: Isaac Faustino Martinez Huari

Area
  - Total: 180.39 km^{2} (69.65 sq mi)
- Elevation: 1,100 m (3,600 ft)

Population (2005 census)
  - Total: 4,444
  - Density: 24.64/km^{2} (63.81/sq mi)
- Time zone: UTC-5 (PET)
- UBIGEO: 120603

Llaylla District is one of eight districts of the province Satipo in Peru.

== See also ==
- Challwamayu
