= Pampa Hermosa District, Satipo =

Coordinates: 11.4027°S 74.7580°W

Pampa Hermosa
- District
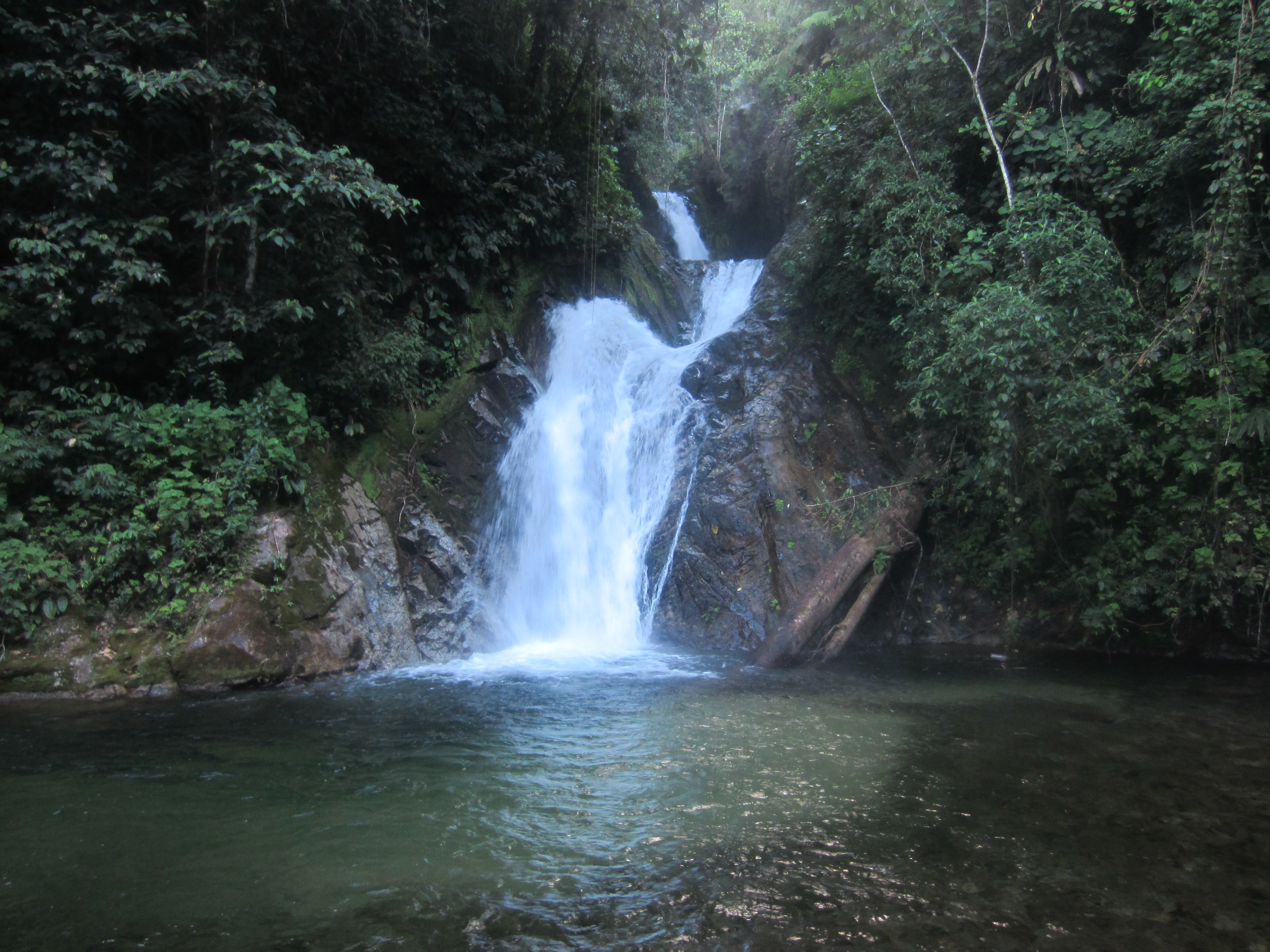
- Catarata de Cristal, Pampa Hermosa District
- Interactive map of Pampa Hermosa
- Country: Peru
- Region: Junín
- Province: Satipo
- Founded: March 26, 1965
- Capital: Mariposa

Government
  - Mayor: Grudy Victor Galindo Pariona

Area
  - Total: 566.82 km^{2} (218.85 sq mi)
- Elevation: 1,200 m (3,900 ft)

Population (2005 census)
  - Total: 6,459
  - Density: 11.40/km^{2} (29.51/sq mi)
- Time zone: UTC-5 (PET)
- UBIGEO: 120605

Pampa Hermosa District is one of eight districts of the province Satipo in Peru.
