= Satipo District =

Coordinates: 11.2499°S 74.6423°W

Satipo
- District
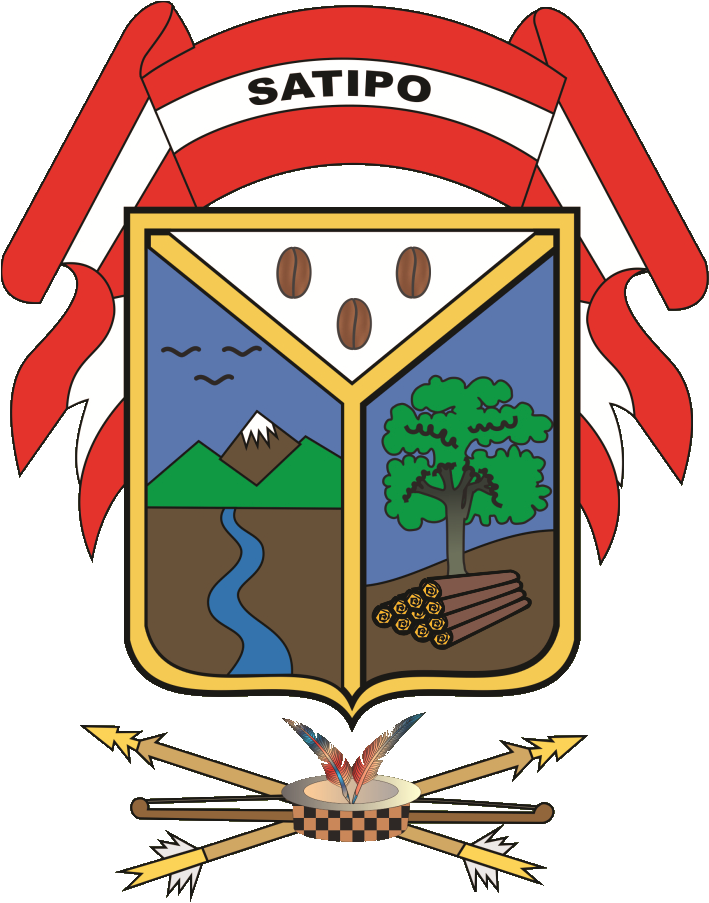
- Coat of arms
- Interactive map of Satipo
- Country: Peru
- Region: Junín
- Province: Satipo
- Founded: December 18, 1940
- Capital: Satipo

Government
  - Mayor: Cesar Augusto Merea Tello

Area
  - Total: 732.02 km^{2} (282.63 sq mi)
- Elevation: 632 m (2,073 ft)

Population (2017)
  - Total: 41,939
  - Density: 57.292/km^{2} (148.39/sq mi)
- Time zone: UTC-5 (PET)
- UBIGEO: 120601

Satipo District is one of eight districts of the Satipo Province in Peru.

== Climate ==
Climate data for Satipo, elevation 577 m (1,893 ft), (1991–2020)
Month	Jan	Feb	Mar	Apr	May	Jun	Jul	Aug	Sep	Oct	Nov	Dec	Year
Mean daily maximum °C (°F)	30.7 (87.3)	30.4 (86.7)	30.8 (87.4)	31.4 (88.5)	30.0 (86.0)	30.9 (87.6)	31.2 (88.2)	32.1 (89.8)	32.4 (90.3)	32.4 (90.3)	32.2 (90.0)	30.8 (87.4)	31.3 (88.3)
Mean daily minimum °C (°F)	19.8 (67.6)	19.7 (67.5)	19.6 (67.3)	19.4 (66.9)	18.8 (65.8)	17.7 (63.9)	16.7 (62.1)	16.8 (62.2)	17.6 (63.7)	18.8 (65.8)	19.5 (67.1)	19.6 (67.3)	18.7 (65.6)
Average precipitation mm (inches)	307.5 (12.11)	293.1 (11.54)	248.1 (9.77)	144.6 (5.69)	86.8 (3.42)	75.6 (2.98)	61.6 (2.43)	96.2 (3.79)	108.0 (4.25)	175.4 (6.91)	169.1 (6.66)	247.0 (9.72)	2,013 (79.27)
Source: National Meteorology and Hydrology Service of Peru
