= Satipo province =

Province in Junín, Peru

Satipo Province
- Province
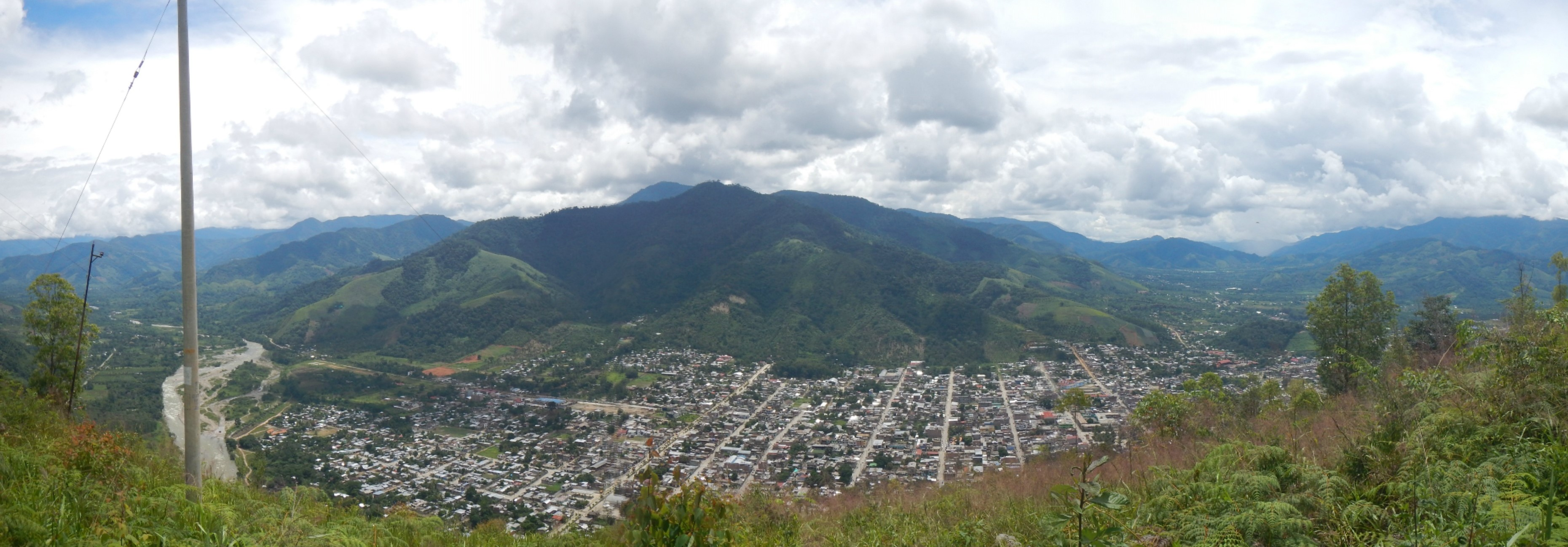
- Aerial of Satipo City

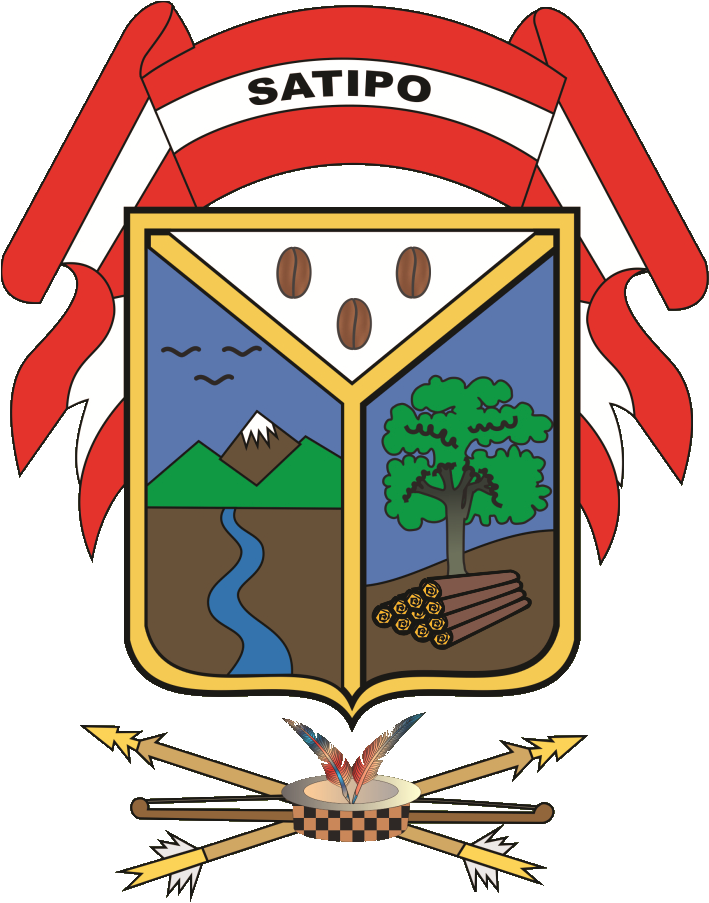
- Coat of arms

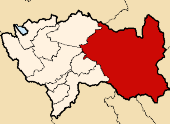
- Location of Satipo Province in the Junín Region
- Country: Peru
- Region: Junín
- Founded: March 26, 1965
- Capital: Satipo

Government
  - Mayor: Olivera Meza (2019-2022)

Area
  - Total: 19,219.48 km^{2} (7,420.68 sq mi)

Population
  - Total: 203,985
  - Density: 10.6135/km^{2} (27.4887/sq mi)

Satipo is the largest and easternmost province in the Junín Region, located in the central Amazon rainforest of Peru. Its capital is the town of Satipo.

== Geography ==
The province of Satipo borders the provinces of Huancayo, Concepción, Jauja and Chanchamayo on the west; Pasco Region's province of Oxapampa on the north; the province of Atalaya in the Ucayali Region on the northwest; and Cusco Region's province of La Convención on the east and southeast. The Mantaro River marks the province's border with province of Huanta in the Ayacucho Region on the south and with the province of Tayacaja in Huancavelica Region on the southwest.

Elevations and climates in Satipo range from the Amazon Basin tropical rainforest climate along the Tambo River near Atalaya at an elevation of 207 m (679 ft) to Nevado Bateadora with an elevation of 4,866 m (15,965 ft) near the hamlet of Toldopampa in the Andes.

== History ==
The first inhabitants of the present-day province of Satipo were the Asháninkas, Piros, Amueshas, Nomatsiguengas, Simirinches, Amewakas, Cakintis, among others. They left a legacy of petroglyphs which are believed to be from more than 3500 years ago. Ceramics, stone and golden axes, as well as many constructions show that the area was also inhabited by the Incas. Many battles were fought between the Incas and the other natives, whose extensive knowledge of the jungle helped them win.

The first Europeans arrived in the province's territory in 1673, when the Franciscans founded Santa Cruz, their first settlement in the area.

Many Indian uprisings happened during the 18th century.

President Manuel Prado created the Satipo District as part of the province of Jauja on September 18, 1940.

On November 1, 1947, a strong earthquake destroyed the city, causing entire settlements to disappear. Satipo could not be reached by land and remained isolated until 1960.

The district of Satipo was elevated to the provincial status by President Fernando Belaúnde Terry on March 26, 1965.

During the late 1980s, the province was hit hard by terrorism and caused a massive exodus from the province. Many persons were killed by terrorists, including the Mayor of Satipo, Fidel Juarez Torres.

== Political divisions ==
The province is divided into nine districts (Spanish: distritos, singular: distrito), each of which is headed by a mayor (alcalde):

Districts of Satipo
| District | Capital | Area | Population (1993) | Population (2017) | elevation (of capital) | coordinates (of capital) |
|---|---|---|---|---|---|---|
| Coviriali | Coviriali | 98 km^{2} (38 sq mi) | 3,457 | 6,248 | 675 m (2,215 ft) | 11.291°S 74.627°W |
| Llaylla | Llaylla | 308 km^{2} (119 sq mi) | 3,168 | 6,936 | 1,108 m (3,635 ft) | 11.381°S 74.591°W |
| Mazamari | Mazamari | 2,134 km^{2} (824 sq mi) | 12,487 | 40,211 | 661 m (2,169 ft) | 11.325°S 74.580°W |
| Pampa Hermosa | Mariposa | 951 km^{2} (367 sq mi) | 3,543 | 4,090 | 1,232 m (4,042 ft) | 11.404°S 74.752°W |
| Pangoa | San Martin de Pangoa | 3,536 km^{2} (1,365 sq mi) | 20,603 | 60,883 | 775 m (2,543 ft) | 11.428°S 74.448°W |
| Rio Negro | Rio Negro | 488 km^{2} (188 sq mi) | 18,772 | 32,304 | 644 m (2,113 ft) | 11.208°S 74.660°W |
| Rio Tambo | Puerto Ocopa | 10,213 km^{2} (3,943 sq mi) | 9,155 | 29,131 | 330 m (1,080 ft) | 11.144°S 74.308°W |
| Satipo | Satipo | 816 km^{2} (315 sq mi) | 23,605 | 41,050 | 628 m (2,060 ft) | 11.254°S 74.637°W |
| Vizcatán del Ene | San Miquel del Ene | 608 km^{2} (235 sq mi) | n.a. | 4,765 | 469 m (1,539 ft) | 12.214°S 74.016°W |
| Total: Satipo | Satipo | 19,219 km^{2} (7,420 sq mi) | 94,250 | 225,618 | 628 m (2,060 ft) | 11.254°S 74.637°W |

== Gallery ==
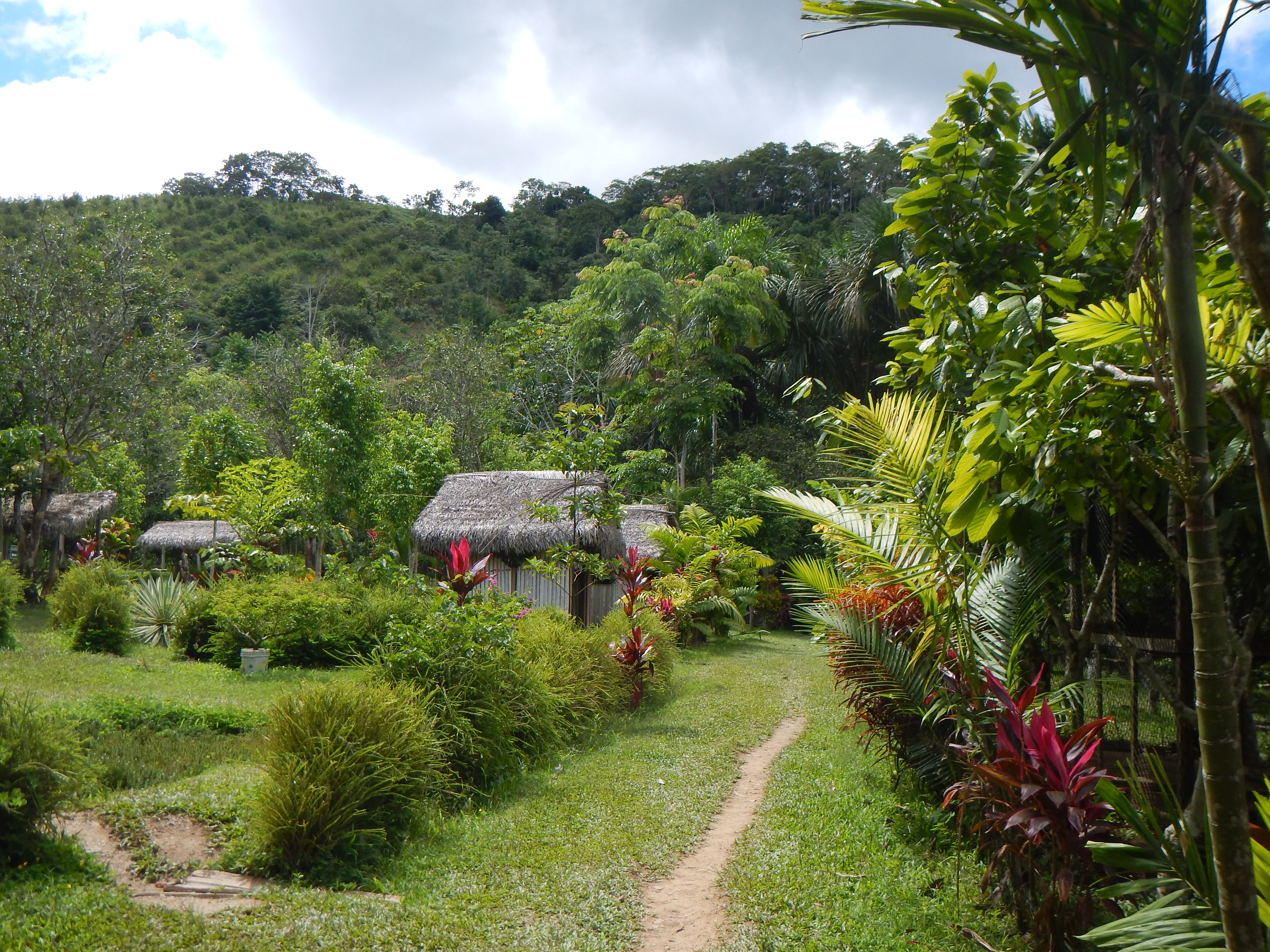
Zoo in Satipo.

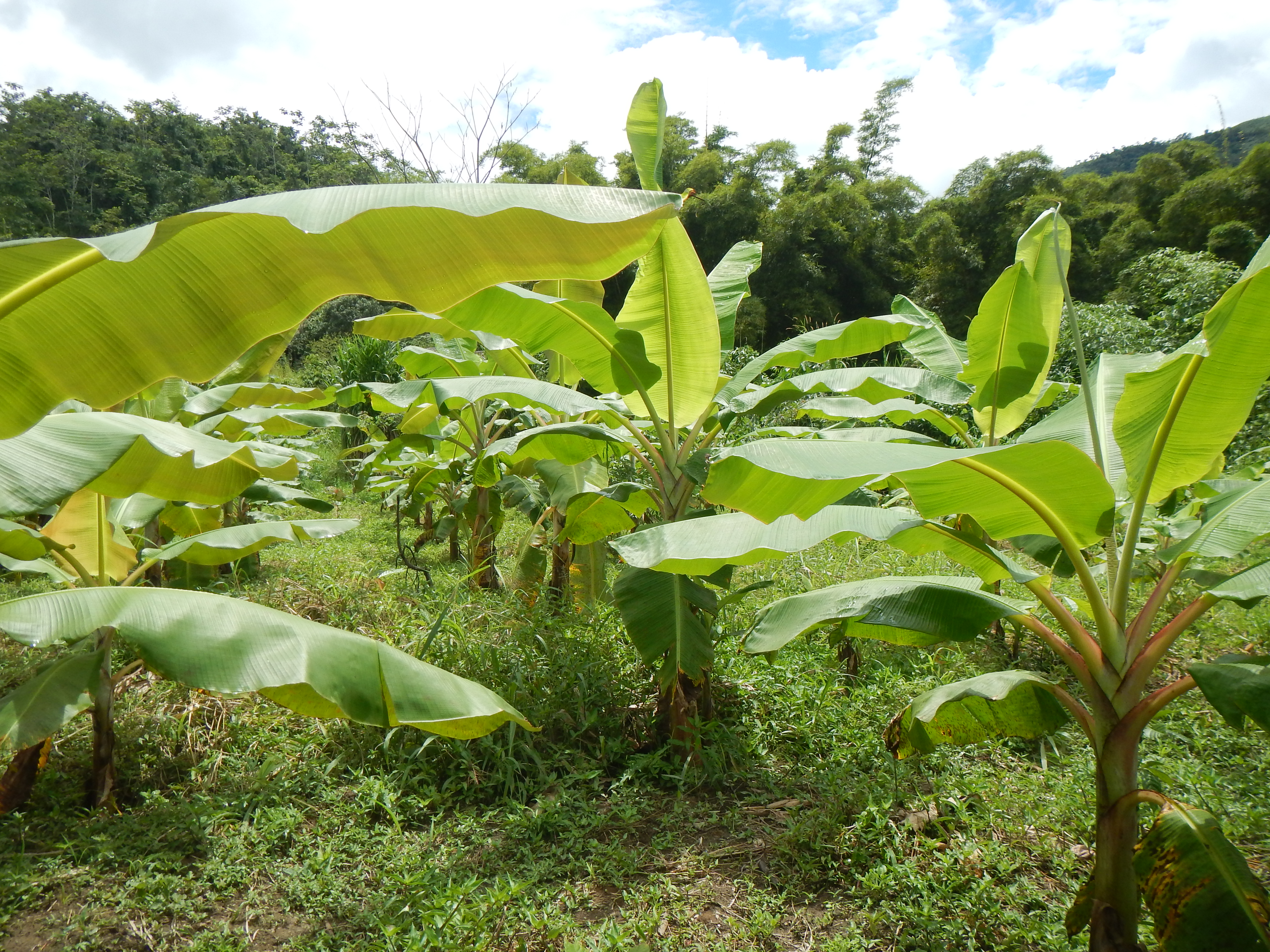
Banana farm.

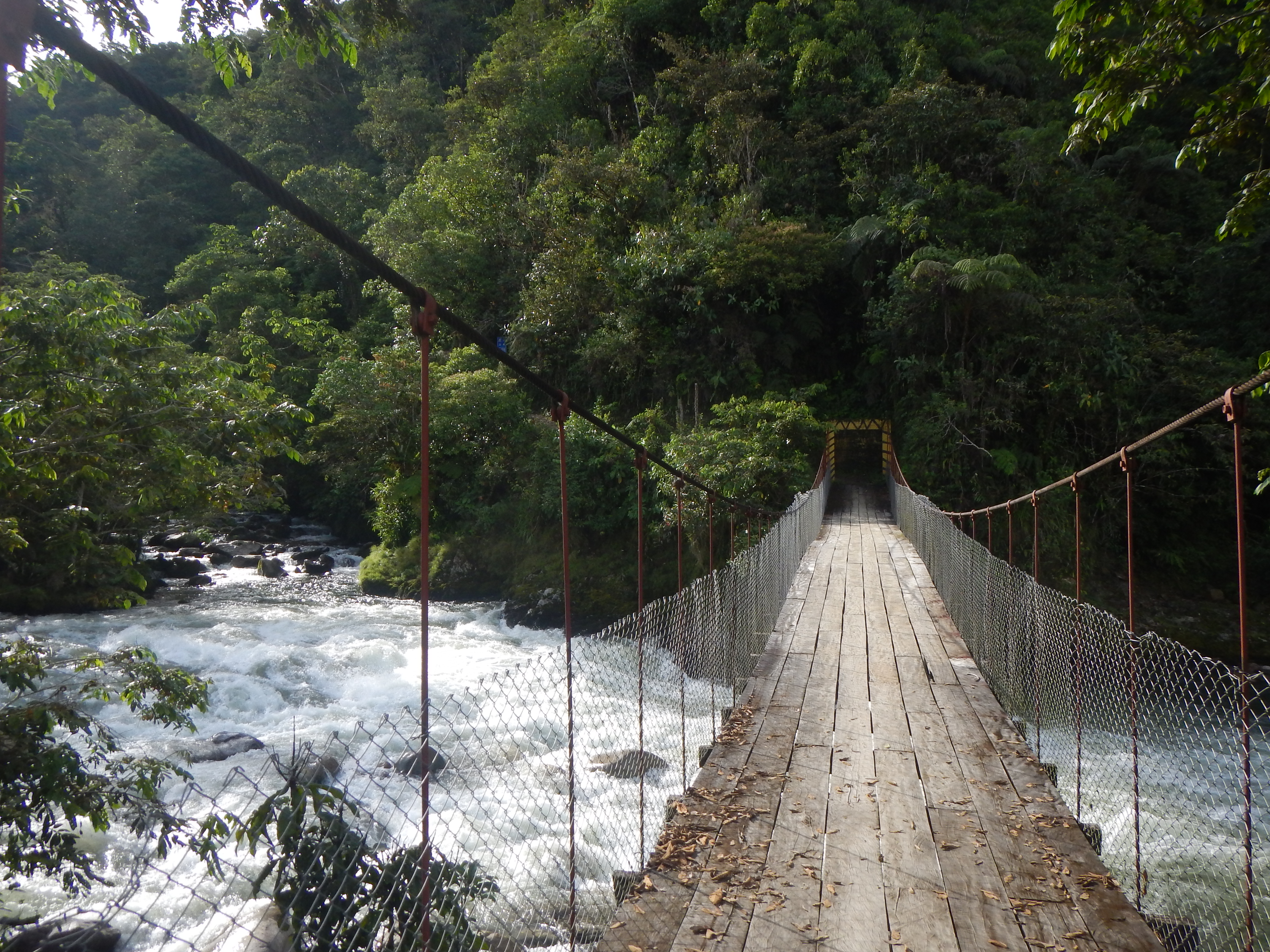
Public lands bridge.

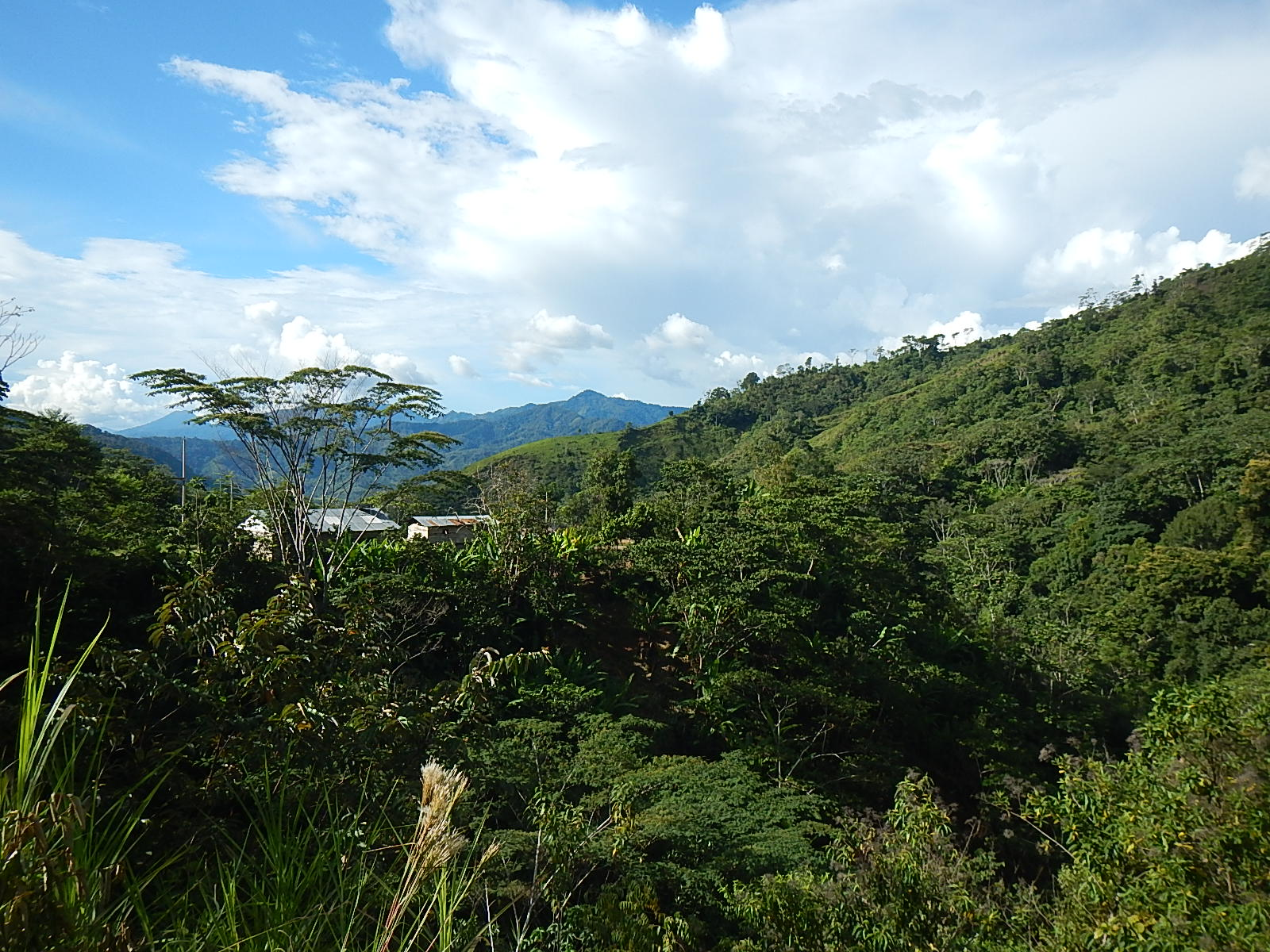
Jungle overview

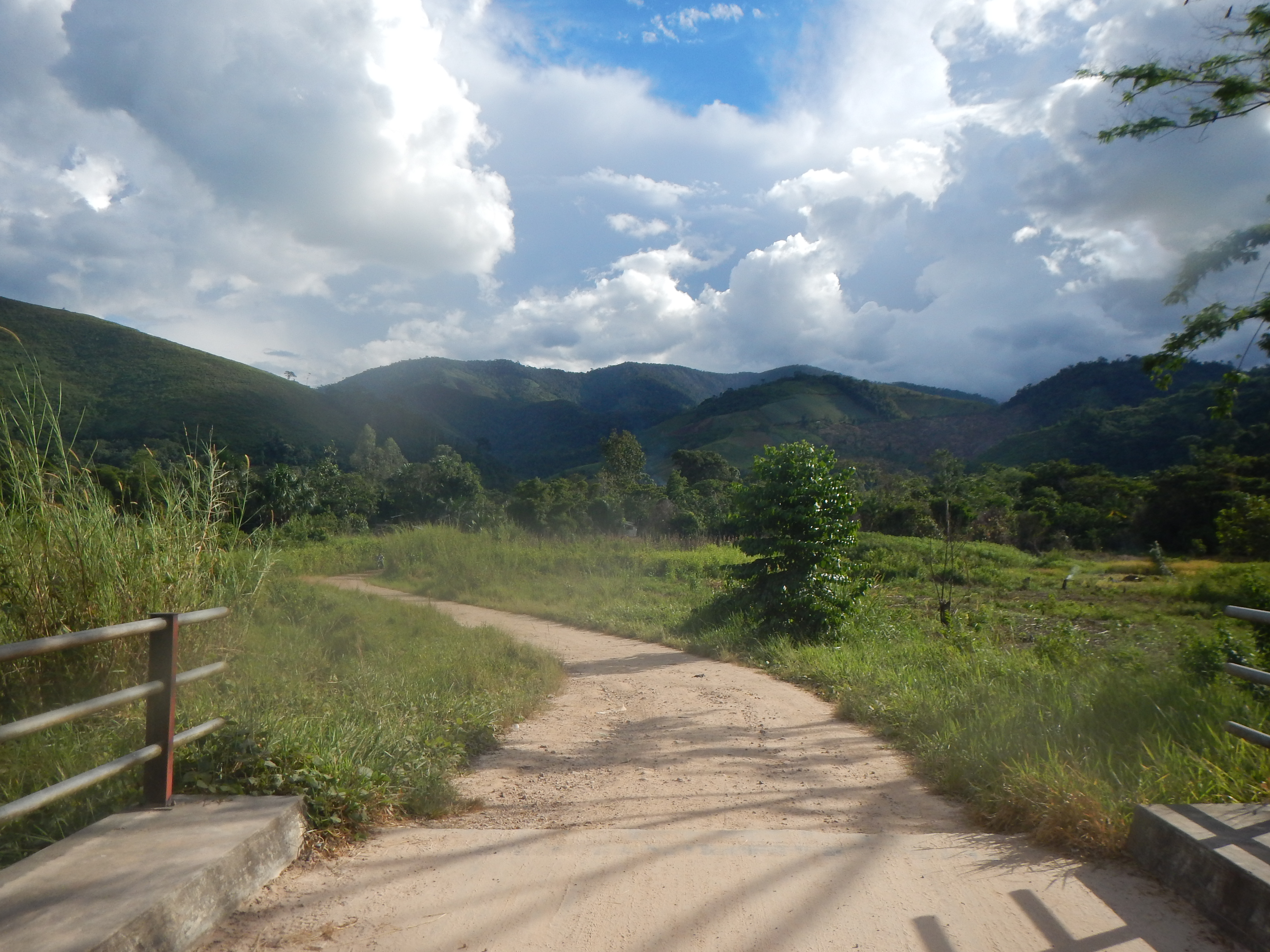
Typical farm in Satipo.

== See also ==
- Asháninka Communal Reserve
- Challwamayu
- Otishi National Park
