= Río Tambo District =

Coordinates: 11.1433°S 74.3135°W

Río Tambo
- District
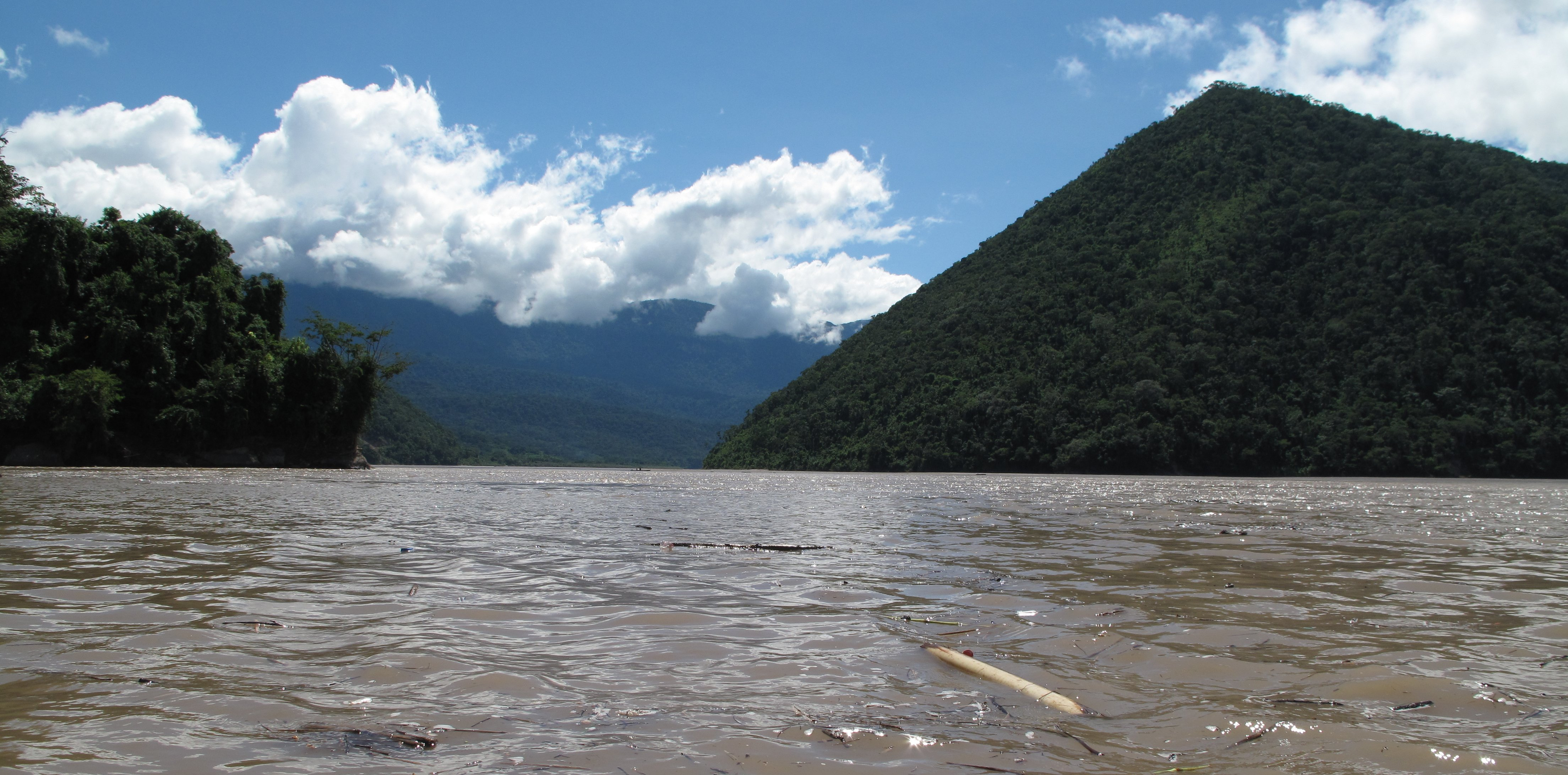
- View of the Tambo River near Puerto Prado
- Interactive map of Río Tambo
- Country: Peru
- Region: Junín
- Province: Satipo
- Founded: January 29, 1943
- Capital: Puerto Ocopa

Government
  - Mayor: Ivan Cisneros Quispe

Area
  - Total: 10,349.9 km^{2} (3,996.1 sq mi)
- Elevation: 275 m (902 ft)

Population (2005 census)
  - Total: 27,793
  - Density: 2.6853/km^{2} (6.9550/sq mi)
- Time zone: UTC-5 (PET)
- UBIGEO: 120608

Río Tambo District is one of eight districts of the province Satipo of Peru.

== Climate ==
Climate data for Puerto Ocopa, Rio Tambo, elevation 319 m (1,047 ft), (1991–2020)
Month	Jan	Feb	Mar	Apr	May	Jun	Jul	Aug	Sep	Oct	Nov	Dec	Year
Mean daily maximum °C (°F)	31.7 (89.1)	31.4 (88.5)	31.9 (89.4)	32.4 (90.3)	32.2 (90.0)	31.9 (89.4)	32.5 (90.5)	34.1 (93.4)	34.7 (94.5)	34.1 (93.4)	34.0 (93.2)	32.0 (89.6)	32.7 (90.9)
Mean daily minimum °C (°F)	21.8 (71.2)	21.8 (71.2)	21.7 (71.1)	21.4 (70.5)	20.7 (69.3)	20.0 (68.0)	19.0 (66.2)	19.2 (66.6)	20.1 (68.2)	21.1 (70.0)	21.5 (70.7)	21.7 (71.1)	20.8 (69.5)
Average precipitation mm (inches)	147.7 (5.81)	137.2 (5.40)	103.6 (4.08)	47.6 (1.87)	28.4 (1.12)	21.0 (0.83)	22.4 (0.88)	24.7 (0.97)	37.8 (1.49)	58.3 (2.30)	67.3 (2.65)	150.9 (5.94)	846.9 (33.34)
Source: National Meteorology and Hydrology Service of Peru

== See also ==
- Asháninka Communal Reserve
- Gran Pajonal
- Otishi National Park
