= Perené District =

Coordinates: 10.9496°S 75.2268°W

Perené
- District
- Coat of arms

- Location of Perené in the Chanchamayo province
- Country: Peru
- Region: Junín
- Province: Chanchamayo
- Founded: January 14, 1986
- Capital: Perené

Government
  - Mayor: Antonio Victor Roman Castillo

Area
  - Total: 1,224.16 km^{2} (472.65 sq mi)
- Elevation: 650 m (2,130 ft)

Population (2005 census)
  - Total: 49,781
  - Density: 40.665/km^{2} (105.32/sq mi)
- Time zone: UTC-5 (PET)
- UBIGEO: 120302
- Website: muniperene.gob.pe

Perené District is one of six districts of the province Chanchamayo in Peru.
