= Mayor Nancy Flores Páucar Airport =

Mayor PNP Nancy Flores Paucar Airport Manuel Prado Ugarteche Airport
- IATA: MZA; ICAO: SPMF

Summary
- Airport type: Public
- Owner: CORPAC
- Location: Mazamari, Peru
- Elevation AMSL: 2,180 ft / 664 m
- Coordinates: 11°19′30″S 74°32′10″W

Map
- Location of the airport in Peru

Runways
Direction	Length		Surface
Direction	m	ft	Surface
15/33	1,760	5,774	Asphalt
- Sources: SkyVector Google Maps

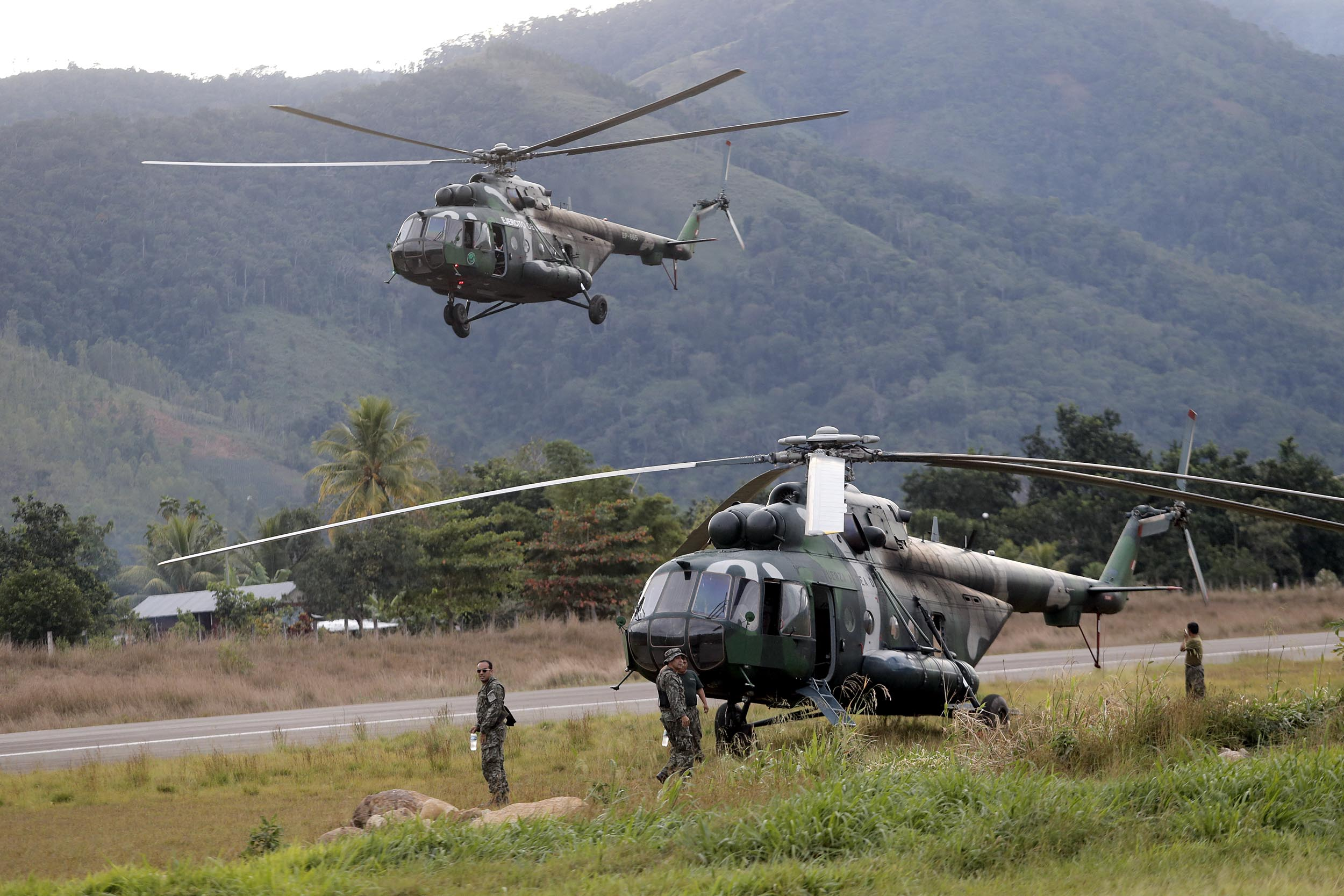
The Minister of Defense, Pedro Cateriano Bellido and the Minister of the Interior, Wilfredo Pedraza, arrive in the city of Mazamari to inspect the transfer of the remains of the terrorist commanders Alejandro Borda Casafranca "Camarada Alipio" and Marco Antonio Quispe Palomino "Camarada Gabriel", to the city of Lima

Mayor PNP Nancy Flores Paucar Airport (IATA: MZA, ICAO: SPMF) is an airport serving the municipality of Mazamari in Junin Region, Peru. The airport was formerly named Manuel Prado Ugarteche Airport.

== Airlines and destinations ==
Airlines	Destinations
Atsa Airlines	Lima

== See also ==
- Transport in Peru
- List of airports in Peru
