= Pichanal =

- Municipality and town
- Location within Argentina
- Coordinates: 23°19′S 64°13′W
- Country: Argentina
- Province: Salta
- Founded: April 23, 1912
- Elevation: 302 m (991 ft)

Population (2012)
  - Total: 30,903
- Time zone: UTC−3 (ART)
- ZIP: 4534
- Website: Official website

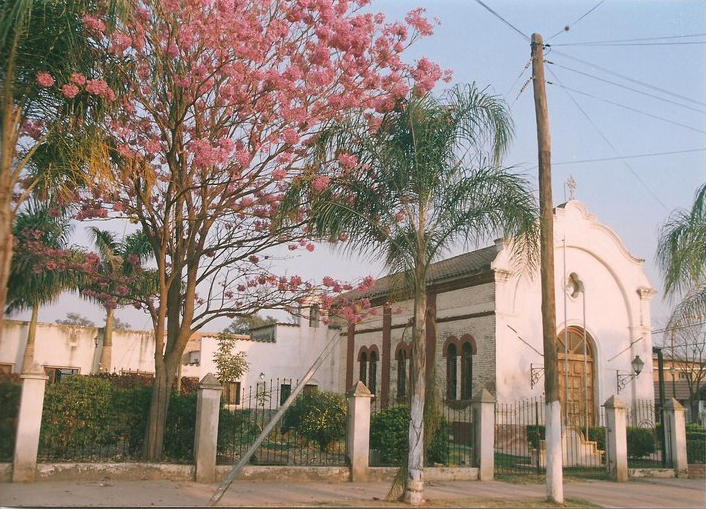
St. George Church in the City of Pichanal

Pichanal is a town and municipality in Orán Department, located in northeastern Salta Province, Argentina. It is connected to the national road network by National Route 34, and to nearby San Ramón de la Nueva Orán by National Route 50. It has economic significance because of its position as a junction on these routes. It is within the bounds of the Yungas Biosphere Reserve.

== History ==
The town emerged with the arrival of the railroad. At the time, it was a small trading area where people converged from different places to exchange their goods. On 4 January 1911, a railroad terminus was built at the spot that is now the city of Pichanal. With warehouses and camps, and all the feverish railway activity that was carried out at that point, it became the place of settlement for several residents of the Chaco de Rivadavia. The first train finally arrived on March 4, 1911.

In October of the same year, the construction of the railway bridge over the Bermejo River was completed. Three years later, the construction of the railway bridge over the Colorado River was completed, thus placing the housing conglomeration, now Pichanal, in a strategic place for commerce and population development. The population of Pichanal increased immediately due to the new sources of work that were now available to them.

In March 1912, the first educational institution, the Escuela Coronel Apolinario de Figueroa, was founded. It currently has an enrollment of more than 1,000 students. Its current director is Ms. Zunilda Morales of Valencia, deputy director Maria Rodriguez.

Every April 23, the city celebrates its patron saint festivities in honor of St. George.

== Sister cities ==
- Dikhil, Djibouti
