= Monobamba District =

Coordinates: 11.3583°S 75.3454°W

Monobamba
- District
- Coat of arms
- Interactive map of Monobamba
- Country: Peru
- Region: Junín
- Province: Jauja
- Founded: February 02, 1956
- Capital: Monobamba

Government
  - Mayor: Julio Cesar Mungi Nuñez

Area
  - Total: 295.83 km^{2} (114.22 sq mi)
- Elevation: 1,450 m (4,760 ft)

Population (2005 census)
  - Total: 1,698
  - Density: 5.740/km^{2} (14.87/sq mi)
- Time zone: UTC-5 (PET)
- UBIGEO: 120419
- Website: monobamba.gob.pe

Monobamba District is one of thirty-four districts of the province Jauja in Peru.

== See also ==
- Marayrasu
