= Pangoa District =

Coordinates: 11.4717°S 74.4829°W

Pangoa
- District
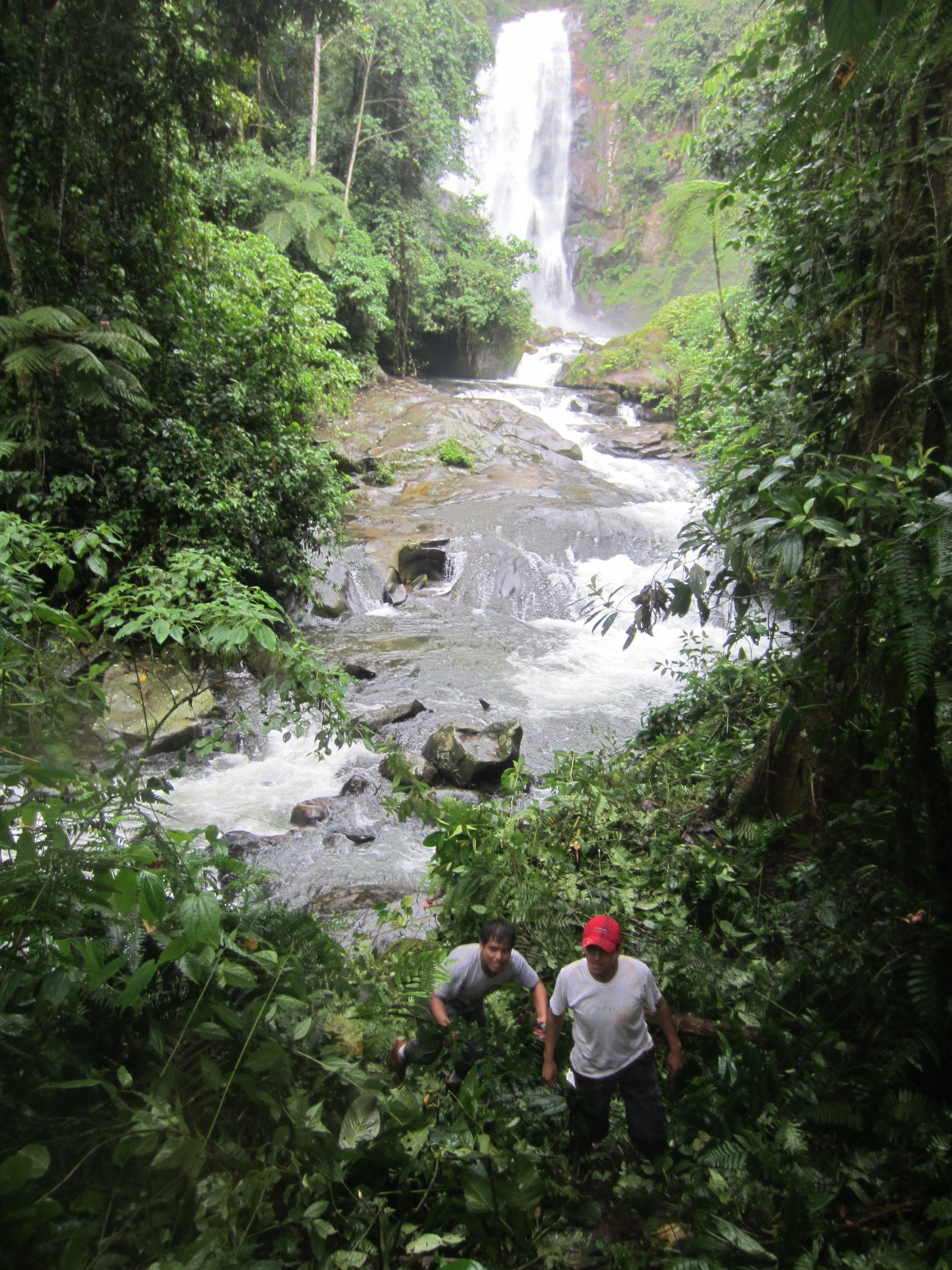
- Valle Sagrado waterfall, Pangoa District
- Interactive map of Pangoa
- Country: Peru
- Region: Junín
- Province: Satipo
- Capital: Pangoa

Government
  - Mayor: Oscar Villazana Rojas
- Time zone: UTC-5 (PET)
- UBIGEO: 120606

Pangoa District is one of eight districts of the province Satipo in Peru.
