= Mazamari District =

Coordinates: 11.3257°S 74.5358°W

Mazamari
- District
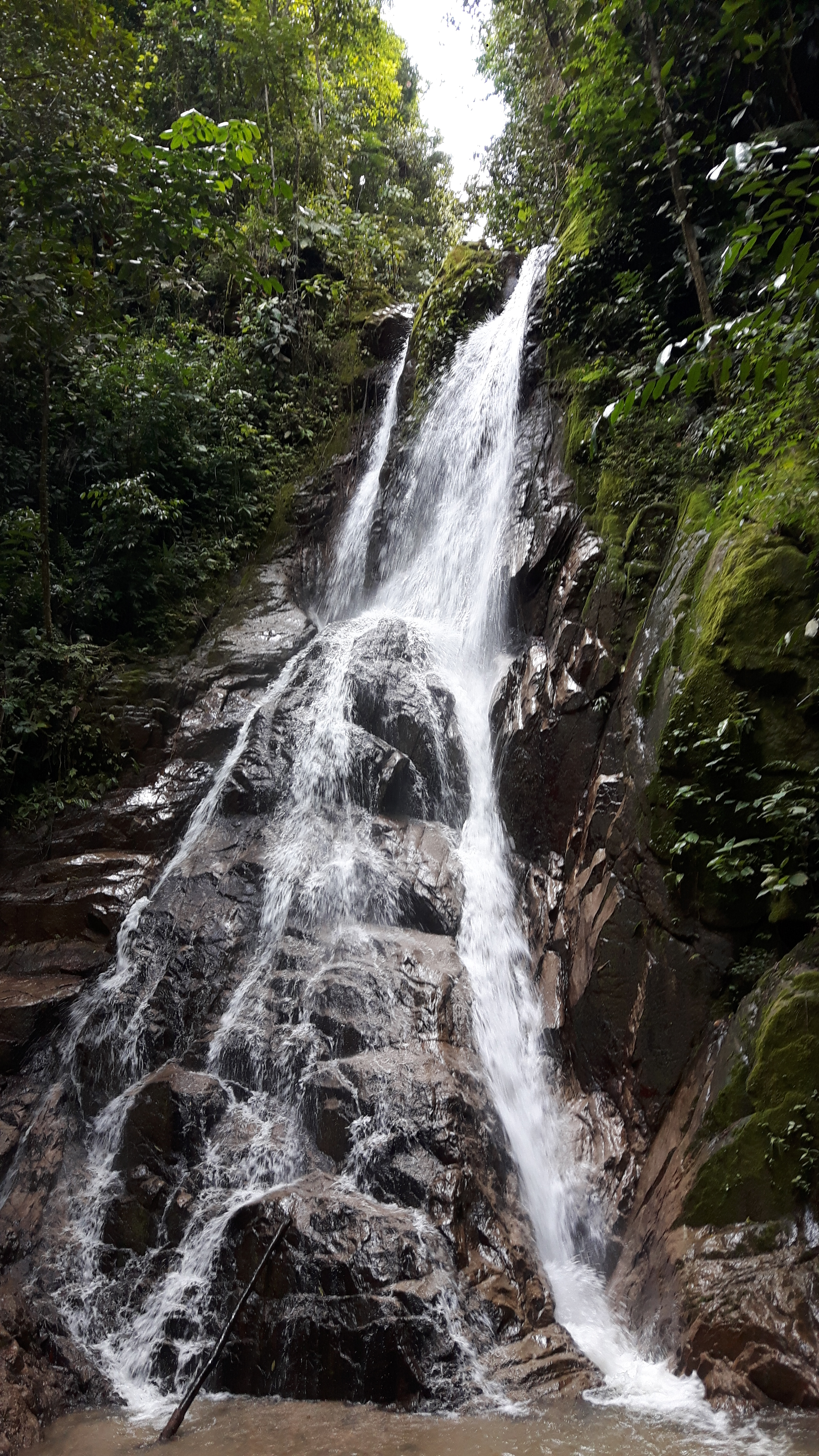
- Interactive map of Mazamari
- Country: Peru
- Region: Junín
- Province: Satipo
- Capital: Mazamari

Government
  - Mayor: Jorge Gabriel Sanchez Morveli
- Time zone: UTC-5 (PET)
- UBIGEO: 120604

Mazamari District is one of eight districts of the Satipo Province in Peru.

The homonymous city of Mazamari serves as the district's capital and is served by the Mayor Nancy Flores Páucar Airport. It also hosts the National Police's unit known as the Sinchis.
