= Satipo (town) =

- Town
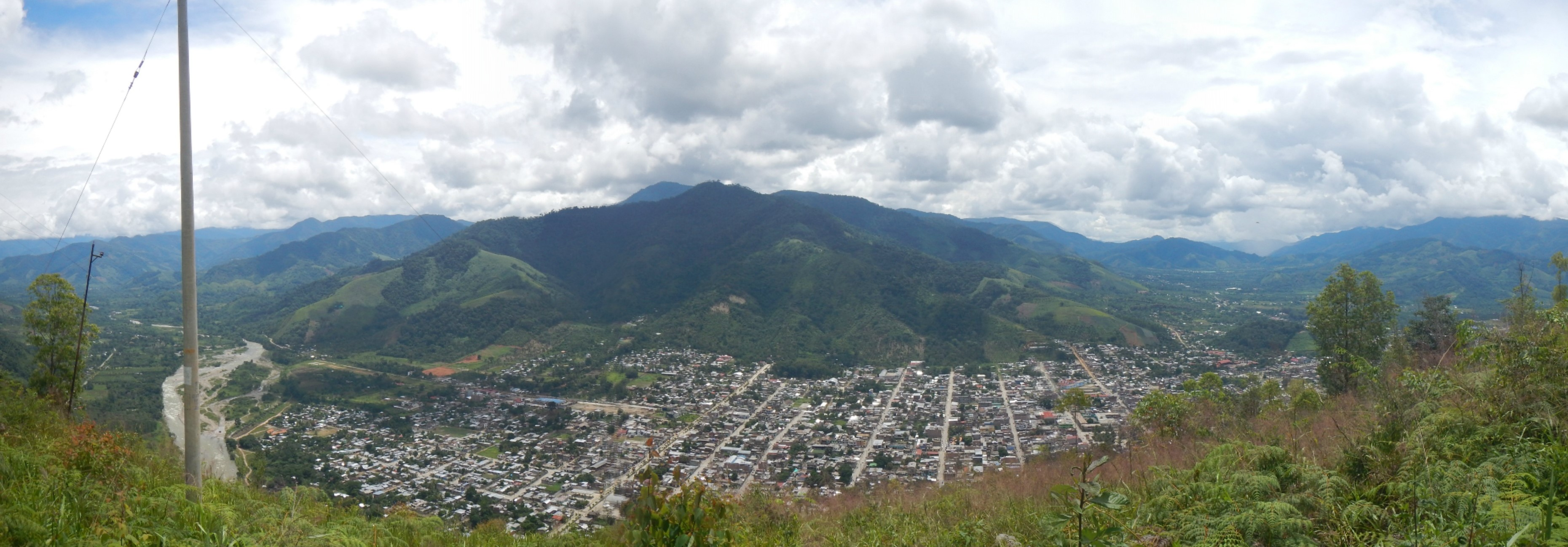
- Aerial view of the town

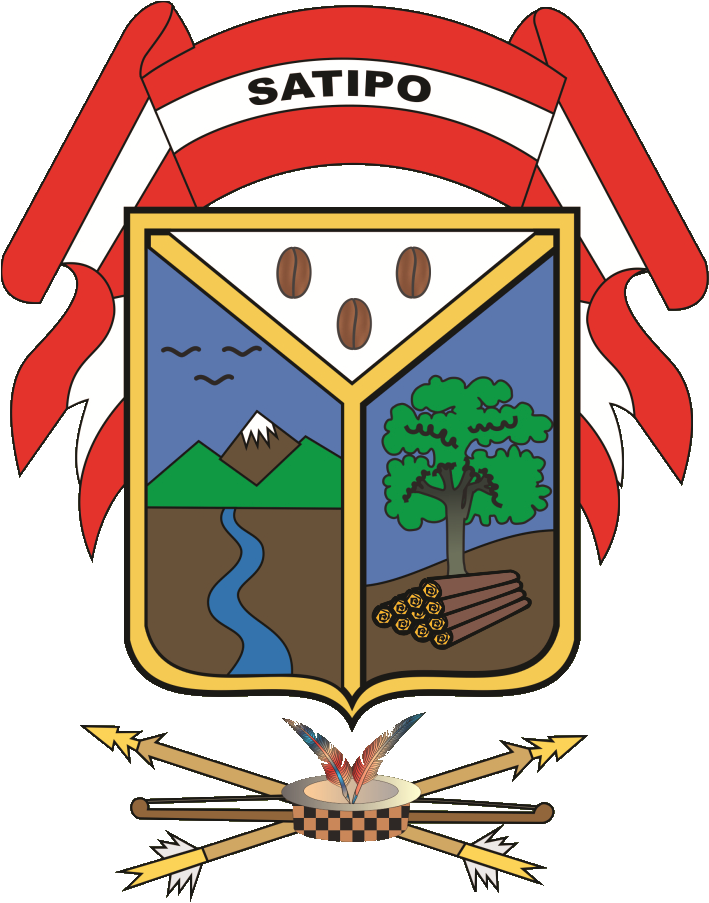
- Seal

- Location within Peru
- Coordinates: 11.25332°S 74.63702°W
- Country: Peru
- Region: Junín
- Province: Satipo
- District: Satipo

Government
  - Mayor: Cesar Augusto Merea Tello (2023-2026)
- Elevation: 628 m (2,060 ft)

Population (2017)
  - Total: 25,000
- Time zone: UTC-5 (PET)
- Website: www.munisatipo.gob.pe

Satipo is a town in central Peru, in Satipo District, Satipo Province in Junín Region. It is the capital of the Province of Satipo.

== Demographics ==
Satipo has an estimated 25,000 inhabitants as of 2017.

== History ==
It has an important ashaninka native population, present in the region since prehispanic times. In 1898, german Augusto Hilser arrived who is considered its first colonizer. In 1922, construction of the Concepción-Satipo road started. 1947, an earthquake devastated the town and killed 2,333 people.

== Climate ==
Climate data for Satipo, elevation 577 m (1,893 ft), (1991–2020)
Month	Jan	Feb	Mar	Apr	May	Jun	Jul	Aug	Sep	Oct	Nov	Dec	Year
Mean daily maximum °C (°F)	30.7 (87.3)	30.4 (86.7)	30.8 (87.4)	31.4 (88.5)	30.0 (86.0)	30.9 (87.6)	31.2 (88.2)	32.1 (89.8)	32.4 (90.3)	32.4 (90.3)	32.2 (90.0)	30.8 (87.4)	31.3 (88.3)
Mean daily minimum °C (°F)	19.8 (67.6)	19.7 (67.5)	19.6 (67.3)	19.4 (66.9)	18.8 (65.8)	17.7 (63.9)	16.7 (62.1)	16.8 (62.2)	17.6 (63.7)	18.8 (65.8)	19.5 (67.1)	19.6 (67.3)	18.7 (65.6)
Average precipitation mm (inches)	307.5 (12.11)	293.1 (11.54)	248.1 (9.77)	144.6 (5.69)	86.8 (3.42)	75.6 (2.98)	61.6 (2.43)	96.2 (3.79)	108.0 (4.25)	175.4 (6.91)	169.1 (6.66)	247.0 (9.72)	2,013 (79.27)
Source: National Meteorology and Hydrology Service of Peru
