= Muntirayuq =

Muntirayuq (Quechua: muntira an ancient cloth cap; a bullfighter's hat, -yuq a suffix, 'the one with a cap', also spelled Monterayoc, Monterrayoc) may refer to:

- Muntirayuq (Apurímac), a mountain in the Apurímac Region, Peru
- Muntirayuq (Junín), a mountain in the Apata District, Jauja Province, Junín Region, Peru
- Muntirayuq (Pomacancha), a mountain in the Pomacancha District, Jauja Province, Junín Region, Peru
