= Leonor Ordóñez =

Peruvian guerrilla fighter (1837–1882)

- Born: 1837; Huancaní, Peru
- Died: 22 April 1882 (aged 44–45)
- Conflicts: War of the Pacific: Lima campaign; Battle of San Juan and Chorrillos; Breña campaign; Battle of Huaripampa †
- Spouse: Felipe Vilcahuamán

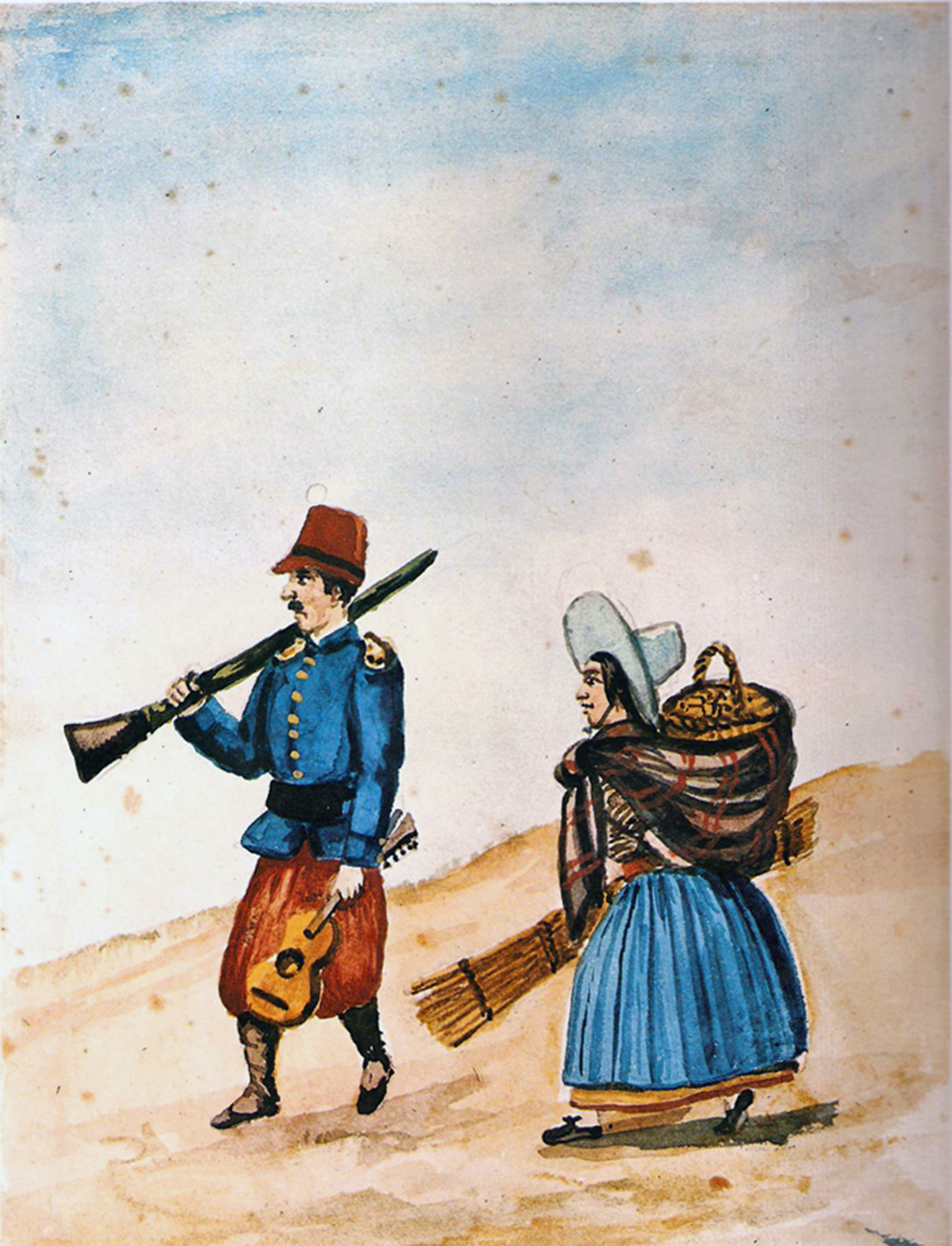
Soldier with his rabona, watercolor by Pancho Fierro, mid-19th century

Leonor Ordóñez Surichaqui de Vilcahuamán (1837 – 22 April 1882) was a Peruvian guerrilla fighter, partisan and heroine, who fought in the War of the Pacific, a territorial conflict between allied Bolivia and Peru against Chile (1879–1884).

== History ==
Ordóñez was born in 1837 in Huancaní, Peru. Her parents were José Ordóñez and Dolores Surichaqui.

During the Battle of San Juan and Chorrillos, in the defence of Lima, on 13 January 1881, Ordóñez served as rabona [es] (a term for women who accompanied infantry soldiers on military marches) for her husband Felipe Vilcahuamán. He died after being shot then hacked to death with a machete. She closed his eyes on the battlefield and dug his grave.

After her husband's death, Ordóñez travelled to the Mantaro Valley, where General Andrés Avelino Cáceres' resistance was in operation. She led a group of 41 guerrilla fighters (36 men and 5 women) to join the movement led by Father Buenaventura Mendoza and fought at the Battle of Huaripampa [es] on 22 April 1882. She was captured during the battle, but shouted to continue the fight, and was shot by Chilean troops.

Most of the details of Ordóñez's life are derived from the oral tradition.

== Legacy ==
In her memory, Ordóñez's home district in the Jauja province was renamed the Leonor Ordóñez District. A statue in her honour is located in the main square in the district.

In 1988, Ordóñez's remains were reinterred in the Cripta de los Héroes (Crypt of Heroes) in the Cementerio Presbítero Matías Maestro in Lima. Along with Antonia Moreno Leyva, Ordóñez is the only woman buried in the crypt.

In 2018, Ordóñez was portrayed in the short film Rabonas, las mujeres de la guerra [es], directed by Hamilton Segura.

In 2025, an event was held in Plaza Bolívar, Lima, by politician Ilich López in tribute to Ordóñez.
