= Muruqucha (disambiguation) =

Muruqucha is a mountain in the Lima Region, Peru.

Muruqucha (Quechua muru blunt; mutilated; stained; pip, grain; smallpox, qucha lake, also spelled Morococha) may also refer to:

- Morococha, a town in the Morococha District, Yauli Province, Junín Region, Peru
- Morococha District, a district in the Yauli Province, Junín Region, Peru
- Muruqucha (Jauja), a mountain in the Jauja Province, Junín Region, Peru
- Muruqucha (Marcapomacocha), a mountain at a small lake of that name in the Marcapomacocha District, Yauli Province, Junín Region, Peru
