= Lake Paca =

Lake in Peru

- Laguna de Paca
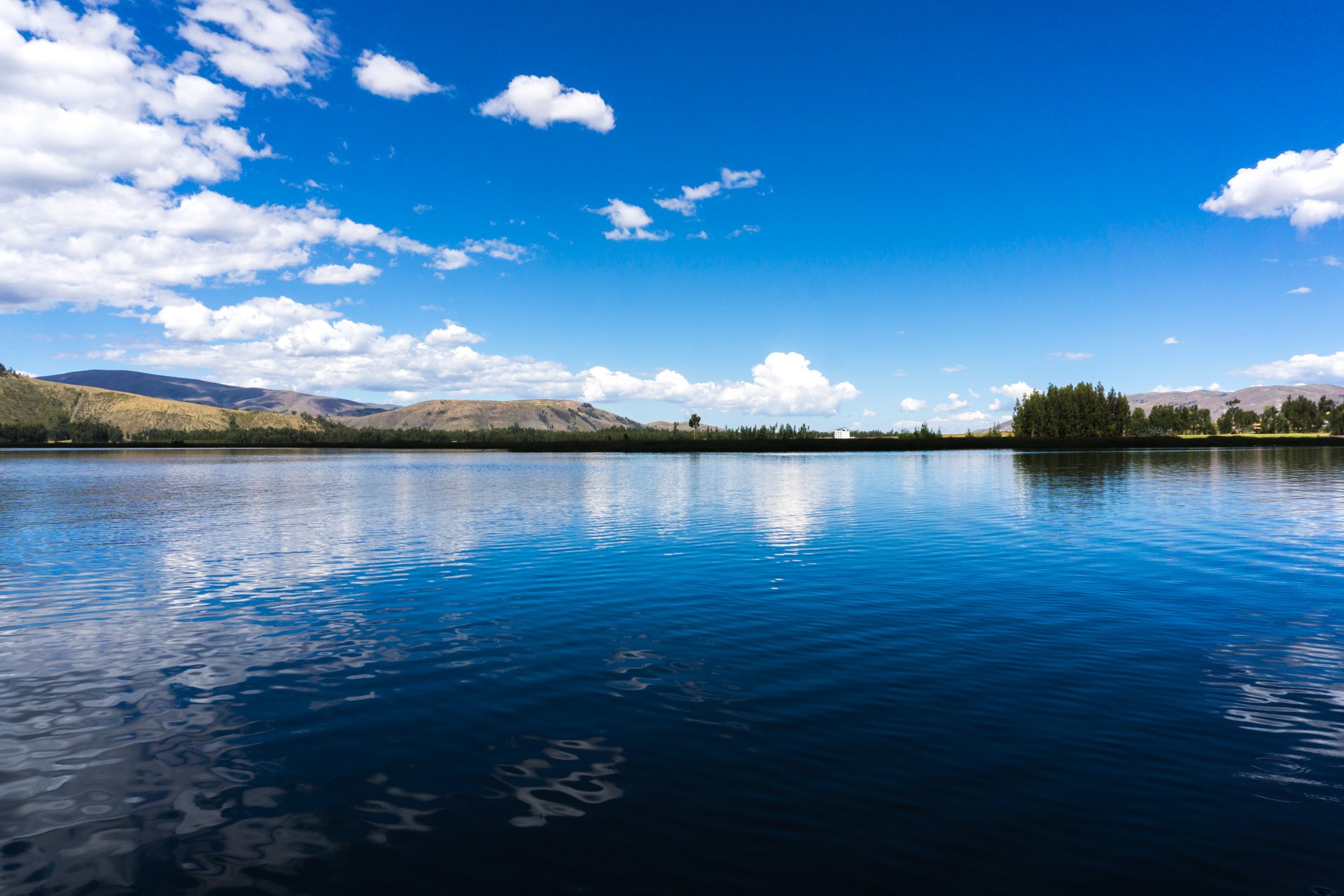

- Location within Peru
- Location: Junín Region
- Coordinates: 11°43′47″S 75°30′24″W
- Basin countries: Peru
- Surface elevation: 3,418 m (11,214 ft)

Lake Paca (Spanish: Laguna de Paca) is a lake in Peru. It is located 4 kilometres (2.5 mi) north of the historic town of Jauja, which was once the first capital of Peru. The lake is habitat for a variety of flora and fauna. The lake is fed from springs.

== Geography ==
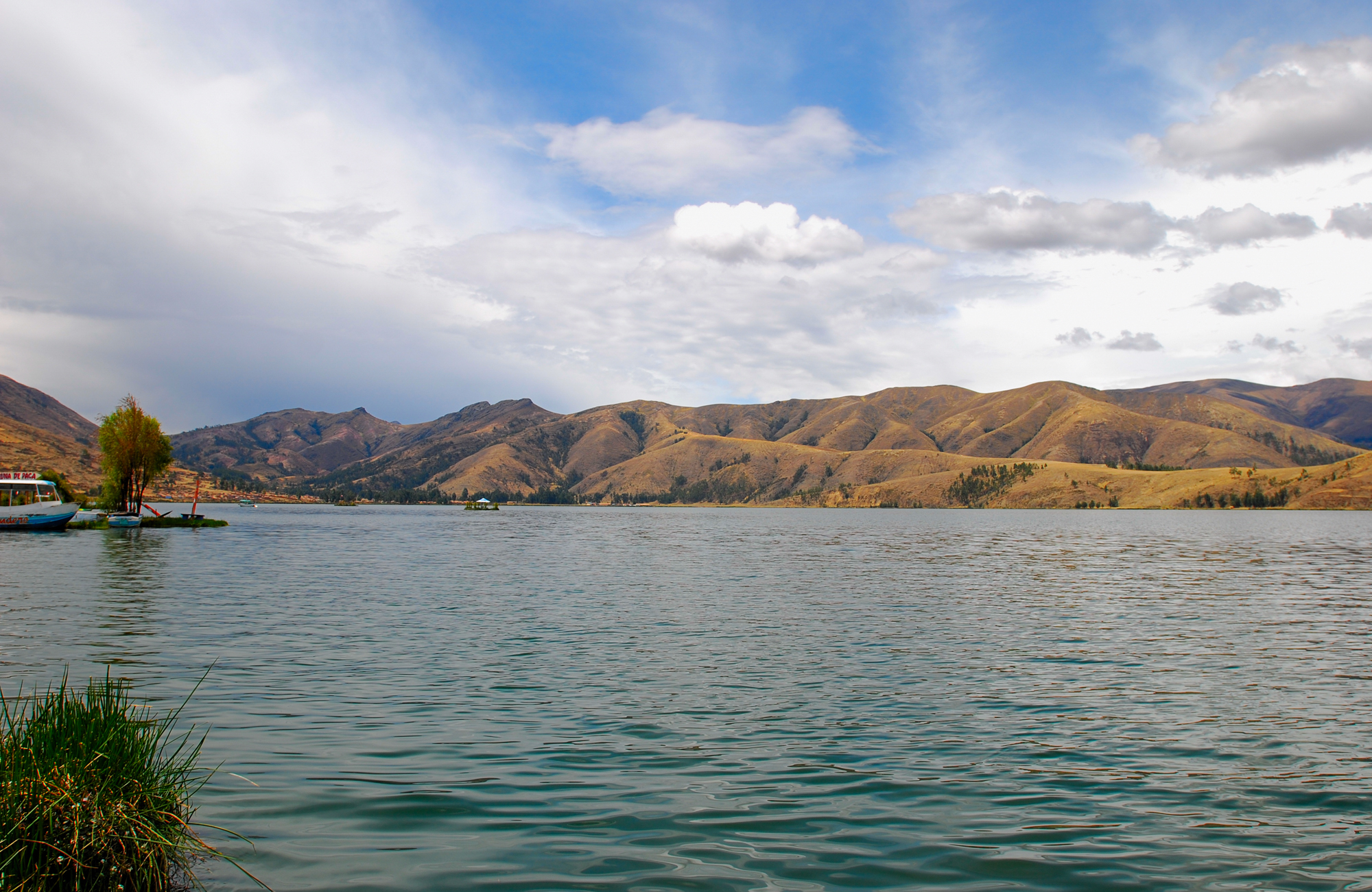
Laguna de Paca in Jauja, Junin, Peru

Lake Paca is one of the three lakes in the Mantaro River Valley in the central highlands of Peru formed by high Cordillera ranges, which has three tributary valleys known as the Masma, the Paca and the Yanamarca. Laguna Paca is the only lake in the Paca valley which has water throughout the year. However, floating mats of rushes and sedges cover the south side of the lake. The lake itself does not drain out, as like the other lakes in the valleys, has been “filled up by interglacial fill, and alluvial and eolian sedimentation.” The river that originates in this valley, is called the Mantaro River. It flows near the Jauja town into a large alluvial plain. Formation of this region and its lake system is attributed to diverse sedimentary, glacial and tectonic activity. The valley formation is dated to the Late Pliocene and early Pleistocene uplift unconformity.

The lake is located at an elevation of 3,418 metres (11,214 ft) within the districts of Paca, Chunán and Pancán. The lake has a storage capacity of 85,500 cubic metres (3,020,000 ft^{3}). It is a popular tourist attraction visited by people from the Mantaro Valley and other regions of Peru.

The lake harbors a variety of wildlife, birds in particular. The introduced trout is found the lake, which is fished and served fried in restaurants located around the lake

== Historic culture ==
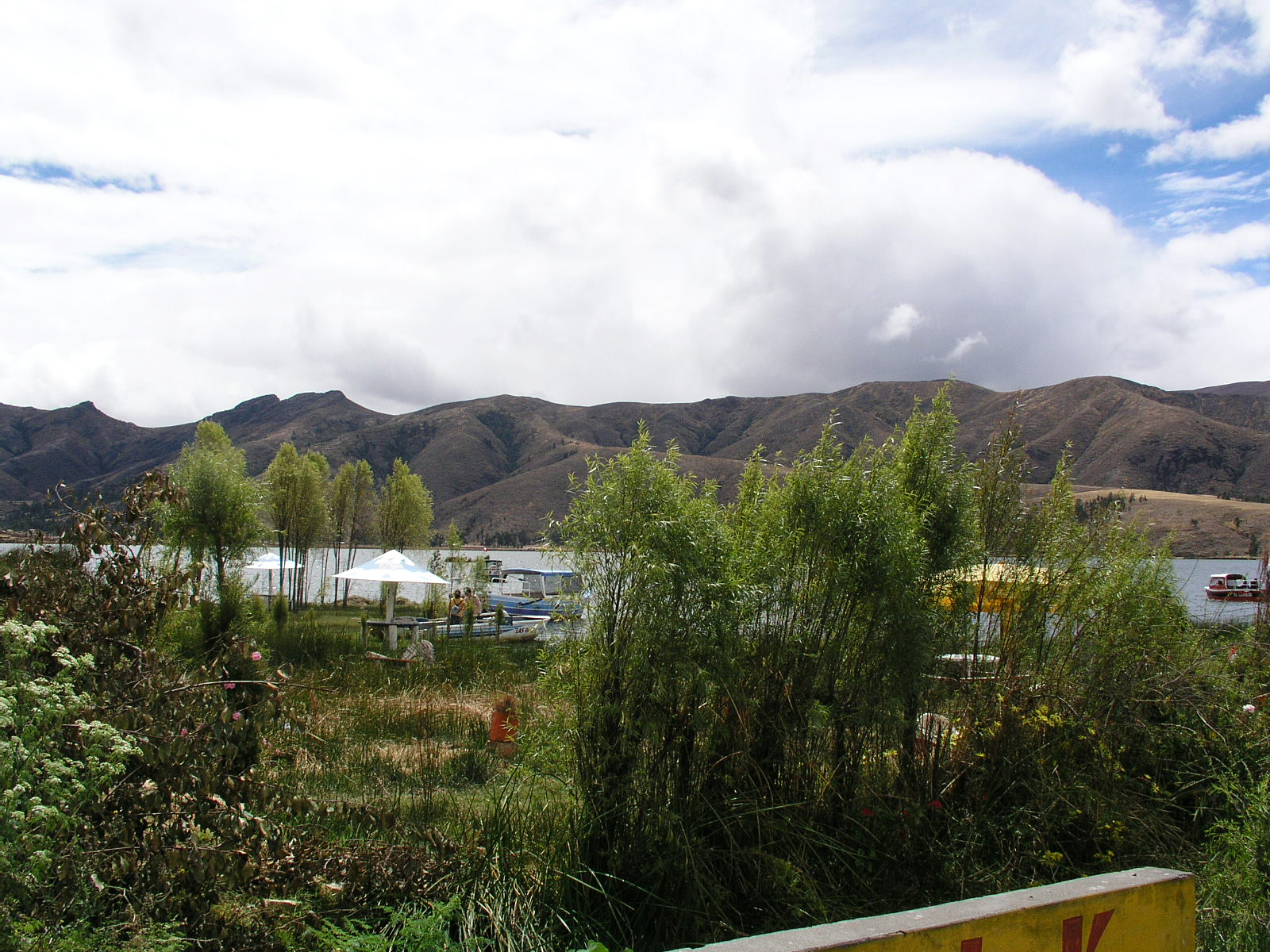
A resort on the bank of Laguna de Paca

The historic culture of the region represented as Huanca culture is seen in the precincts of the lake also, in the form of stone circular buildings, which are mostly in ruins. The west side of the lake has many popular restaurants catering to tourist traffic.

According to legend cited by Dennis Siluk, in addition to the city which was buried near Chupaea in the lake Ñawinpuyku, Laguna de Paca lake area was also a city where the Wanka culture, also known as the Huanca culture, flourished. It is conjectured that this culture existed even at the time of the birth of Christ. The legend of the lake has been further glorified by Dennis Siluk, the Poet Laureate of Peru, with the following verses of a poem.

Part one
I shall tell you a legend of long ago
Of the sunken city of La Laguna de Paca,
(Where I had met a lingering ghost)
Wherein this region of Huancayo-Peru;
Truth lies, but only the soul knows.

Part two
“The legend goes, of long ago:
During the raising of the full moon
The mermaid of the La Laguna de Paca, appears
And to the nearby town’s folks, she echoes…
Echoes, her cries and moans

Then when one thinks all is well—
The enchanting rings, the rings…!
Of the bells, the Great Bells, bells
Of the sunken church of La Laguna de Paca
Are heard, heard by the folks of the town.

Part Three
But there is more to this legend:
For it is said, wherein the dark night
(The ink dark macabre star-lit nights)
Wherein the eeriness of the full moon
Ebbs across the Laguna de Paca, gives birth,
To the Great Bull, who scorches the hillside!
Scorches the foliage to its bones…!
Scorches with fire and brimstone.

Part Four
And now I tell you of my tale—
A tale that took place but a few days ago,
By a misty embankment along the Laguna de Paca.
Here, here I stood, stood within its grip, trance:
Aloft in the eldritch dark—it lingered
This shadowy configuration of the ghoul,
The ghoul l…l… of the lake, Laguna de Paca--.

And there in the giant eucalyptus, Grande Tree
It shifted and swayed, peering: looking at me…
Then at forth glance, it disappeared,
As if it sank—submerged! …into the great lake…
Of La Laguna de Paca!...

== See also ==
- List of lakes in Peru
