= Hugo Orellana Bonilla =

Peruvian painter

- Born: 1932; Ataura, Jauja, Peru
- Died: January 28, 2007 (aged 74–75); Jauja, Peru
- Education: National School of Fine Arts (Peru), studies in Paris, Florence, and Mexico City
- Known for: Painting, writing, sculpture, ethnomusicology
- Notable work: Retrospective at Alianza Francesa (1987), collection of Andean ethnomusicology
- Movement: Andean cultural revival, Latin American modernism
- Awards: Doctor Honoris Causa, Los Andes Peruvian University

Hugo Orellana Bonilla (Jauja, 1932 - January 28, 2007) was one of the most recognized Peruvian painters. He was born in 1932 Ataura a district of Jauja, Peru. He studied at the Lima Academy of Fine Arts, Paris, Florence and Mexico City between 1953 and 1961.

== Major influences ==
In 1987 his critically acclaimed retrospective was presented at the Alianza Francesa in Lima, Peru. A mentor to many young artists from Latin America, he took a special interest in studying Andean philosophy and traditions. His collection of ethnomusicology is housed at the Pontifical Catholic University of Peru.

A prolific artist he continued to explore new styles in Huayta Huasi his museum-house in the remote town of Ataura in Jauja. He was part of a new generation of artists who also shared with painters, musicians and eminent researchers. While in Europe he befriended Mario Vargas Llosa, Guillermo Lobatón and Julio Ramón Ribeyro among others.

Orellana Bonilla found a group of Arts and Letters along with poets from Jauja Martín Fierro, Dimas Fernández, Gerardo García Rosales and Sergio Castillo Falconí.

He has served as consultant to academics and university students. His writings were published in different languages and were presented in much of the world. He left a great legacy of unpublished paintings and writings, voice and video recordings and sculptures to his successors.

In France he was the leading voice of Andean group, los Calachakis.

== Honors ==
- He received Doctor Honoris Causa from Los Andes Peruvian University.
