= Antikuna (Jauja) =

Mountain in Peru

- Location within Peru

Highest point
- Elevation: 4,800 m (15,700 ft)
- Coordinates: 11°43′15″S 75°12′54″W

Geography
- Location: Peru, Junín Region
- Parent range: Andes

Antikuna (Quechua for metals or minerals or the inhabitants of the rainforest, also spelled Anticona) is a mountain in the Andes of Peru which reaches a height of approximately 4,800 metres (15,748 ft). It is located in the Junín Region, Jauja Province, Apata District. Antikuna lies south of Utkhulasu and T'uruqucha.
