= Muqui =

Muqui may refer to

- Muki (Lima), also spelled Muqui, a mountain in the Lima Region, Peru
- Muki (mythology), also spelled Mooqui or Muqui, a mythological figure in the Andes
- Muqui District, a district in Peru
- Muqui, Espírito Santo, a municipality in the state of Espírito Santo
- Muqui River, a river in the state of rondônia, Brazil
