= 2022 Peruvian economic protests =

2022 protests in Peru

- Part of 2016–present Peruvian political crisis
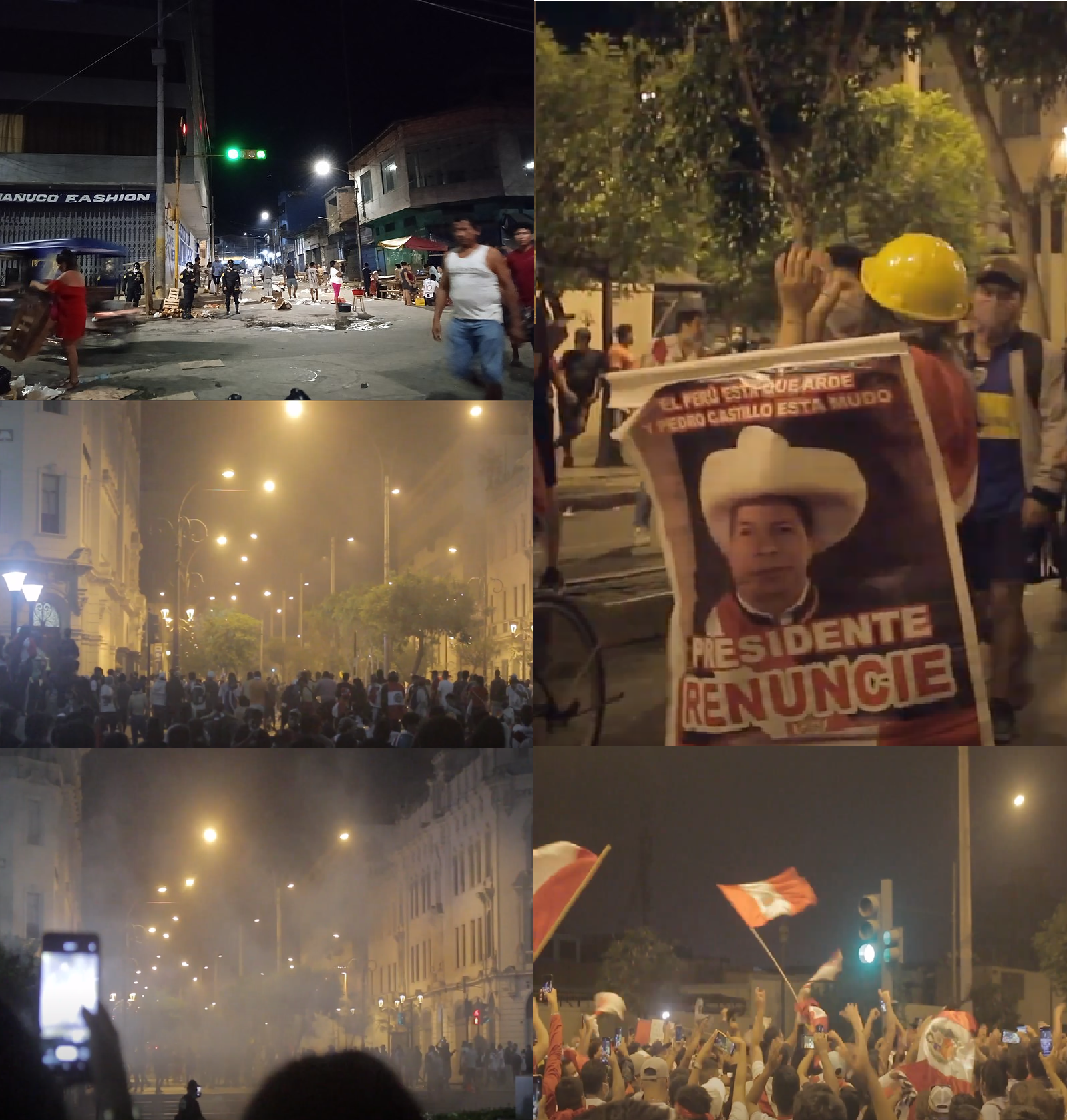
- Top to Bottom: Looting, A person with a sign, a blockade, person with a cellphone, and people waving Peruvian flags.
- Date: 28 March 2022 – 18 April 2022
- Location: Peru
- Caused by: Economic decline due to COVID-19 pandemic in Peru; The failed impeachment attempt of Pedro Castillo; Price hike of basic commodities
- Goals: Fuel price controls; Removal of President Castillo
- Methods: Blockades; Labor strike; Riots

Parties
Union of Multimodal Transport Guilds of Peru (UGTRANM) Anti-Castillo protestors	Government of Peru: National Police; Pro-Castillo protestors

Lead figures
Geovani Rafael Diez Villegas	Pedro Castillo; Dina Boluarte; Aníbal Torres

Casualties
- Deaths: 8

Mass protests in Peru against inflation and President Pedro Castillo's government began in March 2022. The protests occurred amid rising fertilizer and fuel prices caused by Russia's invasion of Ukraine and international sanctions imposed on Russia. Some of the larger protests were organized by Geovani Rafael Diez Villegas, the leader of the Union of Multimodal Transport Guilds of Peru (UGTRANM) who had previously collaborated in late 2021 with business executives and right-wing politicians, opposing the Castillo government and whose power is recognized as rivaling the government's own Ministry of Transport and Communications. Diez Villegas demanded the removal of passenger restrictions on buses, pardons for transportation workers who were charged with crimes, and negotiations for forgiving debt owed by transportation businessmen to the government. He later organized a general strike aimed at paralysing transportation in Peru beginning on 4 April 2022 that resulted in protests, product shortages, transportation stoppages and rioting.

The Castillo government responded to initial protests by suspending a 30% fuel tax, though fuel companies refused to lower their prices and protests continued. Following widespread rioting on 4 April after the UGTRANM called for a general strike, President Castillo declared a one-month state of emergency, citing intelligence reports of planned violence, and enforced a curfew in the capital city of Lima that was later withdrawn. Rioting occurred nationwide on 5 April, with thousands demonstrating in Lima and attempting to storm the Legislative Palace during Castillo's meeting with Congress. Additionally, the offices of the Supreme Court were looted. On 7 April, Castillo met with various protest leaders to find a solution to the situation, while later that day Congress voted on a motion calling for Castillo's resignation, with 61 approving, 43 against and 1 abstaining.

== Background ==
=== COVID-19 pandemic in Peru ===
As a result of economic stagnation during the COVID-19 pandemic in Peru, between ten and twenty percent of Peruvians fell below the poverty line in 2020, reversing a decade of poverty reduction in the country and resulting in a poverty rate of 30.1% that year. According to the Institute of Economics and Business Development (IEDEP) of the Lima Chamber of Commerce, the country's middle class shrank by almost half from 43.6% in 2019 to 24% in 2020 due to the crisis. Following the global economic reverberations resulting from sanctions against Russia due to the Russian invasion of Ukraine beginning in February 2022, inflation in Peru rose sharply. By April 2022, the inflation rate in Peru rose to its highest level in 26 years, creating greater difficulties for the recently impoverished population.

=== Brotherhood of Pisco ===
According to Convoca, the leader of the Union of Multimodal Transport Guilds of Peru (UGTRANM), Geovani Rafael Diez Villegas, met with President Castillo in August 2021 on behalf of the National Society of Industries (SNI), a manufacturing employers' organization. Due to the power that Diez Villegas holds within Peru, he was described by El Comercio as a "parallel minister" of the Ministry of Transport and Communications (MTC), with the newspaper writing that "[h]e has the decision-making power over the regulations published by the MTC and has walked through that ministry for three administrations as if it were his home". In September 2021, leaders of the SNI, UGTRANM, political leaders and other business executives began to meet as the "Brotherhood of Pisco" and planned various actions, including funding transportation strikes in order to destabilize the Castillo government and prompt his removal. In October 2021, the website El Foco released recordings revealing a leaked WhatsApp group chat, with Bruno Alecchi of the Permanent Transport Committee of the SNI forwarding messages from UGTRANM leader Geovani Rafael Diez Villegas about a transportation strike organized for 8 November 2021 and shared ideas of support, with the president of the SNI and former Vice President of Peru under Alberto Fujimori, Ricardo Márquez Flores, being mentioned in the chat. Planners were also discussing proposals to pay for protests and the purchase of media to support their effort to remove Castillo from office. El Foco reported that they discovered a Fujimorist named Vanya Thais who created the "Freedom Project" media operation had also been in contact with the group after they planned to fund her project. After the messages were leaked, further leaks showed that members of the group chat warned to leave the group because of media monitoring. The SNI later released a statement that the personal opinions of individuals in their organization did not represent the entity as a whole.

=== Impeachment motions ===
Through his tenure, Castillo has chosen controversial individuals to serve in his government and cabinet, with some officials being described by critics as unqualified for their positions – mainly from the Free Peru party he belonged to – while others were allegedly involved in corruption.

Four months into Castillo's term, his former presidential challenger Keiko Fujimori announced on 19 November 2021 that her party was pushing forward impeachment proceedings arguing that Castillo was "morally unfit for office". A short time later, controversy arose when newspapers reported that Castillo had met with individuals at his former campaign headquarters in Breña without public record, a potential violation of a recently created and a complicated set of transparency regulations. Audios purportedly obtained at the residence and released by América Televisión were criticized and dismissed as fraudulent. Castillo responded to the impeachment threat, stating "I am not worried about the political noise because the people have chosen me, not the mafias or the corrupt". The impeachment did not occur: 76 members of Congress voted against proceedings, 46 were in favor and 4 abstained. Hence, the requirement of 52 favourable votes was not met. Free Peru ultimately supported Castillo through the process and described the vote as an attempted right-wing coup. Castillo responded to the vote stating "Brothers and sisters, let's end political crises and work together to achieve a just and supportive Peru".

In February 2022, it was reported that Fujimorists and politicians close to Keiko Fujimori organized a meeting at the Casa Andina hotel in Lima with the assistance of the German liberal group Friedrich Naumann Foundation, with those present including President of the Congress Maricarmen Alva discussing plans to remove President Castillo from office. Congress president Maricarmen Alva had already shared her readiness to assume the presidency of Peru if Castillo were to be vacated from the position and a leaked Telegram group chat of the Board of Directors of Congress that she heads revealed plans coordinated to oust Castillo. A second impeachment attempt related to corruption allegations did make it to proceedings in March 2022 as Castillo saw his approval rating drop to 24%. On 28 March 2022, Castillo appeared before Congress calling the allegations baseless and called for legislators to "vote for democracy" and "against instability", with 55 voting for impeachment, 54 voting against and 19 abstaining, not reaching the 87 votes necessary for impeaching Castillo. At the same time, UGTRANM leader Geovani Rafael Diez Villegas – who was previously reported to be involved with the Brotherhood of Pisco to remove Castillo from office – announced the beginning of transportation strikes in Peru.

== Timeline ==
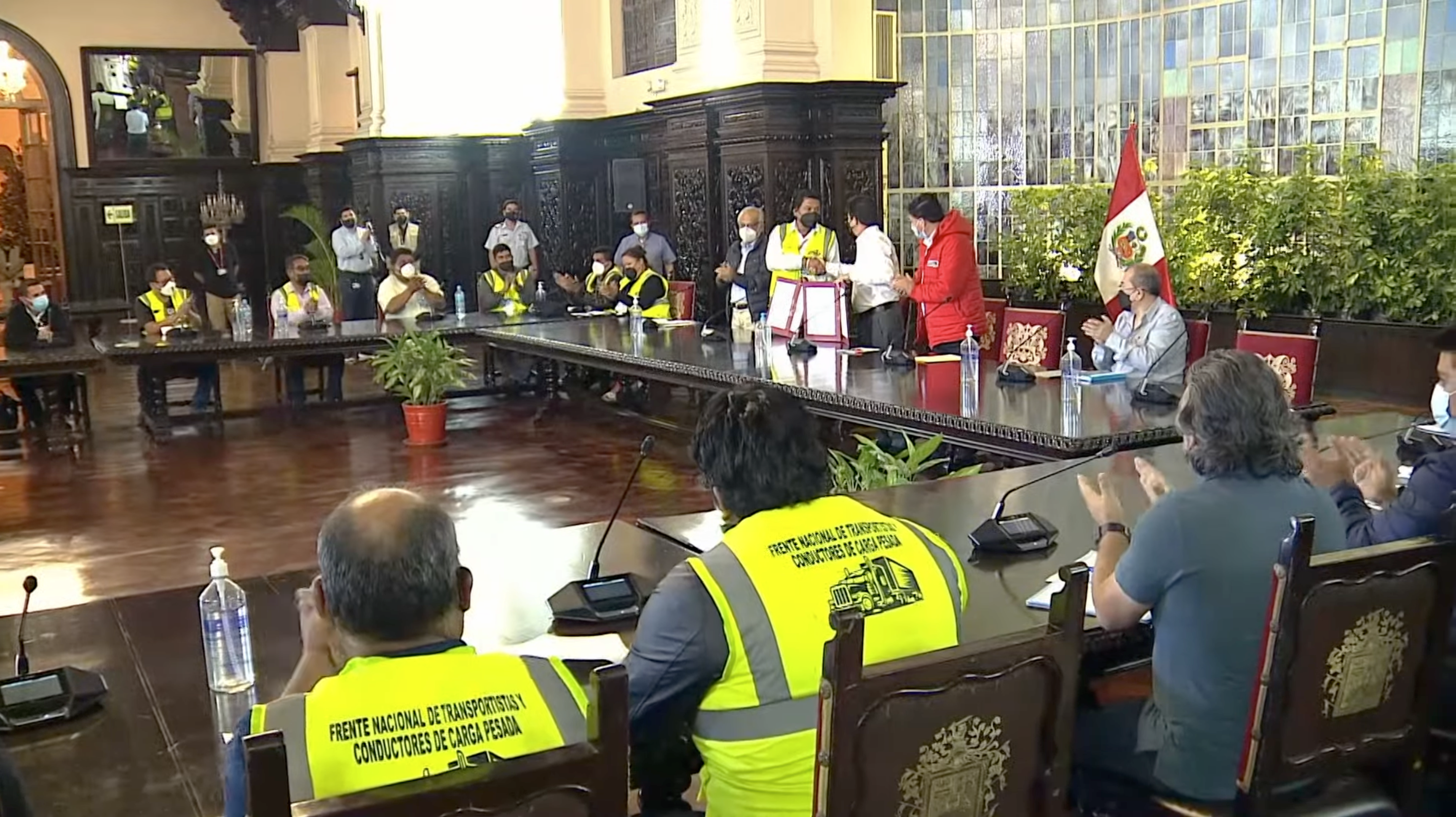
President Pedro Castillo after signing an agreement with the National Front of Carriers and Heavy Cargo Drivers on 3 April 2022.

Inflation of basic goods alongside increasing fertilizer and fuel prices as a result of international sanctions on Russia angered rural Peruvians, shifting them from their position of supporting Castillo to protesting his government. Since Peru relies on imported oil products more than other nations in the region, the sanctions and subsequent price increases had a larger impact. The first blockades began on 28 March 2022, the day of the failed impeachment of President Castillo. UGTRANM outlined demands that included the removal of passenger restrictions in buses, pardons for transportation workers who were charged with crimes and negotiations for transportation businessmen who owed thousands of soles to the government. UGTRANM leader Geovani Rafael Diez Villegas himself owed the Superintendencia Nacional de Administración Tributaria (SUNAT) thousands of soles. Castillo stated on 31 March that protests were organized by "paid leaders" and "malintentioned", though he would later apologize while maintaining that some demonstrations "may have infiltrated".

On 1 April 2022, protesters in Junín began to riot, looting stores, ATMs and pharmacies, with authorities announcing that 10 were arrested during the riots. Simultaneously, representatives of the Castillo government travelled through the nation to negotiate with UGTRANM and transportation representatives, though they were turned away. UGTRANM leaders demanded that the Castillo administration lower fuel prices, though the government had already instituted the Fuel Price Stabilization Fund according to economist Jorge Gonzales Izquierdo in order to prevent diesel fuel price hikes. The government removed a fuel tax that added about 30% to prices, though fuel stations refused to lower their prices. UGTRANM's Diez Villegas on 2 April announced a national general strike to occur on 4 April.

Strong rioting in Huancayo on 3 April resulted with the deaths of four people; two died from traffic accidents, one teacher died after being prevented from receiving hemodialysis treatment and one minor drowned when fleeing street clashes. President Castillo responded to the crisis by announcing on 3 April a 10% increase for the national minimum wage and further lowering fuel taxes. The move, however, had little effect on transportation workers who often labor in Peru's large informal economy of nearly 70%. Castillo also proposed removing the general sales tax, though this had to be approved by Congress.

The national general strike organized by Diez Villegas began on 4 April 2022, with bus drivers blocking roads throughout the nation to prevent transportation despite agreements made with the Castillo government on 3 April. Transportation stoppages were reported in the departments of Amazonas, Ica, Lima, Piura, San Martín and Ucayali. In the Department of Ica, the looting of stores was reported while protesters burned toll booths on the Pan-American Highway. In Lima, one individual died in an ambulance blocked by protesters while protesters in San Juan de Lurigancho clashed with police and transport workers who did not comply with the general strike. The National Police responded to the closure of the Central Highway in the Pachacámac District, firing tear gas at 250 protesters who clashed with police. The Castillo government responded to the violence by deploying the Armed Forces, with 95 patrols of the Peruvian Army being deployed to heavily affected regions. During a late night announcement, President Castillo declared a state of emergency and enforced a total curfew in Lima for the entire day of 5 April.

Some Peruvians awoke surprised on 5 April, not knowing that a full-day curfew had been announced by Castillo, causing transportation conflicts for those in the capital. At noon, various cacerolazos were heard in various districts of Lima. Into the evening, thousands of protesters defiantly formed marches that congregated at Plaza San Martín and attempted to approach the Legislative Palace, where President Castillo was meeting with Congress. Congresswoman Norma Yarrow of the far-right Popular Renewal party demanded that officers allow protesters to gather outside of the Legislative Palace. Protesters later stormed the offices of the Supreme Court of Peru and looted items, including computers, appliances and office supplies, with the National Police dispersing the crowds with tear gas after they attempted to set the facility on fire. In Ambo, intense clashes between protesters and police resulted with one person killed due to head injuries.

Intense protests continued on 6 April, with clashes occurring throughout the department of Ica and reports of one dead and eleven injured while protesting on the Pan-American Highway near the Salas District in the morning. Two others were killed in the San Juan Bautista District. During the fierce rioting in Ica, reporters and police were attacked by protesters while two police officers were kidnapped. UGTRANM leader Diez Villegas stated that in the two previous days of protests, "no public transport, tourist, taxi and even motorcycle taxi services would provide their transfer services to Peruvians" and that 140,000 transportation workers participated in the strike to paralyze Lima. Diez Villegas said that such measures were taken against Castillo after the president raised allegations that those organizing protests had bad intentions. In Lima, supporters of Castillo gathered in Plaza San Martín to protest against Congress.

President Castillo travelled to Huancayo on 7 April to attend the Decentralized Council of Ministers at the Wanka Coliseum, with 3,000 police officers deployed to secure the area. At the meeting, Castillo stated "In Peru, freedom of protest and demonstration must be a fact and a leader must never be persecuted." Representatives of the agricultural and transportation groups present discussed concerns with Castillo while also recognizing the obstruction Congress performed against the president, with one leader and former mayor of the Acolla District, Jaime Esteban Aquino, stating "If they don't understand, the people will also fight against those congressmen. ... The Executive has already heard our demands, ... If the president and the ministers resign, everyone will leave". Prime Minister Aníbal Torres shared at the meeting an inaccurate claim about infrastructure improvement that Peru could experience, saying that Germany was similar to Peru until Adolf Hitler improved its productivity through the construction of the Autobahn, with Torres sharing what Radio Programas del Perú reported as a remnant of Nazi propaganda. Protests in support and against Castillo occurred outside the Wanka Coliseum during the event. In Lima, members of CGTP and SUTEP marched to the Legislative Palace in support of Castillo to demand that Congress stop obstruction, to organize a Constituent Assembly to draft a new constitution for Peru and that if such changes were not made, that Congress be dissolved. At the end of the day, Congress voted on a motion to call for the resignation of Castillo, with 61 approving a call for his resignation, 43 voting against and 1 abstaining.

On 9 April, President Castillo presented a constitutional amendment proposal to reform Article 61 of the Peruvian constitution, sharing plans on what he said would ban "monopolies, oligopolies, hoarding, speculation or price agreements, as well as the abuse of dominant positions in the market" in order to establish a social market economy.

Despite a truce between the government and some groups, unions in Cusco began protests on 18 April demanding the lowering of prices and the rewriting of the Peruvian constitution, resulting with hundreds of tourists being stranded in some areas.

On 5 November 2022, thousands of opponents of the government marched through the capital's center to call for the removal of President Pedro Castillo.

== Reactions ==
=== Domestic ===
According to general manager of the National Transport Council (CNT), Martín Ojeda, the actions of transportation workers blocking roads were illegal and similar to extortion, with Ojeda stating "What the Government has to apply, with the Public Prosecutor's Office and the Ministry of the Interior, is Article 200 of the Criminal Code". Ojeda explained that transportation groups did have the right to strike by not driving, but that blocking routes throughout the country was a criminal act.

Opposition politicians and human rights groups criticized the curfew imposed by the Castillo government on 5 April. Verónika Mendoza, leader of the left-wing Together for Peru party, criticized the curfew, stating "The Government has not only betrayed the promises of change for which the people chose him, but now repeats the right-wing method of 'conflict resolution': ignoring those who mobilize expressing their legitimate discomfort with the economic and political situation, repressing, criminalizing and restricting rights". Former president Martín Vizcarra called on Castillo to resign from office. The Castillo government said that the curfew was justified due to intelligence reports of planned violence.

On the other hand, Vladimir Cerrón, a government ally in the hardliner faction of Perú Libre, responded to Mendoza: "You betrayed [them] when you joined the Government of Perú Libre, with your personal and group ambitions, with your taking over of the cabinet, preventing the Party's program from being implemented, brainwashing the president, fulfilling his role as an agent of the right." Former president Manuel Merino, who briefly held the presidency after Vizcarra was vacated, questioned politicians such as Francisco Sagasti, Mirtha Vásquez, Julio Guzmán, Alberto de Belaunde, Gino Costa, Verónika Mendoza and Sigrid Bazán remaining silent in the face of the deceased, unlike with the deaths of Brian Pintado and Inti Sotelo in their short 2020 administration.

=== International ===
The Community of Latin American and Caribbean States (CELAC) released a statement in which it expressed "concern and regret" over the protests and deaths, and urged respect for the "democratic order".

The Inter-American Commission on Human Rights (CIDH) condemned the "restriction to fundamental rights and events of violence" in Peru. The statement further stated that the state of emergency imposed by the government was "inadequate and dangerous" and reiterated that social protests "are an essential right for the existence and consolidation of democratic societies".

President of Bolivia Luis Arce said that the right-wing in Peru "want to rip off in the streets what they did not win at the polls" and "we have to respect the popular vote of the Peruvian people".

== See also ==
- 2020 Peruvian protests
- 2022 Ecuadorian protests
- 2022 Sri Lankan protests
- Canada convoy protest
- Economic impact of the 2022 Russian invasion of Ukraine
- 2021–2022 global energy crisis
- List of protests in the 21st century
