= Apata District =

Coordinates: 11.8440°S 75.3791°W

Apata
- District
- Interactive map of Apata
- Country: Peru
- Region: Junín
- Province: Jauja
- Founded: January 2, 1857
- Capital: Apata

Government
  - Mayor: José Vidal Rojas Paitan

Area
  - Total: 421.62 km^{2} (162.79 sq mi)
- Elevation: 3,340 m (10,960 ft)

Population (2005 census)
  - Total: 5,163
  - Density: 12.25/km^{2} (31.72/sq mi)
- Time zone: UTC-5 (PET)
- UBIGEO: 120403

Apata District is one of thirty-four districts of the Jauja Province, located at an elevation of 3.340 min the Department of Junin in Peru. It encompasses an area of 421.62 km^{2}. It was elevated to district level in November 16, 1864, during the presidency of José Balta.

== Geography ==
Some of the highest mountains of the district are listed below:

- Antikuna
- Chawpiqucha
- Marayrasu
- Marayrasu (Apata)
- Muntirayuq
- Muruqucha
- Pichana
- Pumaqucha
- Puywan
- Suyruqucha
- Tuku Mach'ay
- Tunki
- T'uruqucha
- Uqsha Mach'ay
- Utkhulasu
- Waqraqucha
- Wayta Pallana
- Yana Uqsha
- Yanaqa

== See also ==
- Pumaqucha
- Tipiqucha
