= Suyruqucha (Junín) =

Mountain in Peru

- Location within Peru

Highest point
- Elevation: 4,800 m (15,700 ft)
- Coordinates: 11°42′34″S 75°14′18″W

Geography
- Location: Peru, Junín Region
- Parent range: Andes

Suyruqucha (Quechua suyru a very long dress tracked after when worn, qucha lake, also spelled Suirococha) is a mountain in the Andes of Peru which reaches a height of approximately 4,800 metres (15,748 ft). It is located in the Junín Region, Jauja Province, Apata District. It lies south of Marayrasu.
