= Tipiqucha =

Tipiqucha (Quechua, Hispanicized Tipiccocha, Tipicocha, Tipicucha) may refer to:

- Tipiqucha (Apurímac), a lake in the Apurímac Region, Peru
- Tipiqucha (Ayacucho), a lake in the Ayacucho Region, Peru
- Tipiqucha (Huancavelica), a lake in the Huancavelica Region, Peru
- Tipiqucha (Junín), a lake at a small place of that name in the Junín Region, Peru
