= Waqlamarka =

Archaeological site in Peru

- Location: Peru, Junín Region, Jauja Province, Parco District

Waqlamarka (local Quechua waqla (waqra) horn, marka settlement / storey, "horn village", hispanicized spelling Hacjlasmarca) is an archaeological site with walls and round burial towers (chullpa) in Peru. It is situated in the Junín Region, Jauja Province, Parco District.

== See also ==
- Hatunmarka
- Tunanmarka
