= Hatunmarka =

Archaeological site in Peru

- Interactive map of Hatunmarka
- Location: Peru, Junín Region, Jauja Province, Marco District

Hatunmarka (Quechua hatun big, marka settlement / storey, "big settlement", hispanicized spelling Hatunmarca, Jatun Malca) is an archaeological site in Peru. It is located in the Junín Region, Jauja Province, Marco District. The site was declared a National Cultural Heritage by Resolución Directoral Nacional No. 1346 in November 2000.

== See also ==
- Tunanmarca
- Waqlamarka
