= Lake Pumacocha =

Lake Pumacocha may refer to:

- Lake Pumacocha (Jauja), a lake in the Jauja Province, Junín Region, Peru
- Lake Pumacocha (Lima), a lake in the Lima Region, Peru
- Lake Pumacocha (Yauli), a lake in the Yauli Province, Junín Region, Peru
