= Yauli =

Yauli may refer to:

- Yauli Province
- Yauli District, Huancavelica
- Yauli District, Jauja
- Yauli District, Yauli
