= Antikuna =

Antikuna or Anticona may refer to:

- Ticlio, a mountain in the Lima Region and the Junín Region of Peru
- Antikuna (Jauja), a mountain in the Junín Region of Peru
- Antikuna (god), a sacred Apu in South American mythology
- Antikuna (spider), a genus of tarantulas
