= Yauyos District, Jauja =

Yauyos Yawyu
- District
- Coat of arms
- Interactive map of Yauyos
- Coordinates: 12°27′50″S 75°55′24″W
- Country: Peru
- Region: Junín
- Province: Jauja
- Founded: January 29, 1965
- Capital: Yauyos

Government
  - Mayor: Ricardo Paulino Gonzales Urco

Area
  - Total: 20.54 km^{2} (7.93 sq mi)
- Elevation: 3,410 m (11,190 ft)

Population (2005 census)
  - Total: 9,570
  - Density: 466/km^{2} (1,210/sq mi)
- Time zone: UTC-5 (PET)
- UBIGEO: 120434
- Website: muniyauyos.gob.pe

Yauyos District is one of thirty-four districts of the province Jauja in Peru.
