= Sincos District =

Coordinates: 11.8911°S 75.3920°W

Sincos
- District
- Interactive map of Sincos
- Country: Peru
- Region: Junín
- Province: Jauja
- Founded: January 2, 1857
- Capital: Sincos

Government
  - Mayor: Eufracio Hilario Lazaro Tacza

Area
  - Total: 236.74 km^{2} (91.41 sq mi)
- Elevation: 3,300 m (10,800 ft)

Population (2005 census)
  - Total: 4,579
  - Density: 19.34/km^{2} (50.10/sq mi)
- Time zone: UTC-5 (PET)
- UBIGEO: 120431

Sincos District is one of thirty-four districts of the province Jauja in Peru.
