= Ricran District =

Coordinates: 11.8468°S 75.3874°W

Ricran
- District
- Interactive map of Ricran
- Country: Peru
- Region: Junín
- Province: Jauja
- Founded: January 20, 1944
- Capital: Ricran

Government
  - Mayor: Lorenzo Fortunato Simeon Nuñez

Area
  - Total: 319.95 km^{2} (123.53 sq mi)
- Elevation: 3,675 m (12,057 ft)

Population (2005 census)
  - Total: 2,297
  - Density: 7.179/km^{2} (18.59/sq mi)
- Time zone: UTC-5 (PET)
- UBIGEO: 120427

Ricran District is one of thirty-four districts of the Jauja Province in Peru.

== Geography ==
One of the highest peaks of the district is Wayway at approximately 5,000 m (16,000 ft). Other mountains are listed below:

- Antiyuq
- Kampanayuq
- Khuchi Pata
- Maray
- Mina Chaka
- Puka Qucha
- P'unqu Mach'ay
- Qalwa Uqsha
- Qiwlla Qucha
- Rikran Marka
- Tinya Qucha
- Titi Mina
- Waraquyuq
- Wayway

== Climate ==
Climate data for Ricran, elevation 3,674 m (12,054 ft), (1991–2020)
Month	Jan	Feb	Mar	Apr	May	Jun	Jul	Aug	Sep	Oct	Nov	Dec	Year
Mean daily maximum °C (°F)	13.4 (56.1)	13.0 (55.4)	12.8 (55.0)	13.4 (56.1)	14.5 (58.1)	14.2 (57.6)	14.1 (57.4)	14.3 (57.7)	13.7 (56.7)	13.9 (57.0)	14.4 (57.9)	13.2 (55.8)	13.7 (56.7)
Mean daily minimum °C (°F)	5.2 (41.4)	5.4 (41.7)	5.3 (41.5)	4.2 (39.6)	2.1 (35.8)	1.1 (34.0)	0.4 (32.7)	1.1 (34.0)	2.9 (37.2)	4.2 (39.6)	4.7 (40.5)	5.2 (41.4)	3.5 (38.3)
Average precipitation mm (inches)	105.4 (4.15)	113.1 (4.45)	100.9 (3.97)	60.9 (2.40)	20.2 (0.80)	8.1 (0.32)	8.4 (0.33)	8.6 (0.34)	24.1 (0.95)	66.0 (2.60)	67.2 (2.65)	112.4 (4.43)	695.3 (27.39)
Source: National Meteorology and Hydrology Service of Peru
