= Llocllapampa District =

Coordinates: 11.8173°S 75.6264°W

Llocllapampa
- District
- Interactive map of Llocllapampa
- Country: Peru
- Region: Junín
- Province: Jauja
- Founded: October 23, 1896
- Capital: Llocllapampa

Government
  - Mayor: Edwin Fredy Zacarias Torres

Area
  - Total: 110.6 km^{2} (42.7 sq mi)
- Elevation: 3,496 m (11,470 ft)

Population (2005 census)
  - Total: 1,489
  - Density: 13.46/km^{2} (34.87/sq mi)
- Time zone: UTC-5 (PET)
- UBIGEO: 120414

Llocllapampa District is one of the thirty-four districts of the Jauja Province, located in the Department of Junin in central Peru. The district was created in October 23, 1896, during the presidency of Nicolás de Piérola. It encompasses an area of 110.6 km^{2}.
