= Mata Mach'ay =

Mountain in Peru

- Location within Peru

Highest point
- Elevation: 4,400 m (14,400 ft)
- Coordinates: 11°34′49″S 75°41′31″W

Geography
- Location: Peru, Junín Region
- Parent range: Andes

Mata Mach'ay (Quechua mata united, mach'ay cave, "united cave", also spelled Matamachay) is a mountain in the Andes of Peru which reaches a height of approximately 4,400 metres (14,436 ft). It is located in the Junín Region, Jauja Province, Pomacancha District.
