= Waqutuyuq (Junín) =

Mountain in Peru

- Location within Peru

Highest point
- Elevation: 4,200 m (13,800 ft)
- Coordinates: 11°35′36″S 75°42′00″W

Geography
- Location: Peru, Junín Region
- Parent range: Andes

Waqutuyuq (Quechua waqutu a variety of potatoes, -yuq a suffix, "the one with the waqutu", also spelled Huajotuyoc) is a mountain in the Andes of Peru which reaches a height of approximately 4,200 metres (13,780 ft). It is located in the Junín Region, Jauja Province, Pomacancha District.
