= Leonor Ordóñez District =

Coordinates: 11.8603°S 75.4239°W

Leonor Ordóñez
- District
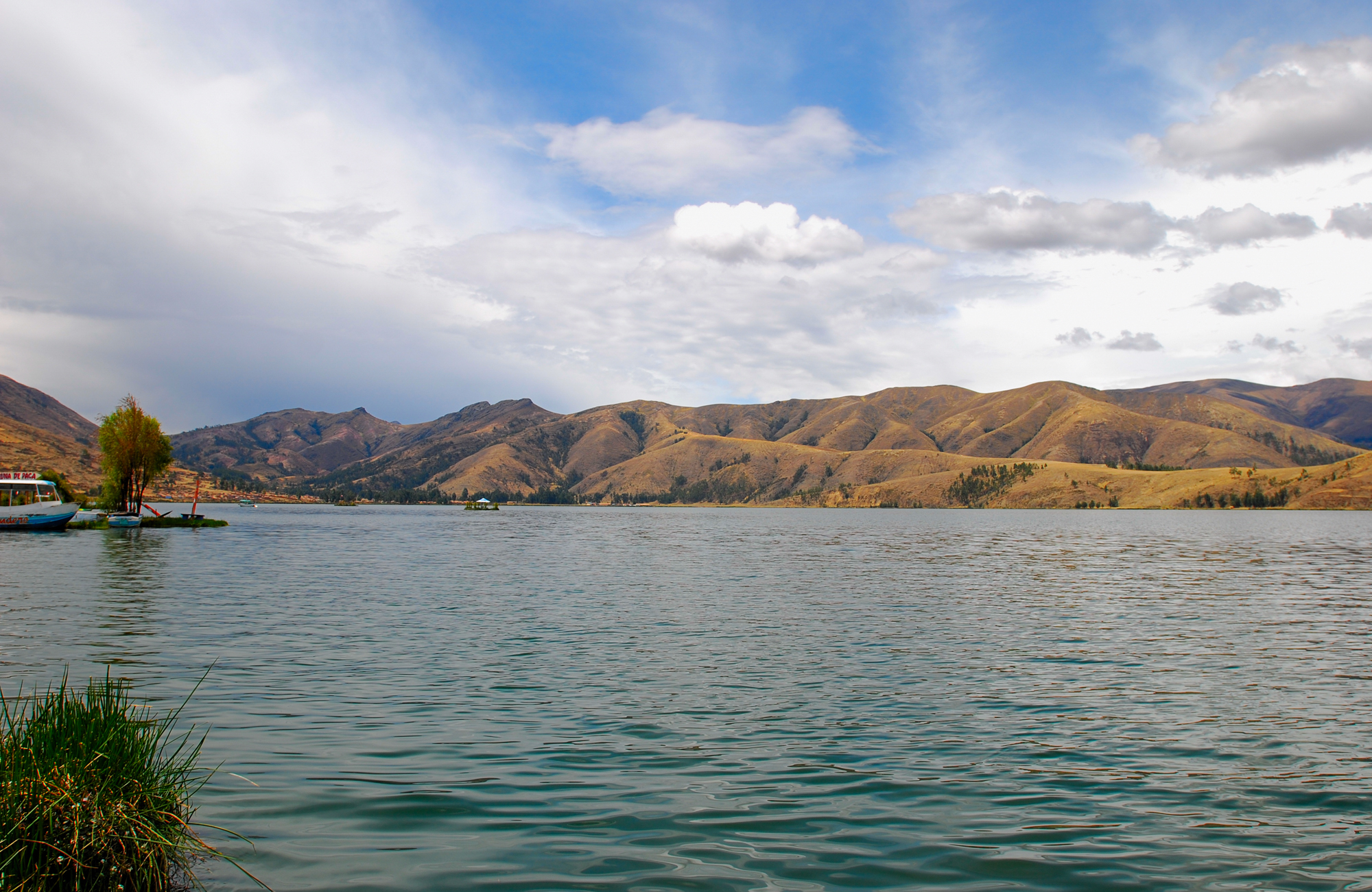
- Interactive map of Leonor Ordóñez
- Country: Peru
- Region: Junín
- Province: Jauja
- Founded: September 29, 1920
- Capital: Huancani

Government
  - Mayor: Juan Miguel Garcia Amaya

Area
  - Total: 20.34 km^{2} (7.85 sq mi)
- Elevation: 3,325 m (10,909 ft)

Population (2005 census)
  - Total: 1,833
  - Density: 90.12/km^{2} (233.4/sq mi)
- Time zone: UTC-5 (PET)
- UBIGEO: 120413

Leonor Ordóñez District is one of thirty-four districts of the province Jauja in Peru. It is named for guerrilla fighter Leonor Ordóñez.
