= Pomacancha District =

Coordinates: 11.7000°S 75.6689°W

Pomacancha Puma Kancha
- District
- Interactive map of Pomacancha
- Country: Peru
- Region: Junín
- Province: Jauja
- Founded: November 20, 1961
- Capital: Pomacancha

Government
  - Mayor: Abel Chavez Rivera

Area
  - Total: 281.61 km^{2} (108.73 sq mi)
- Elevation: 3,806 m (12,487 ft)

Population (2005 census)
  - Total: 2,244
  - Density: 7.968/km^{2} (20.64/sq mi)
- Time zone: UTC-5 (PET)
- UBIGEO: 120426

Pomacancha (from Quechua Puma Kancha, meaning "puma corral") is one of thirty-four districts of the Jauja Province in Peru.

== Geography ==
One of the highest peaks of the district is Mata Mach'ay at approximately 4,400 m (14,400 ft). Other mountains are listed below:

- Kancha Chuqlla
- Kuntur Sinqa
- Muntirayuq
- T'uru Qurin
- Wamanpinta
- Waqraqucha
- Waqutuyuq
