= Huaripampa District =

Coordinates: 11.8085°S 75.4756°W

Huaripampa Waripampa
- District
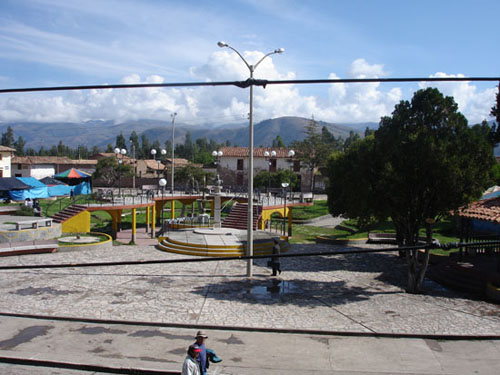
- Huaripampa
- Interactive map of Huaripampa; Waripampa
- Country: Peru
- Region: Junín
- Province: Jauja
- Capital: Huaripampa

Government
  - Mayor: Iban Silvio Soto Soto

Area
  - Total: 14.19 km^{2} (5.48 sq mi)
- Elevation: 3,354 m (11,004 ft)

Population (2005 census)
  - Total: 1,190
  - Density: 83.9/km^{2} (217/sq mi)
- Time zone: UTC-5 (PET)
- UBIGEO: 120409

Huaripampa District is one of thirty-four districts of the province Jauja in Peru.
