= Parco District =

Coordinates: 11.7977°S 75.5496°W

Parco Parqu
- District
- Interactive map of Parco
- Country: Peru
- Region: Junín
- Province: Jauja
- Founded: December 9, 1920
- Capital: Parco District

Government
  - Mayor: Rolando Alcides Mallaupoma Casachagua

Area
  - Total: 32.82 km^{2} (12.67 sq mi)
- Elevation: 3,435 m (11,270 ft)

Population (2005 census)
  - Total: 1,623
  - Density: 49.45/km^{2} (128.1/sq mi)
- Time zone: UTC-5 (PET)
- UBIGEO: 120425

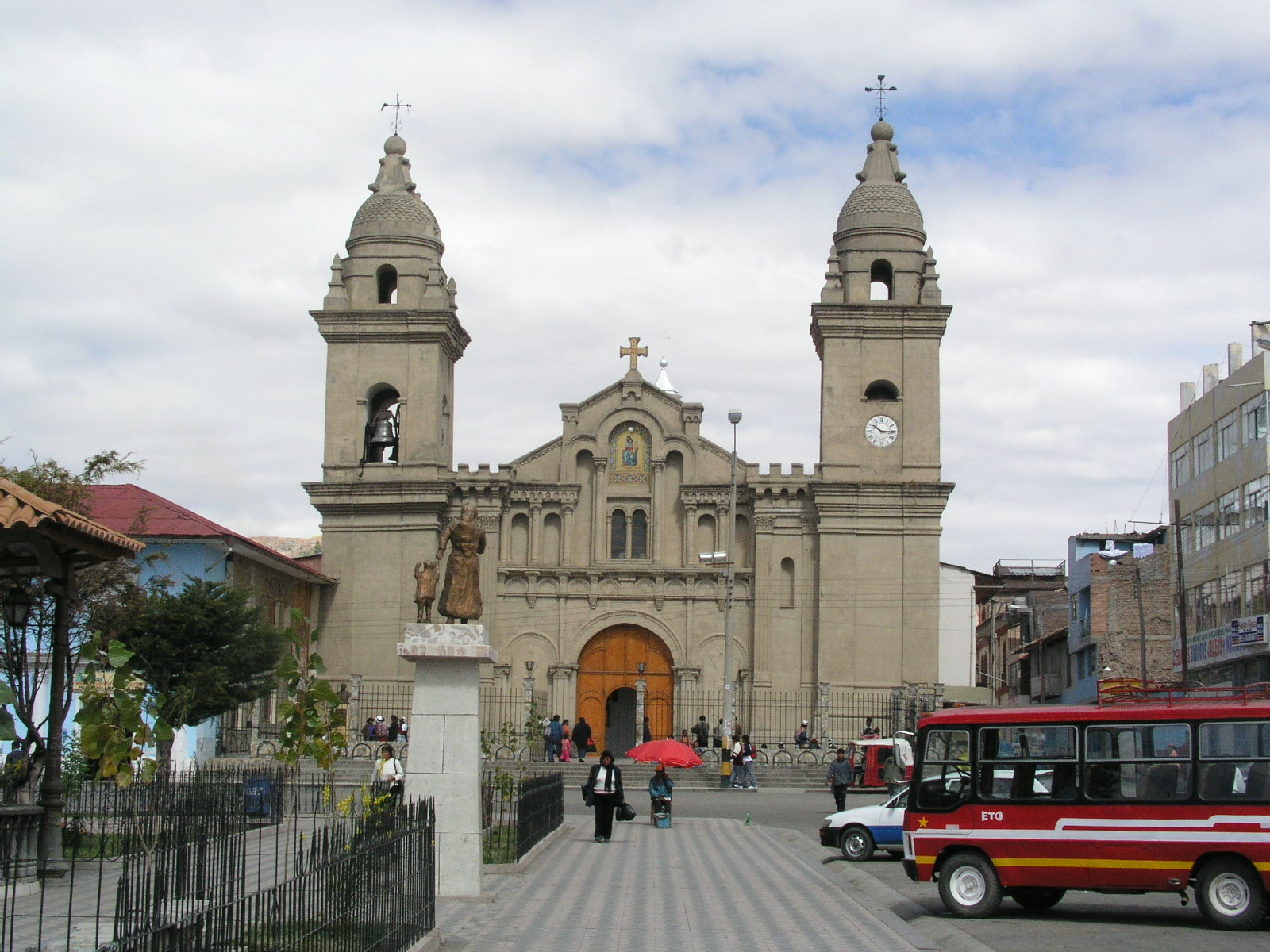
Jauja Cathedral

Parco District is one of thirty-four districts of the province Jauja in Peru.

== Location ==
It is located at 3.435 meters, in an area covering 32.82 km2, exactly at kilometer 60 of the central road on the route from La Oroya to Huancayo in the Junín Region, Jauja Province.

== See also ==
- Waqlamarka
