= Molinos District =

Coordinates: 11.7368°S 75.4503°W

Molinos
- District
- Interactive map of Molinos
- Country: Peru
- Region: Junín
- Province: Jauja
- Founded: January 9, 1956
- Capital: Molinos

Government
  - Mayor: Cesar Roberto Lopez Sanchez

Area
  - Total: 312.17 km^{2} (120.53 sq mi)
- Elevation: 3,430 m (11,250 ft)

Population (2005 census)
  - Total: 2,224
  - Density: 7.124/km^{2} (18.45/sq mi)
- Time zone: UTC-5 (PET)
- UBIGEO: 120418

Molinos District is one of thirty-four districts of the province Jauja in Peru.

== See also ==
- Uqsha Mach'ay
