= Tunan Marca District =

Coordinates: 11.7162°S 75.6253°W

Tunan Marca Tunan Marka
- District
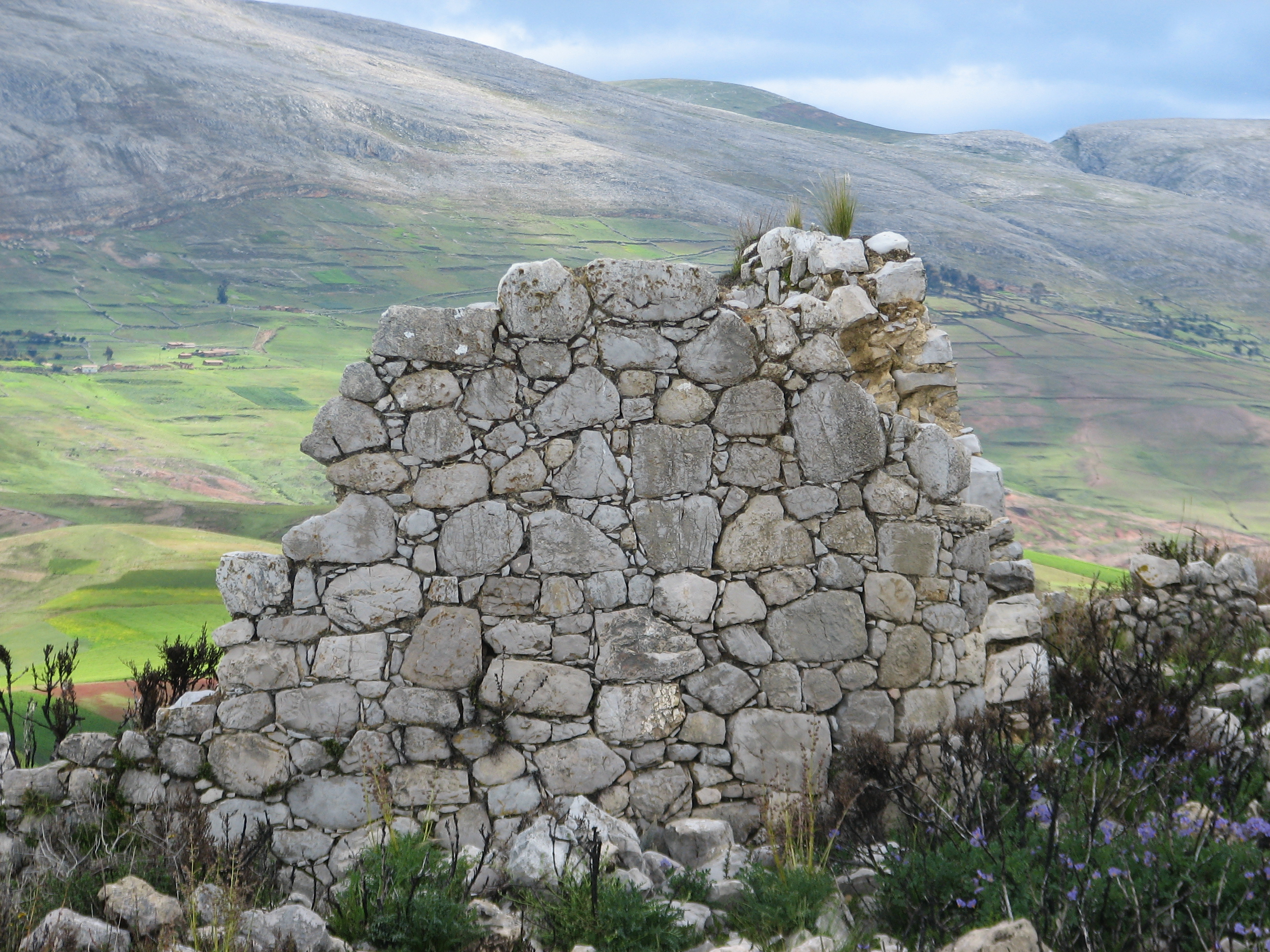
- Ruins at the archaeological site of Tunanmarka
- Interactive map of Tunan Marca
- Country: Peru
- Region: Junín
- Province: Jauja
- Founded: September 15, 1944
- Capital: Concho

Government
  - Mayor: Braulio Abilio Tabraj Flores

Area
  - Total: 30.07 km^{2} (11.61 sq mi)
- Elevation: 3,470 m (11,380 ft)

Population (2005 census)
  - Total: 1,357
  - Density: 45.13/km^{2} (116.9/sq mi)
- Time zone: UTC-5 (PET)
- UBIGEO: 120432

Tunan Marca District is one of thirty-four districts of the province Jauja in Peru.

== See also ==
- Tunanmarka
