= Masma District =

Coordinates: 11.7846°S 75.4338°W

Masma
- District
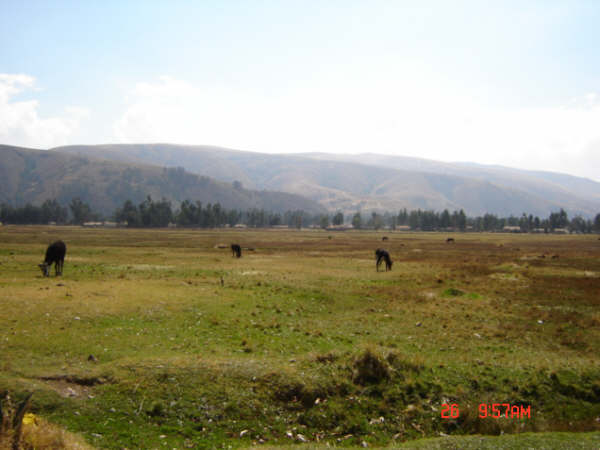
- Interactive map of Masma
- Country: Peru
- Region: Junín
- Province: Jauja
- Founded: October 02, 1916
- Capital: Masma

Government
  - Mayor: Silvio Astete Benites

Area
  - Total: 14.26 km^{2} (5.51 sq mi)
- Elevation: 3,460 m (11,350 ft)

Population (2005 census)
  - Total: 2,118
  - Density: 148.5/km^{2} (384.7/sq mi)
- Time zone: UTC-5 (PET)
- UBIGEO: 120416

Masma District is one of thirty-four districts of the province Jauja in Peru.
