= T'uru Qurin =

Mountain in Peru

- Location within Peru

Highest point
- Elevation: 4,200 m (13,800 ft)
- Coordinates: 11°36′23″S 75°40′03″W

Geography
- Location: Peru, Junín Region
- Parent range: Andes

T'uru Qurin (Quechua t'uru mud, quri gold, "mud gold", -n a suffix, also spelled Turojurin) is a mountain in the Andes of Peru which reaches a height of approximately 4,200 metres (13,780 ft). It is located in the Junín Region, Jauja Province, Pomacancha District.
