= Sausa District =

Coordinates: 11.7936°S 75.4865°W

Sausa
- District
- Interactive map of Sausa
- Country: Peru
- Region: Junín
- Province: Jauja
- Founded: February 24, 1965
- Capital: Sausa

Government
  - Mayor: Cesar Teodoro Rodriguez Huarizueca

Area
  - Total: 4.5 km^{2} (1.7 sq mi)
- Elevation: 3,380 m (11,090 ft)

Population (2005 census)
  - Total: 2,892
  - Density: 640/km^{2} (1,700/sq mi)
- Time zone: UTC-5 (PET)
- UBIGEO: 120430

Sausa District is one of thirty-four districts of the province of Jauja (Quechua: Shawsha or Sausa) in Peru.
