= Huertas District =

Coordinates: 11.7646°S 75.4807°W

Huertas
- District
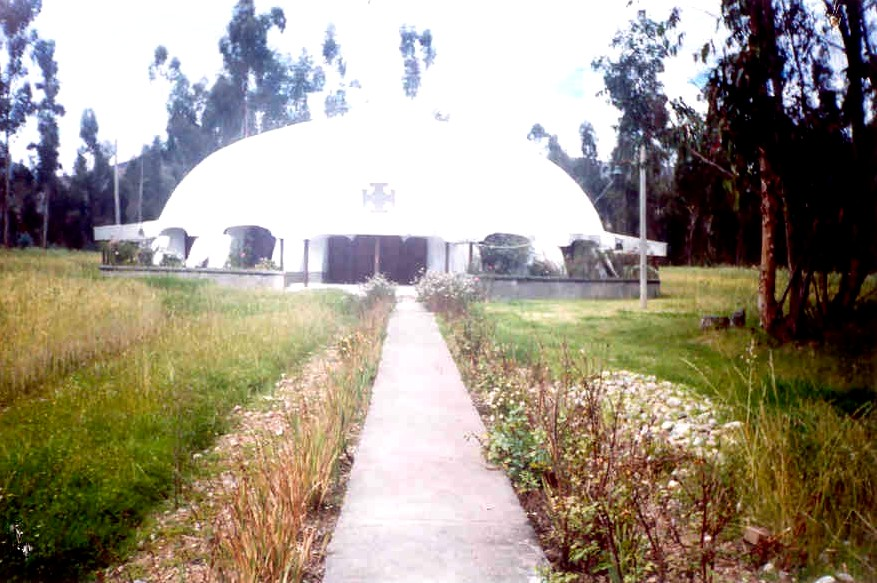
- Yogas
- Interactive map of Huertas
- Country: Peru
- Region: Junín
- Province: Jauja
- Founded: January 12, 1954
- Capital: Huertas

Government
  - Mayor: Domingo Felipe Aylas Valenzuela

Area
  - Total: 11.82 km^{2} (4.56 sq mi)
- Elevation: 3,380 m (11,090 ft)

Population (2005 census)
  - Total: 2,082
  - Density: 176.1/km^{2} (456.2/sq mi)
- Time zone: UTC-5 (PET)
- UBIGEO: 120410

Huertas District is one of thirty-four districts of the province Jauja in Peru.
