= Marco District =

Coordinates: 11.7384°S 75.5678°W

Marco
- District
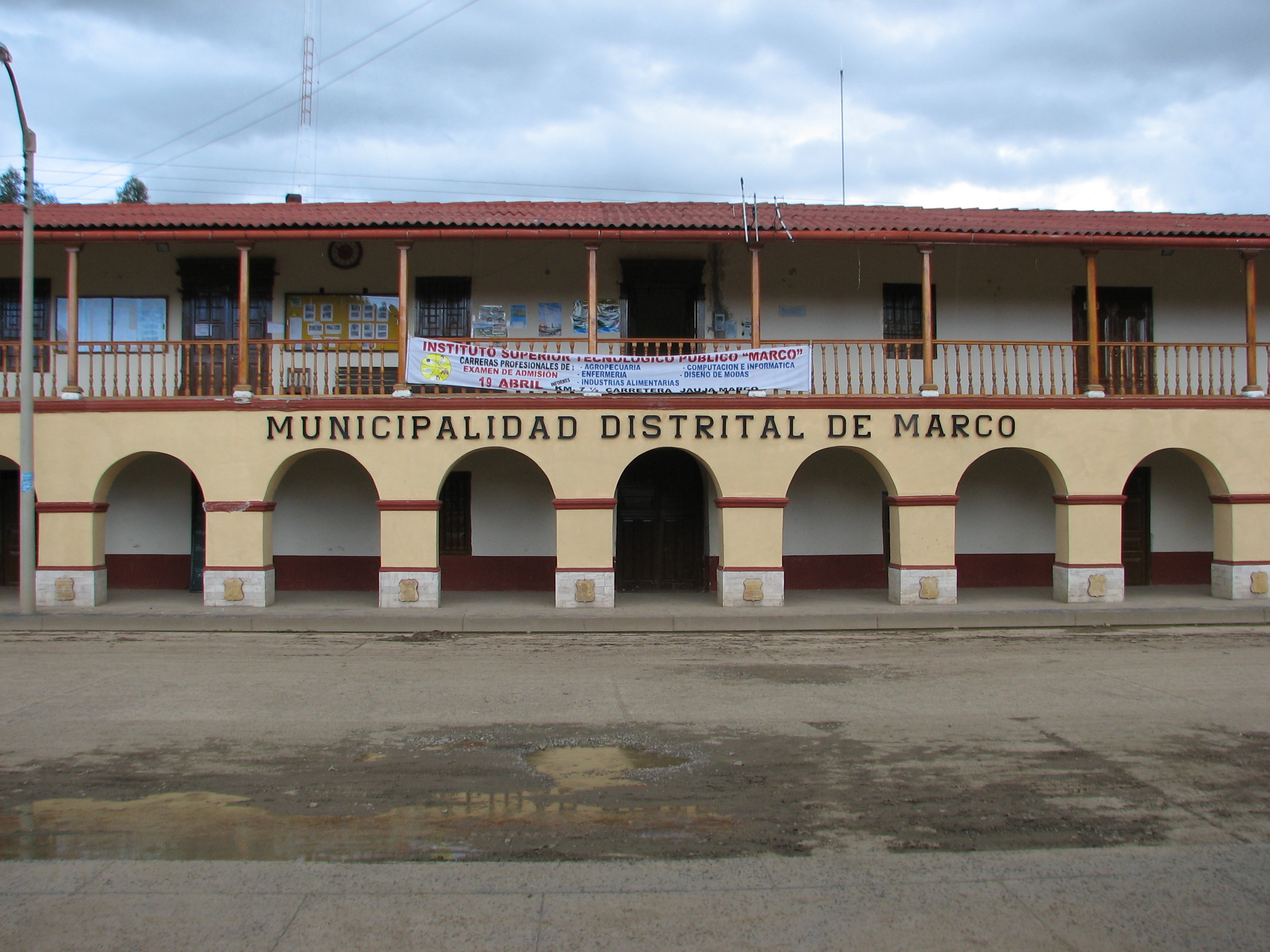
- Interactive map of Marco
- Country: Peru
- Region: Junín
- Province: Jauja
- Founded: October 16, 1907
- Capital: Marco

Government
  - Mayor: Papias Taquiri Carhuancho

Area
  - Total: 28.8 km^{2} (11.1 sq mi)
- Elevation: 3,461 m (11,355 ft)

Population (2005 census)
  - Total: 2,526
  - Density: 87.7/km^{2} (227/sq mi)
- Time zone: UTC-5 (PET)
- UBIGEO: 120415

Marco District is one of thirty-four districts of the province Jauja in Peru.

== See also ==
- Hatunmarka
