= Paca District =

Coordinates: 11.7056°S 75.5183°W

Paca
- District
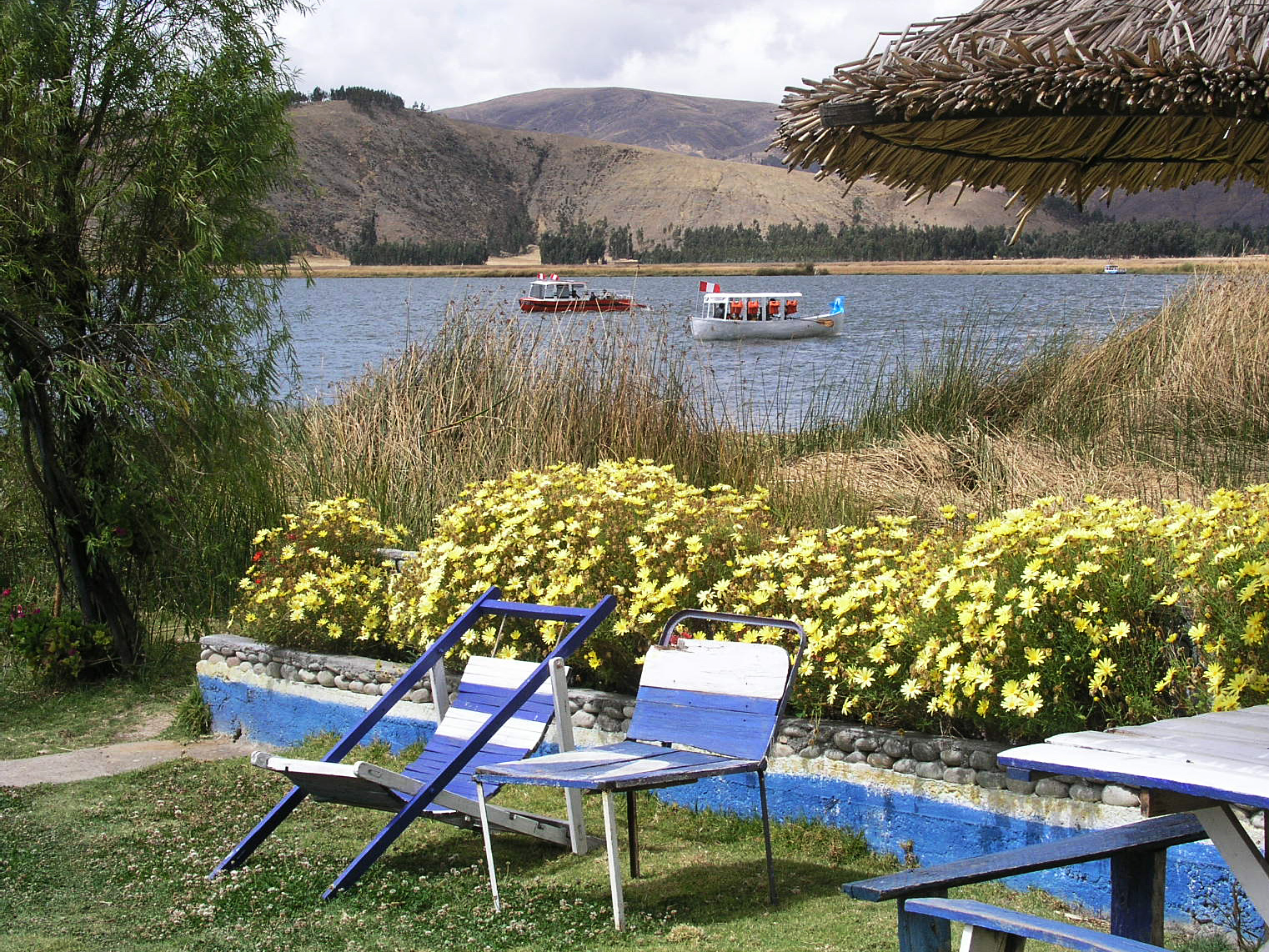
- A lake in the Paca District
- Interactive map of Paca
- Country: Peru
- Region: Junín
- Province: Jauja
- Founded: September 30, 1943
- Capital: Paca

Government
  - Mayor: Owen Benigno Poves Pizarro

Area
  - Total: 34.22 km^{2} (13.21 sq mi)
- Elevation: 3,390 m (11,120 ft)

Population (2017)
  - Total: 892
  - Density: 26.1/km^{2} (67.5/sq mi)
- Time zone: UTC-5 (PET)
- UBIGEO: 120422

Paca District is one of thirty-four districts of the province Jauja in Peru.
