= Julcán District, Jauja =

Coordinates: 11.7614°S 75.4432°W

Julcán District
- District
- Interactive map of Julcán District
- Country: Peru
- Region: Junín
- Province: Jauja
- Founded: January 21, 1925
- Capital: Julcán

Government
  - Mayor: Felix Mabi Ildefonso Quispe

Area
  - Total: 24.78 km^{2} (9.57 sq mi)
- Elevation: 3,460 m (11,350 ft)

Population (2005 census)
  - Total: 814
  - Density: 32.8/km^{2} (85.1/sq mi)
- Time zone: UTC-5 (PET)
- UBIGEO: 120412

Julcán District is one of thirty-four districts of the province Jauja in Peru.
