= Muquiyauyo District =

Coordinates: 11.8155°S 75.4591°W

Muquiyauyo
- District
- Interactive map of Muquiyauyo
- Country: Peru
- Region: Junín
- Province: Jauja
- Founded: October 26, 1886
- Capital: Muquiyauyo

Government
  - Mayor: José Eugenio Salcedo Castillo

Area
  - Total: 19.86 km^{2} (7.67 sq mi)
- Elevation: 3,342 m (10,965 ft)

Population (2005 census)
  - Total: 2,636
  - Density: 132.7/km^{2} (343.8/sq mi)
- Time zone: UTC-5 (PET)
- UBIGEO: 120421

Muquiyauyo District is one of thirty-four districts of the province Jauja in Peru.
