= Huamalí District =

Huamalí
- District
- Interactive map of Huamalí
- Coordinates: 11.805°S 75.419°W
- Country: Peru
- Region: Junín
- Province: Jauja
- Founded: December 4, 1911
- Capital: Huamalí

Government
  - Mayor: Reynaldo Julian Palomino Granados

Area
  - Total: 20.19 km^{2} (7.80 sq mi)
- Elevation: 3,339 m (10,955 ft)

Population (2005 census)
  - Total: 2,118
  - Density: 104.9/km^{2} (271.7/sq mi)
- Time zone: UTC-5 (PET)
- UBIGEO: 120408

Huamalí District is one of thirty-four districts of the Jauja Province, located in the Department of Junín in central Peru. The district was created by the Law No. 1490 in December 4, 1911, during the presidency of Augusto B. Leguía. It encompasses an area of 20.19 km^{2}.
