= Jauja District =

Coordinates: 11.7803°S 75.5065°W

Jauja
- District
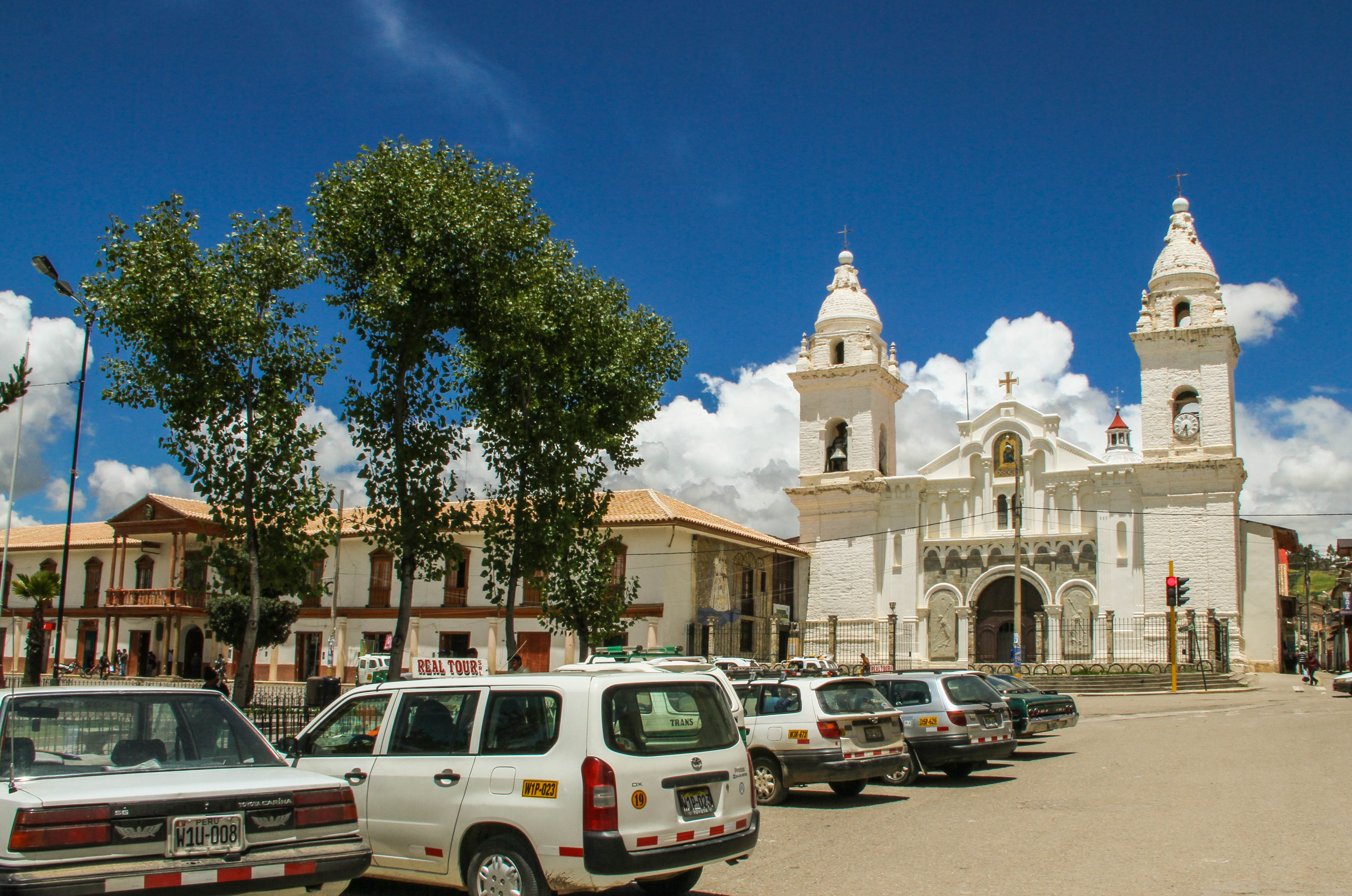
- Main square in Jauja
- Interactive map of Jauja
- Country: Peru
- Region: Junín
- Province: Jauja
- Capital: Jauja

Government
  - Mayor: Ivan Torres Acevedo.

Area
  - Total: 10.1 km^{2} (3.9 sq mi)
- Elevation: 3,340 m (10,960 ft)

Population (2005 census)
  - Total: 16,695
  - Density: 1,650/km^{2} (4,280/sq mi)
- Time zone: UTC-5 (PET)
- UBIGEO: 120401

Jauja District is one of thirty-four districts of the province Jauja in Peru.
