= Paccha District, Jauja =

Coordinates: 11.8517°S 75.5097°W

Paccha
- District
- Interactive map of Paccha
- Country: Peru
- Region: Junín
- Province: Jauja
- Founded: June 15, 1920
- Capital: Paccha

Government
  - Mayor: Leobardo Aydon Carlos Davila

Area
  - Total: 90.86 km^{2} (35.08 sq mi)
- Elevation: 3,741 m (12,274 ft)

Population (2005 census)
  - Total: 2,413
  - Density: 26.56/km^{2} (68.78/sq mi)
- Time zone: UTC-5 (PET)
- UBIGEO: 120423

Paccha District is one of thirty-four districts of the province Jauja in Peru.
