= Masma Chicche District =

Coordinates: 11.7833°S 75.3797°W

Masma Chicche
- District
- Interactive map of Masma Chicche
- Country: Peru
- Region: Junín
- Province: Jauja
- Founded: February 28, 1964
- Capital: Masma Chicche

Government
  - Mayor: Walter Magno Ninahuanca Ramirez

Area
  - Total: 29.86 km^{2} (11.53 sq mi)
- Elevation: 3,650 m (11,980 ft)

Population (2005 census)
  - Total: 1,027
  - Density: 34.39/km^{2} (89.08/sq mi)
- Time zone: UTC-5 (PET)
- UBIGEO: 120417

Masma Chicche District is one of thirty-four districts of the province Jauja in Peru.
