= Kuntur Sinqa (Jauja) =

Mountain in Peru

- Location within Peru

Highest point
- Elevation: 4,000 m (13,000 ft)
- Coordinates: 11°38′37″S 75°41′37″W

Geography
- Location: Peru, Junín Region
- Parent range: Andes, Cordillera Central

Kuntur Sinqa (Quechua kuntur condor, sinqa nose, "condor nose", also spelled Condorsenga) is a mountain in the Cordillera Central in the Andes of Peru which reaches a height of approximately 4,000 metres (13,123 ft). It is located in the Junín Region, Jauja Province, Pomacancha District.
