= Janjaillo District =

Coordinates: 11.7498°S 75.6213°W

Janjaillo
- District
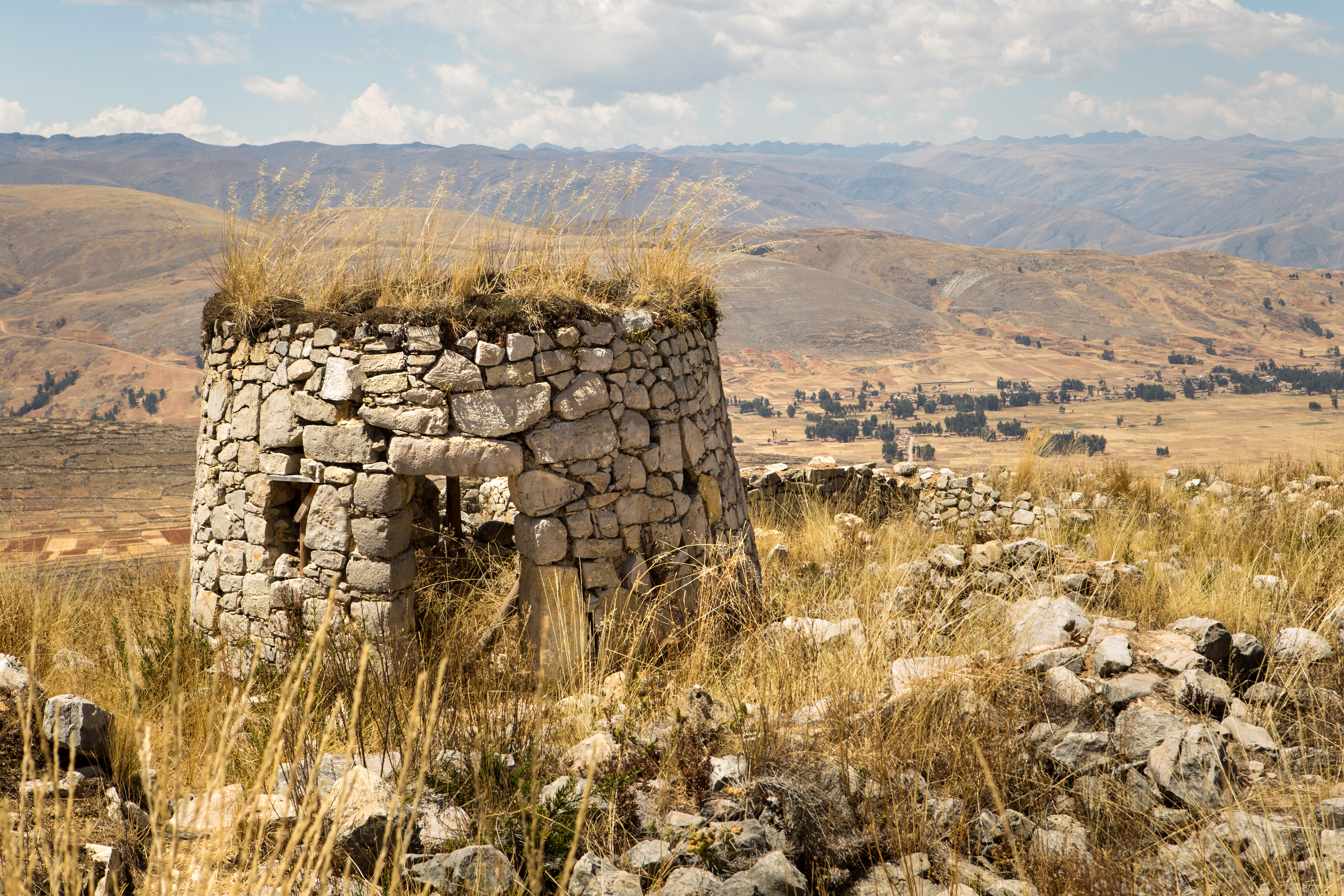
- Interactive map of Janjaillo
- Country: Peru
- Region: Junín
- Province: Jauja
- Founded: April 15, 1959
- Capital: Janjaillo

Government
  - Mayor: Lucila Barrera Arias

Area
  - Total: 31.57 km^{2} (12.19 sq mi)
- Elevation: 3,698 m (12,133 ft)

Population (2005 census)
  - Total: 1,228
  - Density: 38.90/km^{2} (100.7/sq mi)
- Time zone: UTC-5 (PET)
- UBIGEO: 120411

Janjaillo District is one of thirty-four districts of the province Jauja in Peru.
