= El Mantaro District =

Coordinates: 11.8202°S 75.3881°W

El Mantaro
- District
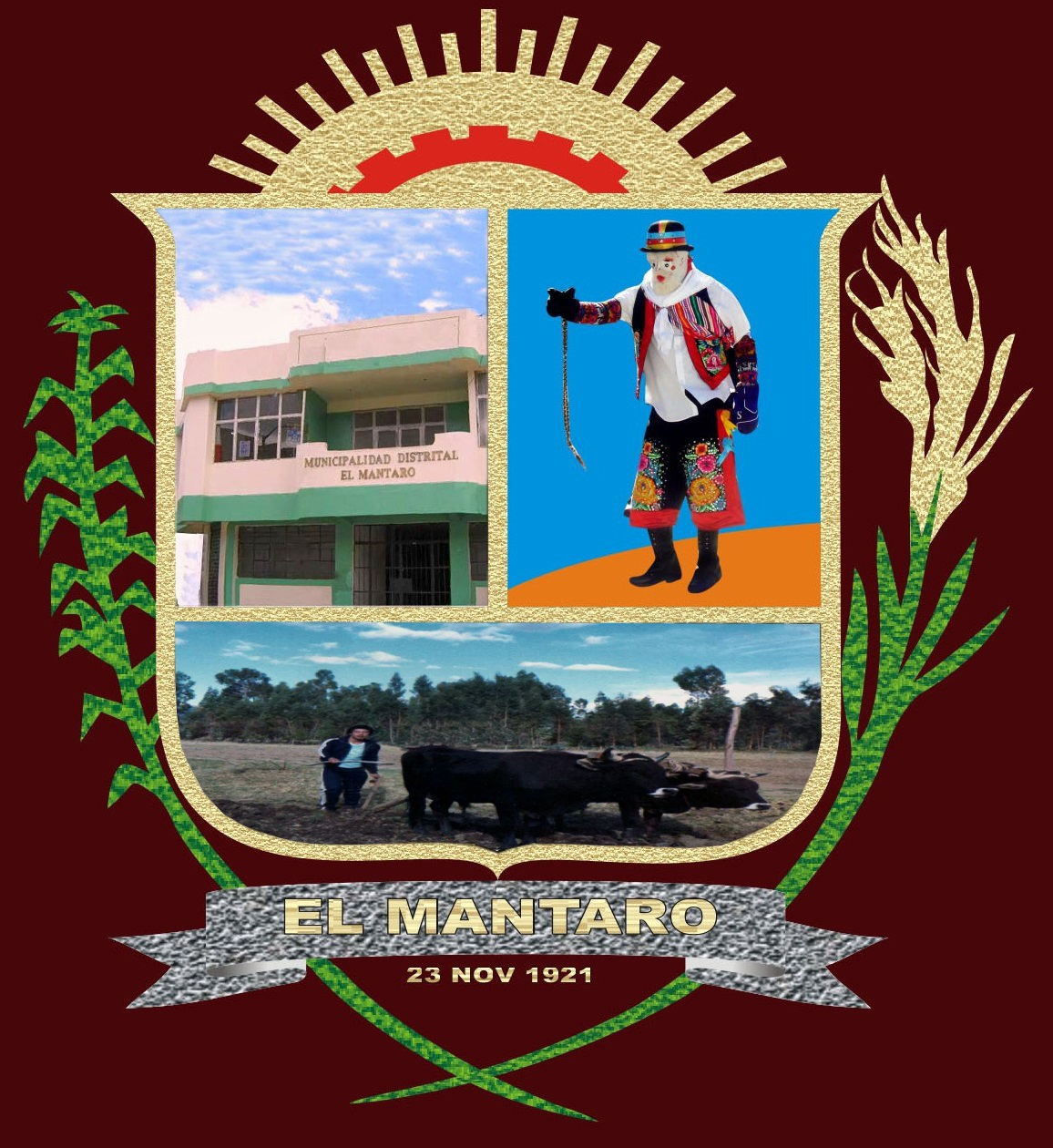
- Coat of arms
- Interactive map of El Mantaro
- Country: Peru
- Region: Junín
- Province: Jauja
- Founded: October 23, 1921
- Capital: Pucucho

Area
  - Total: 17.76 km^{2} (6.86 sq mi)
- Elevation: 3,320 m (10,890 ft)

Population (2005 census)
  - Total: 2,870
  - Density: 162/km^{2} (419/sq mi)
- Time zone: UTC-5 (PET)
- UBIGEO: 120407
- Website: www.distritomantaro.org

El Mantaro District is one of thirty-four districts of the Jauja Province, located in the Department of Junín in Peru. The district was created by the Law No. 4404 in November 23, 1921, during the presidency of Augusto B. Leguía. It encompasses an area of 17.76 km^{2}.
