= Uqsha Mach'ay =

Mountain in Peru

- Location within Peru

Highest point
- Elevation: 4,800 m (15,700 ft)
- Coordinates: 11°37′34″S 75°17′21″W

Geography
- Location: Peru, Junín Region
- Parent range: Andes

Uqsha Mach'ay (local Quechua uqsha (uqsa) a high altitude grass, Quechua mach'ay cave, also spelled Ocshamachay) is a mountain in the Andes of Peru which reaches a height of approximately 4,800 metres (15,748 ft). It is located in the Junín Region, Jauja Province, on the border of the districts of Apata and Molinos.
