= T'uruqucha (Junín) =

Mountain in Peru

- Location within Peru

Highest point
- Elevation: 4,800 m (15,700 ft)
- Coordinates: 11°42′16″S 75°12′40″W

Geography
- Location: Peru, Junín Region
- Parent range: Andes

T'uruqucha (Quechua t'uru mud, qucha lake, "mud lake", also spelled Torococha) is a mountain in the Andes of Peru which reaches a height of approximately 4,800 metres (15,748 ft). It is located in the Junín Region, Jauja Province, Apata District. T'uruqucha lies south of Utkhulasu.
