= Tunanmarca =

Archaeological site in Peru

- Tunan Marca, Siquillapucara
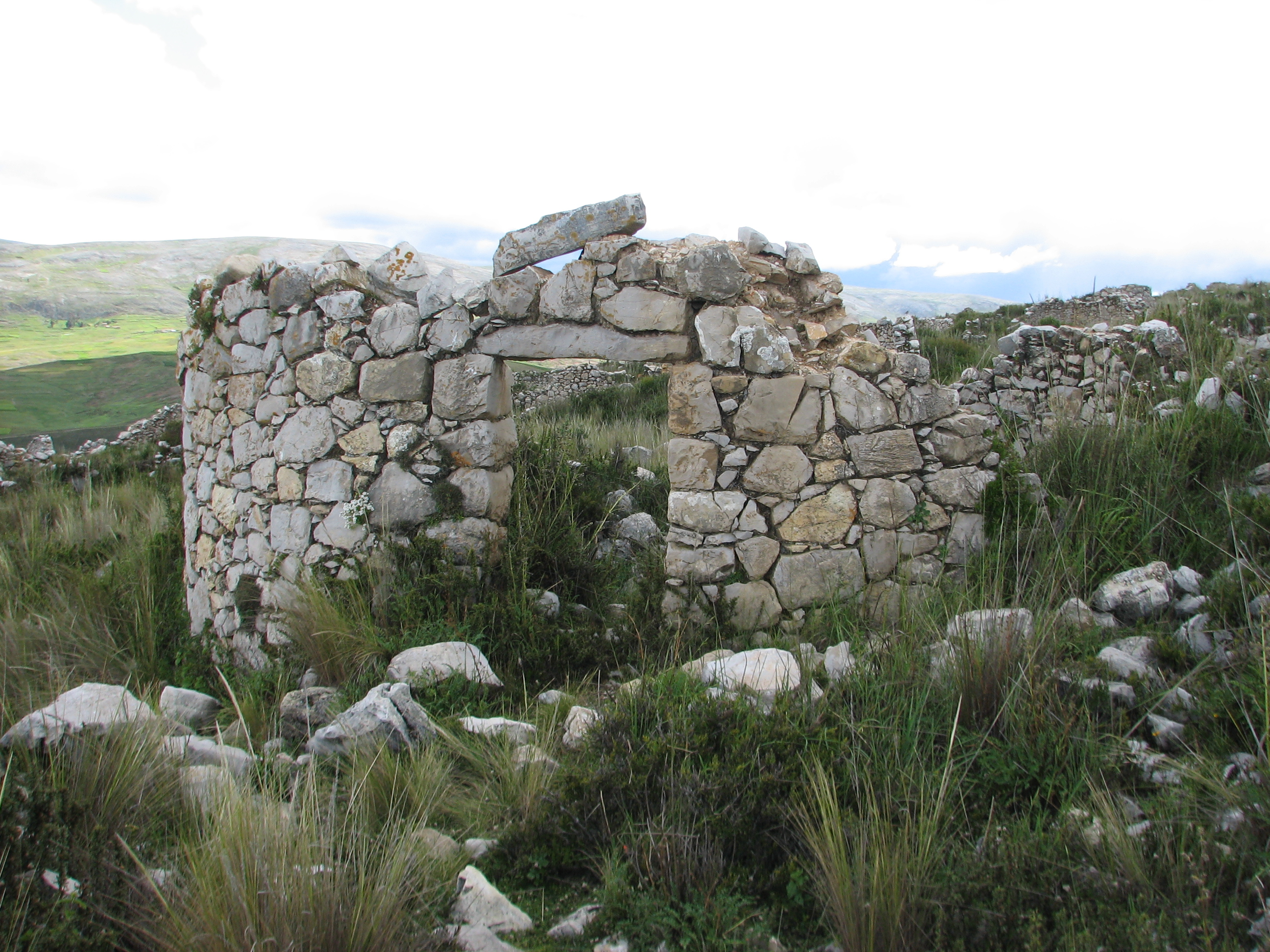
- The ruins of a storage building at Tunanmarka

- Location within Peru
- 11°43′12.2″S 75°35′54.9″W
- Location: Peru, Junín Region, Jauja Province

Tunanmarca, Tunan Marca or Siquillapucara is an archaeological site in Peru. It is located in the Junín Region, Jauja Province, Tunan Marca District. The site was declared a National Cultural Heritage by Resolución Directoral Nacional No. 1359/INC on November 9, 2000.

== Commemorative Coin ==
On 26 Nov 2013 the Central Reserve Bank of Peru issued 10,000 new 1 Nuevo Sol coin featuring Tunanmarca buildings and including the engraving 1 NUEVO SOL TUNANMARCA S. XIII - XVI d.c.. The coin was part of a series named the Wealth and Pride of Peru Series.

== See also ==
- Hatunmarka
