= San Pedro de Chunan District =

Coordinates: 11.7247°S 75.4918°W

San Pedro de Chunan
- District
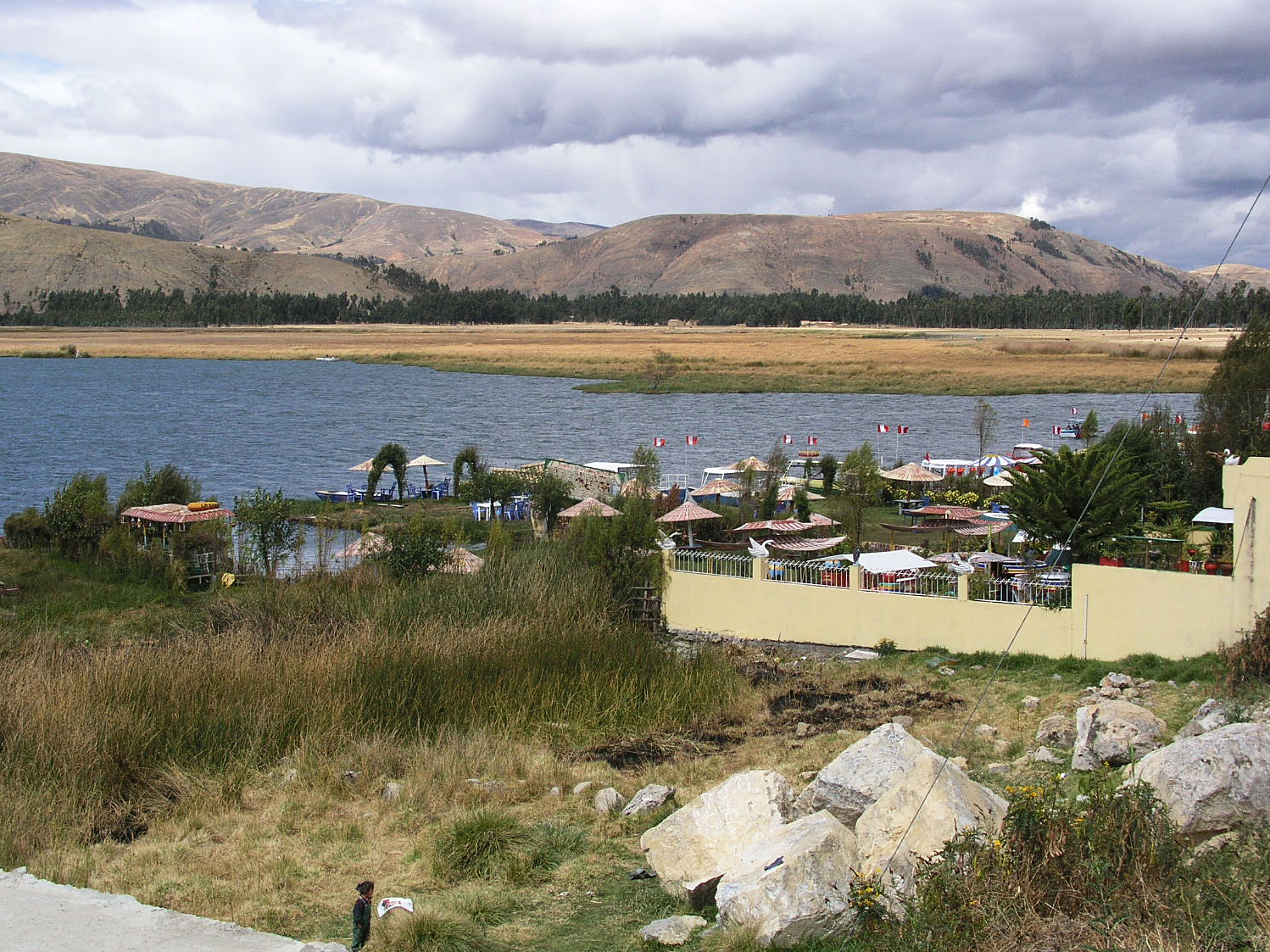
- Interactive map of San Pedro de Chunan
- Country: Peru
- Region: Junín
- Province: Jauja
- Founded: December 14, 1954
- Capital: San Pedro de Chunan

Government
  - Mayor: Meliton Walter Diaz Maita

Area
  - Total: 8.44 km^{2} (3.26 sq mi)
- Elevation: 3,390 m (11,120 ft)

Population (2005 census)
  - Total: 880
  - Density: 100/km^{2} (270/sq mi)
- Time zone: UTC-5 (PET)
- UBIGEO: 120429

San Pedro de Chunan District is one of thirty-four districts of the province Jauja in Peru.
