= Ataura District =

Coordinates: 11.8027°S 75.4415°W

Ataura
- District
- Interactive map of Ataura
- Country: Peru
- Region: Junín
- Province: Jauja
- Founded: March 27, 1935
- Capital: Ataura

Government
  - Mayor: Jorge Julio Bullon Galarza

Area
  - Total: 5.9 km^{2} (2.3 sq mi)
- Elevation: 3,344 m (10,971 ft)

Population (2005 census)
  - Total: 1,335
  - Density: 230/km^{2} (590/sq mi)
- Time zone: UTC-5 (PET)
- UBIGEO: 120404

Ataura District is one of thirty-four districts of the Jauja Province, located in the Department of Junín in Peru. The district was created in March 27, 1935, during the presidency of Óscar R. Benavides. It encompasses an area of 5.9 km^{2}.
