= Mantaro Valley =

Fluvial inter-Andean valley in Junin, Peru

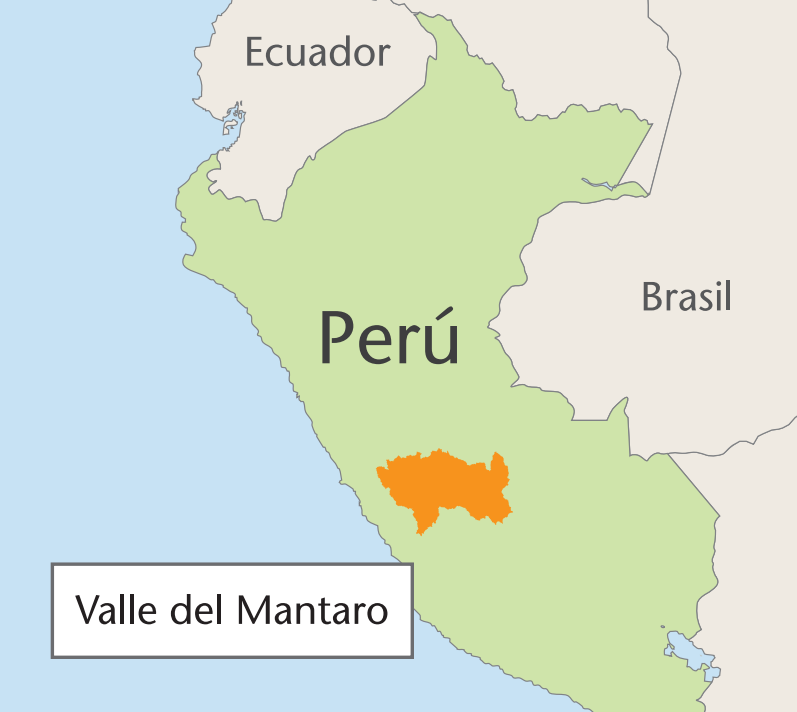
- Location in Peru

- Location within Peru
- Coordinates: 11°55′S 75°20′W
- Country: Peru
- Region: Junin
- Elevation: 3,300 m (10,800 ft)
- Time zone: UTC-5 (PET)
  - Summer (DST): UTC-5 (PET)

The Mantaro Valley, also known as Jauja Valley, is a fluvial inter-Andean valley of Junin region, 200 kilometres (120 mi) east of Lima, the capital of Peru. The Mantaro River flows through the fertile valley which produces potatoes, maize, and vegetables among other crops. The Mantaro Valley is also renowned as an area containing many archaeological sites. At the northern end of the valley is the city of Jauja, an important pre-Columbian city and Peru's provisional capital in 1534. Huancayo is the largest city in the valley.

== Geography ==
The Mantaro Valley is a north–south trending valley about 60 kilometres (37 mi) long between the cities of Jauja and Huancayo, Peru. The Mantaro River bisects the valley, emerging from a steep gorge at the northern end of the valley and entering another steep gorge at its southern end. The valley floor averages about 10 kilometres (6.2 mi) wide at elevations ranging from 3,150 metres (10,330 ft) to 3,500 metres (11,500 ft). The land on either side rises to mountain ranges of more than 4,500 metres (14,800 ft) elevation. The highest mountain in the area is Huaytapallana, 14 miles northeast of Huancayo, which has an elevation of 5,567 metres (18,264 ft).

The broad Mantaro valley is unusual in the Andes as it possesses a large amount of arable land. Thus, dating back to Pre-Columbian times, it has been a breadbasket for the people of the Andes. The valley contains about 65,000 hectares (160,000 acres) of arable land ranging in elevation from 3,150 metres (10,330 ft) to 4,200 metres (13,800 ft), the highest elevation at which cultivation is possible in this area.

== Culture in the Mantaro Valley ==
It was inhabited by the Wanka (Huanca) people – a self-governing nation with a reputation for producing strong warriors and whose spiritual practices placed an emphasis on remembering their ancestors' role in the mystique of the Mantaro Valley. In some cases, descendants actually form part of the valley. One legend in particular includes that of the "guerrero" or soldier, who courts a mermaid in Laguna de Paca, a lake in the valley largely isolated, and courts the mermaid each night; she moans and cries for him to join her, then she disappears beneath the surface. One night, she disappears into the water, and the soldier jumps in after her. He looks under the water for the mermaid, but runs out of air and gives up. His body is lost, but now appears as a mountain range present surrounding the valley in the shape of a man's body. This legend of the Huancan warrior of Laguna de Paca has numerous variations and explains the deep connection many residents of the town of Paca have with the Mantaro Valley.

The Huanca (or Wanka) people were eventually subdued during the reign of the Inca King Pachacutec, but in revenge for their oppression took sides with the Spanish during their conquest of Peru. Eventually the Spanish, in their quest to suppress paganism, got tired of their allies, and destroyed an important temple of the Huanca – Wariwillka (A temple constructed some 1000 years ago near the city of Huancayo)

Archaeologists have focused on the 2,573 Inca qullqas (storage silos, or colcas) in the Mantaro Valley which was one of the largest and most fertile areas of the Inca Empire. The Incas placed great emphasis on storing agricultural products and other goods and the Mantaro Valley has more qullqas than any other region of Peru. Half of the 2,573 qullqas were placed in the center of this maize and potato producing area and the other half were scattered among 48 compounds along the course of the river. In total, the qullqas of the Mantaro Valley had a storage area of 170,000 cubic meters, possibly the largest storage facilities in the Inca Empire and in pre-Columbian America. Illustrating the quantity of stored items, these qullqas supplied and equipped an army of 35,000 soldiers during the Spanish conquest of the 1530s.

In the 18th and early 19th century, the Convent of Santa Rosa de Ocopa was the headquarters of a far-flung missionary enterprise of the Franciscans who established missions in the rain forests of the Amazon Basin with the objective of converting the indigenous people to Christianity.

== Climate ==
The weather is divided into three distinct seasons – the rainy season from November to April, winter from May to July and the dry sunny season, with strong winds from August to October. To the average citizen, both the landscape and the weather play a crucial role for health and prosperity, and abundance from year to year determines how intricate the festivals described above are achieved. A changing climate is now observed by local people. They note that, in the last five years, the "rainy season" increasingly starts in September and October, shortening significantly the drier seasons. Treasured landmarks such as the Nevado Huaytapallana, when compared to 30 years ago, have much less glacial ice during the peak dry season. This is a crucial water source feeding the Mantaro River, and some estimates suggest that within 10 years there will be no ice left on the mountain.

== Local Crafts ==
There are numerous small towns in the valley, several of them famous for their own particular crafts. The town of Hualhuas is known for its tapestries, blankets and sweaters, and where it is possible to see the craftspeople working at their weaving looms. Molinos is noted for woodcarving. San Jeronimo de Tunan is famous for its intricately designed and crafted silver filigree jewellery. Aco and Quilcas specialise in ceramics and San Agustin de Cajas in hats of sheep wool. Mito has the tradition of making wooden masks, and Viques has artisans who specialise in colorful belts and blankets. The twin towns of Cochas Grande and Cochas Chico are famous for their intricate carvings on gourds, which are imported from other regions of Peru. These buriladores or carvers practice burilado, a craft of burning intricate creation designs on the surface of gourds (macas).
