= Muqui District =

Coordinates: 11.8329°S 75.4322°W

Muqui
- District
- Interactive map of Muqui
- Country: Peru
- Region: Junín
- Province: Jauja
- Founded: June 10, 1955
- Capital: Muqui

Government
  - Mayor: Hugo Hesiquio Munguia Silvera

Area
  - Total: 11.74 km^{2} (4.53 sq mi)
- Elevation: 3,322 m (10,899 ft)

Population (2005 census)
  - Total: 1,171
  - Density: 99.74/km^{2} (258.3/sq mi)
- Time zone: UTC-5 (PET)
- UBIGEO: 120420

Muqui District is one of thirty-four districts of the province Jauja in Peru.
