= Yauli District, Jauja =

Coordinates: 11.7149°S 75.4775°W

Yauli
- District
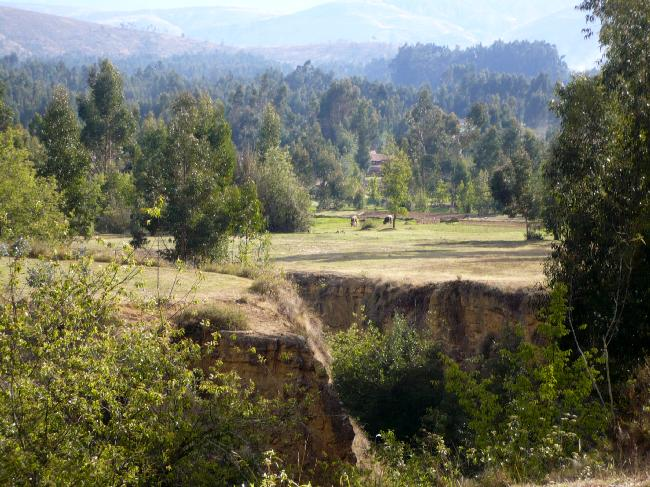
- Yauli District 2008
- Interactive map of Yauli
- Country: Peru
- Region: Junín
- Province: Jauja
- Founded: January 20, 1944
- Capital: Yauli

Government
  - Mayor: Neil Gilmar Ildefonso Quispe

Area
  - Total: 93.15 km^{2} (35.97 sq mi)
- Elevation: 3,400 m (11,200 ft)

Population (2005 census)
  - Total: 1,718
  - Density: 18.44/km^{2} (47.77/sq mi)
- Time zone: UTC-5 (PET)
- UBIGEO: 120433

Yauli District is one of thirty-four districts of the province Jauja in Peru.
