= Acolla District =

Coordinates: 11.7298°S 75.5508°W

Acolla Aqulla
- District
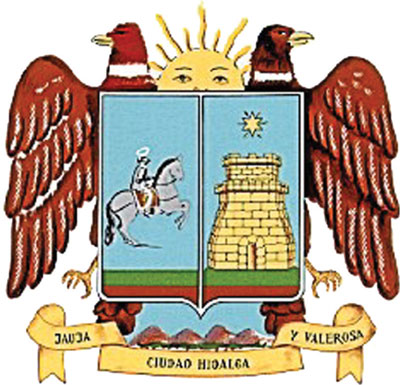
- Coat of arms
- Interactive map of Acolla
- Country: Peru
- Region: Junín
- Province: Jauja
- Founded: October 26, 1886
- Capital: Acolla

Government
  - Mayor: Edwin Eugenio Manyari Carhuay

Area
  - Total: 122.4 km^{2} (47.3 sq mi)
- Elevation: 3,467 m (11,375 ft)

Population (2005 census)
  - Total: 9,989
  - Density: 81.61/km^{2} (211.4/sq mi)
- Time zone: UTC-5 (PET)
- UBIGEO: 120402

Acolla District is one of thirty-four districts of the province Jauja in Peru.
