= Tipiqucha (Junín) =

Lake in Junín, Peru

- Location within Peru
- Location: Peru; Junín Region
- Coordinates: 11°44′42″S 75°13′13″W

Tipiqucha (Quechua tipi Pennisetum clandestinum (a grass species), qucha lake, hispanicized spelling Tipicocha) is a lake in the Junín Region in Peru. It located in the Jauja Province, Apata District, near a populated place of that name.

== See also ==
- List of lakes in Peru
