= Muntirayuq (Junín) =

Mountain in the Andes of Peru

- Location within Peru

Highest point
- Elevation: 4,600 m (15,100 ft)
- Coordinates: 11°44′08″S 75°18′25″W

Geography
- Location: Peru, Junín Region
- Parent range: Andes

Muntirayuq (Quechua muntira an ancient cloth cap; a bullfighter's hat, -yuq a suffix, 'the one with a cap', also spelled Monterrayoc) is a mountain in the Andes of Peru which reaches a height of approximately 4,600 metres (15,092 ft). It is located in the Junín Region, Jauja Province, Apata District.
