= Muruqucha (Jauja) =

Mountain in Peru

- Location within Peru

Highest point
- Elevation: 4,800 m (15,700 ft)
- Coordinates: 11°41′59″S 75°15′00″W

Geography
- Location: Peru, Junín Region
- Parent range: Andes

Muruqucha (Quechua muru blunt; mutilated; stained; pip, grain; smallpox, qucha lake, also spelled Morococha) is a mountain in the Andes of Peru which reaches a height of approximately 4,800 metres (15,748 ft). It is located in the Junín Region, Jauja Province, Apata District.
