= Jauja province =

Coordinates: 11.7750°S 75.5000°W

Jauja
- Province
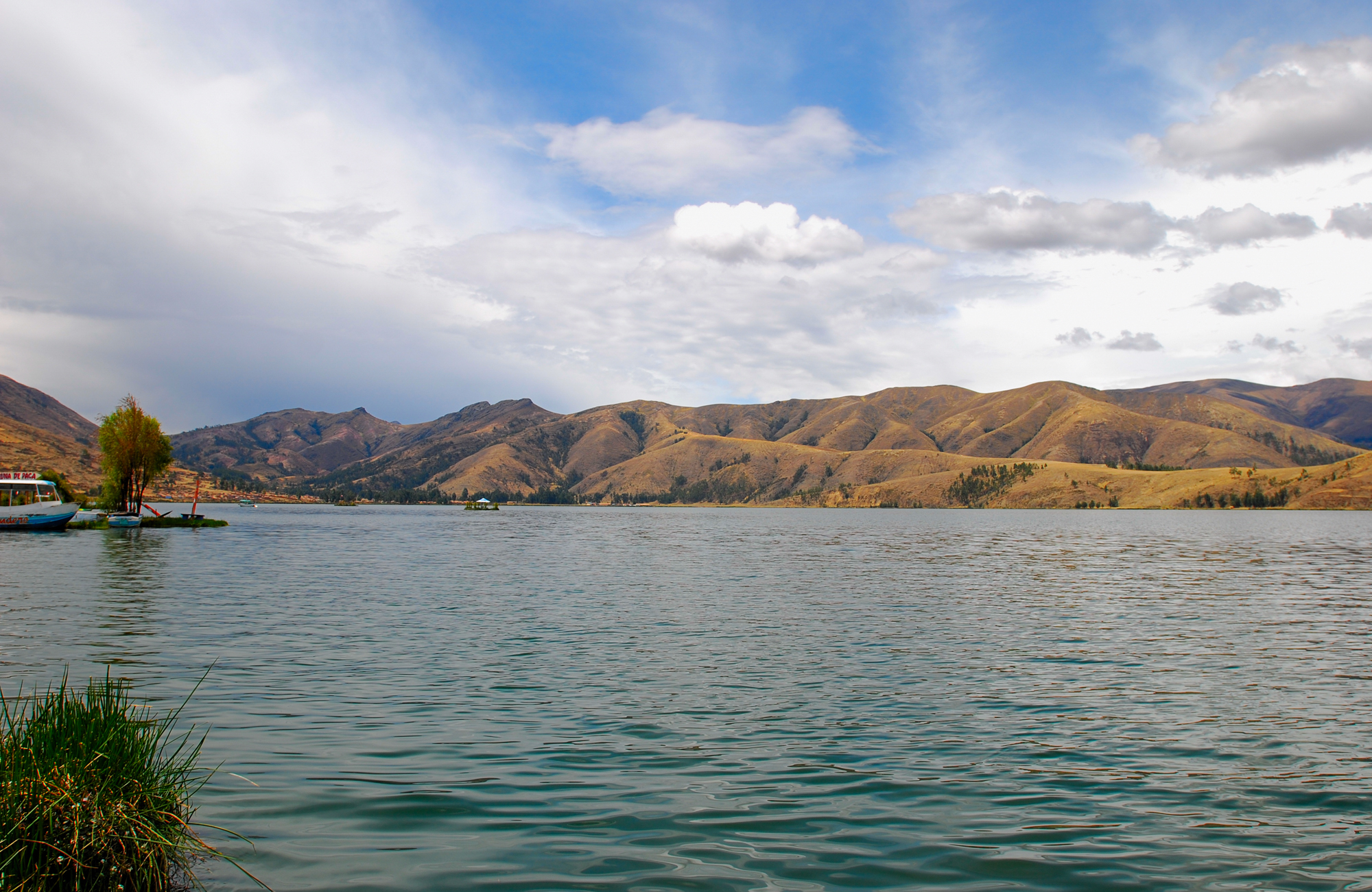
- Laguna de Paca in the Jauja Province

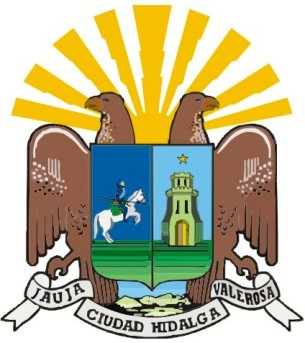
- Coat of arms

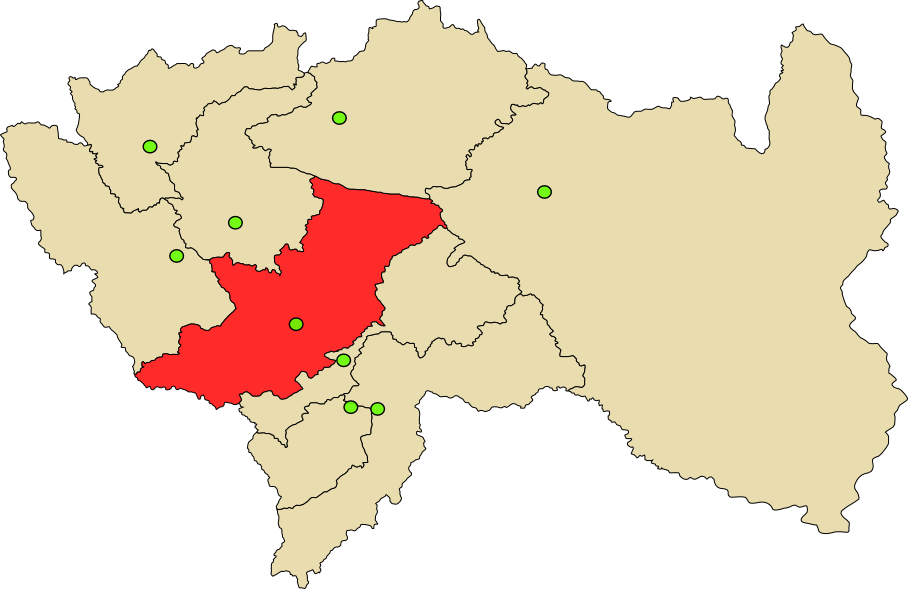
- Location of Jauja in the Junín Region
- Country: Peru
- Region: Junín
- Founded: October 1533
- Capital: Jauja

Government
  - Mayor: Cesar Davila Veliz (2019–2022)

Area
  - Total: 3,749 km^{2} (1,447 sq mi)
- Elevation: 3,336 m (10,945 ft)

Population
  - Total: 83,257
  - Density: 22.21/km^{2} (57.52/sq mi)
- UBIGEO: 1204
- Website: www.munijauja.gob.pe

Jauja is a Peruvian province. It is one of the nine provinces of the Junín Region. To the north it borders with the provinces of Yauli, Tarma and Chanchamayo. To the east with the province of Satipo, to the south with the province of Concepción and to the west with the Lima Region. The capital of the province is the city of Jauja (Quechua: Shausha or Sausa). The city was founded by Francisco Pizarro as the first capital of Peru.

Before the arrival of the Spaniards the province was called Hatun Xauxa (Quechua spelling variants: Hatun Shawsha or Hatun Sausa) and it was the main center of the nation Hatunwanka Xauxa, that consisted of Tawantinsuyu after the expansion of Pachakutiq Inca.

== Geography ==
The province lies in the Nor Yauyos-Cochas Landscape Reserve. The Paryaqaqa mountain range traverses the province. One of the highest mountains of the province is Paryaqaqa (Tulluqutu) at 5,750 metres (18,865 ft). Other mountain are listed below:

- Antaqucha
- Antikuna
- Chaka Marka
- Challwaqucha
- Chawpiqucha
- Ch'uychu
- Kima Rumi
- Kuntur Sinqa
- Kushuru Q'asa
- K'ulluq
- Marayniyuq
- Marayrasu
- Marayrasu (Apata)
- Mata Mach'ay
- Mayu Kancha
- Muntirayuq
- Muntirayuq (Pomacancha)
- Muruqucha
- Muyupampa
- Pichana
- Puywan
- Phiruruyuq
- Qiwllaqucha
- Qullqa Tampu
- Qullqi P'ukru
- Qura Kancha
- Quriwasi
- Qutu Pukyu
- Suyruqucha (Junín)
- Suyruqucha (Junín-Lima)
- Tunshu
- Tuku Mach'ay (Apata)
- Tuku Mach'ay (Canchayllo)
- Tunki
- T'uru Qurin
- T'uruqucha
- Uqsha Mach'ay
- Utkhulasu
- Waqraqucha
- Waqutuyuq
- Wayta Pallana
- Wira Qullpa
- Wiraqucha
- Yana Uqsha
- Yanaqa
- Yuraq Kancha

Some of the largest lakes of the province are Antaqucha, Asulqucha, Challwaqucha, Llaksaqucha, Mankhaqucha, Pumaqucha, Qarwaqucha, Ñawinqucha, Warmiqucha, Wich'iqucha and Yuraqqucha.

== Political division ==
The province of Jauja is divided into 34 districts:

- Acolla (Acolla)
- Apata (Apata)
- Ataura (Ataura)
- Canchayllo (Canchayllo)
- Curicaca (El Rosario)
- El Mantaro (Pucucho)
- Huamalí (Huamalí)
- Huaripampa (Huaripampa)
- Huertas (Huertas)
- Janjaillo (Janjaillo)
- Jauja (Jauja)
- Julcán (Julcán)
- Leonor Ordóñez (Huancani)
- Llocllapampa (Llocllapampa)
- Marco (Marco)
- Masma (Masma)
- Masma Chicche (Masma Chicche)
- Molinos (Molinos)
- Monobamba (Monobamba)
- Muqui (Muqui)
- Muquiyauyo (Muquiyauyo)
- Paca (Paca)
- Paccha (Paccha)
- Pancán (Pancán)
- Parco (Parco)
- Pomacancha (Pomacancha)
- Ricran (Ricran)
- San Lorenzo (San Lorenzo)
- San Pedro de Chunan (San Pedro de Chunan)
- Sausa (Sausa)
- Sincos (Sincos)
- Tunan Marca (Concho)
- Yauli (Yauli)
- Yauyos (Yauyos)

== See also ==
- Quri Winchus
- Tipiqucha
- Tunanmarka
- Waqlamarka
