= Pancán District =

Coordinates: 11.7468°S 75.4948°W

Pancán Pankan
- District
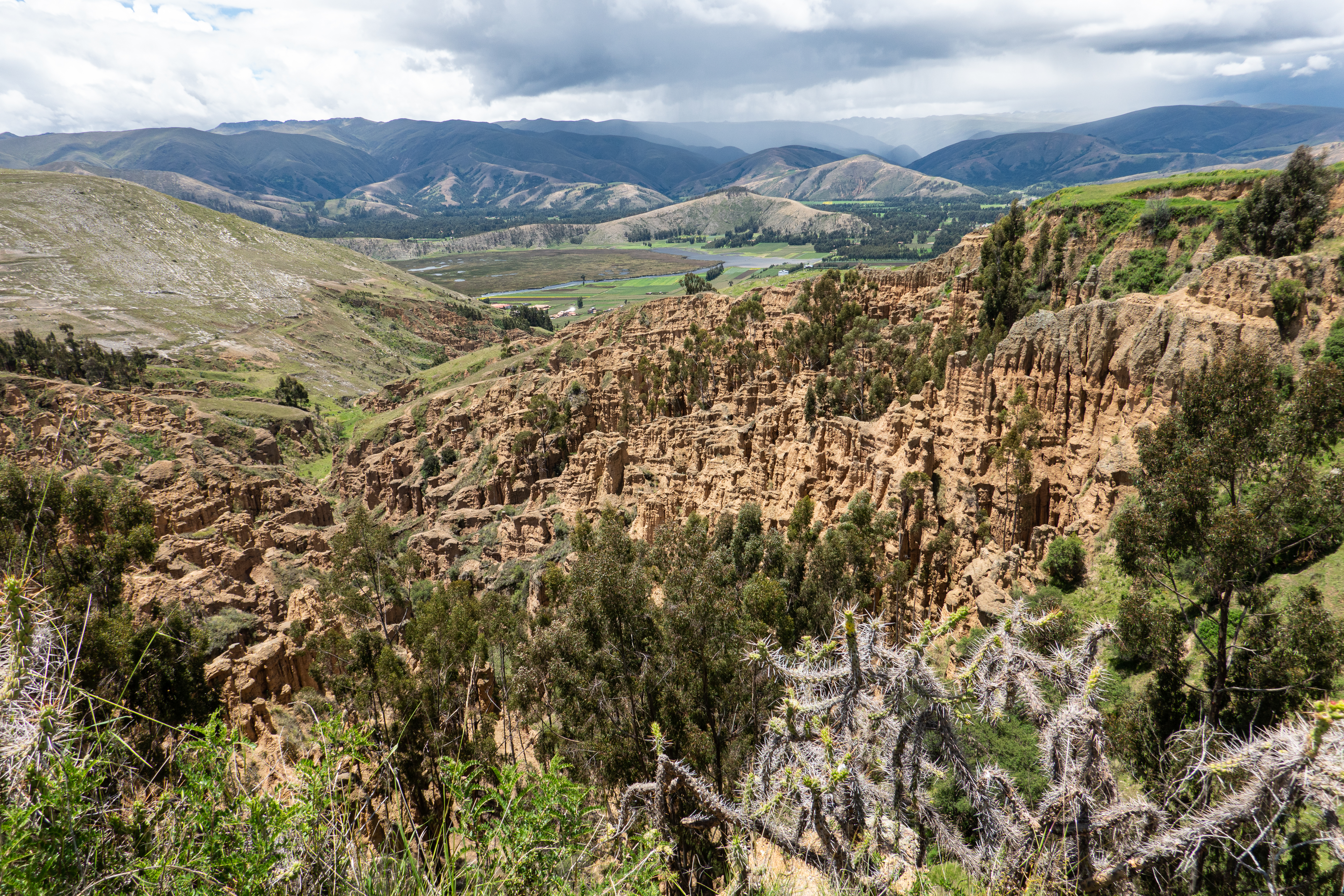
- Interactive map of Pancán
- Country: Peru
- Region: Junín
- Province: Jauja
- Founded: January 26, 1956
- Capital: Pancán

Government
  - Mayor: Zoilo Diogenes Bullon Mejico

Area
  - Total: 10.89 km^{2} (4.20 sq mi)
- Elevation: 3,400 m (11,200 ft)

Population (2005 census)
  - Total: 1,647
  - Density: 151.2/km^{2} (391.7/sq mi)
- Time zone: UTC-5 (PET)
- UBIGEO: 120424

Pancán District is one of thirty-four districts of the province Jauja in Peru.

== Archaeological Sites ==
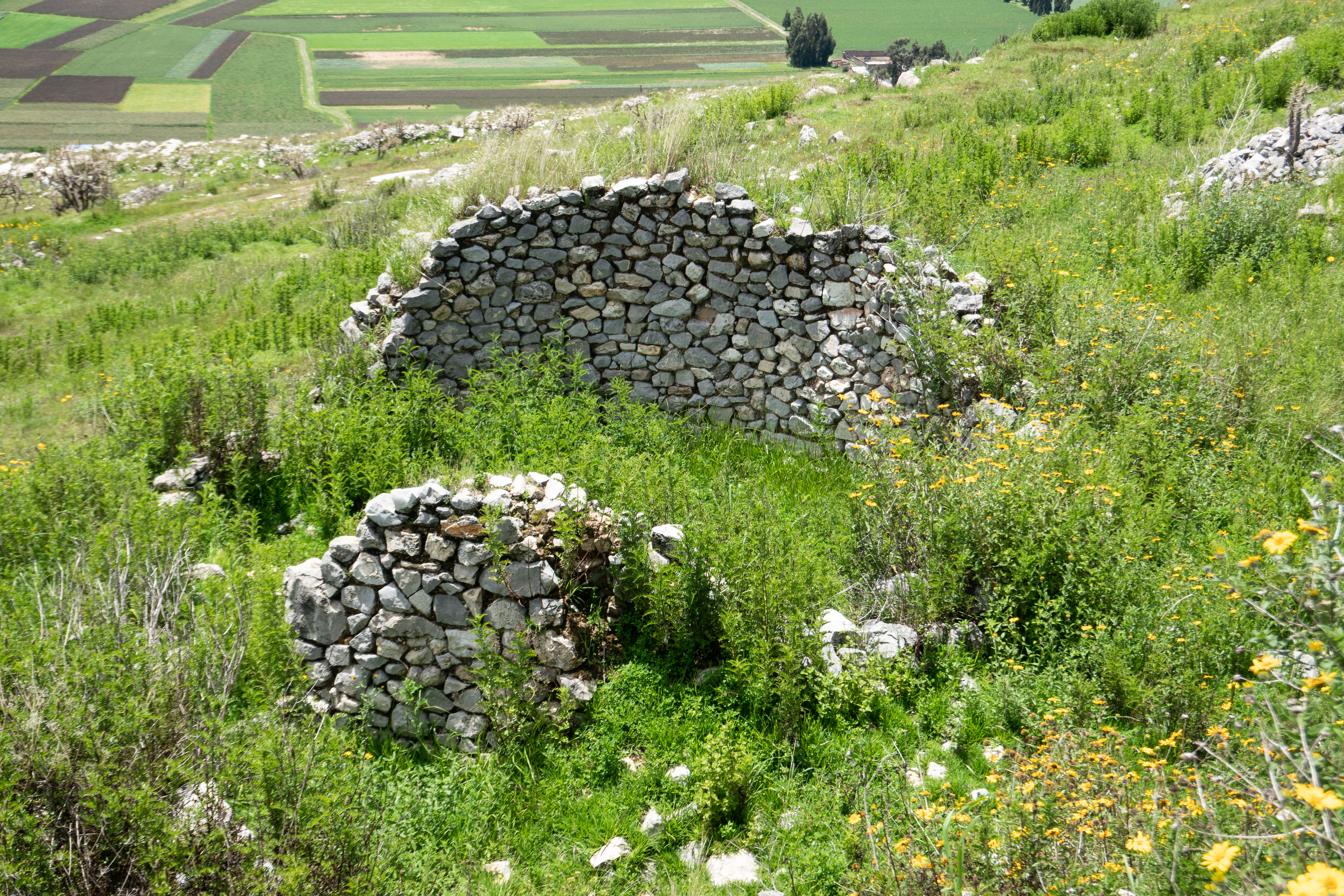
Pueblo Viejo

On the side of a hill in the south-west corder of the district lies the small site Pueblo Viejo. Initially occupied at the beginning of the Late Intermediate Period during the rule of the Huarpas. Now somewhat overgrown and unmaintained, walls of some buildings remain.

== Geology ==
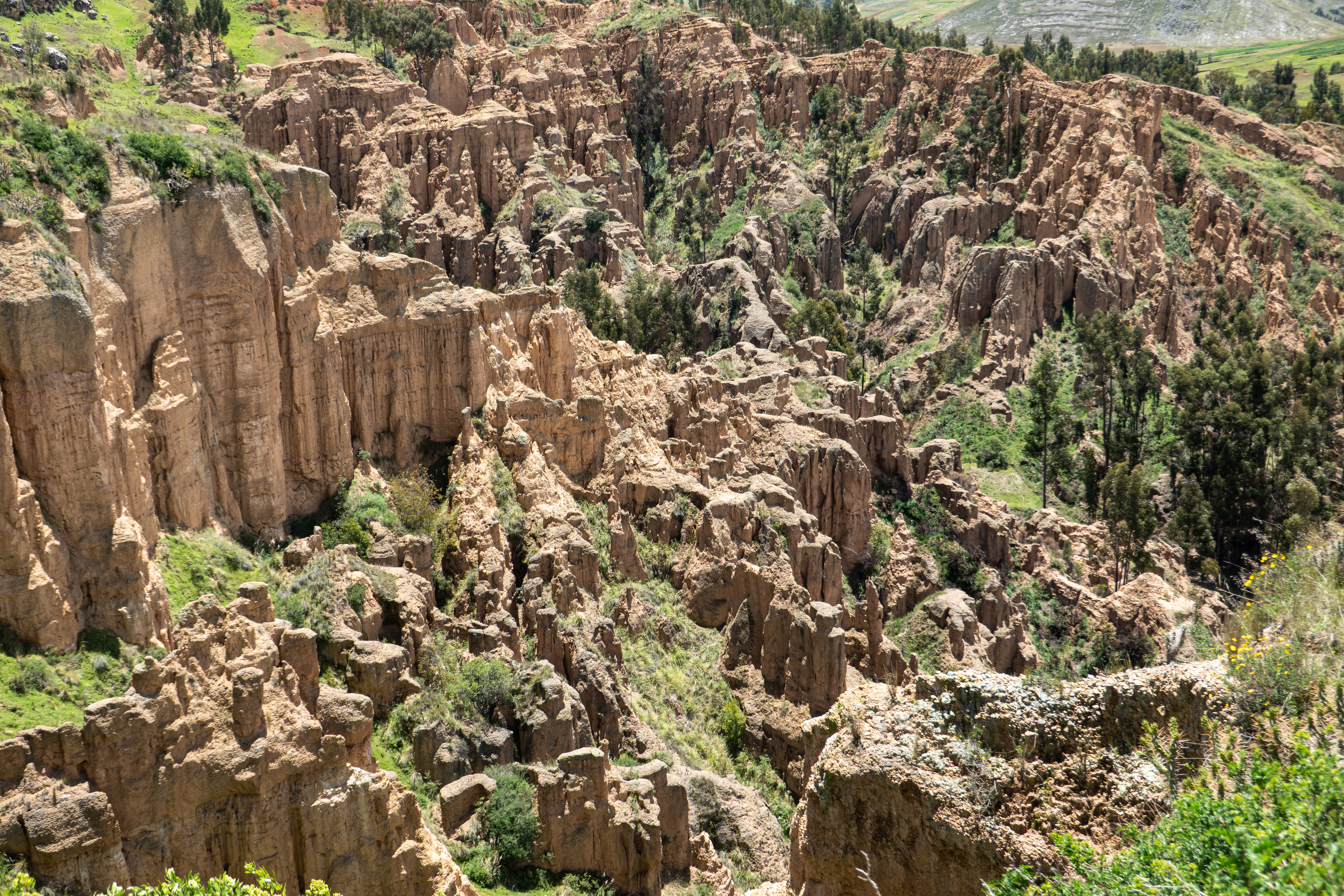
Cañoncitos de Pichiluli

To the south west of the district is an area of dramatic valley erosion, the Cañoncitos de Pichiluli.
