= Marayrazo =

Mountain in Peru

- Location within Peru

Highest point
- Elevation: 4,800 m (15,700 ft)
- Coordinates: 11°41′37″S 75°14′20″W

Geography
- Location: Peru, Junín Region
- Parent range: Andes

Marayrazo (possibly from Quechua maray batan or grindstone; to tear down, to knock down, rasu snow, ice) is a mountain in the Andes of Peru which reaches a height of approximately 4,800 metres (15,748 ft). It is located in the Junín Region, Jauja Province, Apata District.
