= Muntirayuq (Pomacancha) =

Mountain in Peru

- Location within Peru

Highest point
- Elevation: 4,200 m (13,800 ft)
- Coordinates: 11°37′57″S 75°38′17″W

Geography
- Location: Peru, Junín Region
- Parent range: Andes, Cordillera Central

Muntirayuq (Quechua muntira an ancient cloth cap; a bullfighter's hat, -yuq a suffix, 'the one with a cap', also spelled Monterayoc) is a mountain in the Cordillera Central in the Andes of Peru which reaches a height of approximately 4,200 metres (13,780 ft). It is located in the Junín Region, Jauja Province, Pomacancha District.
