= Lake Pumacocha (Jauja) =

Lake in Junín, Peru

- Lake Pomacocha
- Location within Peru
- Location: Peru; Junín Region
- Coordinates: 11°46′48″S 75°14′46.5″W

Lake Pumacocha or Lake Pomacocha (both possibly from Quechua puma cougar, puma, qucha lake) is a lake in Peru located in Jauja Province, Junín. It is located near the boundary between the provinces of Jauja and Concepción.

== See also ==
- List of lakes in Peru
