= Utkhulasu =

Mountain in Peru

- Location within Peru

Highest point
- Elevation: 5,000 m (16,000 ft)
- Coordinates: 11°41′21″S 75°12′38″W

Geography
- Location: Peru, Junín Region
- Parent range: Andes

Utkhulasu (Quechua utkhu cotton, local Quechua lasu (rasu) snow, ice, mountain with snow, also spelled Utculazo) is a mountain in the Andes of Peru which reaches a height of approximately 5,000 metres (16,404 ft). It is located in the Junín Region, in the Concepción Province, Cochas District, and in the Jauja Province, Apata District.
