= Gran Pajonal =

Peruvian plateau

- Location within Peru

Geography
- Location: Ucayali Department, Pasco Department, Junín Department, Peru
- Range coordinates: 10°45′14″S 74°13′12″W

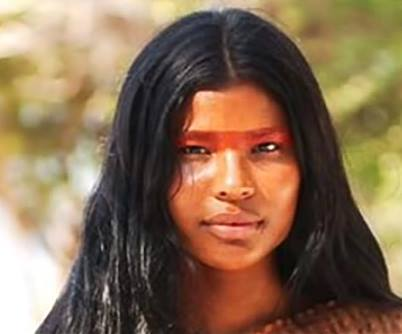
An Asháninka woman.

The Gran Pajonal (Great Scrubland or Great Savanna) is an isolated interfluvial plateau in the Amazon Basin of Peru. It is located in the departments of Ucayali, Pasco and Junín. The plateau is inhabited by the Asháninka or Ashéninka people along with late-twentieth century immigrants largely from the Andes mountains of Peru. In the 1730s, Roman Catholic Franciscan missionaries established missions in the Gran Pajonal, but the missions were destroyed in the 1740s by the Ashaninka under the leadership of Juan Santos Atahualpa.

Beginning again in 1897, missionaries, collectors of rubber, settlers, and the government of Peru began to encroach on the Gran Pajonal. In the 1980s, the Asháninka achieved a measure of security when most of the land of the Gran Pajonal was deeded to 36 communities. The population of the Gran Pajonal in 2002 was estimated at 7,000, of which 90 percent were Asháninka.

== Description ==
The plateau area of the Gran Pajonal as defined by different scholars is between 2,000 square kilometres (770 sq mi) to 4,000 square kilometres (1,500 sq mi). The term Gran Pajonal is often applied loosely to a much larger area. The Gran Pajonal has elevations ranging from about 900 metres (3,000 ft) to 1,400 metres (4,600 ft) and is incised by the headwaters of several small rivers.

The Gran Pajonal was named by the Spanish because, in a region of tropical rain forest, it features patches of small grasslands amounting to about 4 percent of its total area. The Pajonal has no definite boundaries, but lies east of the Cerro de la Sal (Salt Mountain) area and is an outlier of the Andes. It rises above the Palcazu River on the west and the Ucayali River on the east and is bordered on the south by the Perene and Tambo rivers. The El Sira Communal Reserve and mountains border the Pajonal on the north. The Cerro de la Sal mountain range outlines its southern boundary. Mountains around the edge of the plateau have elevations of more than 1,800 metres (5,900 ft).

The elevation of the Gran Pajonal results in lower average temperatures than the Amazon lowlands. Average temperatures on the plateau range from 21 °C (70 °F) to 23 °C (73 °F). Annual precipitation is more than 2,100 millimetres (83 in) with a three-month dry period (June to August). The natural vegetation is tropical rain forest except for the anthropogenic grasslands, totaling about 9,700 hectares (24,000 acres) and deriving from hundreds or thousands of years of cultivation by the indigenous people. In 2004 another 3,500 hectares (8,600 acres) of grasslands used as pasture had been created since 1975 by immigrants to the area, mostly farmers from the Andes.

== History ==
The indigenous people inhabiting the Gran Pajonal at the time of its discovery by the Spanish were called Campa, Anti, or Chuncho by the Spaniards and are known to scholars and themselves as Asháninka, a widespread people of the Amazon Basin of Peru and neighboring Brazil. The Asháninka of the Gran Pajonal are sometimes called Ashéninka as their language is distinct from other divisions of the ethnic group. Like most peoples of the Amazon rainforest, they practiced slash-and-burn agriculture. Their principle crop was manioc (yuka), but they also cultivated bananas, peanuts, beans, and many other useful plants. The Asháninka farmer might grow as many as 50 different plants on his farm.

The Gran Pajonal was difficult of access due to its elevation and lack of navigable rivers. The first Spaniard to visit was Juan Bautista de la Marca, a Franciscan missionary, in 1733. The area was immediately attractive to both missionaries and settlers due to its relatively dense population of indigenous people and more salubrious climate than the Amazon lowlands. In 1735, an armed expedition including three Franciscans began missionary work and by 1739 the Franciscans were working in 10 villages. Following the common Spanish strategy of reductions, the Franciscans began to force the indigenous people to live in communities adjacent to the missions rather than dispersed in small groups as was their custom. The rebellion of Juan Santos Atahualpa, beginning in 1742, destroyed the missionary enterprise and left the Gran Pajonal in Asháninka control for 150 years although they suffered from periodic epidemics of European diseases and in the late 19th century from slave raids by businesses engaged in the gathering of rubber.

In 1896 and 1897, a Franciscan priest, Gabriel Sala, visited the Grand Pajonal along with a group of armed men. In the wake of his expedition, various plans to build roads, railroads, and establish Catholic missions in the Pajonal came to nothing until 1935 when three missions were established and in 1938 an airstrip was built in Oventeni, the largest of the mission communities. In 1965, the Peruvian army defeated a guerrilla organization, the Left Revolutionary Movement in a battle in the Pajonal and the army remained in Oventeni for 3 years. The missions were closed.

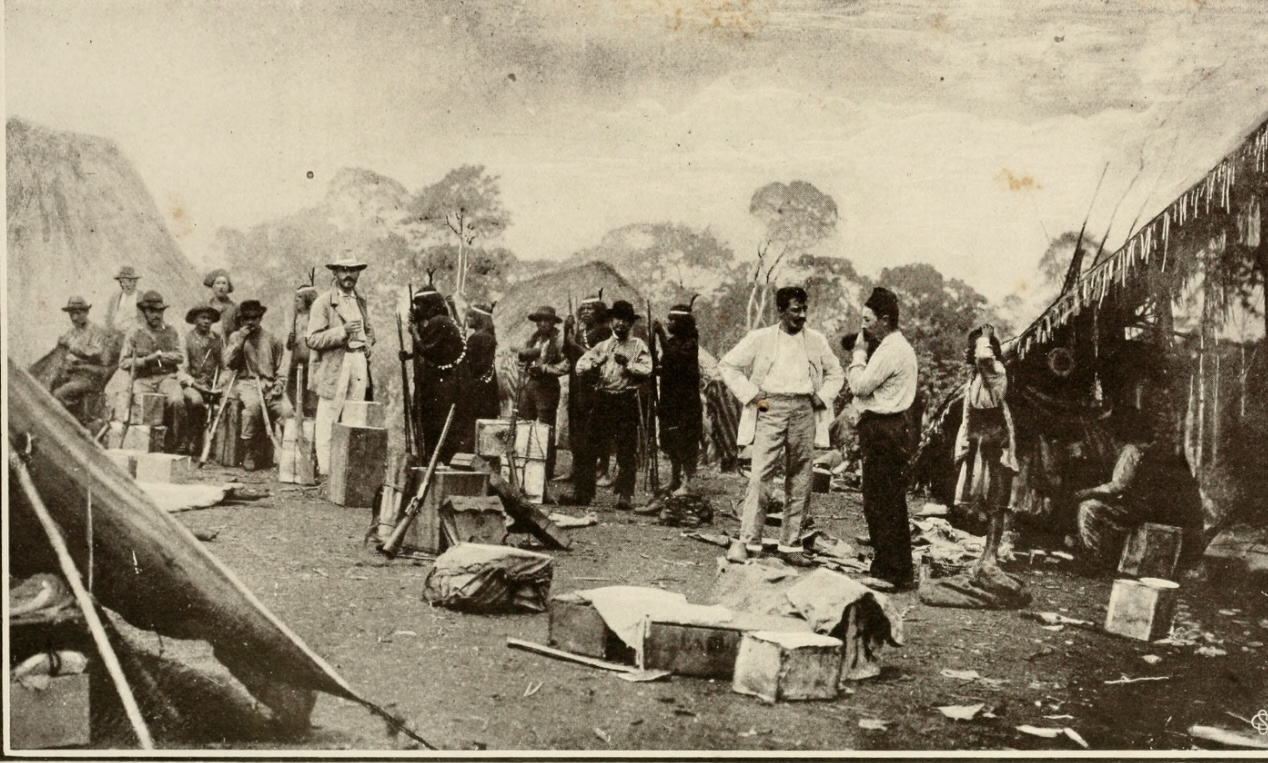
“Campamento á una jornada del Gran Pajonal”

In 1965, another religious organization, the Wycliffe Translators began work in the Pajonal and the majority of the missionaries became Protestants rather than Roman Catholics. The Protestant presence coincided with the growing consciousness of the Asháninka that they must organize to meet the challenges facing them from outsiders. In the 1980s, with assistance from the World Bank and Denmark, the Asháninka achieved legal title to land belonging to 36 communities in the Gran Pajonal. Non-Asháninka, mostly people of Andean origin, were allowed to reside and own land only in the community of Oventeni. Some of the Asháninka worked as cattle herders or coffee harvesters for the outsiders; others practiced traditional agriculture on the lands within their communities.

== Administration and population ==
The Gran Pajonal laps over the borders of three Departments: Raimondi District in the Atalaya Province of Ucayali Department; Puerto Bermúdez District in the Oxapampa Province of Pasco Department; and a small part of Rio Tambo District of Satipo Province in Junín Department.

At the center of the Gran Pajonal is the community of Oventeni, elevation 1,003 metres (3,291 ft) surrounded in every direction by the patches of grassland which gave the Gran Pajonal its name. The 36 communities of Asháninka had a population of about 6,500 in 2002 and the non-Asháninka numbered about 650.
