= Ciudad Constitución Airport (Peru) =

Airport in Peru

- IATA: none; ICAO: SPCC

Summary
- Airport type: Public
- Serves: Ciudad Constitución
- Elevation AMSL: 775 ft / 236 m
- Coordinates: 9°51′50″S 75°00′25″W

Map
- Location of the airport in Peru

Runways
Direction	Length		Surface
Direction	m	ft	Surface
06/24	980	3,215	Grass
- Source: GCM Google Maps

Ciudad Constitución Airport (ICAO: SPCC) is an airport serving the Palcazu River town of Ciudad Constitución in the Pasco Region of Peru. The runway is 1.5 kilometres (0.9 mi) southeast of the town.

== See also ==
- Transport in Peru
- List of airports in Peru
