= Constitución District =

Coordinates: 9.8549°S 75.0213°W

Constitución District Distrito de Constitución
- District
- Interactive map of Constitución District
- Country: Peru
- Region: Pasco
- Province: Oxapampa
- Founded: 14 June 2010

Government
  - Mayor: Moisés Acuña Gómez
- Time zone: UTC-5 (PET)
- UBIGEO: 190308
- Website: municonstitucion.gob.pe

Constitución District is one of eight districts of the province Oxapampa in Peru. Its capital is the town of Ciudad Constitucion.
