= Villa Rica District =

Villa Rica
- District
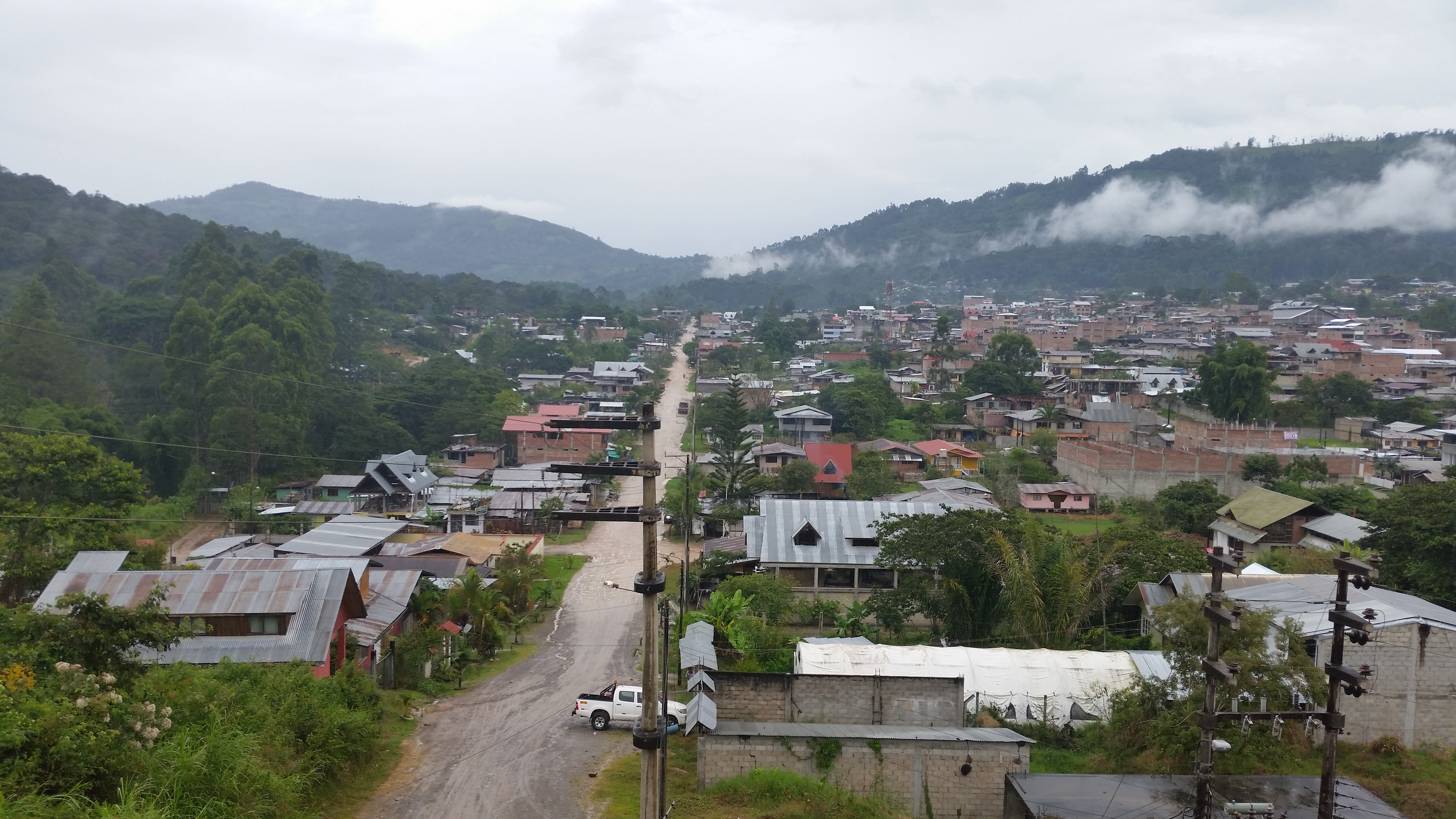
- The town of Villa Rica
- Interactive map of Villa Rica
- Country: Peru
- Region: Pasco
- Province: Oxapampa
- Founded: November 27, 1944
- Capital: Villa Rica

Government
  - Mayor: Juan Carlos La Torre Moscoso

Area
  - Total: 896.42 km^{2} (346.11 sq mi)
- Elevation: 1,466 m (4,810 ft)

Population (2017 Census)
  - Total: 18,763
  - Density: 20.931/km^{2} (54.211/sq mi)
- Time zone: UTC-5 (PET)
- UBIGEO: 190307

Villa Rica District is one of eight districts of Oxapampa Province in Pasco Department, Peru. The district has an area of 896 square kilometres (346 sq mi) and a population of 18,673 in 2017. The capital of the district is the town of Villa Rica which had a population of 11,900 in 2017. The district is the location of the Cerro de la Sal or Salt Mountain, an important gathering place for indigenous people of the region and a center of Franciscan missionary activity in the 17th and 18th centuries. The town was founded in 1928 by settlers of German and Austrian origin from the town of Pozuzo.

The District of Villa Rica is on the eastern slopes of the Andes mountains in an area of abundant rainfall and mild temperatures. It is located in the ecological zone of the Peruvian Yungas, or Ceja de Selva ("eyebrow of the jungle"), the transition zone between the low jungles of the Amazon Basin and the Andes highlands. Elevations in the district range from about 800 metres (2,600 ft) to about 2,400 metres (7,900 ft). Where not cleared for agriculture, the vegetation is tropical and sub-tropical forests.

== Cerro de la Sal ==
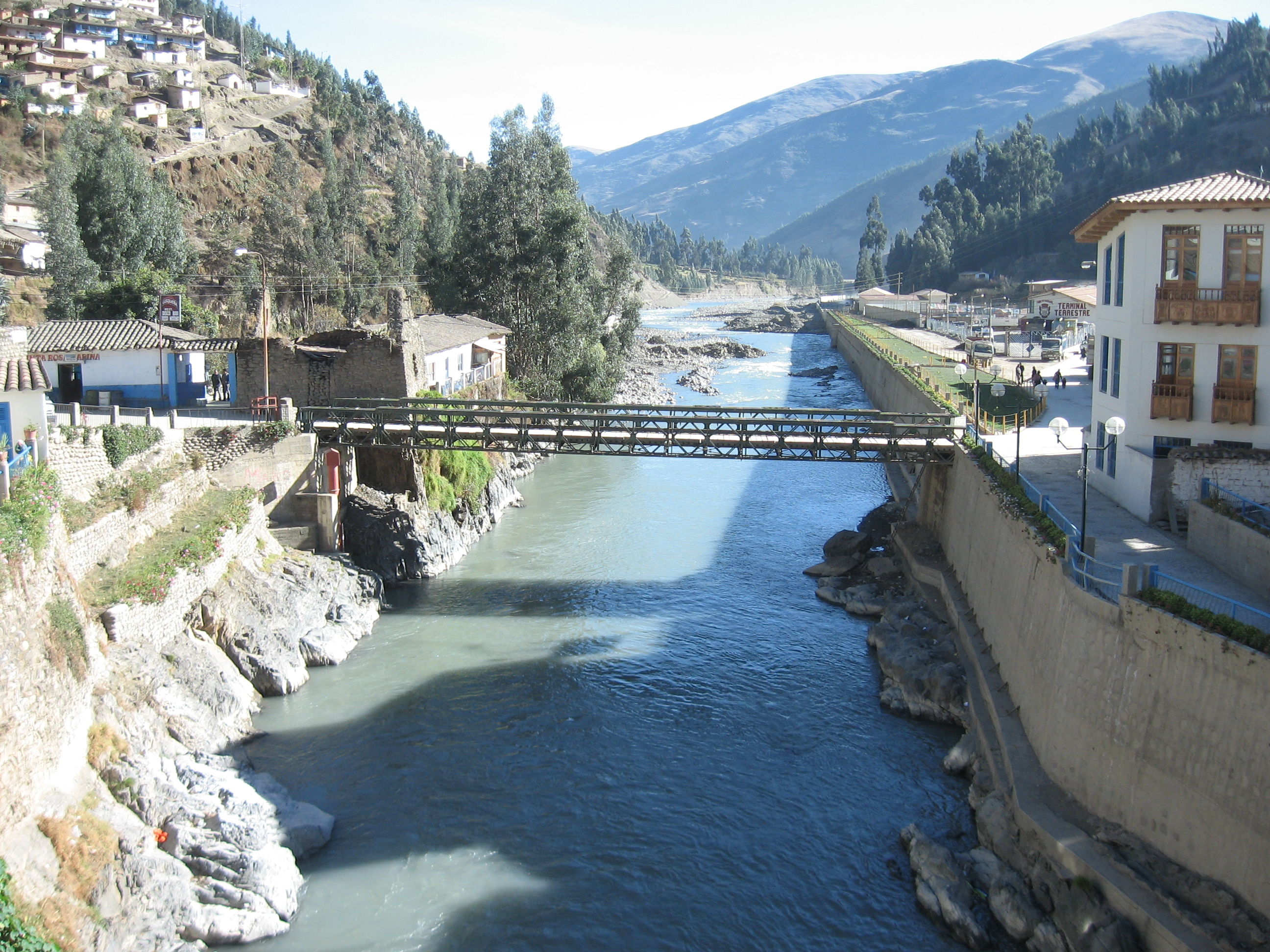
The Paucartambo River is the southern border of Villa Rica District.

The Cerro de la Sal (Mountain of Salt) is located about 7 kilometres (4.3 miles) north of the town of Villa Rica at 10.683°S 75.267°W. In pre-Columbian and colonial Peru the indigenous people exploited the salt and transported it downriver by raft to a large number of peoples in the Amazon Basin. The Cerro de la Sal was in the territory of the Asháninka and was also a source of salt for the Amuesha and other peoples in the Amazon Basin.

The Spanish realized the strategic importance of the Cerro de la Sal early in the 17th century. Roman Catholic Franciscan missionaries were attracted to the Cerro de la Sal because of the seasonal congregation of large numbers of indigenous people there. A large number of Christian missions collectively called the Cerro de la Sal missions were established in the region. In 1742, a messianic movement headed by Juan Santos Atahualpa emptied the missions and the Spanish were expelled from Cerro de la Sal for more than 100 years. In the late 19th and early 20th century settlers of European and Andean origin dispossessed the indigenous people.

== Climate ==
Villa Rica has a Af (tropical, humid, no pronounced dry season) climate under the Köppen Classification system. However, the climate borders on Aw (tropical savannah with a dry season) and Cfb (subtropical mountain climate, "eternal spring.") Measured by the Trewartha climate classification system the climate is Arbb (tropical rainforest with warm summers and winters). Villa Rica's climate is modified by its altitude which results in lower average temperatures year than low-elevation tropics. The monthly deviation in average temperatures between the hottest and coldest months is only 1.8 degrees C (3 degrees F). The austral winter months of June and July are fairly dry, but precipitation is abundant during the remainder of the year.

Climate data for Villa Rica, Villa Rica District 1,466 metres (4,810 ft) above sea level
Month	Jan	Feb	Mar	Apr	May	Jun	Jul	Aug	Sep	Oct	Nov	Dec	Year
Mean daily maximum °C (°F)	26.0 (78.8)	25.2 (77.4)	25.0 (77.0)	26.1 (79.0)	26.4 (79.5)	26.2 (79.2)	25.9 (78.6)	26.5 (79.7)	26.8 (80.2)	26.5 (79.7)	26.6 (79.9)	25.6 (78.1)	26.1 (79.0)
Daily mean °C (°F)	20.0 (68.0)	19.5 (67.1)	19.1 (66.4)	19.6 (67.3)	19.1 (66.4)	18.5 (65.3)	18.2 (64.8)	18.8 (65.8)	19.5 (67.1)	19.8 (67.6)	19.9 (67.8)	19.3 (66.7)	19.3 (66.7)
Mean daily minimum °C (°F)	14.0 (57.2)	13.8 (56.8)	13.2 (55.8)	13.1 (55.6)	11.8 (53.2)	10.9 (51.6)	10.6 (51.1)	11.1 (52.0)	12.2 (54.0)	13.1 (55.6)	13.3 (55.9)	13.0 (55.4)	12.5 (54.5)
Average precipitation mm (inches)	272 (10.7)	258 (10.2)	246 (9.7)	162 (6.4)	106 (4.2)	62 (2.4)	61 (2.4)	80 (3.1)	125 (4.9)	175 (6.9)	176 (6.9)	255 (10.0)	1,978 (77.9)
Source: Climate-data-org

== Places of interest ==
- Yanachaga–Chemillén National Park
