= Mail Malpartida Achón =

Peruvian serial killer

- Born: 1974 (age 51–52); Peru
- Other names: "The Cutthroat of Oxapampa" "The Butcher of Oxapampa"
- Convictions: Murder x 10; Kidnapping; Extortion; Possession of illegal weapons Terrorism
- Penalty: Life imprisonment

Details
- Victims: 10–21
- Span of crimes: 2006–2007
- Country: Peru
- States: Huánuco, Oxapampa
- Date apprehended: December 27, 2007

Mail Malpartida Achón (born 1974), known as The Cutthroat of Oxapampa (Spanish: El Degollador de Oxapampa), is a Peruvian serial killer, kidnapper and ex-MRTA terrorist who murdered at least ten people in the Oxapampa area from 2006 to 2007, sometimes with accomplices. Convicted and sentenced to life imprisonment for his confirmed crimes, Malpartida later confessed responsibility for a total of twenty-one murders, which as of 2024 have not been proven.

== Early life ==
Little is known about Malpartida's early life. Born in 1974, he joined the MRTA sometimes in the 1990s, receiving military and firearms training in order to carry out actions against the government. After the organization was disbanded, Malpartida escaped into the jungles surrounding Oxapampa to avoid arrest.

== Murders ==
In June 2006, Malpartida murdered 23-year-old mining businessman Lenin Francisco Balerio Alcántara by shooting him in the back and then robbing him of 280 grams of gold he had obtained from a gold mine in Huánuco. After the murder, he extracted the man's organs so that the corpse could weigh less, and then forced the victim's cousin to throw the body into the river. He was quickly caught by the police and imprisoned in the local prison in Oxapampa. On December 16, Malpartida, together with Isaías Ángeles Tambino and Marcelino Tolentino Guerra, killed the non-commissioned PNP officer Humberto Vásquez Pérez and inmate Guzmán Canerioqui Porras, after which they fled prison. Before doing so, the trio stole two AKM rifles, three pistols, a grenade and a commando-style uniform, injuring another non-commissioned officer, Cristóbal Choque Flores, in the process.

After escaping from prison, Malpartida kidnapped businessman Roberto Shuller Shaus and his daughter, demanding 50,000 dollars in exchange for their release, which he did after he was paid 10,000 soles. On October 18, 2007, Malpartida kidnapped 55-year-old farmer Liboria Rivera Carhuaricra and demanded a large sum of money for her release, but instead slit her throat after noticing that officers were hiding in the area. Before fleeing, he cut out her tongue so "her soul would not give him away". It was alleged that in the time period after his escape from prison, he was involved in the murders of at least seven people and the extortion of more than ten cattle ranchers, with him apparently cutting up his victims with knives for pleasure.

On December 27, Malpartida, aided by his brother Enías, kidnapped 45-year-old timber businesswoman Griselda Curi Huayta and demanded a payment of $20,000. The first part of the payment was made, and Curi was released. The second part of the payment was agreed to be delivered in Cueva Blanca in the Junín Department. However, before he could receive it, he was cornered by police and caught as part of "Operation Hunt 2008". After a nine-hour chase, Malpartida was captured and found in possession of a grenade, portable radios, binoculars, ski masks and military clothing.

== Trial and sentence ==
In 2009, Malpartida was convicted on multiple counts of murder, extortion, kidnapping and possession of illegal weaponry, for which he and Tolentino were sentenced to life imprisonment. During the trial, he claimed to the judge that he was involved in twenty one murders in total. In September of that year, Malpartida was involved in the deposit of a sum of 369 soles in the account of Norma Beatriz Bustamante Yauri, then staff at the Huancayo Prison, by some alleged relatives, an action that led to disciplinary repercussions against Bustamante.

== See also ==
- List of serial killers by country
