= Ciudad Constitución, Peru =

Settlement in Peru

Coordinates: 9°51′S 75°1′W

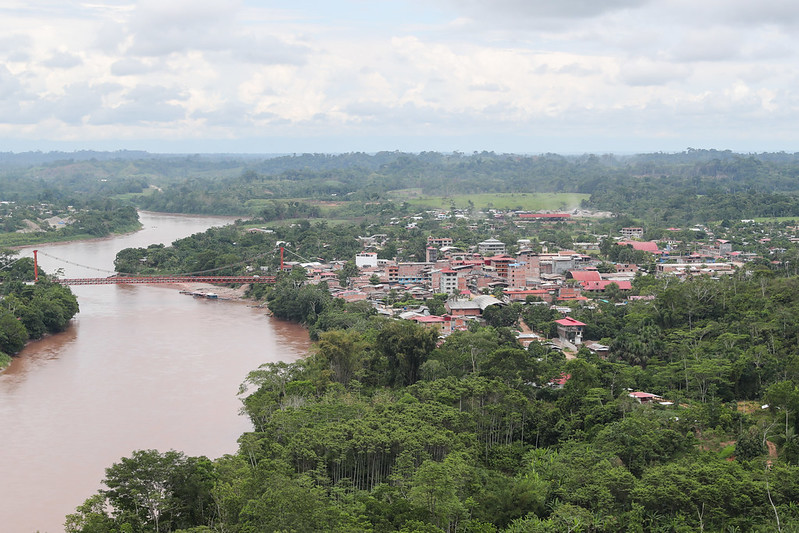
View from the west

Ciudad Constitución is a town in Oxapampa Province, Pasco Region, Peru. It is the capital of the homonymous district. The town is in the Amazon basin and straddles the Palcazu River.

It is served by Ciudad Constitución Airport
