= Oxapampa District =

Coordinates: 10.574°S 75.405°W

Oxapampa Uqshapampa
- District
- Interactive map of Oxapampa
- Country: Peru
- Region: Pasco
- Province: Oxapampa
- Founded: May 14, 1876
- Capital: Oxapampa

Government
  - Mayor: Juan Carlos La Torre Moscoso

Area
  - Total: 982.04 km^{2} (379.17 sq mi)
- Elevation: 1,814 m (5,951 ft)

Population (2017)
  - Total: 16,565
  - Density: 16.868/km^{2} (43.688/sq mi)
- Time zone: UTC-5 (PET)
- UBIGEO: 190301

Historical population
Year	Pop.	±%
1993	12,826	—
2007	14,190	+10.6%
2017	16,565	+16.7%
2020 (est)	17,255	+4.2%
Source: Source: Instituto Nacional de Estadística e Informática, Peru

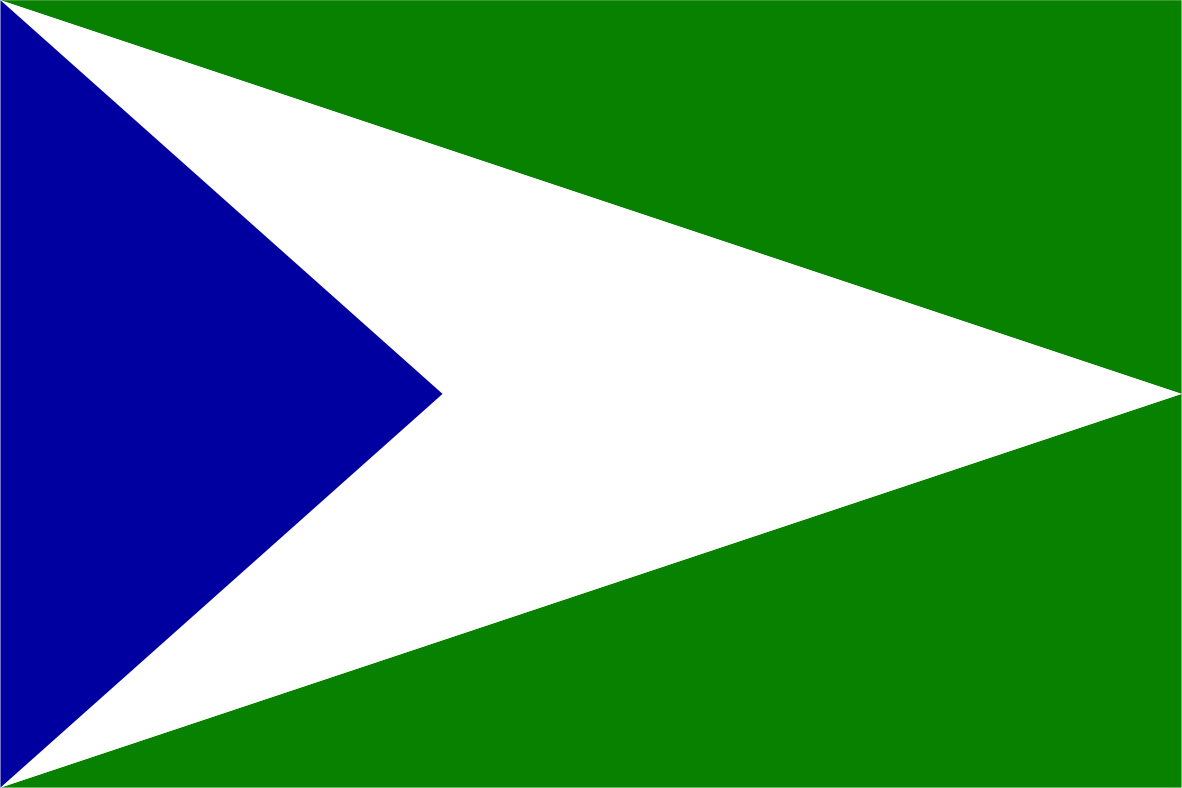
Banner of the District of Oxapampa - Province of Oxapampa - Pasco Region

Oxapampa District is one of eight districts of Oxapampa Province, one of three provinces in Pasco Department in Peru. The town of Oxapampa is in the district and is the capital of the province. The population of the province was 16,565 in 2017 of which more than 14,000 lived in the town of Oxapampa.

== Places of interest ==
- Yanachaga–Chemillén National Park
