= Cerro de la Sal =

Mountain in Peru

- Location within Peru

Geography
- Location: Pasco Department, Peru
- Range coordinates: 10°41′28″S 75°16′23″W

The Cerro de la Sal or Cerro de Sal, (Mountain of Salt) is located in Villa Rica District of Oxapampa Province in Pasco Department, Peru. The Cerro de la Sal was an important source of salt for the pre-Columbian indigenous people of the Amazon Basin in Peru. Because of the seasonal concentration at the mountain by indigenous people (Indians), especially the Asháninka and Yanesha (Amuesha), Spanish missionaries, settlers, and soldiers were attracted to the Cerro de la Sal as early as 1635. Several attempts by Franciscan missionaries to establish Roman Catholic missions in the area were thwarted by uprisings of the indigenous people. In the late 19th century the Peruvian government established a foothold leading to the settlement of Europeans and Andean peoples in the area.

Cerro de la Sal is used loosely to refer to the surrounding region and to the chain of mountains extending eastward from the salt deposits.

== Description ==
Google Earth locates the Cerro de la Sal about 7 kilometres (4.3 miles) north of the town of Villa Rica. José Amich, an 18th-century Franciscan missionary, described the Cerro (mountain or hill) as shaped like a loaf of bread, running for "three leagues," 12.5 kilometres (7.8 miles), to the southwest and many more leagues to the northeast. The vein of salt was on the surface near the summit of the mountain and was "thirty varas," 23 metres (75 ft) wide. The salt was mixed with stone and red clay. The Cerro de la Sal extends southwestern to near the Paucartambo River which merges with the Chanchamayo River from the south. Below the junction, the river was initially called the River de la Sal, but later became known as the Perené River. The rivers were the principal means of transporting the salt from the Cerro to the people living in the lowlands of the Amazon Basin.

The Cerro de la Sal has an elevation of about 1,750 metres (5,740 ft) and is surrounded by higher mountains that rise to a maximum elevation of about 2,800 metres (9,200 ft). Below elevations of about 1,550 metres (5,090 ft) the climate is tropical rainforest (Af in the Köppen Classification). Above that elevation the climate is sub-tropical (Cfb in the Köppen Classification).

== Indigenous people ==
In pre-Columbian times, the indigenous people living in the Cerro de la Sal area had commercial relationships with the Inca Empire, but retained their independence.

The Cerro de la Sal was the preferred source of salt for the region to the east called the Gran Pajonal with indications that it was traded as far away as Brazil to the Tupi people, despite the difficulty of transporting water-soluble salt in a humid region. The Asháninka or Campa who lived in the Amazon basin east of the Cerro and in the Gran Pajonal, seem to have exercised control over the salt deposits, bartering the rights to mine the salt for feathers, birds, monkeys, clothes, and other items with other peoples. The Yanesa (Amuesha), who lived north of the Cerro, were also present.

The Asháninka and others congregated near the Cerro by the hundreds in the comparatively dry months of July through September to mine the salt. The workers cut blocks of salt from the vein weighing approximately 20 kilograms (44 lb) each. Each block was carried by a porter a few kilometers to the Paucartambo River. The salt was loaded onto balsa wood rafts and transported down the river to the peoples living in the low jungles of the Amazon Basin. As many as 600 rafts per season carried salt down the rivers.

During the other nine months of the year the Cerro de la Sal was almost abandoned. A Spanish expedition in May 1691 found only 44 people there of whom a few were mining salt. Reasons for the seasonality of people at the Cerro de la Sal include the difficulty of navigating the flooded highland rivers during the rainy season and the fact that the Cerro has an elevation above the 1,500 metres (4,900 ft) maximum elevation for the cultivation of manioc, the principal food crop of the indigenous people of the low jungles.

== Catholic missionaries ==
The Spanish religious, military and secular authorities realized the strategic importance of the Cerro de la Sal early in the 17th century. Roman Catholic Franciscan missionaries were attracted to the Cerro de la Sal because of the seasonal congregation of large numbers of indigenous people there. A large number of Christian missions collectively called the Cerro de la Sal missions would be established in the region. In 1635 a Franciscan mission was established at Quimiri, later La Merced, and the Franciscans requested 50 Spanish soldiers to control access to the salt mines to bring the indigenous people under the control of the Spanish. The indigenous people were resistant. In 1637, the pioneering missionaries, Jerónimo Jimenez and Cristóbal Larrios, and five more Spaniards were killed by the indigenous. In 1641 and 1645, five additional Franciscans were killed and the Cerro de la Sal missions were abandoned.

From about 1645 to 1651 a Spanish adventurer known as Pedro Bohórquez led an expedition of 40 men to the Cerro de la Sal area in search of the fabled city of Paititi, reputed to be lost in the Amazon rain forests. During a stay at Quimiri, Bohórquez and his men abused the local Asháninka people, some of whom had been converted to Christianity by the Franciscans. In 1673, the Franciscans returned again to the Cerro de la Sal area, but in 1674 a convert named Mangoré killed 5 missionaries with arrows. Mangoré opposed the Franciscan's attempt to abolish polygyny. Mangoré's attempts to wipe out the Christians ended when Christian converts killed him at Quimiri. The missions of Quimiri and Huancabamba survived that uprising, but were destroyed and three priests killed in 1694.

In 1709, the Franciscans came back to the Cerro de la Sal area, this time with more resources and personnel. From a base at the Convent of Santa Rosa de Ocopa in the Andes, they reestablished missions at Cerro de la Sal and Quimiri, and along the salt trading route down the Perene River at Metraro, Eneno, Epillo, Pichana, and San Judas Tadeo. To attract the indigenous people the missionaries distributed steel knives and fishhooks as well as religious materials. Once again the missions failed. An epidemic in 1722-1723 reduced the population of Eneno from 800 to 220 and the other Cerro de la Sal missions suffered similarly. The indigenous people avoided the missions, associating them with disease and death. From 1742 to 1752, a messianic movement headed by Juan Santos Atahualpa destroyed the missions and the Spanish lost control of Cerro de la Sal and much of the region. The indigenous people led by Juan Santos defeated Spanish military expeditions sent to the region and for the next 100 years were unmolested by the Spanish and their Peruvian successors. Eleven Franciscan missionaries in the Cerro de la Sal missions were killed by the indigenous people during the 18th century.

== Peru gains control ==
The Peruvian government, now independent from Spain, established a fortress in 1842 at what became the town of San Ramon along the Chanchamayo River 35 kilometres (22 miles) south of the Cerro de la Sal. Thus, the government began the reconquest of the region lost during the Juan Santos Atahualpa rebellion. It was a "violent conquest" and initially unsuccessful due to the opposition of the Asháninka. Military expeditions in 1868 and 1869 were unsuccessful, but destroyed or confiscated much Ashásnika property. The government proposed stationing up to 200 soldiers at the Cerro de la Sal. This was never realized, but beginning in 1873, the Peruvian government promoted the settlement of people imported from Europe. Several thousand Italians were settled south of the Cerro de la Sal in Asháninka territory and Germans and Austrians were settled north of the Cerro in Amuesha territory. In the 1890s, a British company, the Peruvian Corporation, gained a concession along the rivers near the Cerro de la Sal and sold land to British and Dutch settlers. Peruvians, including landless Peruvians displaced in the Andes, also began to migrate into the region to obtain land.

In 1896 and 1897 a Catholic priest, Gabriel Sala, visited the Cerro de la Sal. He found that European settlers had been preventing the indigenous people from mining the salt for their use and instead enslaving them to exploit the salt for commerce. The government encouraged the settlers to exploit the salt by granting it exemptions from taxes and created a Salt Monopoly to market the salt. The response of the Asháninka had been to destroy the farmsteads of British settlers. However, the advance of the European and Andean settlers (plus Chinese brought in as farm workers) during the rubber boom was inexorable and the indigenous were forced away from the Cerro de la Sal. The nearby town of Villa Rica was founded in 1928 by settlers of German ancestry from Pozuzo and coffee became the principal cash crop of the region. Until the 1980s the indigenous people continued to visit Cerro de la Sal and extract salt to carry back to their homes in the more remote parts of the Amazon Basin.
