= Pozuzo District =

Coordinates: 10°04′10.58″S 75°33′02.45″W

Pozuzo
- District
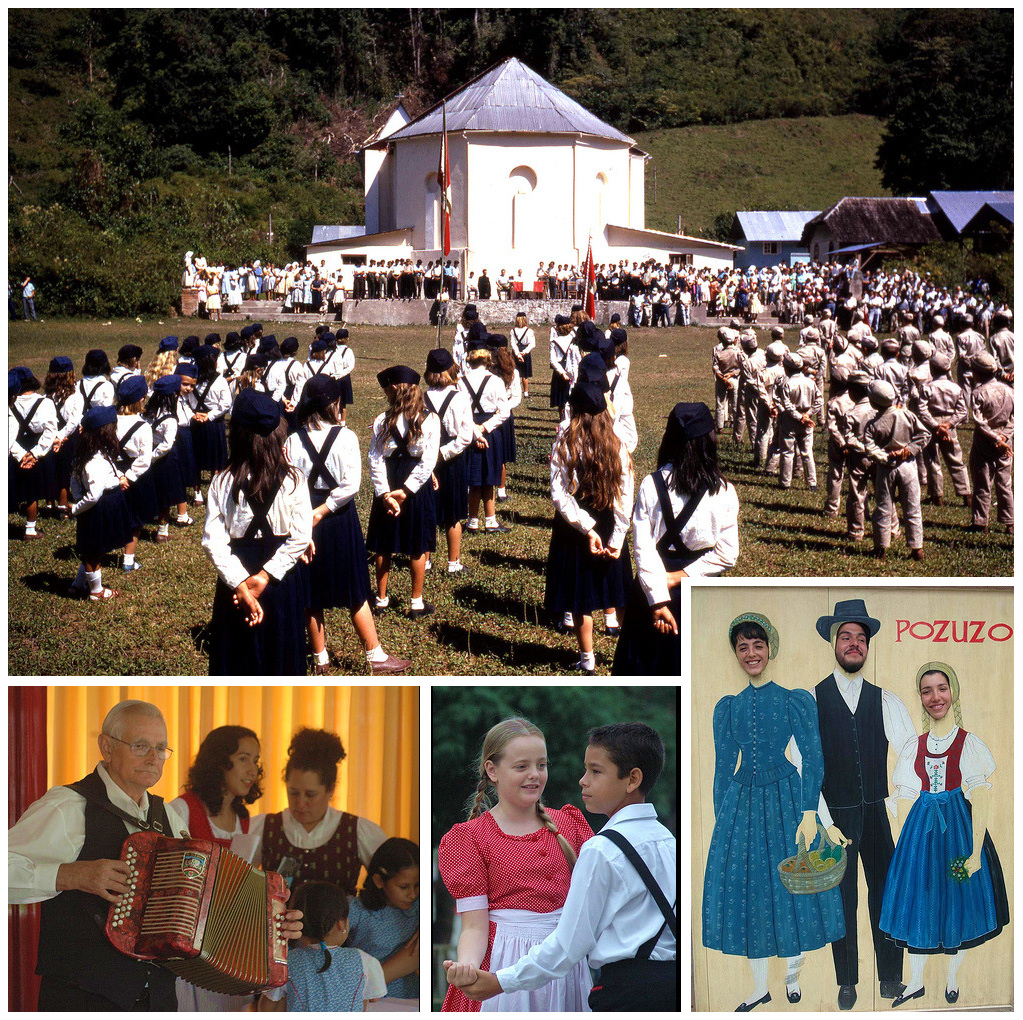

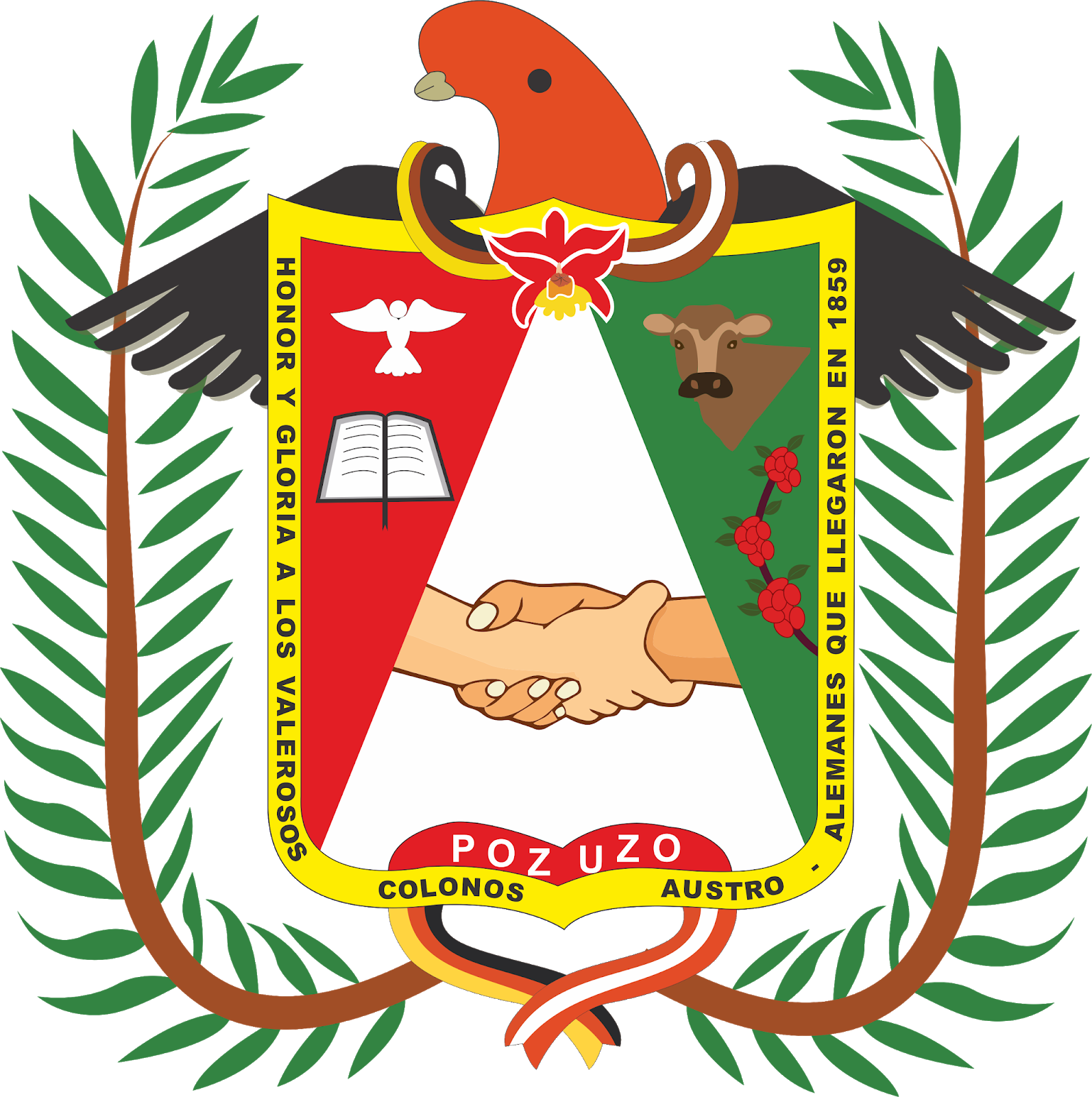
- Flag Coat of arms
- Interactive map of Pozuzo
- Country: Peru
- Region: Pasco
- Province: Oxapampa
- Founded: November 29, 1918
- Capital: Pozuzo

Government
  - Mayor: Nilton Ballesteros Crisanto

Area
  - Total: 1,394.4 km^{2} (538.4 sq mi)
- Elevation: 731 m (2,398 ft)

Population (2017)
  - Total: 4,511
  - Density: 3.235/km^{2} (8.379/sq mi)
- Time zone: UTC-5 (PET)
- UBIGEO: 190305

Pozuzo District is one of eight districts of the Oxapampa Province in the Pasco Department of Peru. The two towns in the district are the capital, Pozuzo, population 1,366 in 2017, and Prusia, which is smaller.

Pozuzo District is best known for the colonists from Austria and Germany who established one of the first European settlements (in Peru) east of the Andes in remote Pozuzo District in 1859. Traces of German culture remain in the architecture and culture of the district.

== Tourism ==
- Pozuzo Tourism

== Climate ==
Climate data for Pozuzo, elevation 746 m (2,448 ft), (1991–2020)
Month	Jan	Feb	Mar	Apr	May	Jun	Jul	Aug	Sep	Oct	Nov	Dec	Year
Mean daily maximum °C (°F)	28.1 (82.6)	27.7 (81.9)	28.2 (82.8)	28.6 (83.5)	28.4 (83.1)	28.3 (82.9)	28.4 (83.1)	29.6 (85.3)	30.2 (86.4)	29.8 (85.6)	29.2 (84.6)	28.2 (82.8)	28.7 (83.7)
Mean daily minimum °C (°F)	19.9 (67.8)	19.9 (67.8)	19.6 (67.3)	19.4 (66.9)	19.3 (66.7)	18.2 (64.8)	17.7 (63.9)	17.6 (63.7)	18.0 (64.4)	19.1 (66.4)	19.7 (67.5)	20.1 (68.2)	19.0 (66.3)
Average precipitation mm (inches)	296.2 (11.66)	301.9 (11.89)	287.9 (11.33)	206.0 (8.11)	122.7 (4.83)	77.5 (3.05)	63.1 (2.48)	69.0 (2.72)	101.8 (4.01)	186.3 (7.33)	216.2 (8.51)	329.1 (12.96)	2,257.7 (88.88)
Source: National Meteorology and Hydrology Service of Peru
