= El Sira Communal Reserve =

Protected area in Peru

- Reserva Comunal El Sira
- IUCN category VI (protected area with sustainable use of natural resources)
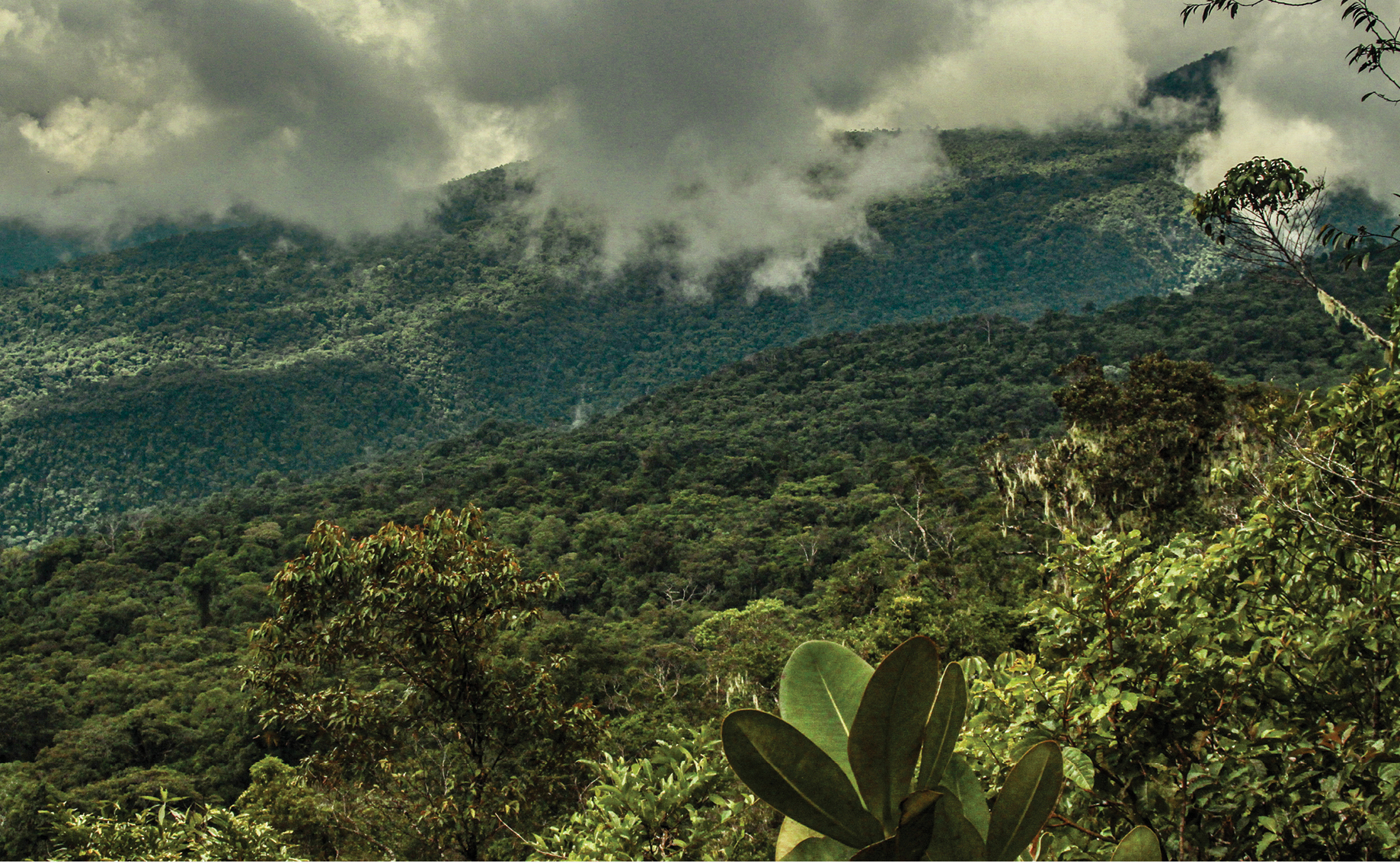
- Panoramic view of the Reserva Comunal El Sira

- Location within Peru
- Location: Peru; Regions of Huanuco, Pasco and Ucayali
- Coordinates: 9°52′26″S 74°30′43″W
- Area: 616,413 ha (2,379.98 sq mi)
- Established: June 22, 2001
- Governing body: SERNANP
- Website: Reserva Comunal El Sira (in Spanish)

El Sira Communal Reserve (Spanish: Reserva Comunal El Sira) is a protected area in Peru created to preserve the biodiversity of the Sira Mountains and the ancestral sustainable use of the area's resources by the nearby native peoples. It also protects the headwaters of the Pachitea river basin. The reserve covers an area of 616,413 hectares (6,164.13 km^{2}) within the regions of Huánuco, Pasco and Ucayali. The reserve was created in 2001 and in 2010, UNESCO recognized it as part of the Oxapampa-Asháninka-Yánesha Biosphere Reserve.

== Geography ==
It is located in three regions: the Huánuco Region (Puerto Inca Province), the Pasco Region (Oxapampa Province) and the Ucayali Region (Atalaya Province and Coronel Portillo Province). El Sira Communal Reserve is located in the east-central area of Peru, part of the Eastern Cordillera of the Andes, within the sub-Andean belt; between latitudes 09º 03' and 10º 22' and longitudes 74º 05' and 74º 48'. The SCR presents an altitudinal gradient from 130 to 2250 meters above sea level and is influenced by the basins of the Ucayali, Pachitea and Pichis rivers.

== Climate ==
The average annual temperature is 25.5 °C. Average monthly temperatures fluctuate between 24.6 °C and 25.8 °C. The lowest temperatures occur in the third quarter of the year and the highest in the last quarter. Extreme temperatures fluctuate between 15 °C (the lowest) and 33 °C (the highest), with 15 °C being the average oscillation between extreme maximum and minimum temperatures.

The lower parts at less than 1000 masl are warm and rainy. The highlands that exceed 1000 masl present a climate that varies from semi-dry to very humid. The last and first trimester of each year have the highest rainfall. The dry season corresponds to the second and third trimesters, reaching 107 mm of precipitation in August. On the western flank of the mountain range there are phenomena that favor greater condensation of cloud bodies, unlike the east side (Ucayali basin). The values recorded for Puerto Bermúdez indicate an annual total of 3312.9 mm, unlike the values recorded for Pucallpa and Atalaya, which do not exceed records of 2500 mm per year. In the south of the reserve the landscape known as Gran Pajonal is less hot and humid, with average temperature values of 18.5 °C.

== Hydrography and hydrology ==
The Reserve is located mainly in the upper or middle sectors of the tributaries of the Ucayali river basins (on the left bank), Pachitea and Pichis (on the right bank). The southern part of the reserve is located between the upper sectors of the tributaries of the Pichis, Ucayali and Unini rivers. The eastern sector of the buffer zone is made up of the Ucayali River; while the western sector is in the basin of the Pachitea and Pichis rivers.

The Ucayali River, originating in the Peruvian Andes, borders the eastern part of the El Sira mountain range, with a south - north route. It is characterized by being meandering with few lentic environments in the area adjacent to the aforementioned Cordillera. Its water course has a great lateral migratory activity, which causes the formation of lentic environments - locally known as "tipishcas". These environments are the product of a meander that has been abandoned by the course of the river. The flow of the Ucayali river at the height of Pucallpa is 11,599 m3/s, and at the height of Atalaya 6613 m3/s.

The Pachitea River is a tributary of the Ucayali River, flowing into the left bank downstream of the village of Santa Rosa. Its waters come from the Peruvian Andes. It is formed from the union of the Pichis and Palcazu rivers. In its south - north route it borders the western part of the northern sector of the El Sira mountain range. It is also a meandering river with scarce lentic environments in the area adjacent to the aforementioned Cordillera. According to ONERN in 1980, the flow of the Pachitea River at its confluence with the Ucayali River is 2412 m3/s.

The Pichis River, born in the Peruvian Andes, borders the western part of the center - south sector of the Cordillera El Sira with a south-north route. It is a winding river with scarce lentic environments in the area adjacent to the aforementioned Cordillera. When uniting with the Palcazu it gives origin to the Pachitea river. The navigability of these rivers is an important factor that makes them the primary communication channel for the area. One of the main means of fluvial communication for the reserve is the Ucayali River. This river is navigable from the main port of Pucallpa to the confluence of the Tambo and Urubamba rivers, where the provincial capital of Atalaya is located. The Pichis and Pachitea rivers allow the navigation of boats with outboard motors from their confluence to Puerto Bermúdez. In general, navigability improves in rainy seasons.

== Flora ==
The type of vegetation in the reserve is tropical forest and highland rainforest. More than 500 species of trees can be found in the reserve including: Sapium glandulosum, Bunchosia armeniaca, Iriartea deltoidea, Weinmannia spp., Manilkara bidentata, Pourouma cecropiifolia, Ilex spp., Theobroma cacao, Nectandra spp., Ceiba pentandra, Pouteria caimito, Brosimum alicastrum, Inga spp. etc.

== Fauna ==
Mammals found in the area include: the brown woolly monkey, the brown-mantled tamarin, the southern two-toed sloth, the nine-banded armadillo, the Brazilian cottontail, the Bolivian squirrel, the pacarana, the paca, the spectacled bear, the puma, the jaguar, the South American tapir, the collared peccary, the red brocket, the giant otter, the capybara, etc.

Birds protected in the reserve include: the red-and-green macaw, the fiery-throated fruiteater, the Sira tanager, the Sira curassow, the Andean cock-of-the-rock, the Peruvian tyrannulet, the violet-fronted brilliant, the sickle-winged guan, black-streaked puffbird, the scarlet-breasted fruiteater, the southern mealy amazon, Koepcke's hermit, etc.

In addition, some 105 species of reptiles have been reported, of the families of the Amphisbaenidae, saurians and especially snakes. Also 68 species of amphibians, mostly toads and frogs of the families Hylidae and Leptodactylidae, are known from the reserve. Finally, 111 species of bony fish have been reported, the most diverse being Characiformes.
