= Chontabamba District =

Coordinates: 10.6257°S 75.5124°W

Chontabamba Chuntapampa
- District
- Interactive map of Chontabamba
- Country: Peru
- Region: Pasco
- Province: Oxapampa
- Founded: November 27, 1944
- Capital: Chontabamba

Government
  - Mayor: Wilson Huaman Mego

Area
  - Total: 364.96 km^{2} (140.91 sq mi)
- Elevation: 1,900 m (6,200 ft)

Population (2005 census)
  - Total: 3,095
  - Density: 8.480/km^{2} (21.96/sq mi)
- Time zone: UTC-5 (PET)
- UBIGEO: 190302

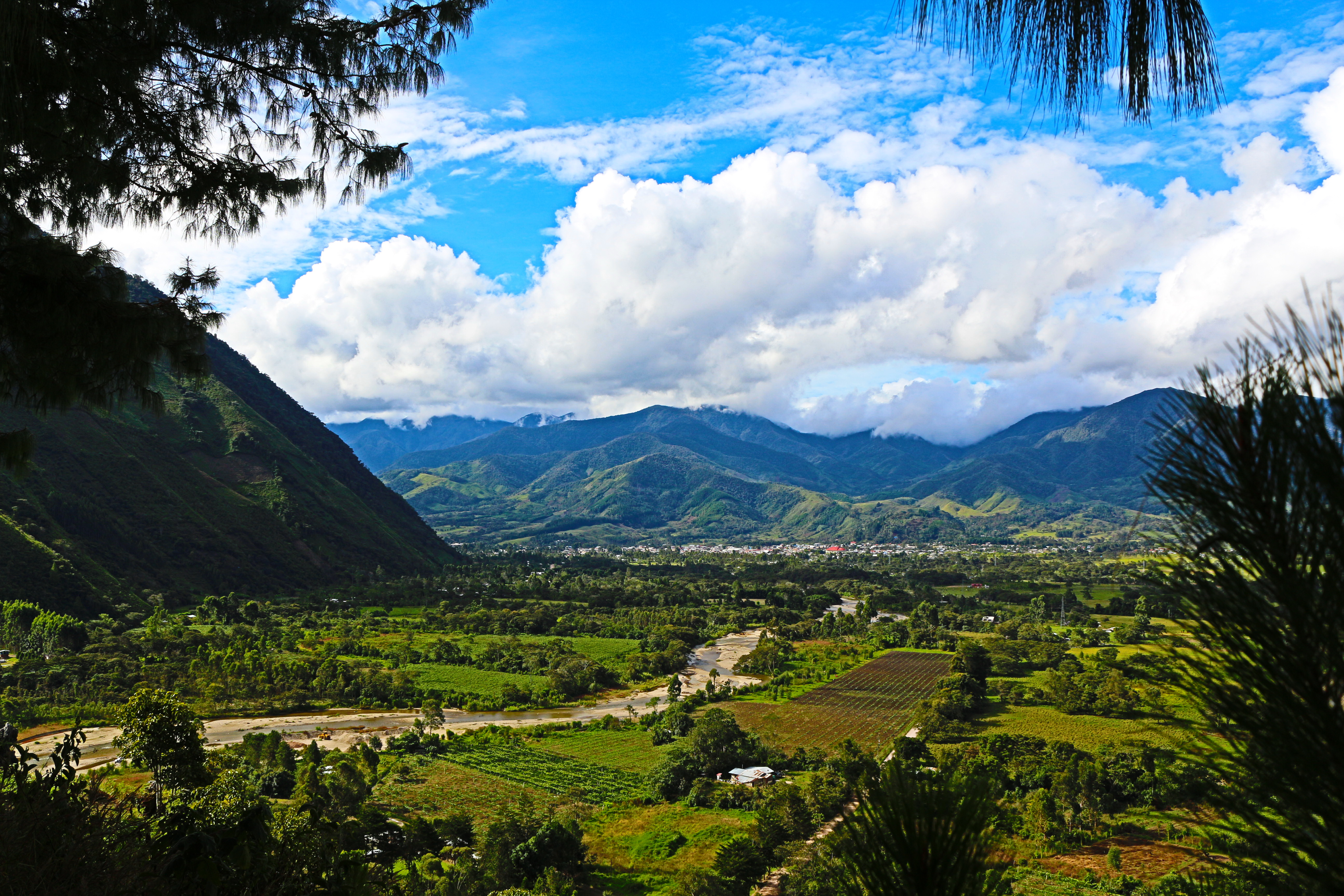
Río Chontabamba (upper course of the Río Huancabamba) on the left, the road from Chontabamba to Oxapampa, on the right

Chontabamba District is one of eight districts of the province Oxapampa in Peru.

== Climate ==
Climate data for Oxapampa, Chontabamba, elevation 1,801 m (5,909 ft), (1991–2020)
Month	Jan	Feb	Mar	Apr	May	Jun	Jul	Aug	Sep	Oct	Nov	Dec	Year
Mean daily maximum °C (°F)	23.0 (73.4)	22.8 (73.0)	23.1 (73.6)	23.4 (74.1)	23.2 (73.8)	22.9 (73.2)	22.9 (73.2)	23.6 (74.5)	23.9 (75.0)	24.0 (75.2)	24.0 (75.2)	23.2 (73.8)	23.3 (74.0)
Mean daily minimum °C (°F)	14.0 (57.2)	14.1 (57.4)	13.7 (56.7)	13.1 (55.6)	12.7 (54.9)	11.8 (53.2)	11.0 (51.8)	11.0 (51.8)	11.2 (52.2)	12.7 (54.9)	13.3 (55.9)	13.9 (57.0)	12.7 (54.9)
Average precipitation mm (inches)	203.0 (7.99)	223.4 (8.80)	194.4 (7.65)	96.2 (3.79)	48.7 (1.92)	30.9 (1.22)	36.1 (1.42)	42.1 (1.66)	55.8 (2.20)	108.4 (4.27)	114.9 (4.52)	195.9 (7.71)	1,349.8 (53.15)
Source: National Meteorology and Hydrology Service of Peru
