= Regional Government of Pasco =

Regional government in Peru

- Gobierno Regional de Pasco

Regional Government overview
- Formed: January 1, 2003; 22 years ago
- Jurisdiction: Department of Pasco
- Website: Government site

The Regional Government of Pasco (Spanish: Gobierno Regional de Pasco; GORE Pasco) is the regional government that represents the Department of Pasco. It is the body with legal identity in public law and its own assets, which is in charge of the administration of provinces of the department in Peru. Its purpose is the social, cultural and economic development of its constituency. It is based in the city of Cerro de Pasco.

== List of representatives ==
Governor	Political party	Period
Víctor Espinoza Soto	Concertación en la Región por la Descentralización	January 1, 2003–December 31, 2006
Félix Rivera Serrano	Movimiento Nueva Izquierda	January 1, 2007–December 31, 2010
Kléver Meléndez Gamarra	Alianza Regional Todos por Pasco	January 1, 2011–December 31, 2014
Teódulo Quispe Huertas	Fuerza Popular	January 1, 2015–December 31, 2018
Pedro Ubaldo Polinar	Alianza para el Progreso	January 1, 2019–December 31, 2022
Juan Luis Chombo Heredia	Somos Perú	January 1, 2023–Incumbent

== See also ==
- Regional Governments of Peru
- Department of Pasco
