= Pozuzo =

Village in Pasco, Peru

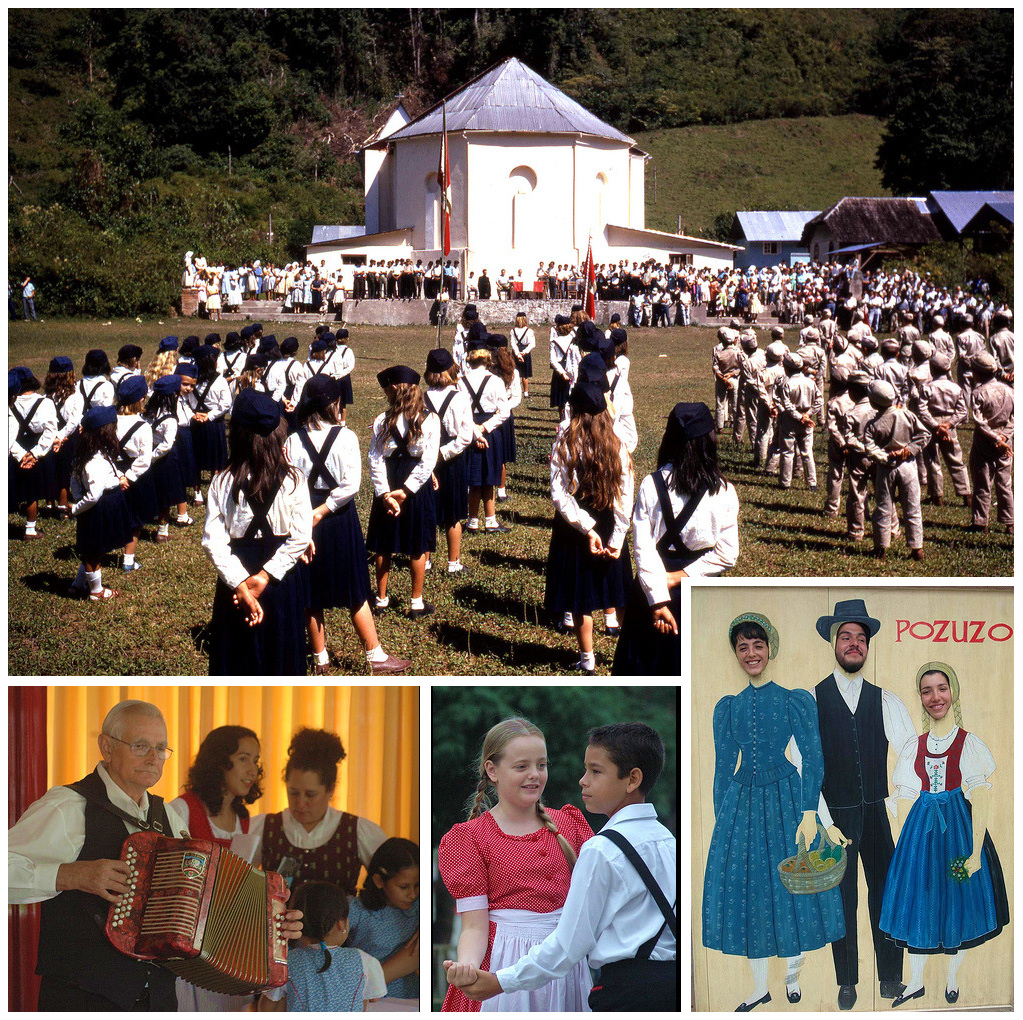
- German heritage of Pozuzo

- Flag

- Location in Peru
- Coordinates: 10.071°S 75.552°W
- Country: Peru
- Region: Pasco
- Province: Oxapampa
- District: Pozuzo District
- Founded: 1859
- Elevation: 739 m (2,425 ft)

Population (2017)
  - Total: 1,366
- Time zone: UTC−5 (PET)

Pozuzo is a village and district in the Oxapampa Province and Pasco Region of Peru. The village, at an elevation of 739 metres (2,425 ft), is situated near the left bank of the Huancabamba River which is renamed the Pozuzo River after it passes by the village. The population of the village in 2017 was 1,366. Pozuzo was established in 1859 by Austrian and German immigrants to Peru and traces of German culture and architecture survived into the 21st century. Pozuzo was isolated and difficult to access until 1976 when a vehicle road was completed linking the village with the town of Oxapampa, 80 kilometres (50 miles) north.

== History ==
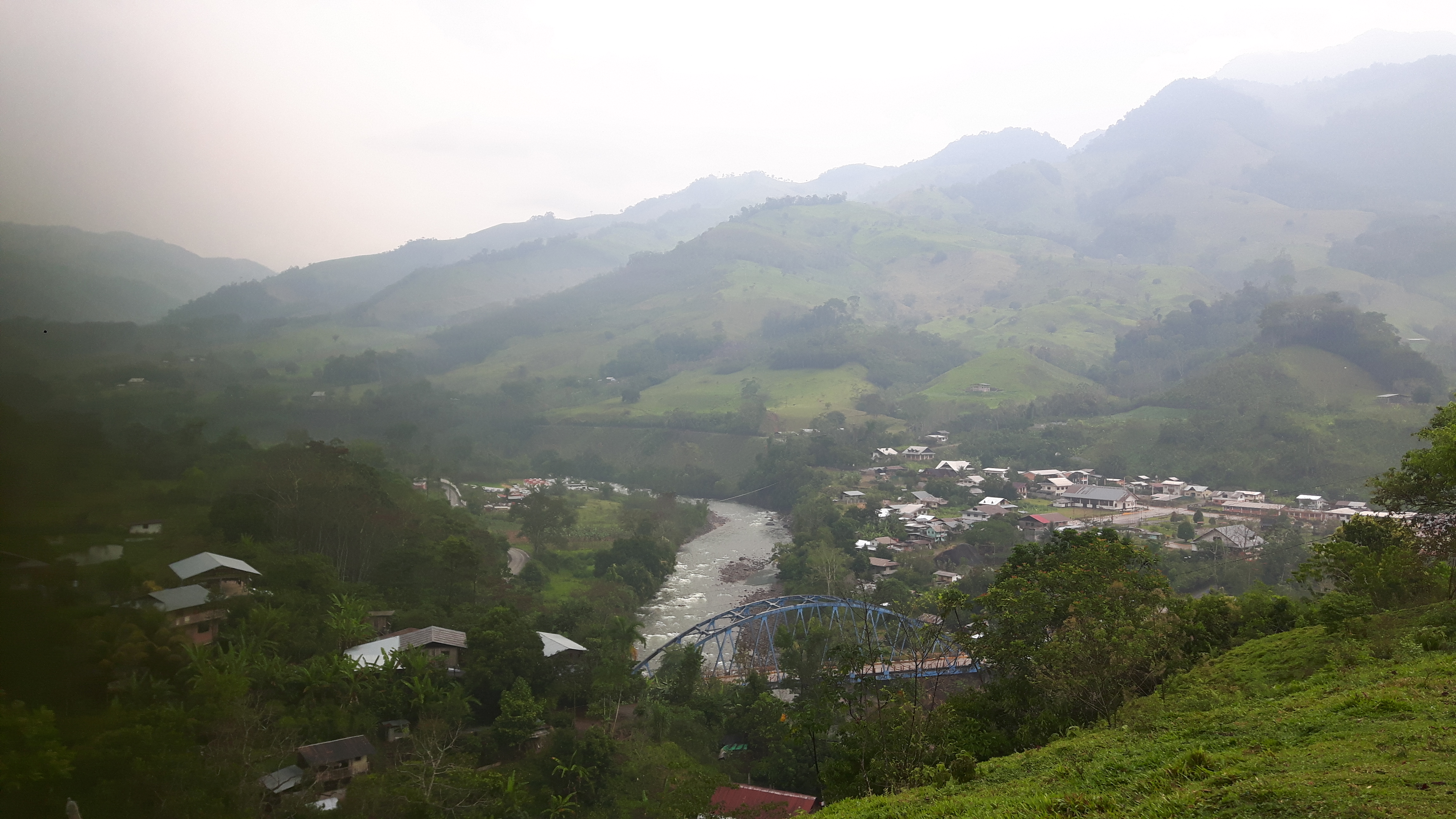
Prusia and the Huancabamba River entering Pozuzo District.

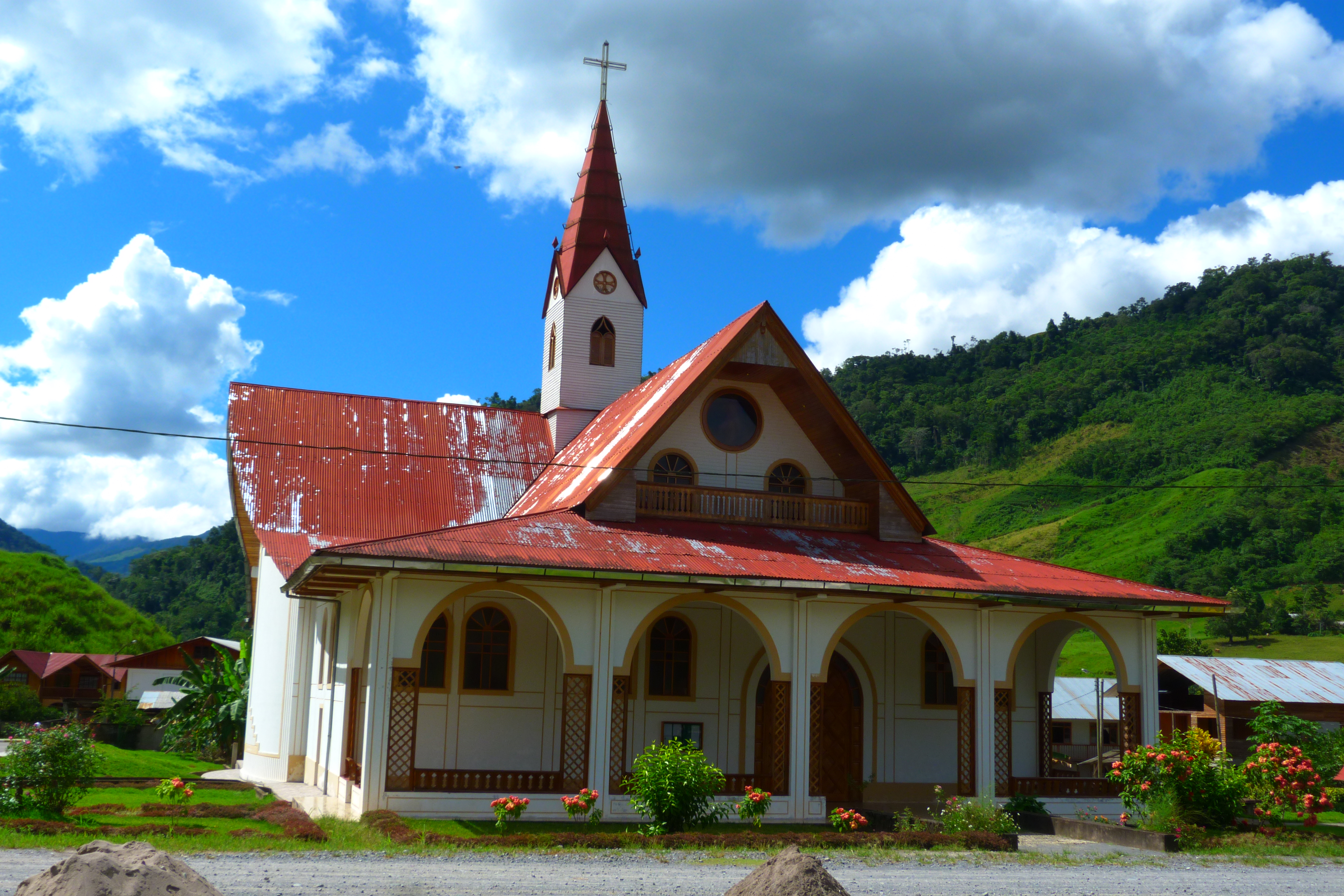
The church in Prusia, south of Pozuzo.

=== 18th century ===
Franciscan missionaries established a mission at Pozuzo in 1712, but the colony and mission was abandoned or destroyed in the 1740s or 1750s in the Juan Santos Rebellion by the Asháninka ("Campa" is offensive) people of the area. The colony was reestablished and a bridge was constructed across the Pozuzo river about 1790.

=== 19th century ===
When explorer William Smyth reached Pozuzo in 1828, the Franciscans had abandoned Pozuzo, and the only inhabitants were one Asháninka family; although, other indigenous farmers lived nearby and cultivated coca, sugar cane, squash, and cassava (yuca). Smyth described the mule trail leading eastward from the Andes highlands to Pozuzo as narrow and dangerous.

In the 1850s, Peruvian President Ramón Castilla proposed building a railroad from the capital city of Lima, across the Andes Mountains, and onward to the navigable rivers of the Amazon Basin. Part of the plan (the only part realized) was to import German and Austrian Catholics to settle on the eastern slopes of the Andes and in the tropical rainforests of the Amazon region, then populated only by indigenous people. In 1855, the Peruvian leader signed an agreement with German traveler Kuno Damian von Schütz-Holzhausen to recruit 10,000 Germans and Austrians to emigrate to Peru and establish colonies on the eastern flanks of the Andes. The Peruvian government agreed to pay the cost of the passage from Europe to Peru of the emigrants and the cost of transporting them overland to Pozuzo and other areas designated for their settlement. On arrival in Pozuzo, each family would receive 40 hectares (99 acres) of farmland. Single men would receive 24 hectares (59 acres).

Schütz traveled to Germany in 1856 to recruit settlers and assembled a group of 302 persons, about 200 from the Tyrol and 100 from Moselle and Prussia. Among the colonists were two Roman Catholic priests, one of whom was José Egg, a leader among the colonists. Most of the colonists were poor peasants and artisans with large families. The group departed Antwerp on the sailing ship Norton on 26 March 1857 and arrived in the port of Callao, Peru, on 8 August 1857. On arrival Schütz found that the Peruvian government had done little to prepare for the arrival of the colonists and their transportation to Pozuzo. The colonists undertook a difficult journey on foot and mule to reach Pozuzo, starting from the port of Huacho, reaching an elevation of more than 4,700 metres (15,400 ft) crossing the Andes, to Cerro de Pasco, onward to Acobamba (Ambo), and, constructing the road en route, to Pozuzo. The town was established in 1859 by 172 of the original 302 colonists who had departed Europe together. Many had deserted en route or had died or been killed during the journey.

One of the early decisions of the colonists was to separate the land allocated to the Prussians and the Tyroleans. The Prussians settled 5 kilometres (3.1 miles) south of Pozuzo and established the village of Prusia; the Tyroleans established the village of Pozuzo.

Pozuzo was one of the few German colonies in the Amazon basin of Peru in the 19th century that survived and prospered. By 1889, Pozuzo had a population of 565 persons, nearly all of them farmers. Among a variety of crops grown the most important commercial crops were tobacco, coffee, coca, and rice. In 1891, colonists from Pozuzo founded the town of Oxapampa, which quickly eclipsed Pozuzo in population.

=== 20th century ===
In 1928 the town of Villa Rica was founded, in a coffee growing area. Both Oxapampa and Villa Rica were at a higher elevation and enjoyed a milder climate than Pozuzo.

The Pozuzofest is an Oktoberfest-like celebration held every year.

Pozuzo was isolated from any kind of support for over 100 years from its founding. Until 1975 it was a three-day trek on a muleteer's trail to Huánuco, the nearest medium-sized town. A partly-paved road was built in 1975.

=== 21st century ===
Over the years the Germanic heritage of the people of Pozuzo has become diluted by intermarriage and in-migration from the Andes and the local indigenous people. In 2005, only about 15 percent of the population of about 4,000 in Pozuzo district claimed to have German heritage. In the same year, the first non-Germanic mayor of the town was elected, a man with an Andean heritage.

One resident said in 2023 "Before [the COVID pandemic, which affected Peru severely] we would only receive tourists on special holidays, now we have tourists every day". The annual Pozuzofest attracts hundreds of visitors, some from Peru's capital Lima, 12 hours' drive away, and some from the Austrian Tirol and southern Germany.

== Climate ==
Pozuzo has an Af (tropical with adequate precipitation throughout the year) climate under the Köppen Classification system. Measured by the Trewartha climate classification system the climate is Arbb (tropical, adequate precipitation throughout the year with warm summers and warm winters) Pozuzo's climate is modified by its altitude which results in temperatures several degrees lower year round than the nearby low-elevation tropics. The difference in average temperatures between the warmest and coolest months is only 1.5 degrees C (3 degrees F). The austral winter months of June, July, and August are the driest of the year. }}
