= Yanachaga–Chemillén National Park =

National park in Peru

- Parque Nacional Yanachaga-Chemillén
- IUCN category II (national park)
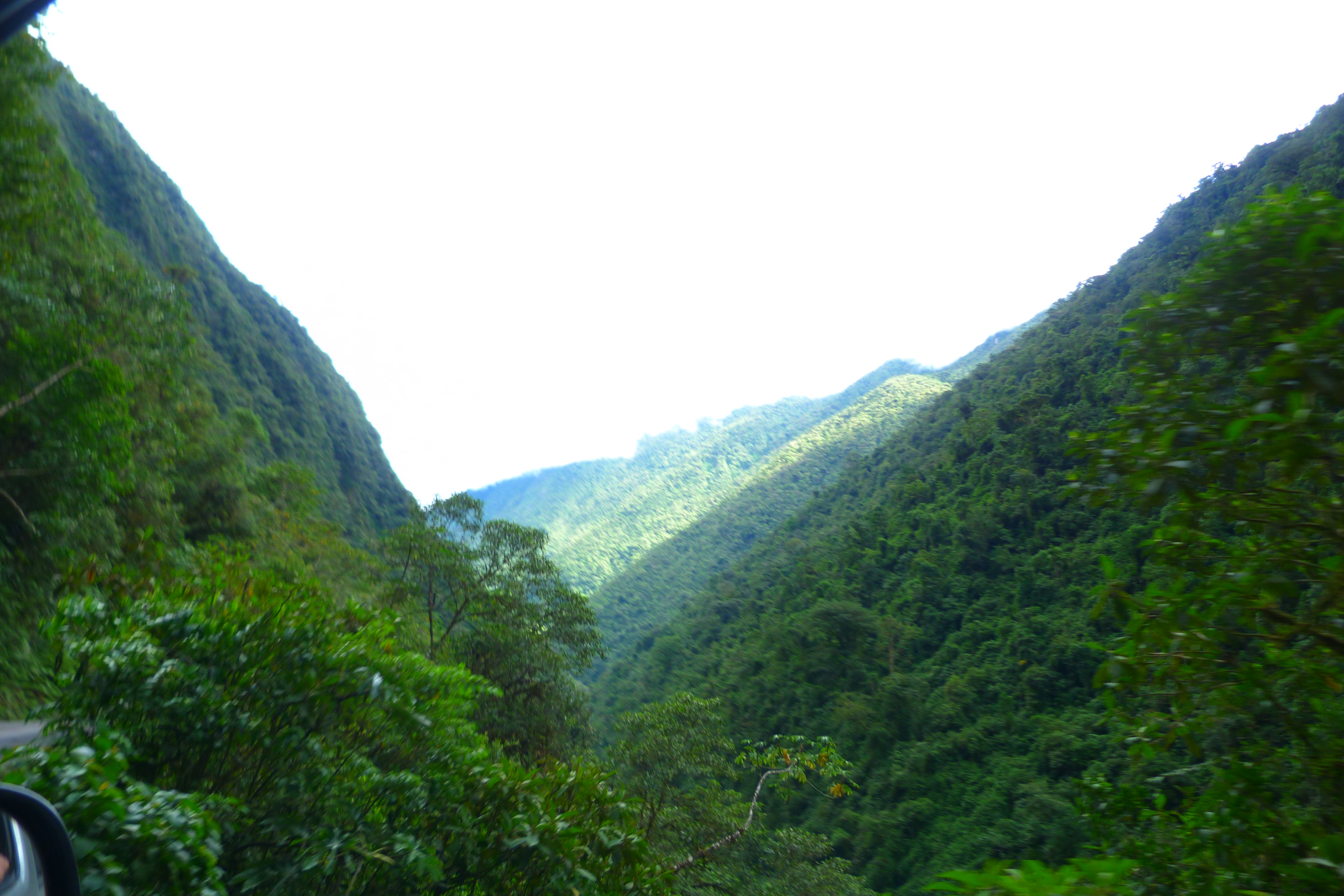
- Small valley inside the park.

- Location within Peru
- Location: Peru; Pasco Region
- Nearest city: Oxapampa
- Coordinates: 10.369°S 75.37°W
- Area: 122,000 hectares (470 sq mi)
- Established: August 29, 1986 (by 068-86-AG)
- Governing body: SERNANP

Yanachaga–Chemillén National Park (Spanish: Parque Nacional Yanachaga-Chemillén) is a protected area located in the region of Pasco, Peru. It preserves part of the rainforests and cloud forests of central Peru.

It is a refuge for wildlife from the Pleistocene, a time when there were severe climatic changes, as evidenced by the diversity of flora and fauna found there.

El Parque Nacional Yanachaga Chemillén (PNYCH) extends over the Yanachaga mountain range. The dominant landscape consists of forest-covered mountains crisscrossed by deep canyons. Overall, its terrain is very rugged, with rocky slopes covered by forests with steep inclines on both the east and west sides of the Palcazu River. Its altitude varies from 460 to 3,643 meters above sea level.

This geographical characteristic, combined with its varied climate, creates a high diversity of ecological formations in a relatively small geographic area, resulting in a significant biological diversity.

From a cultural diversity perspective, the population settled in the buffer zone of the national park can be divided into three main human groups: the indigenous Yanesha people, European-origin settlers (especially Germanic), and Andean immigrants from the central highlands of the country. The Yanesha people are located on the eastern flank of the Yanachaga mountain range, in the Palcazu basin, while the other two groups are mainly located on the western flank of the same mountain range, in the Oxapampa - Pozuzo valley.

== Objective ==
The objective of the park is to preserve the upper parts of the basins of the tributaries of the Palcazu, Huancabamba and Pozuzo rivers, and the natural areas used ancestrally by the Yanesha or Amuesha native communities settled in the region.

== Ecology ==
The faunal diversity of PNYCH is determined by its varied Andean-Patagonian, puna, and Amazonian origins, ranging from lowland to highland rainforests. The area preserves significant populations of native fauna, especially small and medium-sized animals. The park showcases a wide variety of bird species, with a reported existence of 527 different ones.

=== Pleistocene refuge ===
The area occupied by PNYCH is considered a "Pleistocene refuge", (similar to a Glacial refugium), meaning it harbors relict forests as a result of geographic isolation. In a relatively recent geological period that lasted several hundred thousand years, most of the areas now covered by Amazonian forests were occupied by grassland ecosystems due to severe climatic changes. The Pleistocene refuge theory explains why some Amazonian forests exhibit very high biological diversity, as these refuges allowed for the survival and development of numerous species.

=== Flora ===
Forests occupy almost all the area, except for high mountain grasslands. Plant species found in the area include: Retrophyllum rospigliosii, Oenocarpus bataua, Podocarpus oleifolius, Euterpe precatoria, Cedrela odorata, Juglans neotropica, Clarisia racemosa, Phytelephas macrocarpa, Weinmannia spp., Calycophyllum spruceanum, Gynerium sagittatum, etc.

=== Fauna ===
Mammals found in the park include: the capybara, the jaguar, the puma, the white tailed deer, the spectacled bear, the jaguarundi, the ocelot, the lowland paca, the Northern pudu, the common woolly monkey, etc.

The avifauna constitutes the group with the largest number of reported species, with 527. The toucan (Ramphastos ambiguus), the cock-of-the-rock or tunqui (Rupicola peruviana) and the mountain guans stand out.

Representative reptiles the cuvier's dwarf caiman, the spectacled caiman, and amphibians like the frog Ctenophryne barbatula is known only from the Yanachaga–Chemillén National Park.
