= Puerto Bermúdez District =

Coordinates: 10.298°S 74.935°W

Puerto Bermúdez
- District
- Interactive map of Puerto Bermúdez
- Country: Peru
- Region: Pasco
- Province: Oxapampa
- Founded: June 17, 1958
- Capital: Puerto Bermúdez

Government
  - Mayor: Nemecio Mendoza Francisco Viriochi

Area
  - Total: 10,988.1 km^{2} (4,242.5 sq mi)
- Elevation: 250 m (820 ft)

Population (2005 census)
  - Total: 20,474
  - Density: 1.8633/km^{2} (4.8259/sq mi)
- Time zone: UTC-5 (PET)
- UBIGEO: 190306

Puerto Bermúdez District is one of eight districts of the province Oxapampa in Peru.

Location of the village is -10.2977, -74.9352, on the Pichis River.

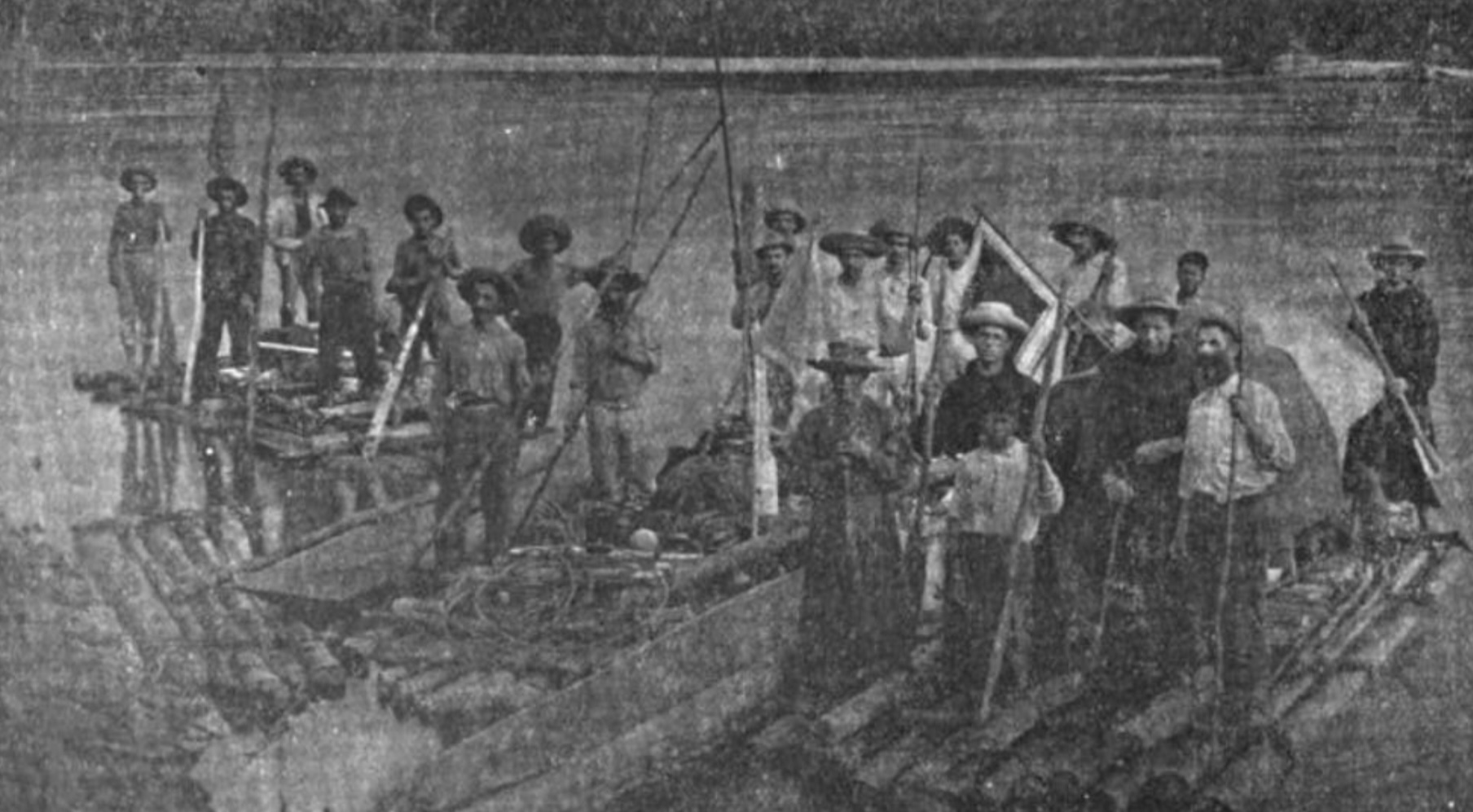
Group prepares to leave Puerto Bermúdez on a journey to Iquitos.
