= Oxapampa province =

Oxapampa
- Province
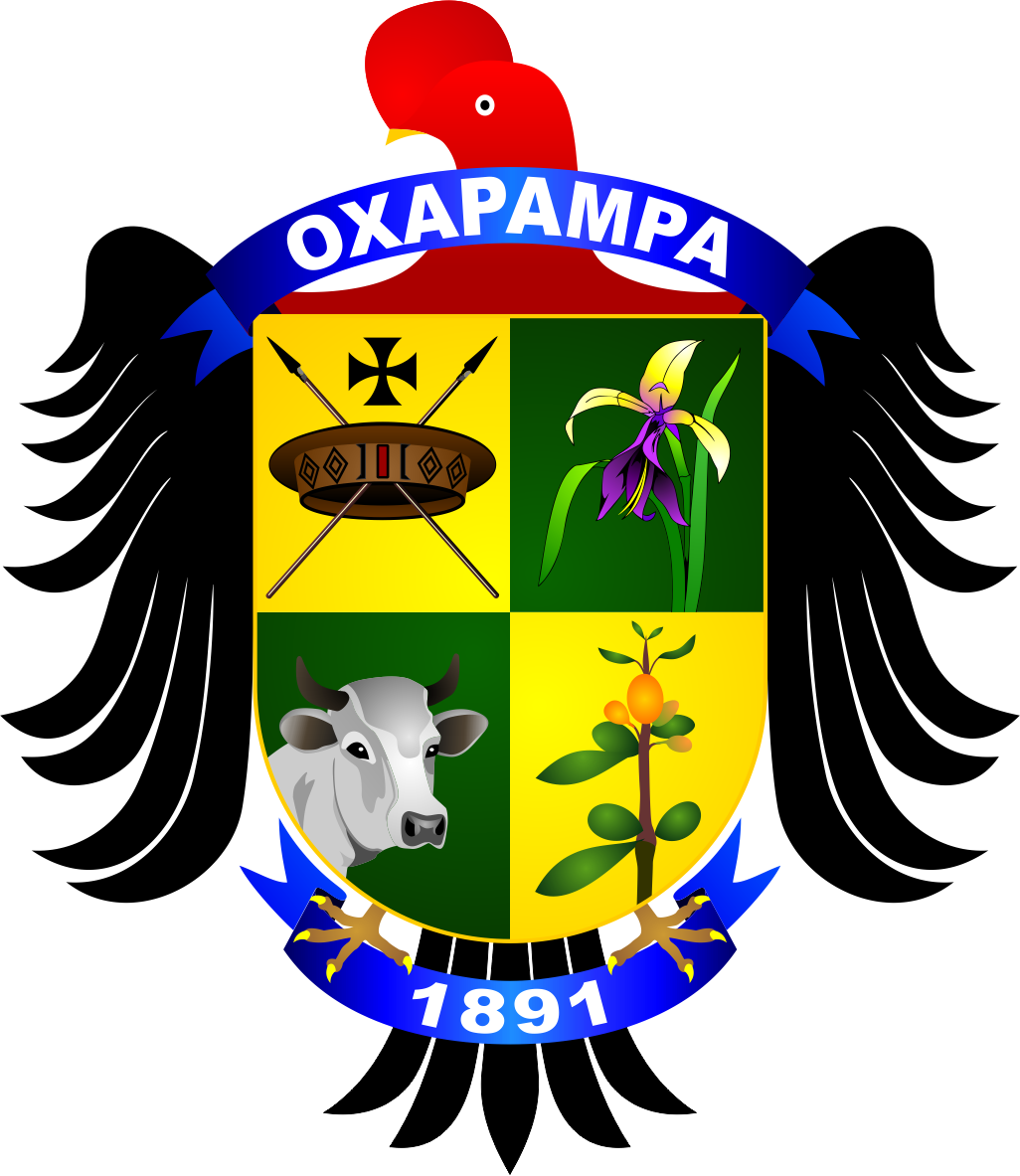
- Flag Coat of arms

- Location of Oxapampa in the Pasco Region
- Country: Peru
- Region: Pasco
- Founded: November 27, 1944
- Capital: Oxapampa

Government
  - Mayor: Juan Carlos La Torre Moscoso

Area
  - Total: 18,673.79 km^{2} (7,209.99 sq mi)

Population
  - Total: 96,169 (2017)
  - Density: 5.1499/km^{2} (13.338/sq mi)
- UBIGEO: 1903
- Website: www.munioxapampa.gob.pe

Historical population
Year	Pop.	±%
1940	5,881	—
1961	25,783	+338.4%
1981	49,857	+93.4%
2007	81,829	+64.1%
2020 (est)	100,561	+22.9%

Oxapampa is the largest of three provinces that make up the Pasco Region in Peru. The capital of the province is the city of Oxapampa. The province is located on the eastern slopes of the Andes reaching down to the lowlands of the Amazon Basin. The high point of the province is approximately 5,300 metres (17,400 ft) in elevation near the summit of Huaguruncho mountain in the Huancabamba District and the low point is approximately 200 metres (660 ft) on the Pachitea River in the Constitución District.

The Cerro de la Sal, an important source of salt for the indigenous people of the Amazon Basin since pre-historic times is located in the Villa Rica District of the province. The southeastern part of the province is the location of the Gran Pajonal (Great Grassland), an elevated plateau occupied by the Asháninka people.

Oxapampa is best known for the colonists from Austria and Germany who established one of the first European settlements (in Peru) east of the Andes in remote Pozuzo District in 1859 and founded the towns of Oxapampa in 1891 and Villa Rica in 1928. Germanic influence remains in the architecture and culture of these districts.

== Political divisions ==
The province of Oxapampa is divided into eight districts (Spanish: distritos, singular: distrito), each of which is headed by a mayor (alcalde):

Flag of Oxapampa

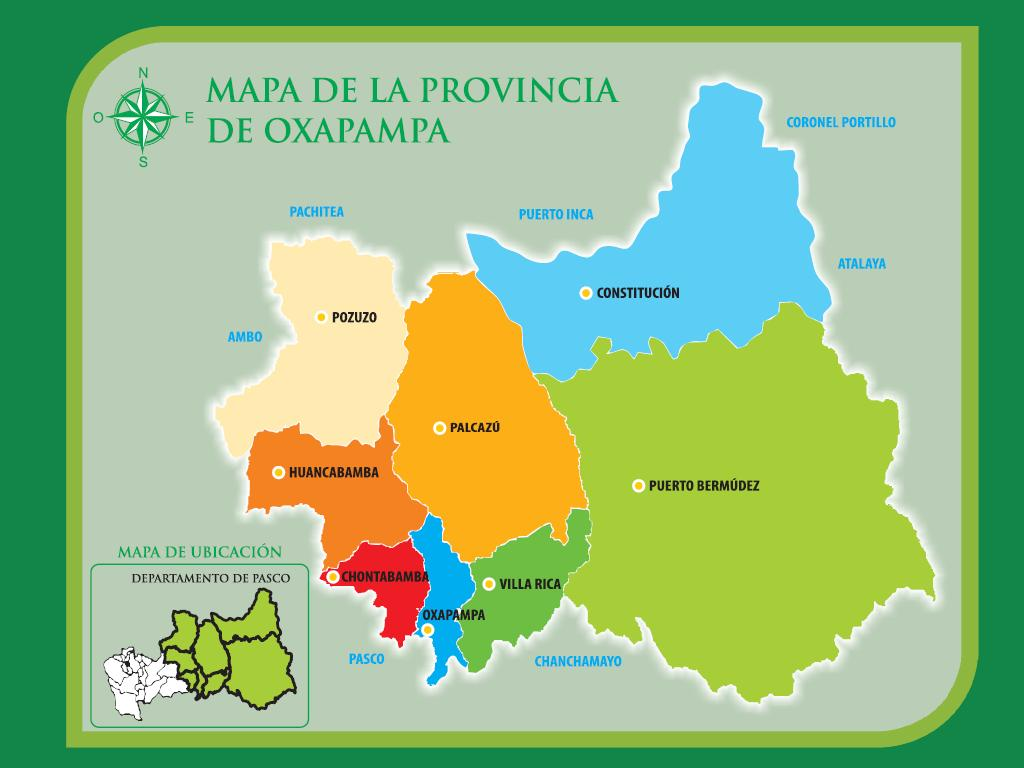
Districts of Oxapampa province.

Districts of Oxapampa Province
District	Capital	Area	Population (1993)	Population (2017)	elevation (of capital)	coordinates
Chontabamba	Chontabamba	450 km^{2} (170 sq mi)	2,460	5,637	1,828 m (5,997 ft)	10.603°S 75.439°W
Constitución	Ciudad Constitución	3,053 km^{2} (1,179 sq mi)	Created 2010	15,230	232 m (761 ft)	9.848°S 75.016°W
Huancabamba	Huancabamba	1,237 km^{2} (478 sq mi)	5,746	6,891	1,666 m (5,466 ft)	10.426°S 75.525°W
Oxapampa District	Oxapampa	412 km^{2} (159 sq mi)	12,826	16,565	1,812 m (5,945 ft)	10.574°S 75.405°W
Palcazú District	Iscozacín	2,887 km^{2} (1,115 sq mi)	5,687	8,257	275 m (902 ft)	10.184°S 75.150°W
Pozuzo District	Pozuzo	1,394 km^{2} (538 sq mi)	5,053	5,128	731 m (2,398 ft)	10.071°S 75.551°W
Puerto Bermúdez District	Puerto Bermúdez	7,634 km^{2} (2,948 sq mi)	13,787 (see note)	19,968	258 m (846 ft)	10.298°S 74.937°W
Villa Rica District	Villa Rica	788 km^{2} (304 sq mi)	14,739	18,763	1,466 m (4,810 ft)	10.735°S 75.268°W
Total: Oxapampa	Oxapampa	18,674 km^{2} (7,210 sq mi)	60,298	96,169	1,812 m (5,945 ft)	

== Places of interest ==
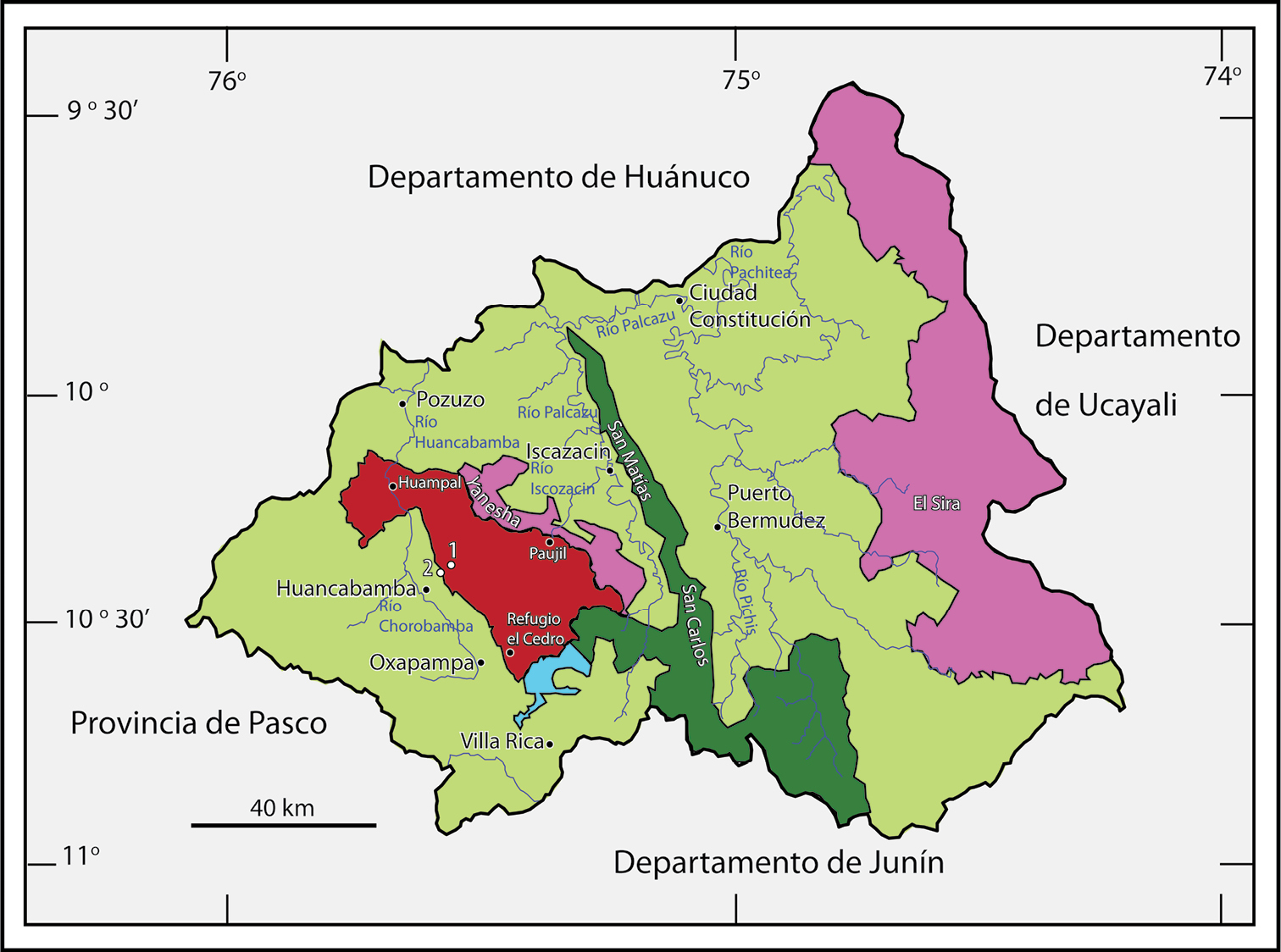
Yanachaga-Chemillén National Park, red; Communal Reserves (Yanesha, El Sira), pink; Protected Forest (San Matías-San Carlos), dark green; Municipal Conservation Area (Bosque de Sho’llet), pale blue, unprotected area, pale green.

- Cerro de la Sal
- El Sira Communal Reserve
- Gran Pajonal
- San Matías–San Carlos Protection Forest
- Yanachaga–Chemillén National Park
- Yanesha Communal Reserve
