= Oxapampa =

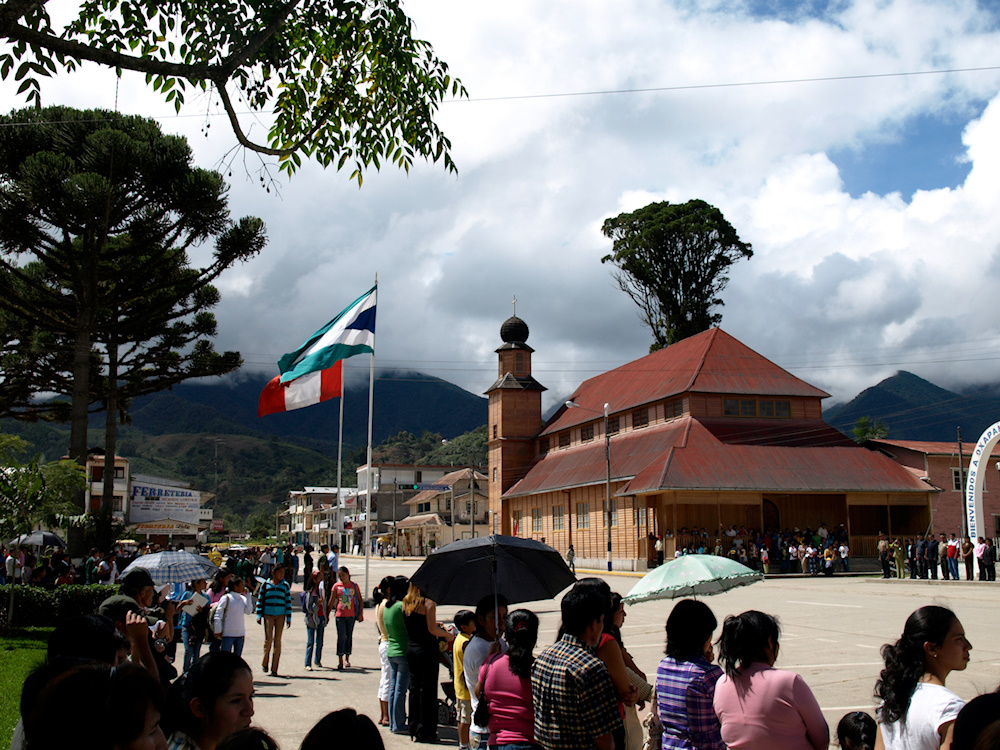

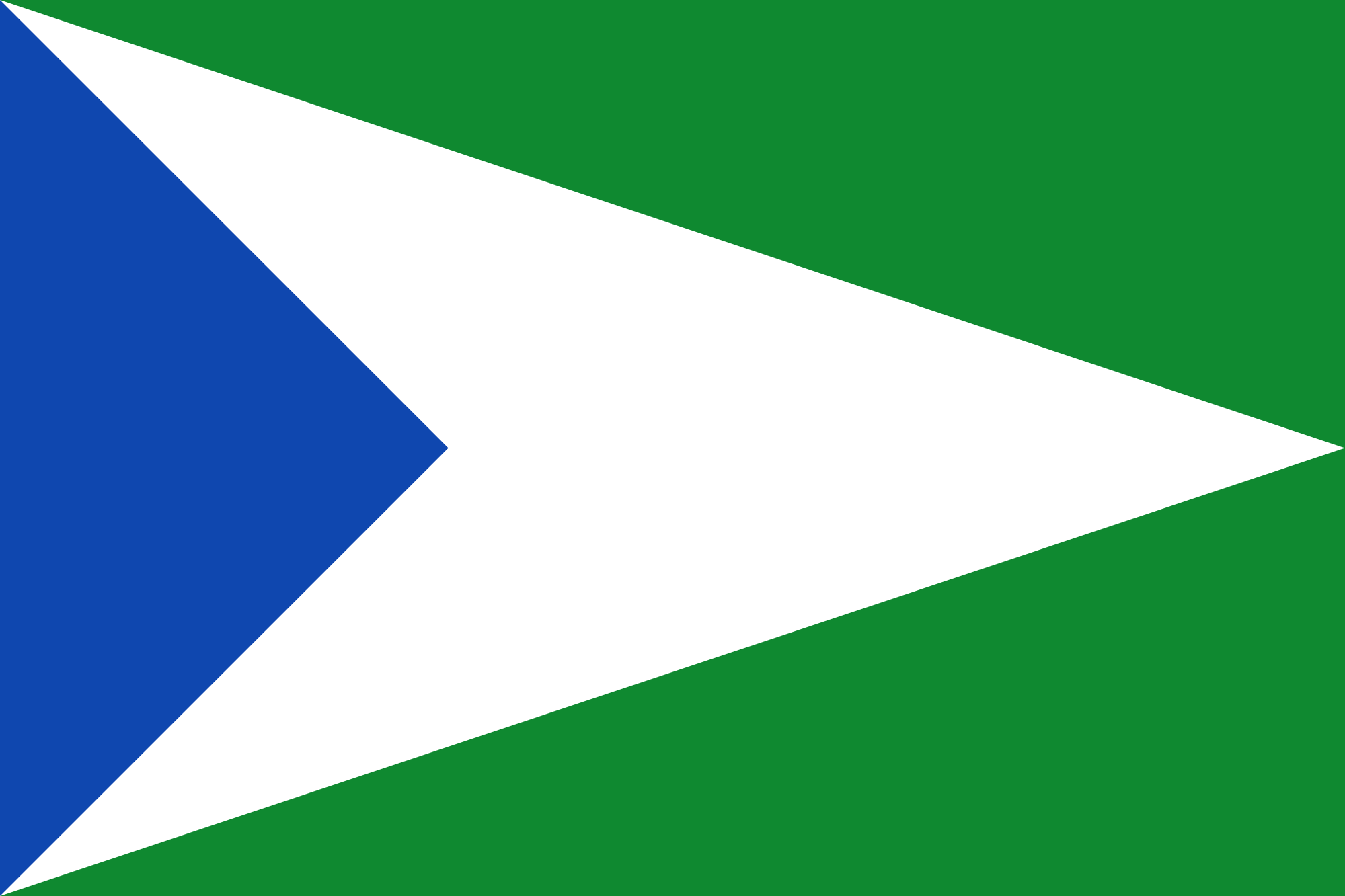
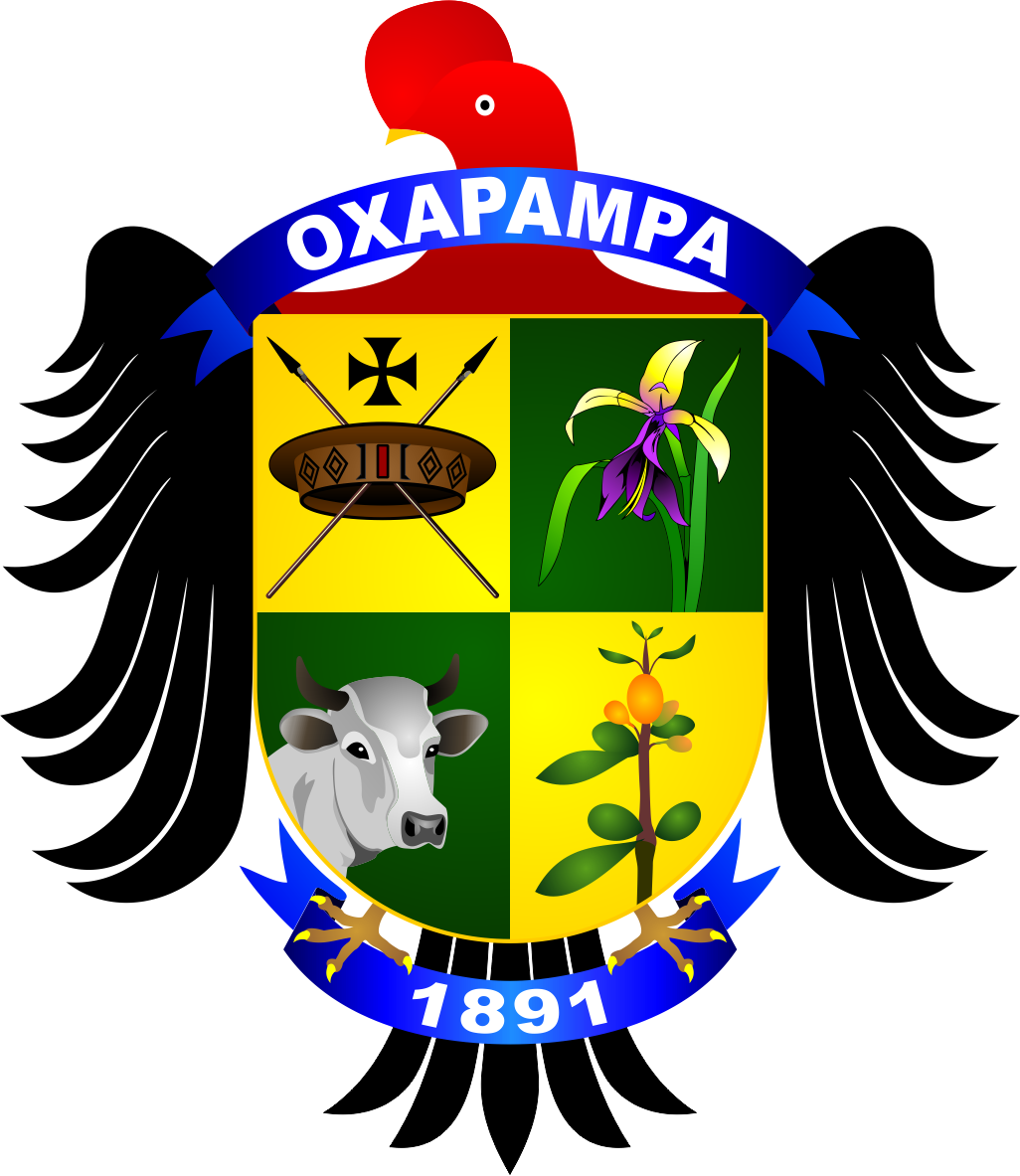
- Flag Coat of arms

- Location in Peru
- Coordinates: 10.574°S 75.405°W
- Country: Peru
- Region: Pasco
- Province: Oxapampa
- District: Oxapampa
- Founded: 1891

Government
  - Mayor: Juan Carlos La Torre Moscoso
- Elevation: 1,814 m (5,951 ft)

Population (2017)
  - Total: 14,304
- Time zone: UTC−5 (PET)

Oxapampa is the capital of Oxapampa District and Oxapampa Province in Peru in the eastern part of the Pasco Region. Oxapampa belongs to the natural region known as Selva Alta or high jungle. 80 kilometres (50 miles) northward down the valley of the Huancabamba River is the settlement of Pozuzo (altitude 800 m). The most important agricultural pursuits in the region are raising cattle and growing coffee.

Oxapampa was founded in 1891 by settlers of Austrian and Germanic origin from Pozuzo. The town and the region retains a Germanic flavor in its Tyrolean architecture and celebrates its origins in public celebrations. Oxapampa, due to its mild climate and scenic surroundings, has become a tourist destination since access was improved by highway construction beginning in the 1980s.

== Etymology ==
Oxapampa comes from the Quechua Uqshapampa, meaning "straw plain" or "grassy plain", where uqsha means "straw" and pampa means "plain" or flat area.

The toponym is Koshapampó in Yanesha'.

== History ==
In March 1857, a group of 300 Tyrolean and Prussian settlers, consisting mainly of poor peasant families and couples who were not allowed to marry in their home countries, boarded the “Norton” to go to Peru. Before starting the journey, the couples were married. After 4 months, the settlers arrived at Callao port in Lima. After two days of quarantine, the settlers took a ship to the port of Huacho, where their belongings were put on mules and men had to continue the journey on foot while women and children were given donkeys to ride on. The journey went from Huacho to Cerro de Pasco, Acobamba and Santa Cruz. On the way, some of the settlers left the group. In 1858, the male settlers travelled from Santa Cruz to Pozuzo to partition the lands and sow enough so they would be able to live off their crops once their families arrived. Finally, in 1859 a group of 170 people moved permanently to Pozuzo.

In 1891, when things were better, a group of colonists from Pozuzo founded the city of Oxapampa (now the capital of the province of same name) and then the town of Villa Rica (both south of Pozuzo).

== Geography ==
=== Climate ===
Oxapama has a Cfb (humid, sub-tropical with warm summers, "eternal spring" ) climate under the Köppen Classification system. Measured by the Trewartha climate classification system the climate is Crlk (humid, subtropical with mild summers and cool winters). Oxapampa's climate is modified by its altitude which results in lower temperatures year round than the nearby low-elevation tropics. The monthly deviation in average temperatures between the hottest and coldest months is only 2.2 °C or 4.0 °F. The austral winter months of June, July, and August are moderately dry, but rain is abundant during the remainder of the year.

Climate data for Oxapampa, elevation 1,801 m (5,909 ft), (1991–2020)
Month	Jan	Feb	Mar	Apr	May	Jun	Jul	Aug	Sep	Oct	Nov	Dec	Year
Mean daily maximum °C (°F)	23.0 (73.4)	22.8 (73.0)	23.1 (73.6)	23.4 (74.1)	23.2 (73.8)	22.9 (73.2)	22.9 (73.2)	23.6 (74.5)	23.9 (75.0)	24.0 (75.2)	24.0 (75.2)	23.2 (73.8)	23.3 (74.0)
Daily mean °C (°F)	18.5 (65.3)	18.5 (65.3)	18.4 (65.1)	18.3 (64.9)	18.0 (64.4)	17.4 (63.3)	17.0 (62.6)	17.3 (63.1)	17.6 (63.7)	18.4 (65.1)	18.7 (65.7)	18.6 (65.5)	18.1 (64.5)
Mean daily minimum °C (°F)	14.0 (57.2)	14.1 (57.4)	13.7 (56.7)	13.1 (55.6)	12.7 (54.9)	11.8 (53.2)	11.0 (51.8)	11.0 (51.8)	11.2 (52.2)	12.7 (54.9)	13.3 (55.9)	13.9 (57.0)	12.7 (54.9)
Average precipitation mm (inches)	203.0 (7.99)	223.4 (8.80)	194.4 (7.65)	96.2 (3.79)	48.7 (1.92)	30.9 (1.22)	36.1 (1.42)	42.1 (1.66)	55.8 (2.20)	108.4 (4.27)	114.9 (4.52)	195.9 (7.71)	1,349.8 (53.15)
Source: National Meteorology and Hydrology Service of Peru

== Gallery ==
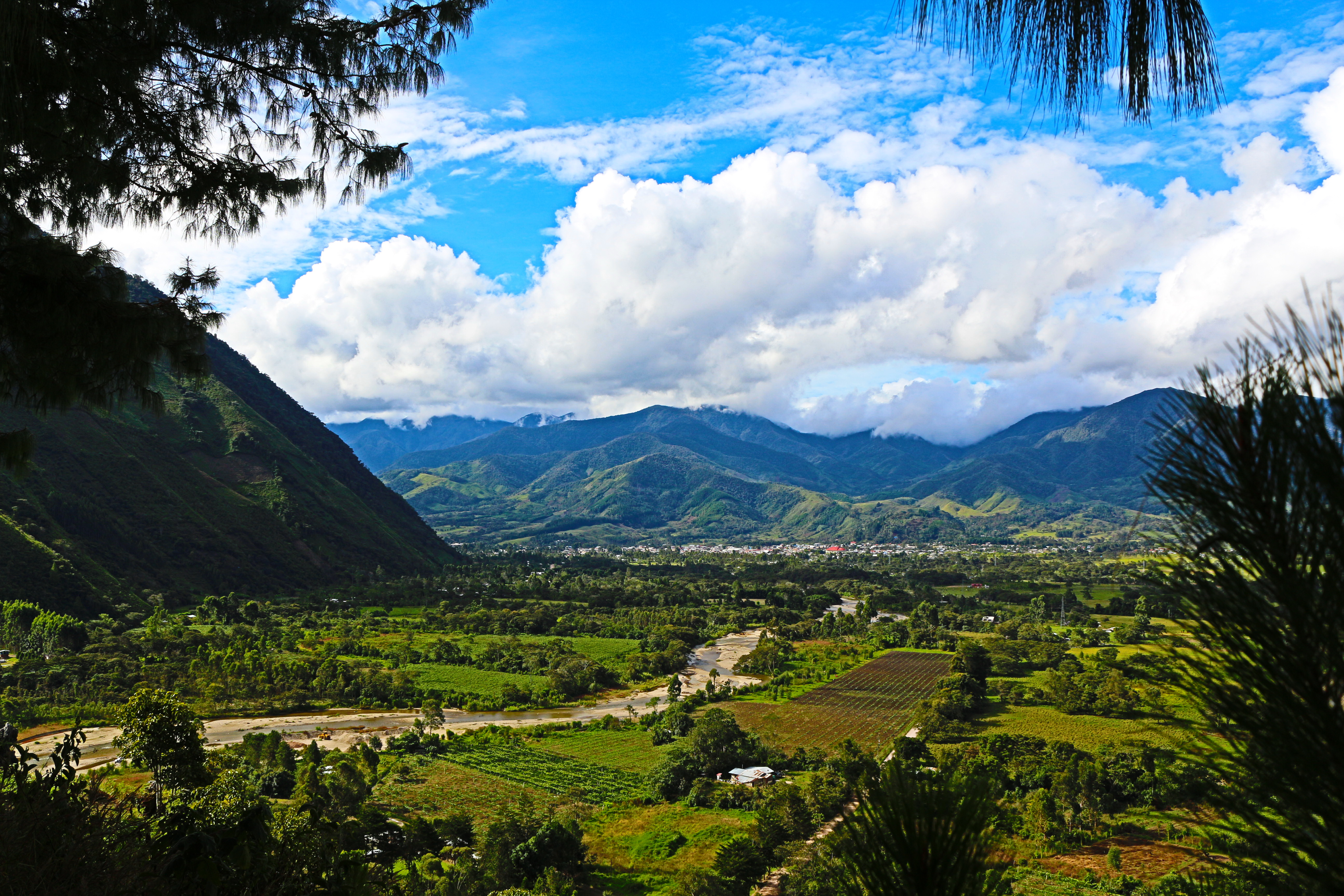
Oxapampa valley with the town in the distance.

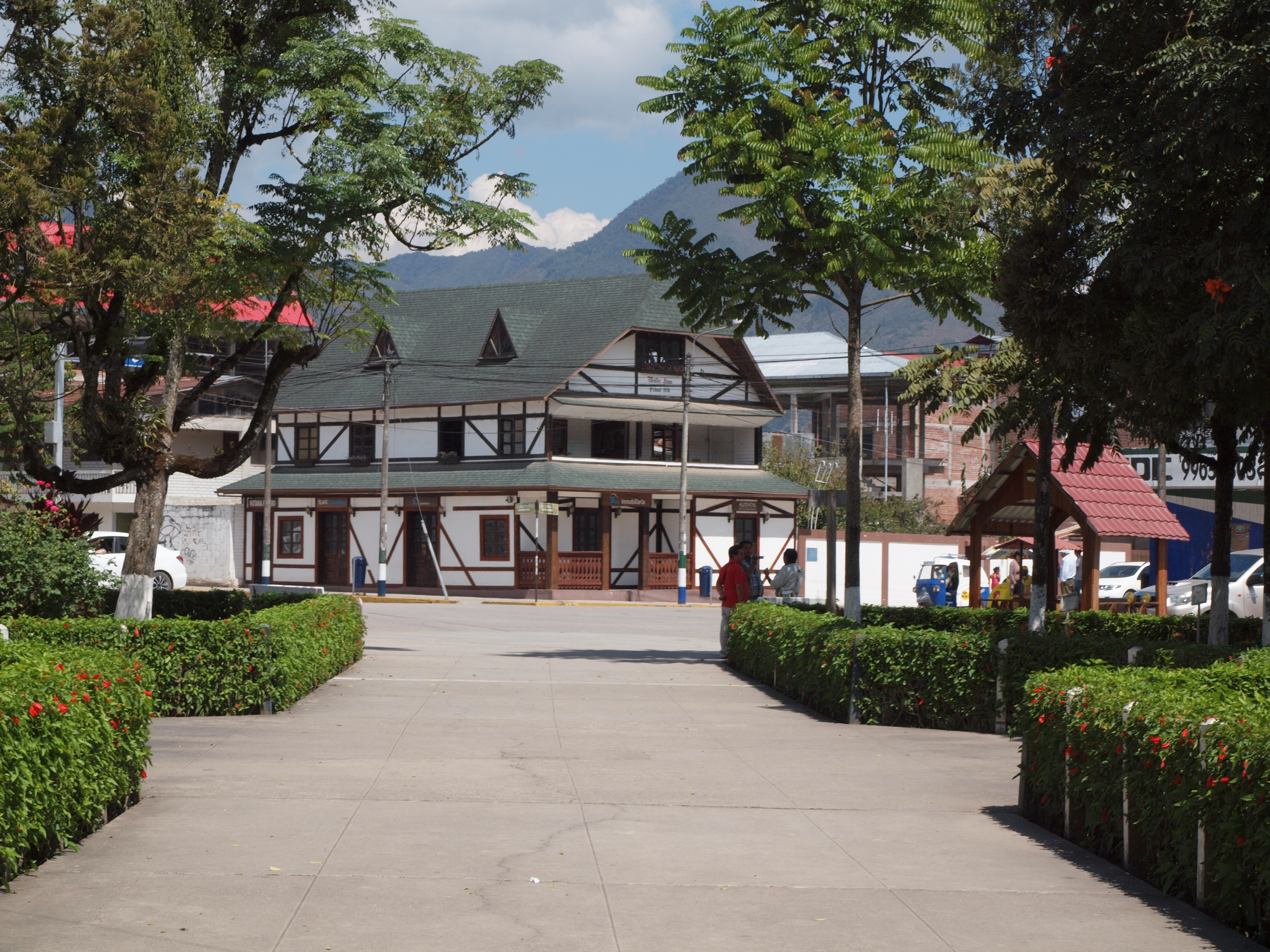
The main plaza

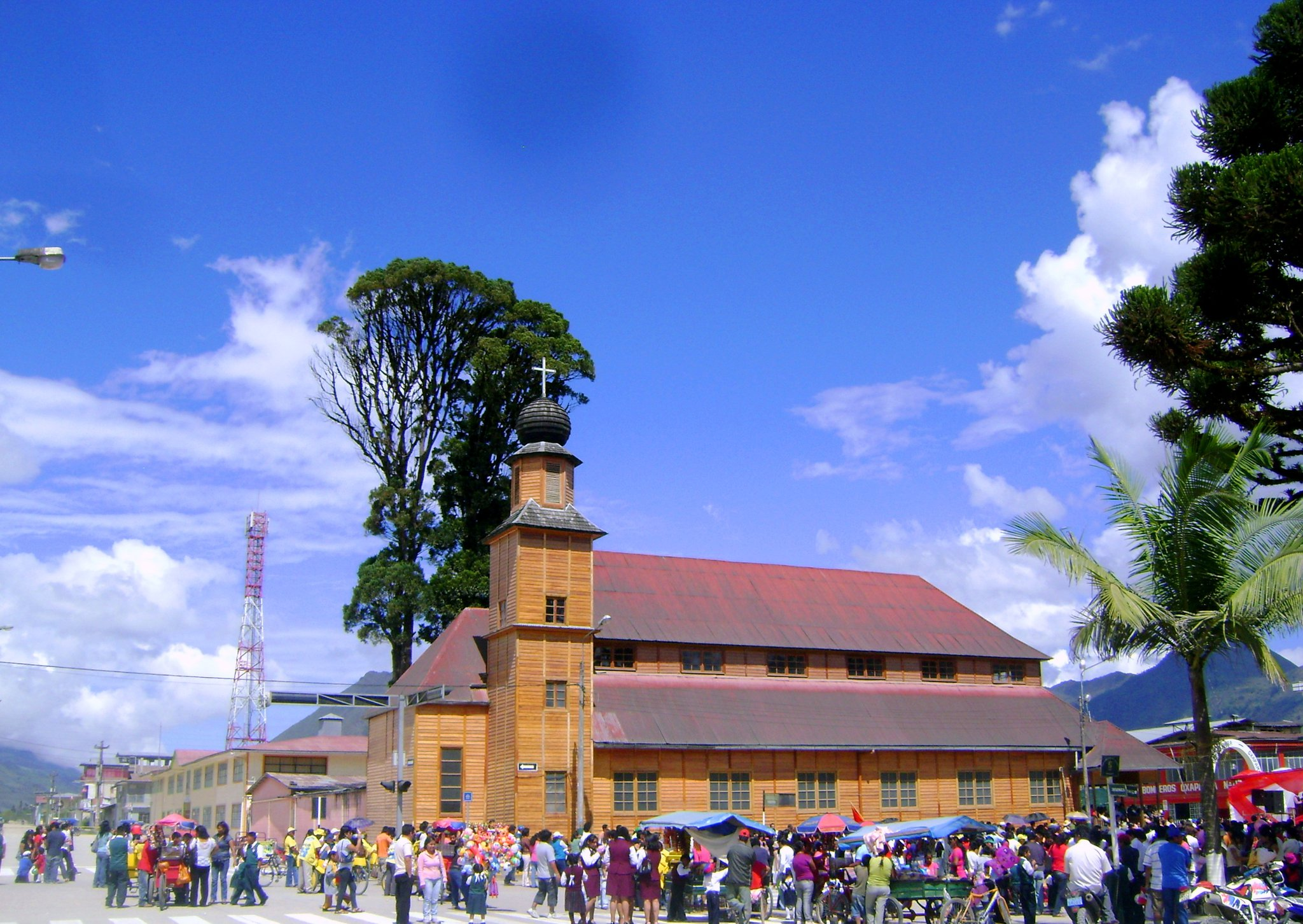
The church on the main plaza.

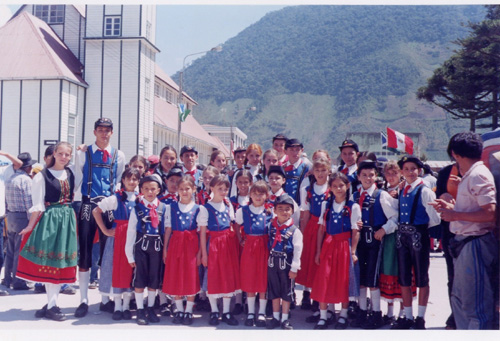
Celebrating their German heritage.

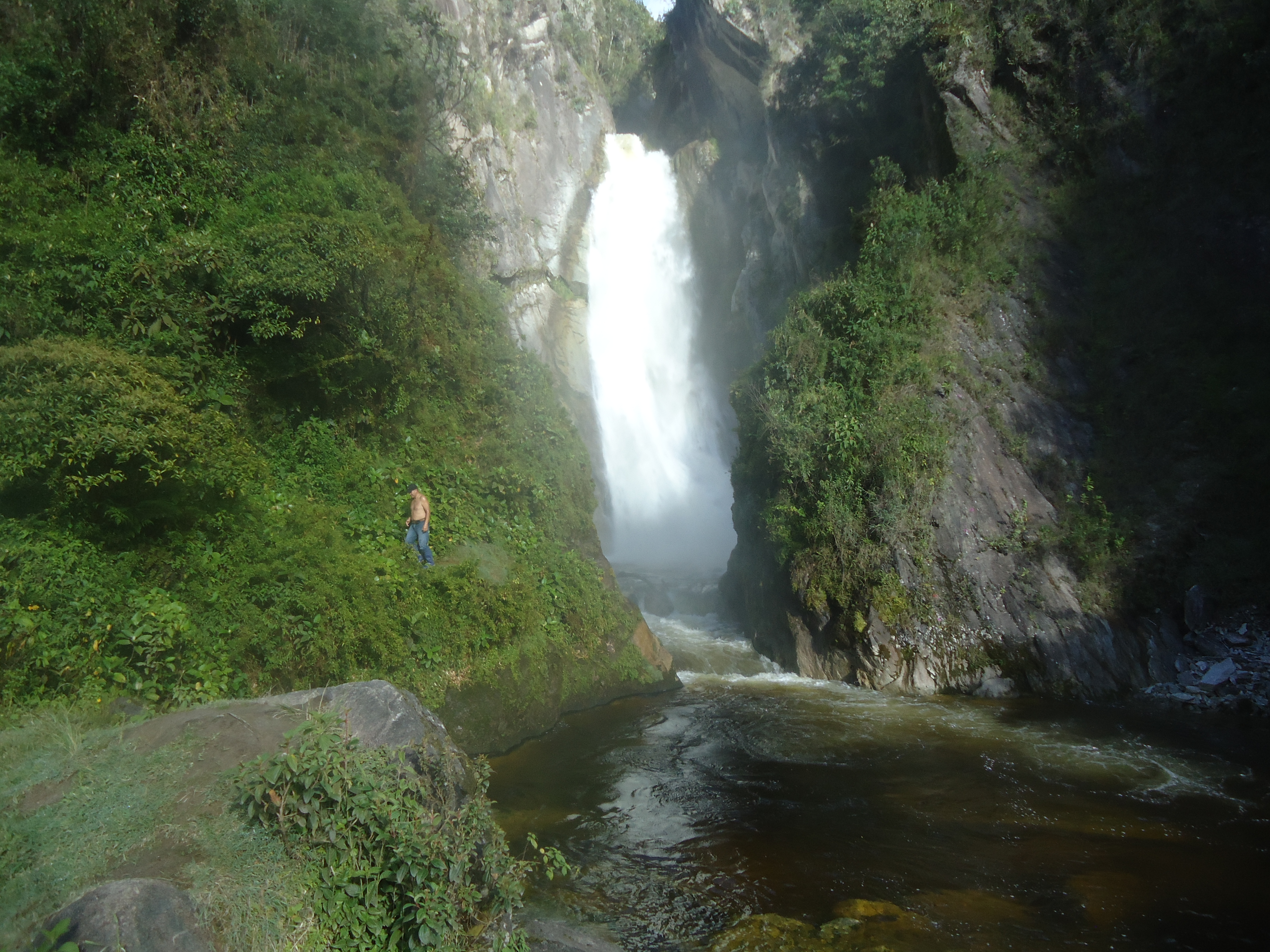
Anana waterfall

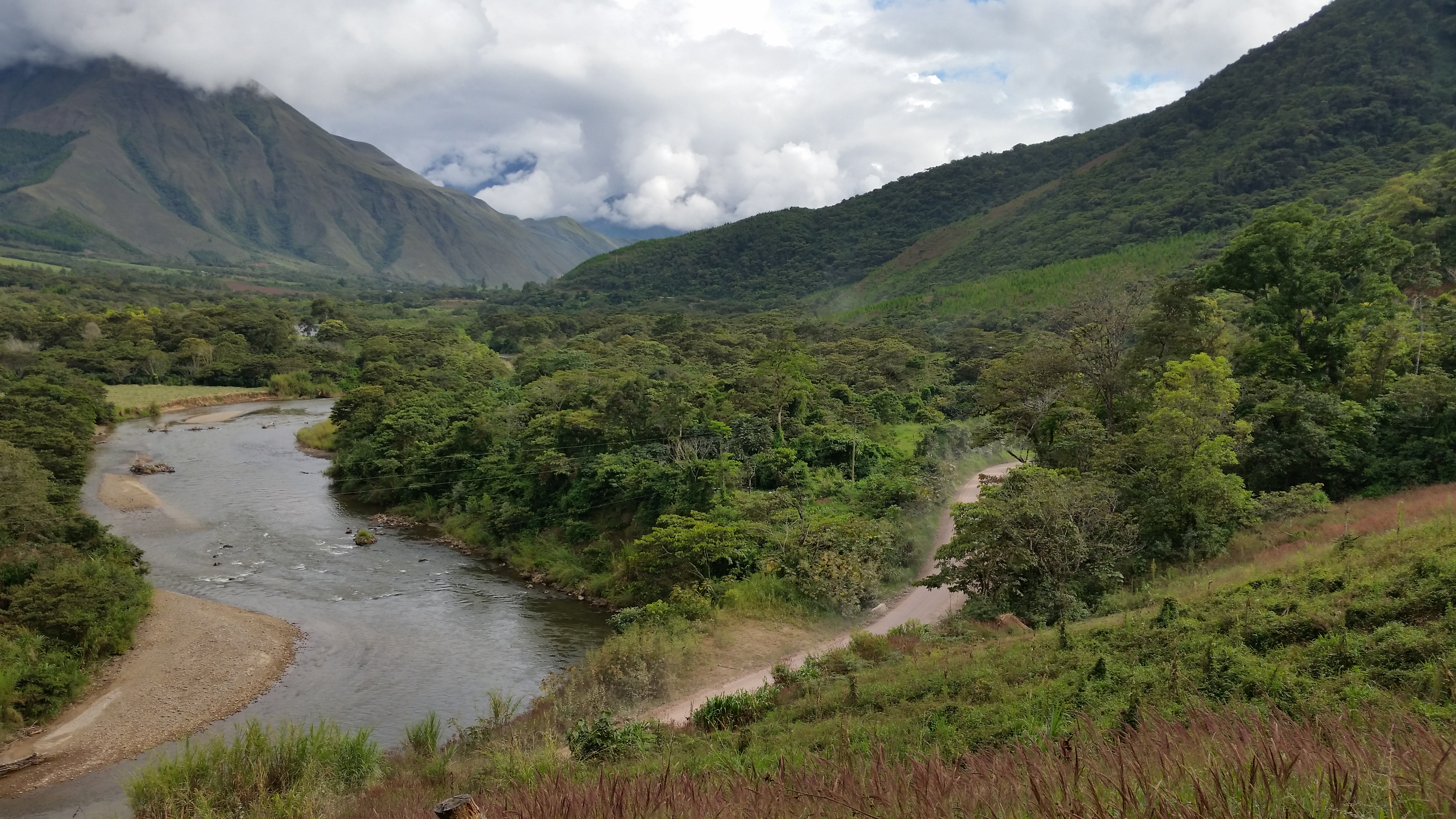
Huancabamba River, near Oxapampa.
