= Palcazu River =

Palcazu
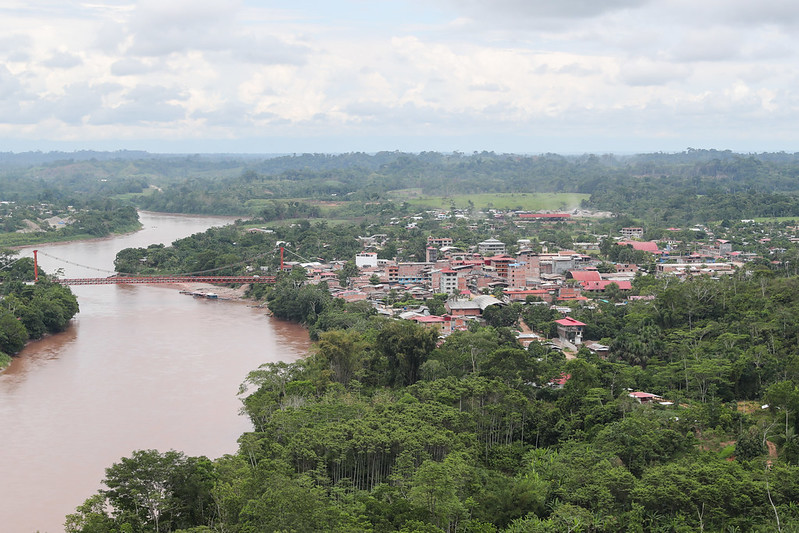

Location
- Country: Peru
- Region: Pasco Region

Physical characteristics
- Mouth: Pachitea River

The Palcazu River is a river in Peru. It originates at the confluence of the Bocaz and Cacazú rivers which are born in the mountains of the mountain range of San Carlos. It flows to Pachitea River.

The Palcazu has a length of 182 km, draining an area of 3337 km^{2} and a flow of 2892.5 m^{3}/s. It belongs to the rivers of longitudinal type, that is to say that passes parallel to the structure of the rocks. Its breadth reaches a maximum of 300 m.

The Palcazu valley is occupied by native people called the Amuesha Indians.
