= Department of Pasco =

Department of Peru

Pasco Pasqu (Quechua)
- Department
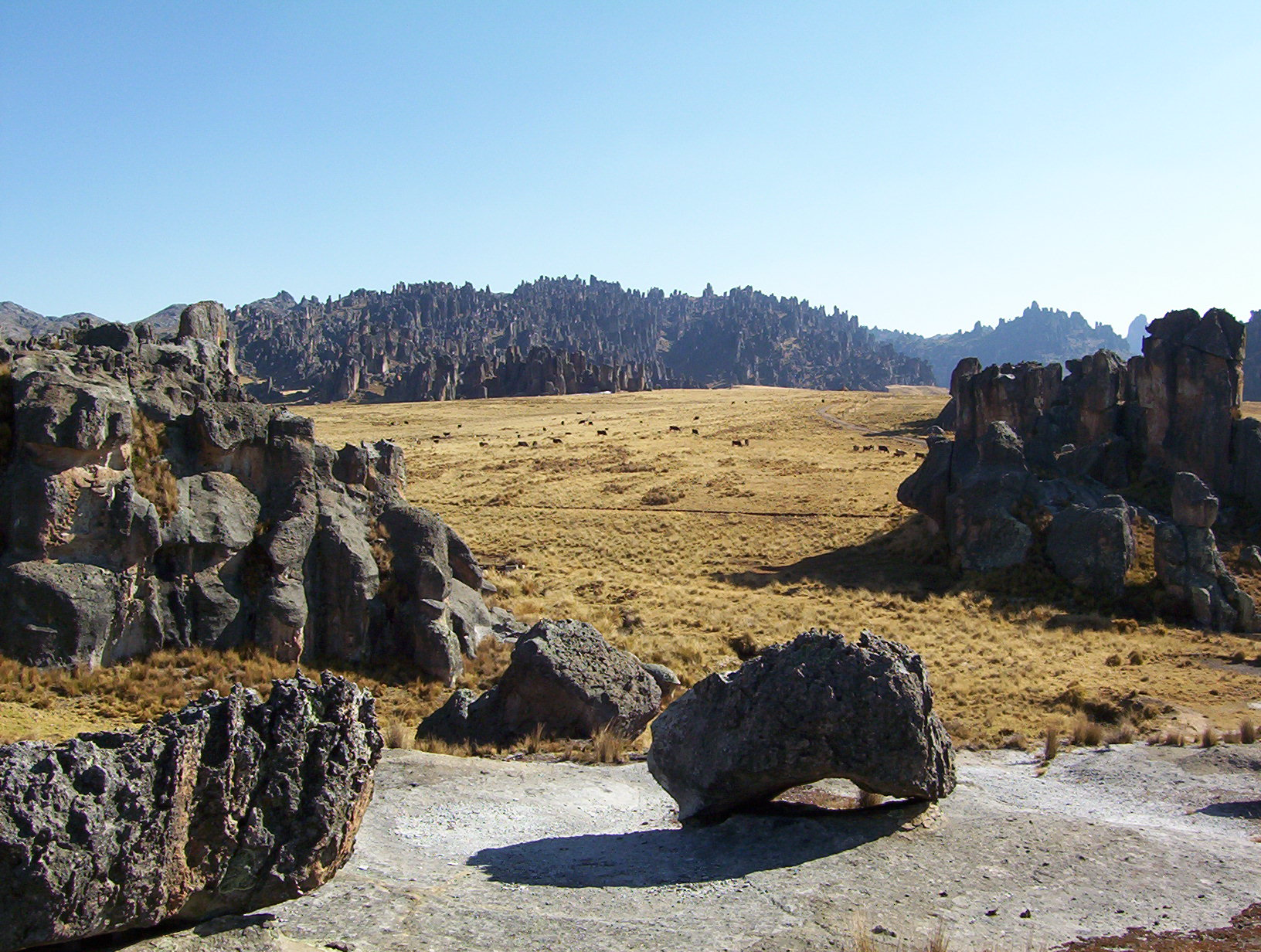

- Flag Coat of arms

- Location of Pasco within Peru
- Coordinates: 10.5°S 75.3°W
- Country: Peru
- Capital: Cerro de Pasco
- Provinces: List: Daniel Alcides Carrión; Oxapampa; Pasco

Government
  - Type: Regional Government
  - Governor: Pedro Ubaldo Polinar

Area
  - Total: 25,319.59 km^{2} (9,775.95 sq mi)
- Highest elevation: 4,380 m (14,370 ft)
- Lowest elevation: 256 m (840 ft)

Population (2025)
  - Total: 253,223
  - Density: 10.0011/km^{2} (25.9027/sq mi)
- Demonym: pasqueño/a
- UBIGEO: 19
- Dialing code: 063
- ISO 3166 code: PE-PAS
- Principal resources: Lead, zinc, silver and coal.
- Percentage of Peru's GDP: 1.04%
- Website: www.regionpasco.gob.pe

Pasco (Spanish pronunciation: [ˈpasko]; Quechua: Pasqu) is a department of Peru. It is located in the country's central highlands. It is administered by a regional government. Its capital is Cerro de Pasco.

== Political division ==
Map of provinces

The region is divided into 3 provinces (Spanish: provincias, singular: provincia), which are composed of 28 districts (distritos, singular: distrito).

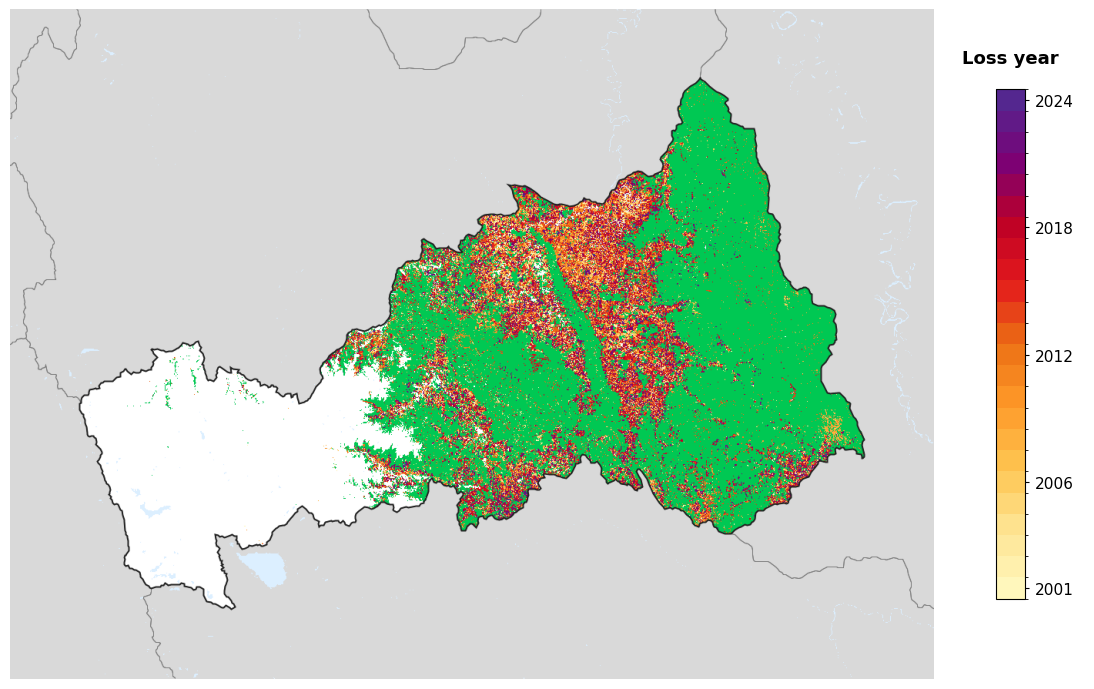
Tree-cover loss year in Pasco, 2001-2024, from the Global Forest Change dataset.

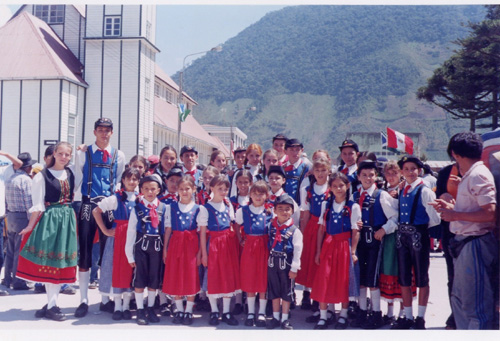
Celebration in Oxapampa.

=== Provinces ===
The provinces, with their capitals in parentheses, are:

- Daniel Alcídes Carrión (Yanahuanca)
- Oxapampa (Oxapampa)
- Pasco (Cerro de Pasco)

== Places of interest ==
- Cerro de la Sal
- El Sira Communal Reserve
- Gran Pajonal
- San Matías–San Carlos Protection Forest
- Yanachaga–Chemillén National Park
- Yanesha Communal Reserve
