= Chanchamayo =

Chanchamayo (Hispanicized spelling) or Chanchamayu (Quechua chanchay to walk and leap about, to walk quickly and confused, mayu river) may refer to:

- Chanchamayo River, Junín Region, Peru
- Chanchamayo, Junín, the capital of the Chanchamayo Province in Peru
- Chanchamayo District, a district in the Chanchamayo Province, Junín Region, Peru
- Chanchamayo Province, one of nine provinces in the Junín Region in Central Peru
- Chanchamayo (Coffee), an Arabica-coffee that is grown in Monteseco in Northern Peru
