= Mariano Gagnon =

American missionary and author

The Reverend Mariano Gagnon OFM
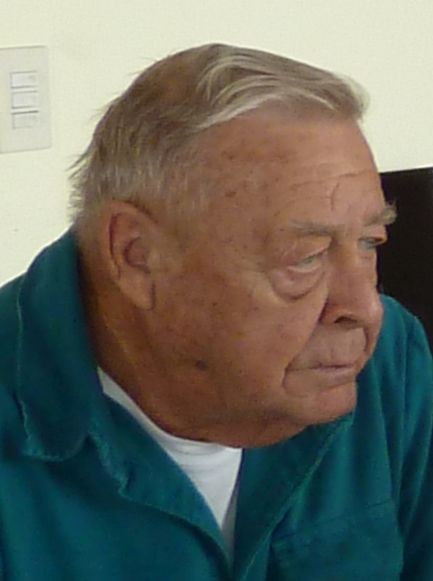
- Gagnon in 2010
- Born: Joseph Theodore Gagnon; October 7, 1929; Manchester, New Hampshire, U.S.
- Died: April 28, 2017 (aged 87); Lima, Peru
- Other name: Joseph Theodore Gangon
- Occupations: Priest; missionary

Ecclesiastical career
- Church: Catholic Church
- Ordained: 1957
- Writings: Warriors in Eden

Mariano Gagnon OFM (born Joseph Theodore Gagnon; October 7, 1929 – April 28, 2017) was an American Franciscan friar and Catholic priest, who served as a missionary in Peru. Gagnon founded the Cutivereni mission in Peru's Ene River valley to assist the indigenous Asháninka people who were being forced out of their homes in the jungle by settlers. He would later become known for his work helping arm the Asháninka and eventually helping some Asháninka flee Cutivereni when it was facing attack from Shining Path guerrillas during the internal conflict in Peru. He later wrote about his experiences during the conflict in the book Warriors in Eden.

== Early life and priesthood ==
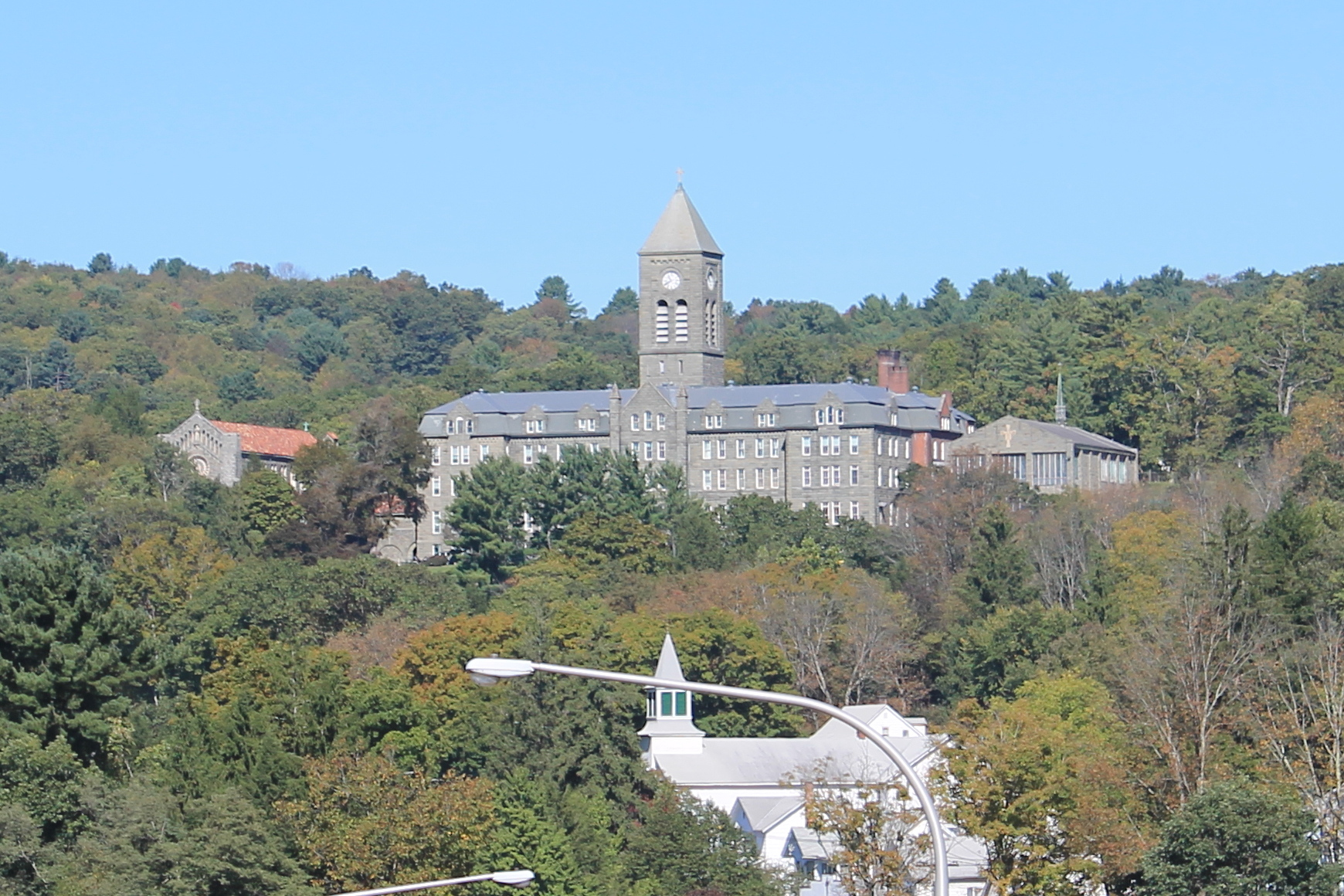
St. Joseph's Seraphic Seminary, Callicoon, New York

Joseph Theodore Gagnon was born on October 7, 1929, to a Métis father and a French-Canadian mother. He grew up in New Hampshire and was raised Catholic. He completed his high school education and then studied at St. Joseph's Seraphic Seminary, a Franciscan minor seminary in Callicoon, New York.

Gagnon's fascination with Peru and the Asháninka began after World War II, when he heard a bishop give a talk about them. He then worked for three years in a shoe factory and restaurant in New Hampshire to save money to allow him to visit Lima. In 1948, he came to Peru, entered the Franciscan order, and took the name Mariano. Gagnon was ordained a priest in 1957, and spent three years working with those who spoke Cocama, an indigenous language of Peru. He said of the people that he served, "They are the most virtuous people I have ever met. They never lie and have great respect for personal property. Their language is very sharp. There is no word for 'maybe' in Campa." He also observed that they did not chew coca leaves and were not prone to sharing food and drink, which had been a major cause of rampant tuberculosis. There was also a high infant mortality rate. By 1969, he had established two missions and began work on a third.

== Cutivereni mission ==
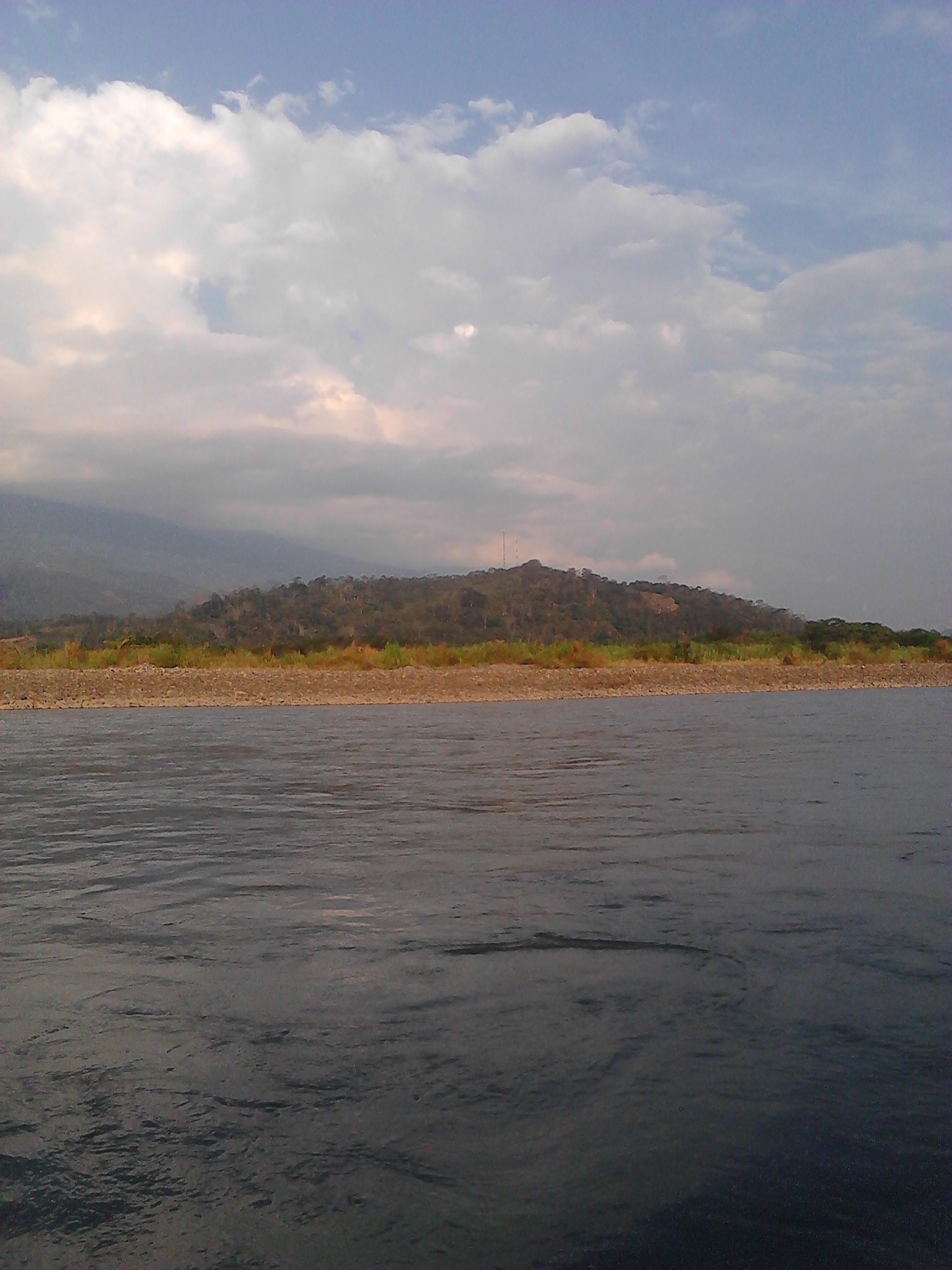
Gagnon worked near the Ene River in the Peruvian Amazon to help protect individuals who were losing their land to settlers

In 1969, he founded a mission to work with the Asháninka due to deforestation caused by settlers. He maintained the Cutivereni (alternate spelling Cutivireni) mission of the Ene River parish in the Peruvian Amazon, southeast of Satipo. Cutivereni was a hub for 5,000 Asháninkas who lived in the area. The mission, located at the confluence of three rivers, had 91 buildings and housed 700 people. The mission was equipped with a plaza, a chapel, a generator building, an infirmary, a bilingual school, workshops, and a landing strip. The Asháninka hunted, and farmed manioc other foods. They also grew cacao, a cash-crop.

The indigenous people lived on their traditional lands until the 1950s, when settlers began encroaching. Gagnon found them to be "free from pretension, ostentation or calculation. Obviously, these uncommon virtues in a modern society make them victim to many abuses." Partly due to his efforts, the Cutivireni land was protected from settlement by others; it was the only land of the Asháninka people to be preserved. Although he taught modern technology and facilitated Spanish lessons with the Summer Linguistics Institute, a Protestant organization, for the indigenous people, he did not try to change aspects of their culture, like polygamy or women going topless.

The Ashaninkas were pressured to begin growing coca as cocaine trafficking increased in Peru by the early 1980s. Gagnon said that he would leave the mission if the people entered the cocaine trade, and no one chose to change their way of life. As the trade grew in the area, though, Gagnon talked to a United States Drug Enforcement Administration agent and sent a letter to the Peruvian security police base commander in Mazamari in 1983. Gagnon was told, and heeded the advice of two drug traffickers, not make any further overtures about the cocaine trade.

== Internal conflict in Peru ==
Location of the Cutivireni mission and places Gagnon visited during the Peruvian conflict

In 1980 the Communist Party of Peru, known as the Shining Path, launched an insurgency against the government of Peru. This conflict followed Maoist tactics of guerrilla warfare. In 1983, Gagnon met with members of the Peruvian government to let them know about the difficulties in Cutivireni. While he was meeting with authorities in Lima, members of the Shining Path burned down the mission and threatened that they would kill him if he came back in May 1984. The Franciscans who were working with the Asháninka did not have a coordinated strategy to provide for their defense, but Gagnon was able to secure weapons from the Peruvian army, and approached the United States military for support as well.

Gagnon began rebuilding the mission and it was complete in 1988. In June 1989 members of the Shining Path arrived at the mission and demanded supplies. Gagnon's mission paid a tax to them of writing supplies during this period. In November 1989, the Shining Path once again assaulted the mission and burned the buildings. while Gagnon was in the United States. Two mission leaders and two schoolteachers were killed by the guerillas, and a war broke out between the people at Cutivireni and the Shining Path fighters. Gagnon returned to Peru, staying in Satipo and attempting to visit on December 26. Warned not to land, he dropped Christmas presents and salt from the plane. There continued to be casualties on both sides.

In April 1990, he arranged for several hundred Asháninka to make a five-day trek from the central highlands into the mountains of Peru at Tzibokiroato. (Note: Pronounced tzhee-bo-kir-WAT-oh) During this time period, he was recalled by his religious superiors to Lima, where they questioned his arming the Asháninka, because of the view that the Catholic Church should not use violence. Gagnon responded that the Church had resorted to the use of violence in the past, and should not be hypocritical.

In September 1990, the village that they had built of houses in the remote location was surrounded and attacked by guerillas of the Shining Path while Gagnon was in Lima strategizing with others on ways to protect the indigenous people from being killed, enslaved, or indoctrinated. The Asháninka escaped, but the Shining Path captured their village. Gagnon arranged for 213 Asháninka to be taken to a Dominican mission in Urubamba. He arranged 20 airlifts to transport the refugees approximately 150 miles to safety. On September 22, 1990, after the Asháninka were safe with the Dominicans, Gagnon left the indigenous people and his mission. (Note: By 1993, there were 900 Asháninka (of 50,000 in South America) and 80 soldiers living at Cutivireni, the surrounding forests of which were controlled by the Shining Path.)

== Author ==
Gagnon documented his experiences with co-authors Marilyn and William Hoffer. He lived in Bowling Green, Virginia, outside of Richmond, when he wrote the book and into 1995.

- Warriors in Eden. William Morrow & Co. 1993. ISBN 0-688-11796-1.
- Les Guerriers du Paradis (in French). Fixot. 1994. ISBN 2-87645-189-1. (translation)
- Guerreros en el Paraiso (in Spanish). Liam, Peru: Coleccion del Sol Blanco. 2000. (translation)

== Later years ==
Gagnon celebrated his 50th year as a priest in 2007. He shared his time at the Mateo Pumacahua Friary in south Lima and in the jungle near Satipo by 2008. He served at San Ramón, Peru, when he received an award on May 8, 2014, from the government of Peru, which he had been nominated for by Father Eduardo Arens. Anthony Wilson, OFM said, "Many referred to Mariano as a modern-day hero for his work during the time of terrorism in the Peruvian Amazon." Gagnon celebrated his 60th year as a friar in 2011 and 60th year ordained in 2017. Gagnon died on April 28, 2017, at 87 years old.

== In popular culture ==
- Gagnon was among the cast of Burden of Dreams, a documentary released in 1982.
