= Chanchamayo District =

Coordinates: 10.9206°S 75.1746°W

Chanchamayo Chanchamayu
- District
- Flag

- Location of Chanchamayo in the Chanchamayo province
- Country: Peru
- Region: Junín
- Province: Chanchamayo
- Founded: December 31, 1855
- Capital: Chanchamayo (La Merced)

Area
  - Total: 919.72 km^{2} (355.11 sq mi)
- Elevation: 751 m (2,464 ft)

Population (2005 census)
  - Total: 25,565
  - Density: 27.797/km^{2} (71.993/sq mi)
- Time zone: UTC-5 (PET)
- UBIGEO: 120301
- Website: munichanchamayo.gob.pe

Chanchamayo District is one of six districts of the province Chanchamayo in Peru. Its capital city is La Merced.

== See also ==
- Kuntur Muyunan
- Pampa Hermosa Reserved Zone
