= San Luis de Shuaro District =

Coordinates: 10.8879°S 75.2879°W

San Luis de Shuaro
- District
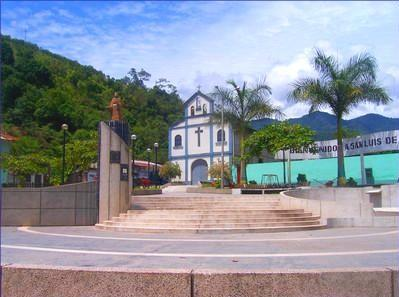
- San Luis

- Location of San Luis de Shuaro in the Chanchamayo province
- Country: Peru
- Region: Junín
- Province: Chanchamayo
- Founded: September 24, 1977
- Capital: San Luis de Shuaro

Government
  - Mayor: Luis Meza Reyes

Area
  - Total: 177.41 km^{2} (68.50 sq mi)
- Elevation: 721 m (2,365 ft)

Population (2005 census)
  - Total: 7,193
  - Density: 40.54/km^{2} (105.0/sq mi)
- Time zone: UTC-5 (PET)
- UBIGEO: 120304

San Luis de Shuaro District is one of six districts of the province Chanchamayo in Peru.
