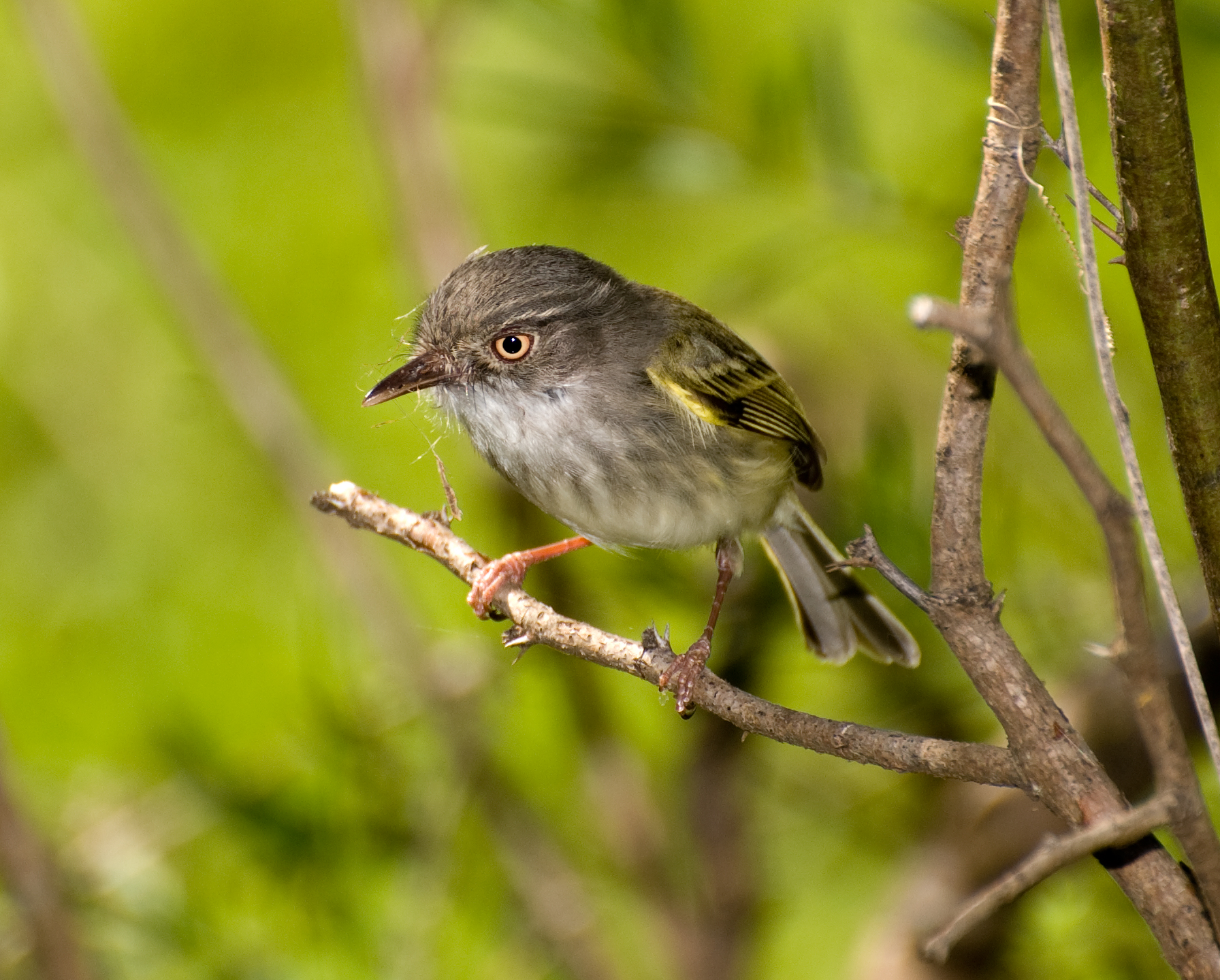
- in Uruguay

Conservation status
- Least Concern (IUCN 3.1)

Scientific classification
- Kingdom: Animalia
- Phylum: Chordata
- Class: Aves
- Order: Passeriformes
- Family: Tyrannidae
- Genus: Hemitriccus
- Species: H. margaritaceiventer

Binomial name
- Hemitriccus margaritaceiventer (D'Orbigny & Lafresnaye, 1837)

= Pearly-vented tody-tyrant =

Species of bird

The pearly-vented tody-tyrant (Hemitriccus margaritaceiventer) is a species of bird in the family Tyrannidae, the tyrant flycatchers. It is found in every mainland South American country except Chile, Ecuador, French Guiana, and Suriname.

== Taxonomy and systematics ==
The pearly-vented tody-tyrant has a complicated taxonomic history. It was originally described in 1837 as Todirostrum margaritacei venter. At various times since then it has been placed in genera Euscarthmornis and Idioptilon, both of which were eventually merged into Hemitriccus.

The pearly-vented tody-tyrant has these nine subspecies:

- H. m. impiger (Sclater, PL & Salvin, 1868)
- H. m. septentrionalis (Chapman, 1914)
- H. m. chiribiquetensis Stiles, 1995
- H. m. duidae (Chapman, 1929)
- H. m. auyantepui (Gilliard, 1941)
- H. m. breweri (Phelps, WH Jr, 1977)
- H. m. rufipes (Tschudi, 1844)
- H. m. margaritaceiventer (D'Orbigny & Lafresnaye, 1837)
- H. m. wuchereri (Sclater, PL & Salvin, 1873)

What is now Pelzeln's tody-tyrant (H. inornatus) was previously treated as a subspecies of the pearly-vented tody-tyrant.

== Description ==
The pearly-vented tody-tyrant is about 10 to 11 cm (3.9 to 4.3 in) long and weighs 7 to 10 g (0.25 to 0.35 oz). The sexes have the same plumage. Adults of the nominate subspecies H. m. margaritaceiventer have a gray crown. Their lores and eye-ring are whitish on an otherwise grayish brown face. Their back and rump are drab grayish brown to brownish olive. Their wings are dusky with buff whitish to yellow edges on the flight feathers and tips of the coverts; the latter show as two wing bars. Their tail is dusky. Their throat and underparts are white with some faint grayish streaking. They have a pale iris, a reddish brown to blackish maxilla, a pinkish brown to pinkish mandible, and pink to pale grayish pink legs and feet.

The other subspecies of the pearly-vented tody-tyrant differ from the nominate and each other thus:

- H. m. impiger: deep buff-brown crown and upper back
- H. m. septentrionalis: grayer upperparts and blacker bill than nominate
- H. m. chiribiquetensis: much grayer upperparts than nominate, with darker crown, paler and more contrasting wing bars, blacker and more obvious streaks on throat, yellow tinge on flanks, and blacker bill
- H. m. duidae: dark brown upperparts, buffy to pale orange-yellow belly, and reddish bill
- H. m. auyantepui: medium brown upperparts with slight olivaceous tinge
- H. m. breweri: darker than nominate with pale ochraceous-buff belly
- H. m. rufipes: olivaceous tinge on crown; yellower flanks and crissum than nominate
- H. m. wuchereri: much less greenish back and more distinctly streaked throat than nominate

== Distribution and habitat ==
The pearly-vented tody-tyrant has an extremely disjunct distribution. The subspecies are found thus:

- H. m. impiger: north-central Colombia between Magdalena and Santander departments; northern Venezuela from Zulia east to Sucre and on Margarita Island
- H. m. septentrionalis: upper Magdalena River valley in central Colombia
- H. m. chiribiquetensis: Sierra de Chiribiquete in southern Colombia's Caquetá Department
- H. m. duidae: the tepui Cerro Duida in southern Venezuela's Amazonas state
- H. m. auyantepui: tepuis Cerros Sororopán and Urutaní in southeastern Venezuela's Bolívar state
- H. m. breweri: Cerro Jaua in Bolívar
- H. m. rufipes: valleys of the Mayo, Huallaga, Chanchamayo, and upper Urubamba rivers in central to southern Peru; La Paz and Beni departments in Bolivia
- H. m. margaritaceiventer: eastern and southeastern Bolivia; most of Paraguay; northeastern Argentina south to Córdoba and Entre Ríos provinces; extreme northern Uruguay; and east-central and southern Brazil from Peru and Paraguay east to western Minas Gerais and south to western Rio Grande do Sul
- H. m. wuchereri: northeastern Brazil from Maranhão and Bahia east to the Atlantic

The pearly-vented tody-tyrant inhabits a variety of landscapes, many of them shrubby and dry. In Brazil it is found in arid scrub, shrubby pastures, the undergrowth of deciduous woodlands, and sometimes in gallery forest. Further south it tends to favor the edges of forest and woodlands. In Peru it inhabits "second-growth scrub and shrubby forest edge [and] perhaps locally also in low dry forest". Similarly in Colombia it is found in the undergrowth of dry woodland and in scrubby areas. In Venezuela it mostly occurs "in thickets, arid scrub, and dry deciduous woodland" and occasionally in the edges of moister woodland. In the Gran Sabana of Bolívar it is found in dense heathlands. In elevation the species ranges in Brazil mostly from sea level to 1,000 m (3,300 ft) and occasionally much higher, and in Colombia up to 1,100 m (3,600 ft). In Peru it ranges between 600 and 1,600 m (2,000 and 5,200 ft) in the Chanchamayo Valley, between about 1,000 and 1,100 m (3,300 and 3,600 ft) in the Urubamba Valley, and up to 1,000 m (3,300 ft) in the Mayo and Huallaga valleys. In Venezuela it ranges from sea level to 1,000 m (3,300 ft) north of the Orinoco River and between about 1,000 and 2,000 m (3,300 and 6,600 ft) in the rest of the country.

== Behavior ==
=== Movement ===
The pearly-vented tody-tyrant is a year-round resident.

=== Feeding ===
The pearly-vented tody-tyrant feeds on insects. It typically forages singly, more usually in pairs, and is not known to join mixed-species feeding flocks. It mostly forages from just above the ground to about eye level though sometimes higher. It mostly takes prey using short upward sallies from a perch to grab it from the underside of leaves but also by gleaning while perched and in mid-air with a short flight.

=== Breeding ===
The pearly-vented tody-tyrant's breeding season varies geographically. It nests between January and June in Colombia and between October and December in Peru, Bolivia, and Argentina. Its nest is a domed "purse" with a side entrance near the bottom, made from dry grass and thin plant fibers lined with plant down. It is typically suspended from a branch in a tree or shrub between about 0.5 and 3 m (2 and 10 ft) above the ground. The usual clutch size is two eggs though clutches of one and three are known. Fledging occurs 13 to 14 days after hatch. The incubation period and details of parental care are not known.

=== Vocalization ===
Though recordings of some subspecies are lacking, the pearly-vented tody-tyrant's vocalizations appear to be similar across its range. Its song has been described as a "modest, soft yet emphasized series...'tuc-tic-tuc-tuc-tuc-tuc' ". Other descriptions are "tip...tip...tiptrrtrrrrr", "tup tchup tchip ti-teeeeeerrrr", and "stick, tic-tic-ter'r'r'r'r'r'r'r'r'r'r". Its calls include "loud, sharp 'tuk, tuk, quéek, quéek', or 2–4 'quéek' notes each higher-pitched than preceding one".

== Status ==
The IUCN has assessed the pearly-vented tody-tyrant as being of Least Concern. It has a very large range; its population size is not known and is believed to be stable. No immediate threats have been identified. It is considered generally fairly common though local in Peru. It occurs in many protected areas.
