= San Ramón District, Chanchamayo =

Coordinates: 11.1239°S 75.3596°W

San Ramón District
- District
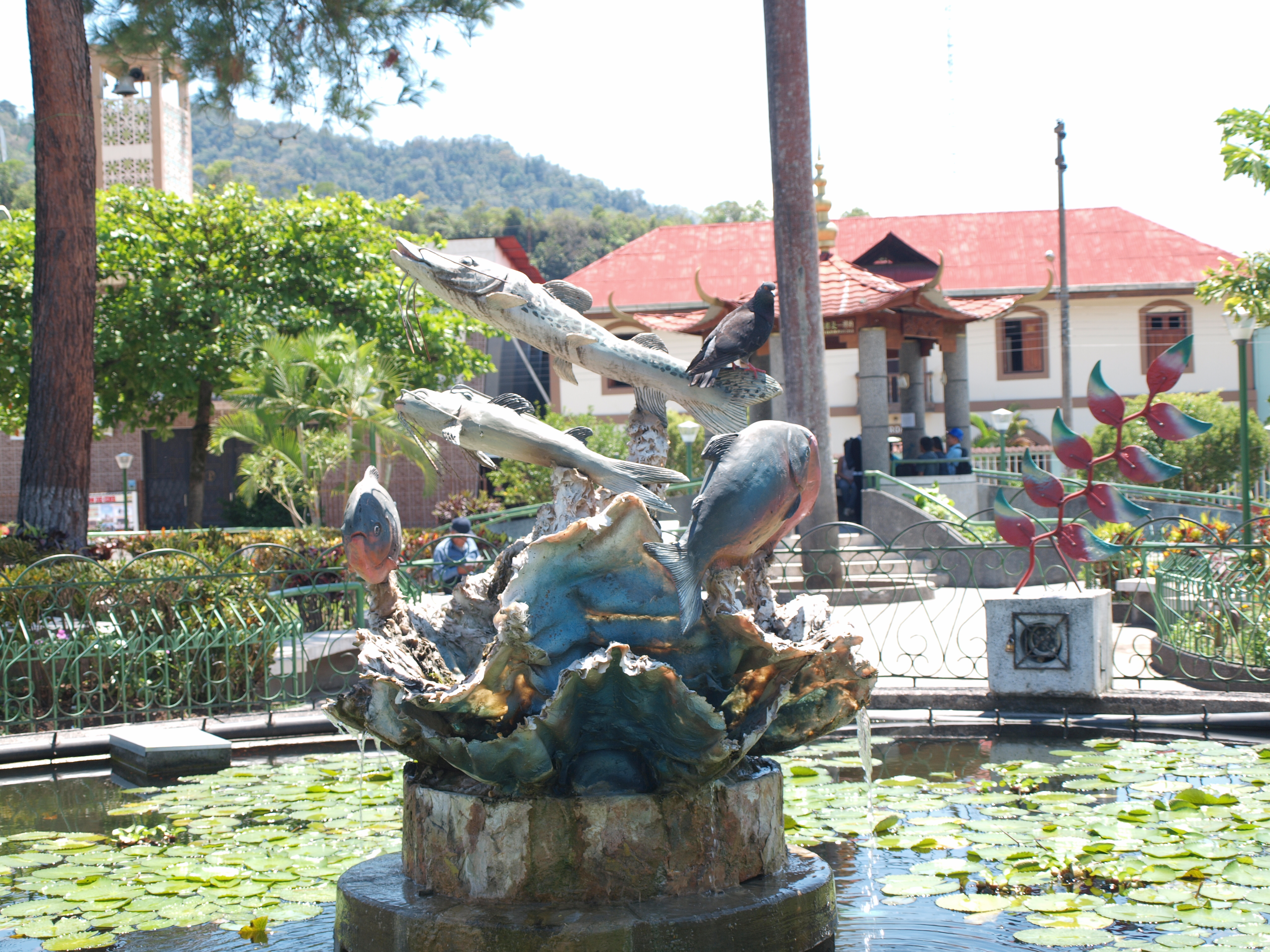

- Coat of arms

- Location of San Ramón in the Chanchamayo province
- Country: Peru
- Region: Junín
- Province: Chanchamayo
- Founded: November 14, 1908
- Capital: San Ramón

Government
  - Mayor: HRenato Antonio Carrion Wissar

Area
  - Total: 591.67 km^{2} (228.45 sq mi)
- Elevation: 820 m (2,690 ft)

Population (2005 census)
  - Total: 24,663
  - Density: 41.684/km^{2} (107.96/sq mi)
- Time zone: UTC-5 (PET)
- UBIGEO: 120305
- Website: munisanramon.gob.pe

San Ramón District is one of six districts of the province Chanchamayo in Peru.

== Climate ==
Climate data for San Ramón, elevation 800 m (2,600 ft), (1971–2000)
Month	Jan	Feb	Mar	Apr	May	Jun	Jul	Aug	Sep	Oct	Nov	Dec	Year
Mean daily maximum °C (°F)	29.2 (84.6)	28.2 (82.8)	29.0 (84.2)	29.5 (85.1)	29.3 (84.7)	29.0 (84.2)	28.7 (83.7)	30.0 (86.0)	30.7 (87.3)	30.3 (86.5)	30.4 (86.7)	29.8 (85.6)	29.5 (85.1)
Mean daily minimum °C (°F)	19.3 (66.7)	19.1 (66.4)	18.7 (65.7)	18.1 (64.6)	17.2 (63.0)	16.0 (60.8)	15.9 (60.6)	16.6 (61.9)	17.8 (64.0)	18.7 (65.7)	18.8 (65.8)	19.1 (66.4)	17.9 (64.3)
Average precipitation mm (inches)	242.0 (9.53)	260.0 (10.24)	248.0 (9.76)	199.0 (7.83)	127.0 (5.00)	79.0 (3.11)	78.0 (3.07)	96.0 (3.78)	124.0 (4.88)	180.0 (7.09)	158.0 (6.22)	217.0 (8.54)	2,008 (79.05)
Average relative humidity (%)	84	90	90	81	71	59	59	59	66	71	70	76	73
Source: FAO
