= São Raimundo =

São Raimundo (Portuguese for "Saint Raymond") may refer to:

== Brazil ==
- São Raimundo das Mangabeiras, Maranhão
- São Raimundo do Doca Bezerra, Maranhão
- São Raimundo Nonato, Piauí
  - Roman Catholic Diocese of São Raimundo Nonato, a diocese located in São Raimundo Nonato, Brazil

== Sports ==
- São Raimundo Esporte Clube (AM), a football (soccer) club from Manaus, Brazil
- São Raimundo Esporte Clube (RR), a football (soccer) club from Boa Vista, Brazil
- São Raimundo Esporte Clube (PA), a football (soccer) club from Santarém, Brazil

== See also ==
- San Raimundo, a town in Guatemala
- San Ramón (disambiguation)
