= Chanchamayo, Junín =

Town in the Junín Region in central Peru

Coordinates: 11°00′S 75°15′W

Chanchamayo or La Merced is a town in the Junín Region in central Peru. It is the capital of the Chanchamayo District, which is located in the Chanchamayo Province.

This region is located in the so-called jungle-eyebrow, which means that its geography is a mixture of mountains and jungle. The climate is not quite as hot and humid as it is in the jungle and not quite as cold and dry as it is in the mountains.
