= Vitoc District =

Coordinates: 11.2563°S 75.3756°W

Vitoc
- District
- Location of Vitoc in the Chanchamayo province
- Country: Peru
- Region: Junín
- Province: Chanchamayo
- Founded: January 27, 1871
- Capital: Vitoc

Government
  - Mayor: Percy M. Alcarraz Montejo

Area
  - Total: 313.85 km^{2} (121.18 sq mi)
- Elevation: 1,050 m (3,440 ft)

Population (2005 census)
  - Total: 2,301
  - Density: 7.332/km^{2} (18.99/sq mi)
- Time zone: UTC-5 (PET)
- UBIGEO: 120306

Vitoc District is one of six districts of the province Chanchamayo in Peru.

== See also ==
- Chiri Yaku
