= Chanchamayo province =

Coordinates: 11.054387°S 75.329036°W

Chanchamayo
- Province
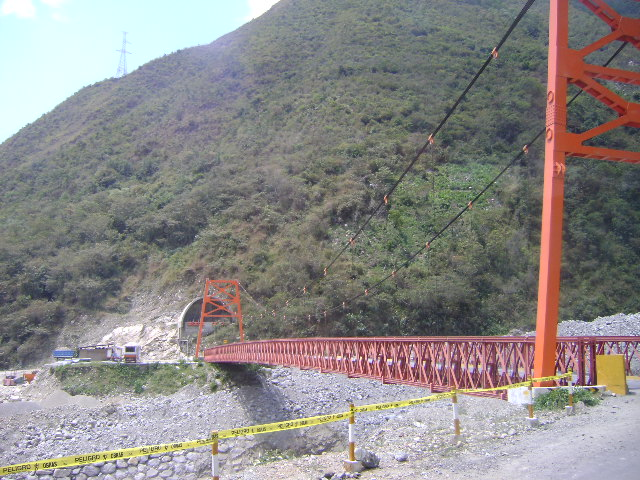
- A bridge in the San Ramón District

- Flag Coat of arms

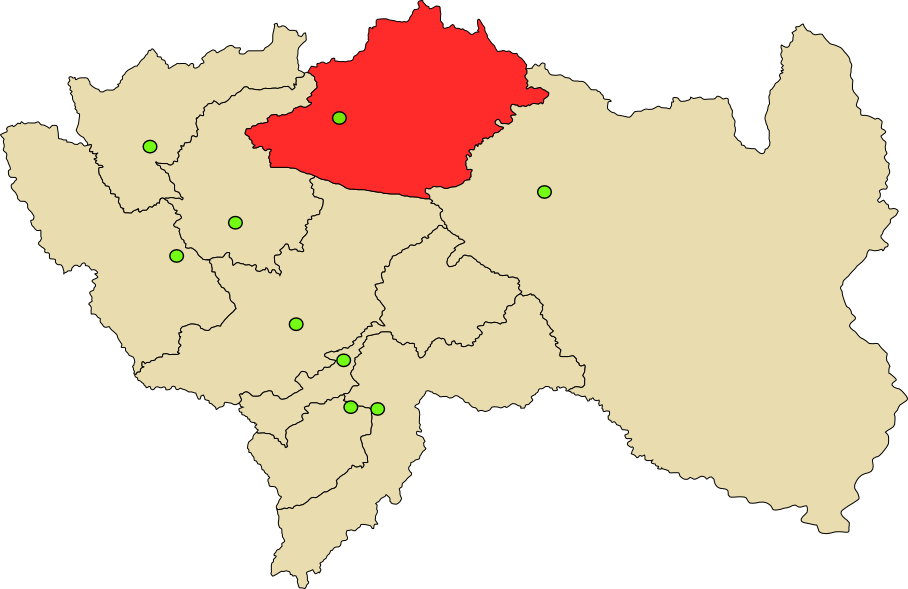
- Location of Chanchamayo in the Junín Region
- Country: Peru
- Region: Junín
- Capital: La Merced

Government
  - Mayor: Hermenegildo Navarro (2023–2026)

Area
  - Total: 4,723.4 km^{2} (1,823.7 sq mi)

Population
  - Total: 151,489
  - Density: 32.072/km^{2} (83.066/sq mi)
- Website: www.munichanchamayo.gob.pe

Chanchamayo (in Hispanicized spelling) or Chanchamayu (Quechua chanchay to walk and leap about, to walk quickly and confused, chancha chancha to walk quickly and irregularly, shancha a kind of bird, mayu river) is a province in northern Junín Region, in central Peru.

The name of the province derives from the river Chanchamayu, whose source is in the Andean Sierra and flows northwards becoming the Perené River.

The province has an estimated population of 151,489 (2017), half of whom live in the provincial capital, La Merced. Another important town in the province is San Ramón. Both towns are on the west side of the province, surrounded by mountains and close to tourist attractions like jungle forests, waterfalls and thermal springs.

Downstream the Perené river, towards the east side of the province, the land becomes flatter and more suited for agriculture. The town Bajo Pichanaqui has grown a lot in recent years as a local center of agricultural markets.

The Chanchamayo province is famous for citrus production and quality coffee growing.

== History ==
The first inhabitants of this territory were the Yanesha' people and Ashaninkas. The first reported European presence in the area dates back to 1635, when Franciscan Fray Juan Jerónimo Jiménez founded the settlement of San Buena Ventura de Quimiri which was three kilometres (2 mi) away from present-day Chanchamayo.

== Political division ==
The six districts of the Chanchamayo province.

The province is divided into six districts (Spanish: distritos, singular: distrito), each of which is headed by a mayor (alcalde). The districts, with their capitals in parentheses, are:

1. Chanchamayo (Chanchamayo)
2. San Luis de Shuaro (San Luis de Shuaro)
3. Perené (Perené)
4. Pichanaqui (Bajo Pichanaqui)
5. San Ramón (San Ramón)
6. Vitoc (Pucará)

== See also ==
- Chiri Yaku
- Kuntur Muyunan
- Pampa Hermosa Reserved Zone
