= San Ramón, Junín =

Farm village in Peru

Coordinates: 11°07′29″S 75°21′25″W

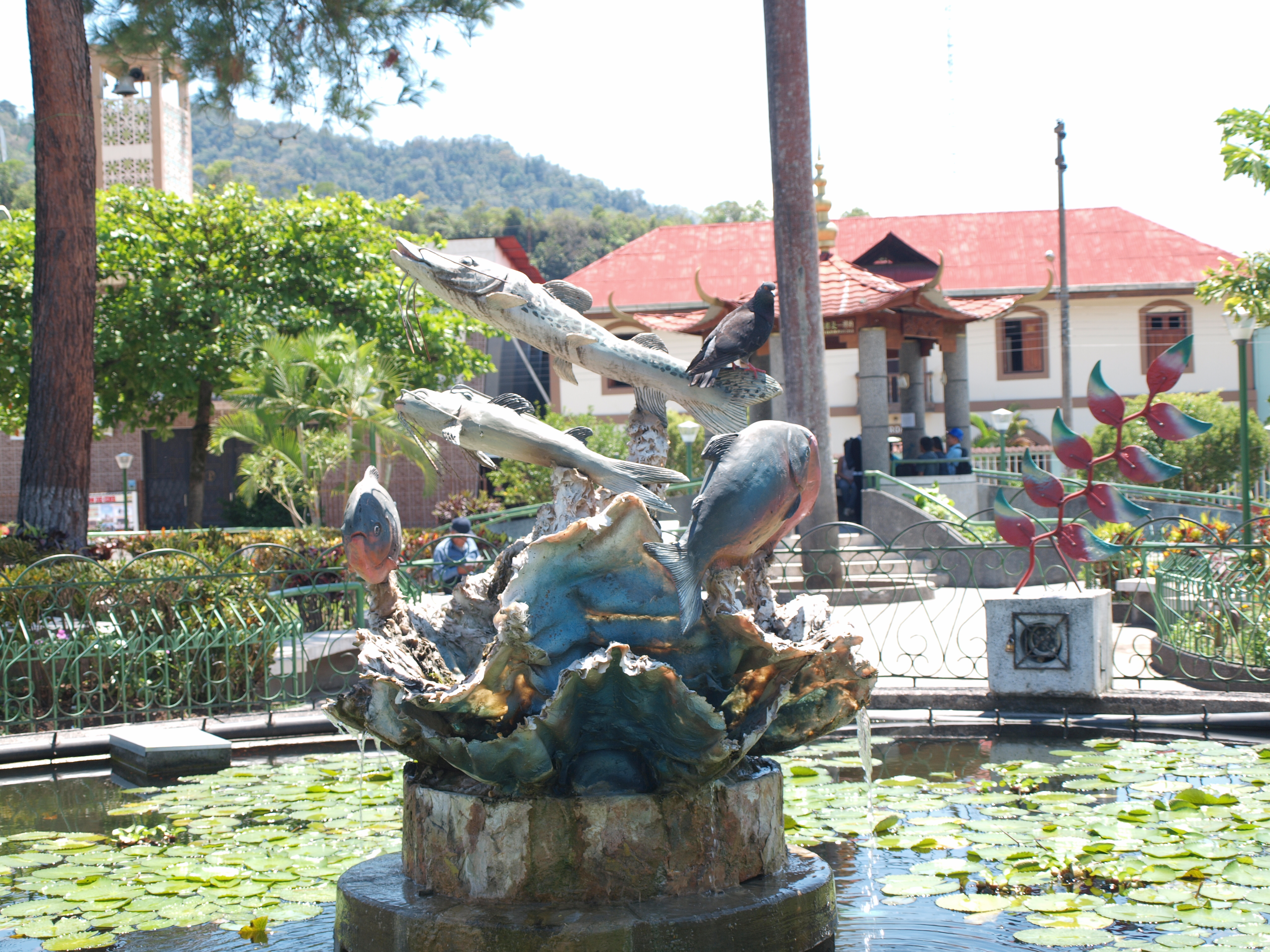
Plaza de Armas de San Ramón

San Ramón is one of two main towns in the Chanchamayo Province of the Junín Region, on the eastern slopes of the Andean Cordillera Oriental in Peru. The nearest town downstream is La Merced, the province's capital, at a distance of 12 km (7.5 mi).

== Geography ==
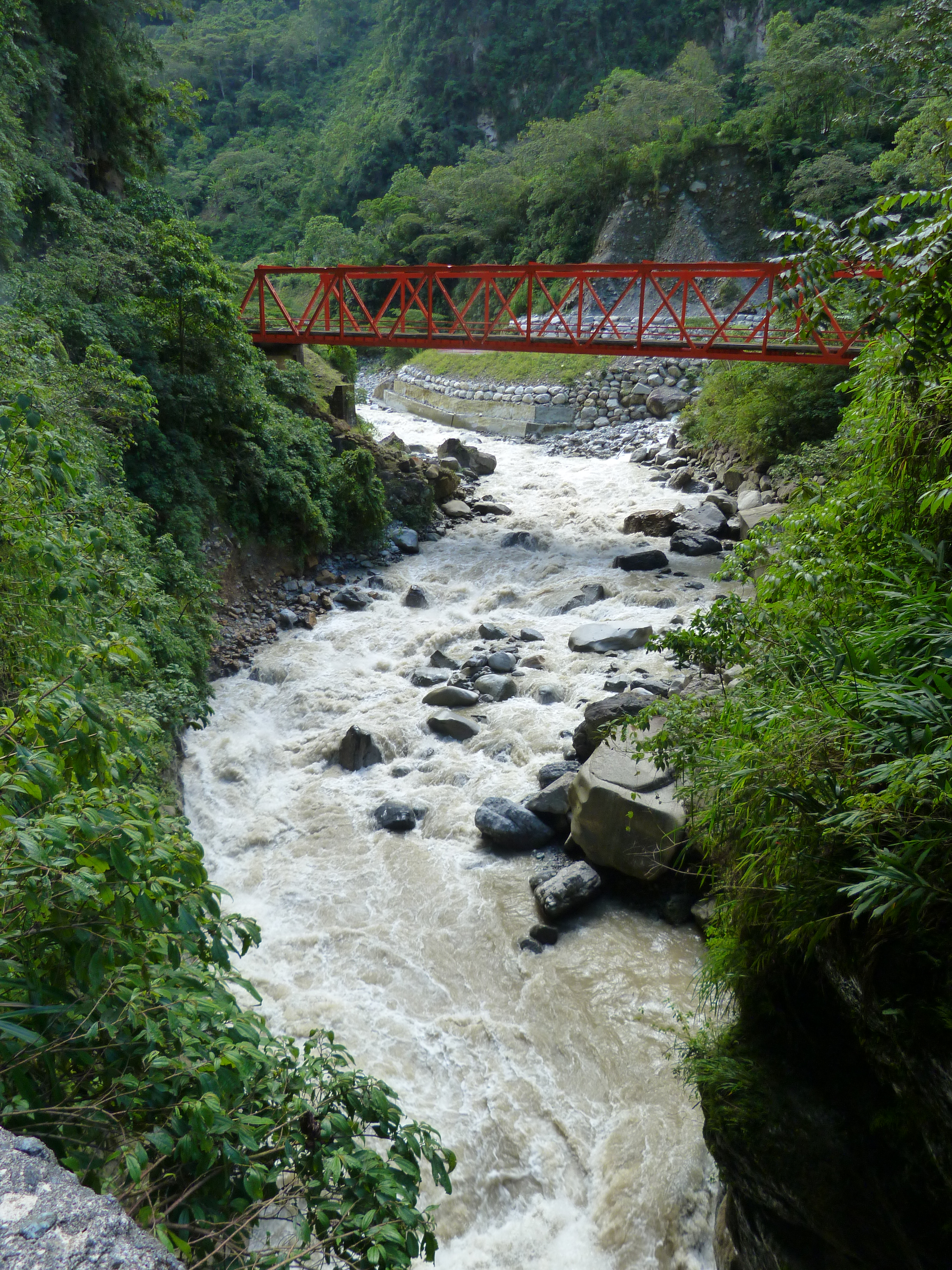
San Ramón, Chanchamayo, Junín, Perú

Situated at an elevation of 820 metres (2,690 ft) above sea level, it lies at the confluence of Tarma River and Tulumayu, which form the Chanchamayo River downstream and Perené River later. A nearby attraction in the jungle is the Terol Waterfall.

The Toro Huajrashga Mountain is west of the city.

== Overview ==
The city has a population of circa 30,0000 inhabitants. It has a warm, humid tropical climate, with most of the precipitation occurring from December to March. Temperatures range between 14 and 31 °C (57 and 88 °F). An airport with small airplanes serves the Central Jungle of Peru.

== Climate ==
Climate data for San Ramón, elevation 800 m (2,600 ft), (1971–2000)
Month	Jan	Feb	Mar	Apr	May	Jun	Jul	Aug	Sep	Oct	Nov	Dec	Year
Mean daily maximum °C (°F)	29.2 (84.6)	28.2 (82.8)	29.0 (84.2)	29.5 (85.1)	29.3 (84.7)	29.0 (84.2)	28.7 (83.7)	30.0 (86.0)	30.7 (87.3)	30.3 (86.5)	30.4 (86.7)	29.8 (85.6)	29.5 (85.1)
Mean daily minimum °C (°F)	19.3 (66.7)	19.1 (66.4)	18.7 (65.7)	18.1 (64.6)	17.2 (63.0)	16.0 (60.8)	15.9 (60.6)	16.6 (61.9)	17.8 (64.0)	18.7 (65.7)	18.8 (65.8)	19.1 (66.4)	17.9 (64.3)
Average precipitation mm (inches)	242.0 (9.53)	260.0 (10.24)	248.0 (9.76)	199.0 (7.83)	127.0 (5.00)	79.0 (3.11)	78.0 (3.07)	96.0 (3.78)	124.0 (4.88)	180.0 (7.09)	158.0 (6.22)	217.0 (8.54)	2,008 (79.05)
Average relative humidity (%)	84	90	90	81	71	59	59	59	66	71	70	76	73
Source: FAO
