= Chiriaco =

Chiriaco, Chiriyacu or Chiri Yaku, from the Quechua: chiri yaku for 'cold water', may refer to:

- Chiriaco (Apurímac) (also spelt Chiri Yaku), a mountain in Andahuaylas Province, Department of Apurímac in Peru
- Chiriaco (Imaza), a settlement and capital of the Imaza District, in Bagua Province, Peru
- Chiriaco River, in Peru, a tributary of the Río Marañón
- Chiri Yaku (also spelt Chiriyacu), a waterfall located in the Vitoc District of Chanchamayo Province, in the Junín Region of Peru

== See also ==
- Chiriaco Summit, California, a small unincorporated community in the Colorado Desert of Southern California.
  - Chiriaco Summit Airport
