= San Ramón =

San Ramón may refer to:

== Places ==
- San Ramón de la Nueva Orán, Argentina
- San Ramón, Beni, Bolivia
- San Ramón Municipality, Beni, Bolivia
- San Ramón River, Bolivia
- San Ramón, Santa Cruz, Bolivia
- San Ramón, Costa Rica
- San Ramón (canton), Alajuela, Costa Rica
- San Ramón, Chile
  - San Ramón metro station
- San Ramón, Cuscatlán, El Salvador
- San Ramón, Choluteca, Honduras
- San Ramón, Matagalpa, Nicaragua
- San Ramón District, Chanchamayo, Peru
- San Ramón, Junín, Peru
  - Apostolic Vicariate of San Ramón
- San Ramon, Gandara, Samar, Philippines
- Sant Ramon, Lleida, Spain
- San Ramon, California, United States
- San Ramon Valley, California, United States
- San Ramon Village, California, United States
- San Ramón, Uruguay

== Other uses ==
- San Ramon (coffee), a Brazilian Arabica variety
- San Ramón Fault, a geological fault in Chile

== See also ==
- Saint Raymond (disambiguation)
