= Kuntur Muyunan =

Mountain in Peru

- Location within Peru

Highest point
- Elevation: 4,200 m (13,800 ft)
- Coordinates: 11°05′53″S 75°38′40″W

Geography
- Location: Peru, Junín Region

Kuntur Muyunan (Quechua kuntur condor, muyuy to move circularly, -na, -n suffixes, 'where the condor flies around in circles', also spelled Cóndor Muyunan) is a mountain in the Andes of Peru which reaches a height of approximately 4,200 m (13,800 ft). It is located in the Junín Region, Chanchamayo Province, Chanchamayo District. Kuntur Muyunan lies north of a lake named Hatunqucha (Quechua for "big lake").
