= Ruth Buendía =

Peruvian activist (born 1977)

- Born: Ruth Zenaida Buendía Mestoquiari; 1977 (age 48–49); Cutivireni, Peru
- Occupation: activist
- Awards: Goldman Environmental Prize (2014)

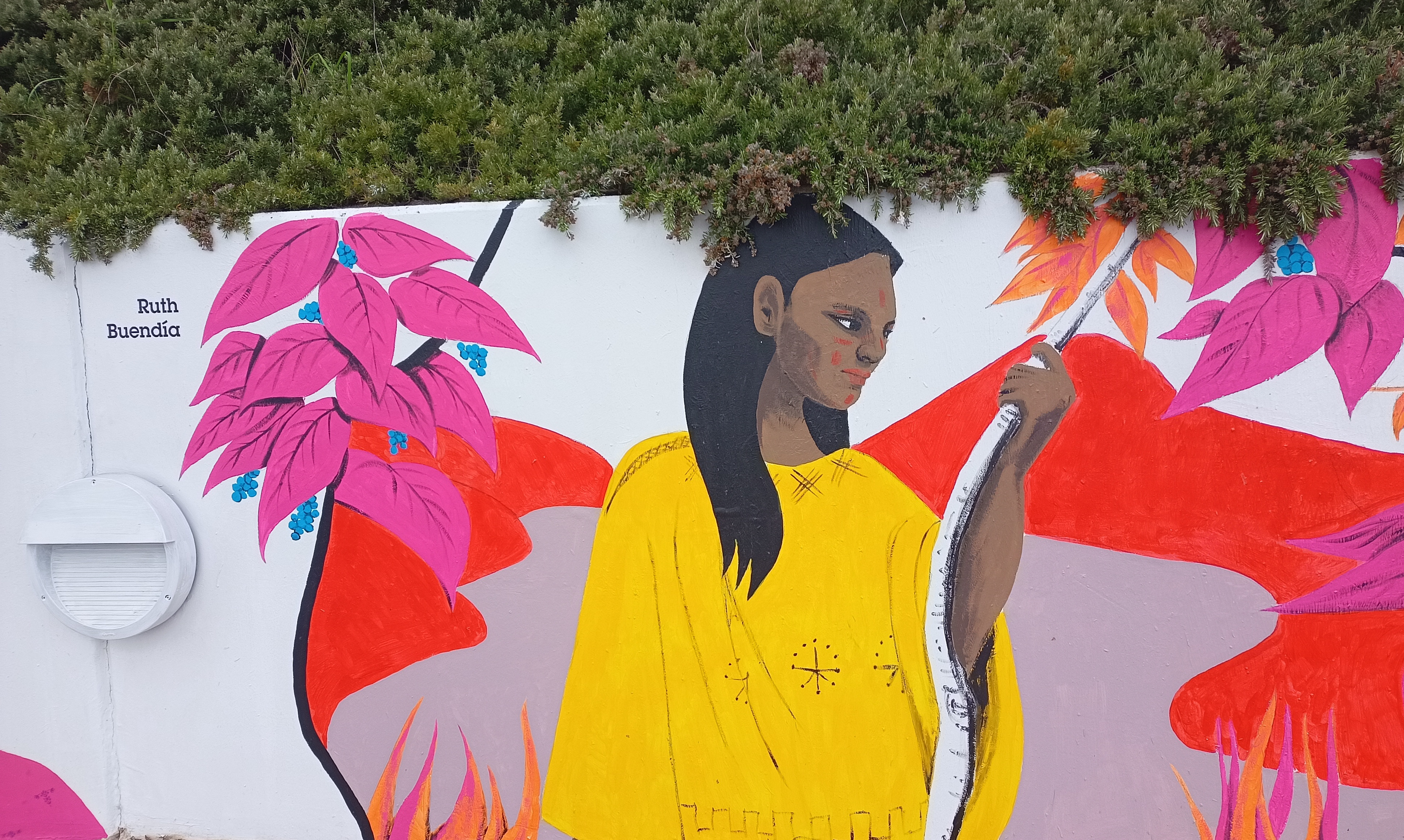

Ruth Zenaida Buendía Mestoquiari (born 1977) is an Asháninka Peruvian activist and the first woman president of "Central Asháninka del Río Ene", an organization which aims to legally represent and legitimize the 18 indigenous communities of the Asháninka people around the Ene River and the 33 annexes around it. She was awarded the 2014 Goldman Environmental Prize for having led a campaign on behalf of the Asháninka people to oppose large-scale dams that would displace indigenous communities and endanger the environment.

Buendía has also been selected among the 100 Global Thinkers of 2014 by Foreign Policy Magazine for her opposition to the construction of large-scale dams that would endanger the environment enveloping the Asháninka indigenous communities. She is a distinguished environmental activist who has fought for the rights of indigenous people in Latin America.

== Biography ==
Ruth Buendía was born in the Asháninka community of Cutivireni in Satipo Province in the Department of Junín in 1977. A that time, violence greatly increased due to the dispute between the state government and Shining Path. This caused the communities in the central part of the country to be deracinated.

After living a hard childhood, in which her father was killed by his own people for being regarded as a member of the terrorist group, she ran away with her mother and brothers to Satipo in 1991. She spent some years working as waitress in Lima and Satipo until 2003, when she decided to join the organization Central asháninka del Río Ene (CARE). After some years of political and environmental activity, she became the President of the organization in 2005, and was re-elected in 2009 and 2013.

=== Involvement in CARE ===
In 1995, Buendía returned to Satipo with her family, recovered her documents and enrolled in her first course of night school. During her travels between the two cities she had the opportunity of meeting the Asháninkas pertaining to CARE also known by her father, who then invited her to participate as a volunteer. In 2003 she began her involvement preparing and delivering documents of identification to people who lived in the communities around the Ene River who needed to flee the area due to the presence of the Shining Path. In this way it was possible for Buendía to rekindle her contact with the rest of the Asháninka communities and empathize with their problems, which, apart from the overall social violence that burdened them throughout the 1980s and 90's, included lack of representation at the state level in the regions of the Peruvian Amazon, increased immigration from the Andes whose inhabitants brought with them the production and trafficking of cocaine, as well as the concession of their communal lands to hydroelectric and petroleum companies on behalf of the government. She also met her current partner during this time, with whom she's had four children.

At that time, CARE was not an organization that very well represented the interests of the Asháninkas. It had been founded in 1994 in order to represent the 17 indigenous communities situated in the basin of the Ene among the 33 annexes, but it did not confer with officially organized teams or offices. Furthermore, other communities did not recognize its existence and it was not formally registered in public records, due to which the organization could not communicate in an official capacity with the central government nor with other organizations with potentially similar aims in an urban context. These problems were exposed in the CARE Assembly of 2005. It was then decided that a transitional Board of Directors would be chosen with the objective to nationalize the movement. After two years of working deeply in the communities, and with the massive support of the women within them, Ruth Buendía was elected President of the provisionary Board of Directors of CARE, simultaneously being their first female candidate and female president. In the beginnings of her term, the male members of the Asháninka did not view being led by Buendía kindly, but very promptly she won the trust and respect of her people. As she herself says,

Some men did at first berate me regarding my election. They said that we women are incompetent with these sorts of dealings. It's the most machista group of my people. Fortunately, I've got the heart of a warrior and I showed it to them. — Ruth Buendía

One year after the Assembly, Buendía was elected as President of the permanent Board of CARE, and was re-elected in 2009 and 2013, being the principal representative of the 10,000 to 12,000 people in the Ene River basin.

== Pakitzapango and international recognition ==
In 2009 and 2010, Ruth Buendía and CARE led the protests against the construction of a hydroelectric dam in Pakitzapango, a project that endangered the welfare of the Asháninka community in the Ene River watershed. As a result of this, the Peruvean Government was forced to rescind the grants from the company responsible for the construction, Pakitzapango Energía S.A.C., blocking the project until the present day. Buendía, as representative of the CARE, received the Goldman Environmental Prize in 2014, as well as other awards which led to her being regarded as one of the most important environmentalists in South America.
