= Chiri Yaku =

Coordinates: 11.1824°S 75.3110°W

- Interactive map of Chiri Yaku
- Location: Peru, Junín Region, Chanchamayo Province, Vitoc District
- Total height: 20 m (66 ft)

Chiri Yaku (Quechua chiri cold, yaku water, "cold water", also spelled Chiriyacu) is a waterfall in the Junín Region of Peru. It is located in the Chanchamayo Province, Vitoc District, at a height of 1,033 m (3,389 ft). Chiri Yaku is approximately 20 m (66 ft) high.
