= Saint Raymond =

Saint Raymond may refer to:

- Raymond of Fitero (d. 1163), founder of the Order of Calatrava
- Raymond the Palmer (1140–1200)
- Raymond of Peñafort O.P. (c. 1175 – 1275)
- Raymond Nonnatus (1204–1240)
- Raymond of Toulouse (saint) (d. 1118)
- Saint Raymond (musician), British singer-songwriter
- Saint-Raymond, Quebec
- St. Raymond High School for Boys in The Bronx, New York

== See also ==
- San Ramón (disambiguation)
