= Tambo River (Peru) =

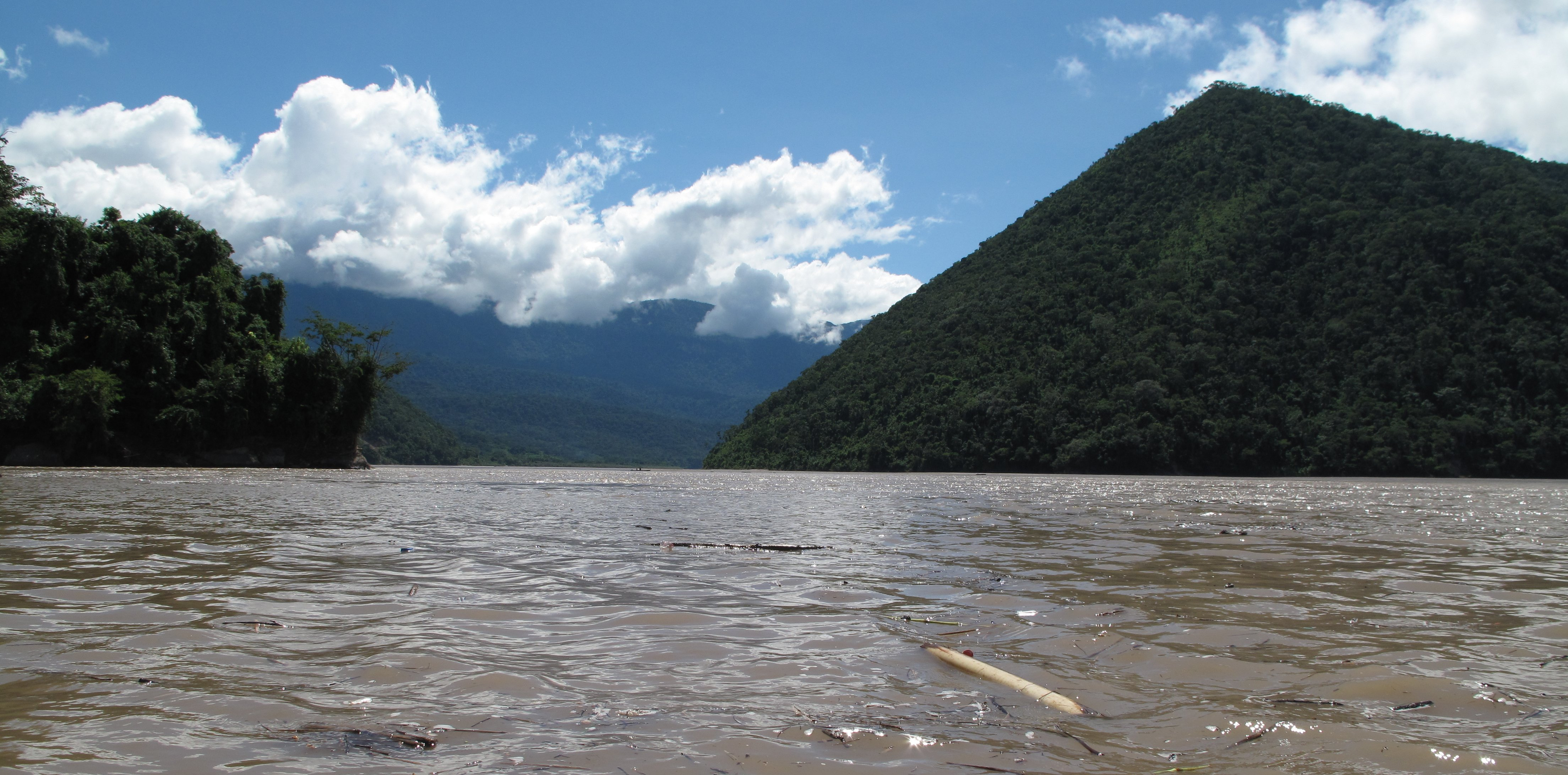
- View of the Tambo River near Puerto Prado

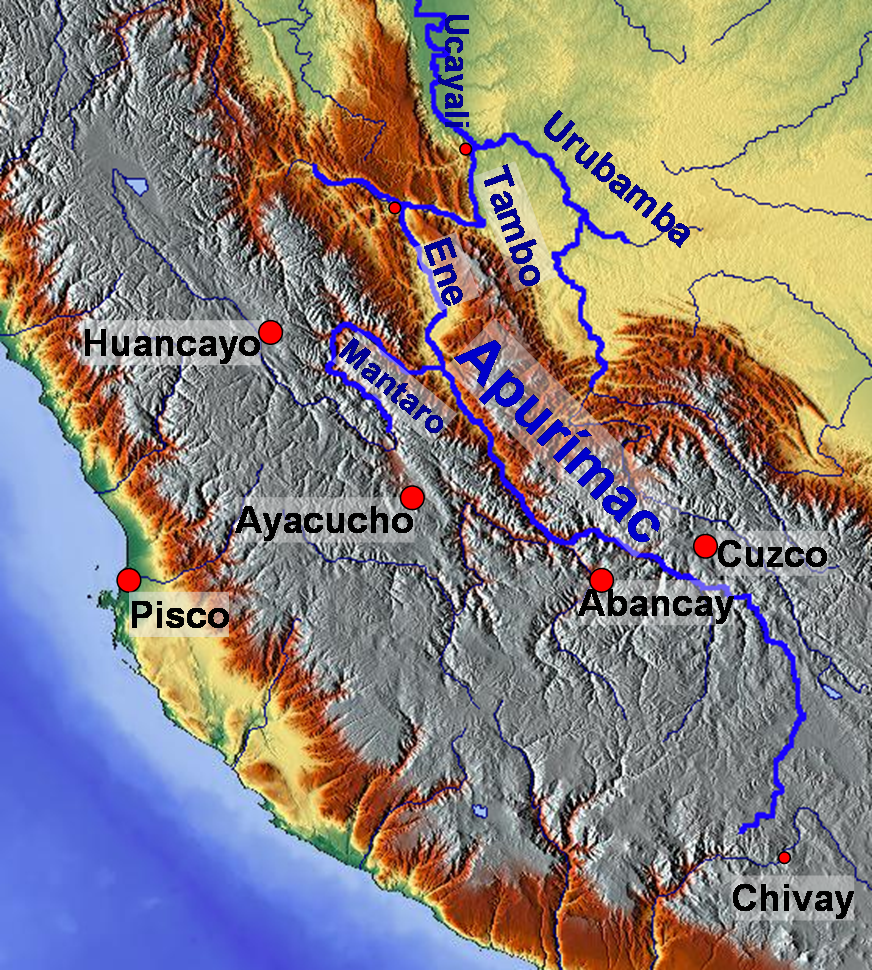
- Map of large rivers in south-central Peru

Location
- Country: Peru

Physical characteristics
- Source: Confluence of Ene and Perené Rivers
  - location: Peru
  - coordinates: 11°9′56″S 74°14′7″W
  - elevation: 400 m (1,300 ft)
- Mouth: Ucayali River
  - location: confluence with Urubamba River, Peru
  - coordinates: 10°41′57″S 73°45′22″W
  - elevation: 287 m (942 ft)
- Length: 159 km (99 mi)
- Discharge
  - average: 2,800 m^{3}/s (99,000 cu ft/s)

The Tambo River (Spanish: Río Tambo) is a Peruvian river on the eastern slopes of the Andes. The name only refers to a relatively short section of the waterbody; about 159 km (99 mi) long. It starts at the confluence of the Ene and Perené Rivers at the town of Puerto Prado. From here the Tambo flows 70 km (43 mi) in an easterly direction and then turns north. When merging with the Urubamba River at the town of Atalaya, it becomes the Ucayali River.

The Tambo is part of the headwaters of the Amazon River whose origin is the Mantaro River at Cordilerra Ruminator Cruz.

The name Tambo is derived from Quechua tánpu, which means an army camp, storehouse or inn.
