= St. Joseph's Seraphic Seminary =

- U.S. National Register of Historic Places
- U.S. Historic district
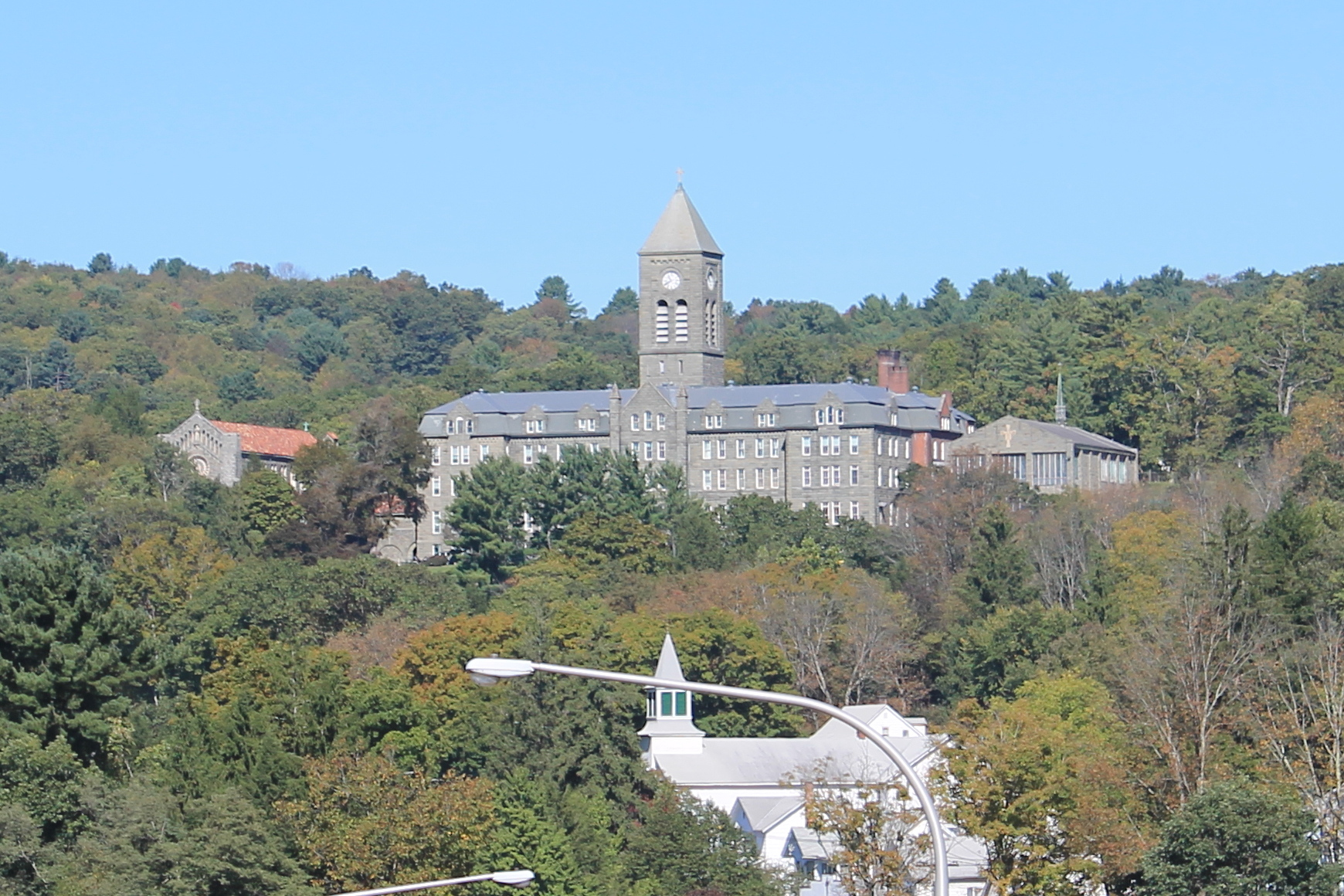

- Location within New York Location within the United States
- Location: Seminary Rd. W side, Callicoon, New York
- Coordinates: 41°46′12″N 75°3′29″W
- Built: 1904
- Architect: Comes, Perry & McMullen
- Architectural style: Romanesque
- MPS: Upper Delaware Valley, New York and Pennsylvania MPS
- NRHP reference No.: 93000582
- Added to NRHP: July 8, 1993

St. Joseph's Seraphic Seminary is a former Roman Catholic minor seminary in Callicoon (CDP), New York, located on the west side of Seminary Road in that town. A Romanesque part of the seminary was built in 1904. A historic district including church and agricultural buildings was listed on the National Register of Historic Places in 1993.

== History ==
Founded in 1904, the school was dedicated by Cardinal John Farley, the Archbishop of New York, in 1911. It served as the minor seminary of the Holy Name Province of the Order of Friars Minor. This province covers the eastern United States from Maine to Florida. Students entered St. Joseph's in the 9th grade and remained until the completion of two years of college. The curriculum was classical, with Greek and Latin as core subjects. Upon completion of the six-year program at Callicoon, the seminarians would advance to the novitiate of the Order, where they prepared to be received as members of the Order.

The school was closed in 1972, and the property was sold to the federal government in 1977. Universities operated by the Franciscan friars of Holy Name Province include St. Bonaventure University and Siena College.

Since June 1979, the site has served as the Delaware Valley Job Corps Center, a residential vocational training facility for low-income students.
