= Ene River =

River in peru

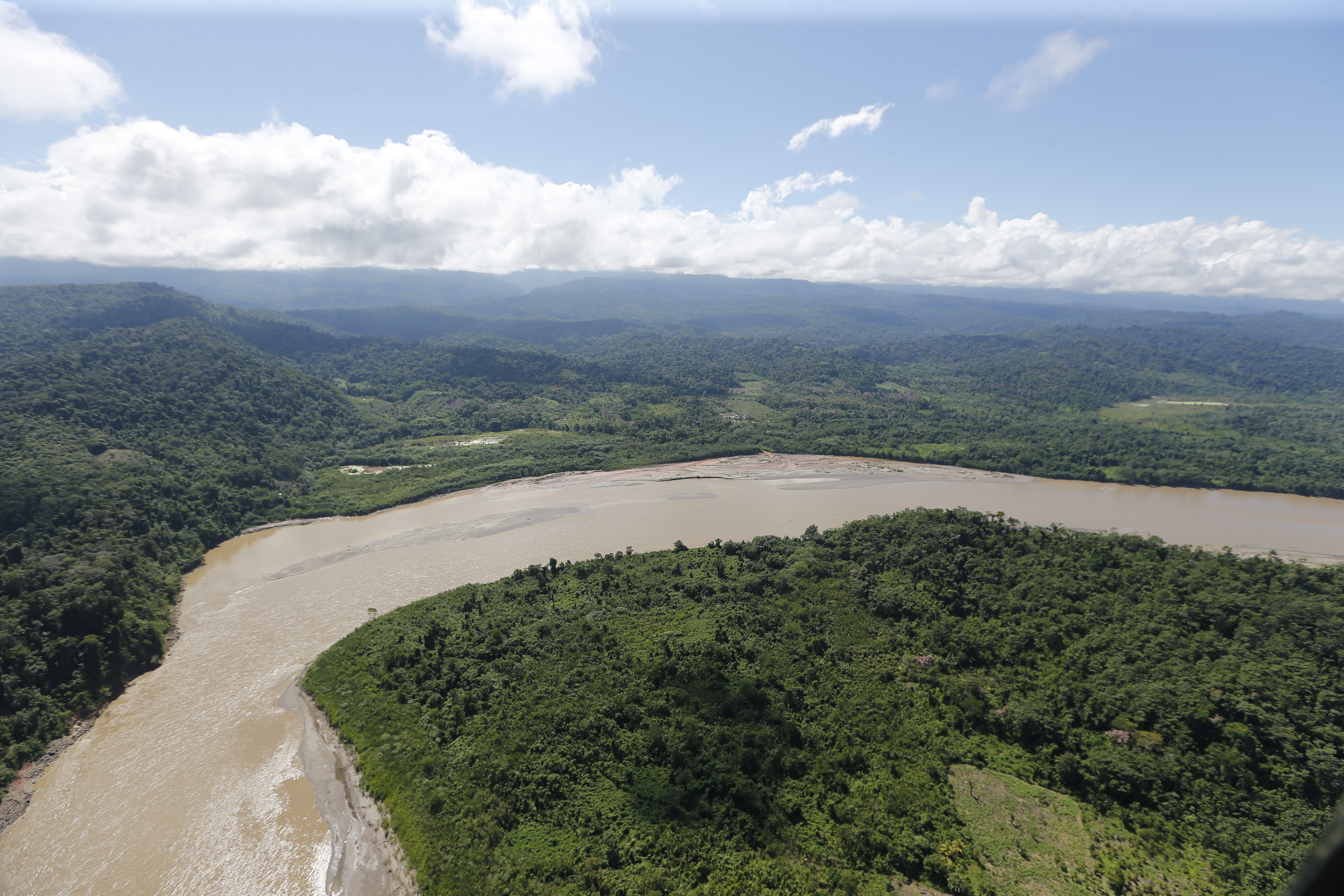
Ene River

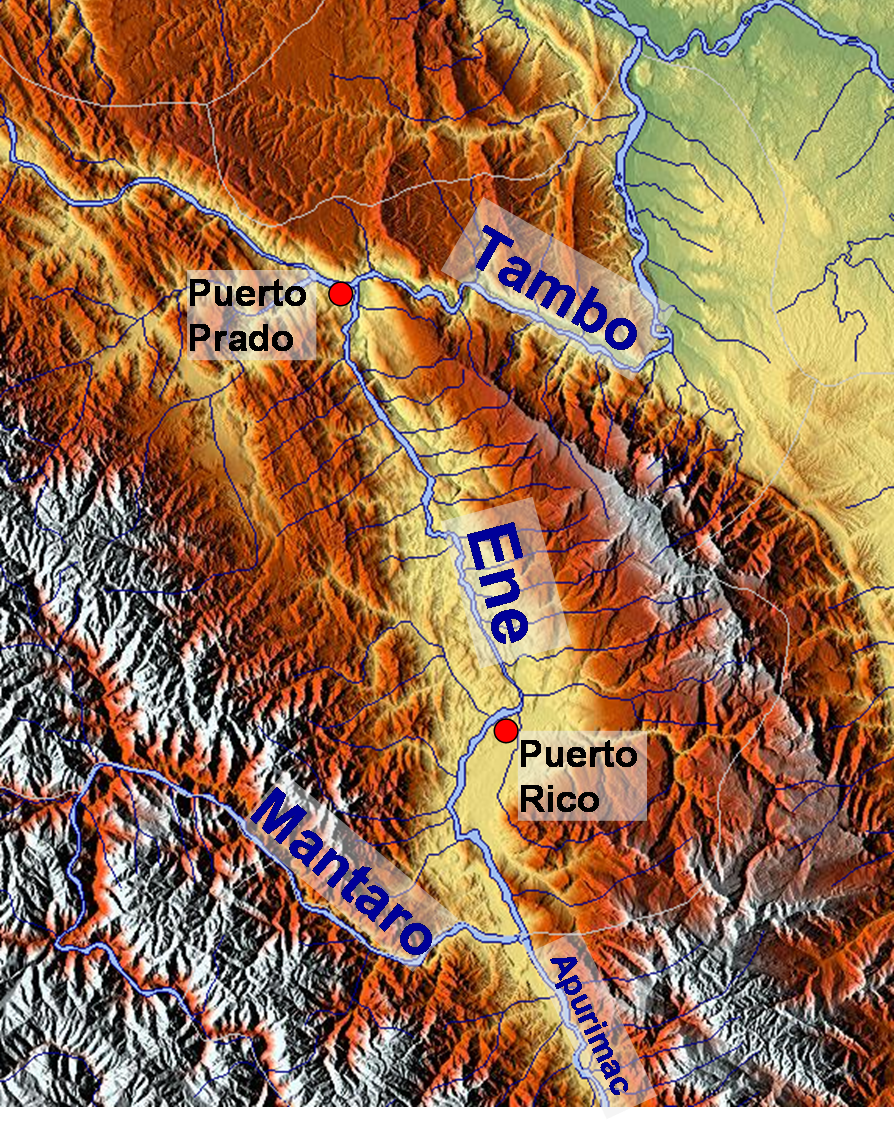
Map of the landscape relief around the Ene River in southeastern Peru

The Ene River (Spanish: Río Ene; Quechua: Iniy mayu) is a Peruvian river on the eastern slopes of the Andes. It is a headwater of the Amazon River.

== Geography ==
=== Headwaters ===
The Ene is formed at 12°15′45″S 73°58′30″W at the confluence of the Mantaro River and the Apurímac River, circa 400 m above sea level, where the three Peruvian Regions Junín, Cusco, and Ayacucho meet.

The river flows in a northwesterly direction at a total length of 180.6 km (112.2 mi).

The Ene River is part of the headwaters of the Amazon River whose origin is at the Mismi, south of the city of Cusco where it first becomes Apurímac River, then the Ene River and Tambo River before its waters meet the Ucayali River which later forms the Amazon.

At 11°09′39″S 74°14′48″W the Ene River joins the Perené River at the town Puerto Prado, 295 m (968 ft) above sea level, and is called the Tambo from then on.

== Threats ==
The proposed 2,200-megawatt Pakitzapango hydroelectric dam would flood much of the Ene River valley. Protests by the Central Ashaninka del Rio Ene (CARE, Asháninka Center of the Ene River) and Ruth Buendia (president since 2005) have halted the construction. For her efforts, Buendia was awarded the Goldman Environmental Prize in 2014.
