= La Merced, Junín =

La Merced, Chanchamayo (in hispanicized spelling) or Chanchamayu (Quechua chanchay to walk and leap about, to walk quickly and confused, chancha chancha to walk quickly and irregularly, shancha a kind of bird, mayu river) is the capital of the Chanchamayo Province in the Junín Region in Peru.

== Geography ==
La Merced is situated on 11°03′43″S 75°20′06″W, as the crow flies 75 km north of the regional capital Huancayo-Junín and 220 km northeast of the country's capital Lima, at an elevation of 751 m above sea level. On the paved road it takes 305 km from Lima to La Merced.

== History ==
The place was founded about 1884 by Jose Manuel Pereira after the Pacific war by a group of Italian immigrants. Before that period there were many attempts to colonize Chanchamayo's valley but those were repelled by the local Ashaninkas, especially under the leadership of Juan Santos Atahualpa. The Peruvian army protected the colonists with a small garrison in Kimiri in front of the actual barracks. Gradually, the Ashaninkas moved down river and eventually melted with the colonists. La Merced lies on the western bank of the river Chanchamayu which later becomes Perené River, a tributary of the Amazonas.

== Population ==
At the 2015 census, the city had a population of about 25,000 inhabitants.

In terms of anthropology, the Chanchamayo region is a multicultural city influenced by the local Asháninka.

== Tourism ==
Despite the long distance from Peru's capital city, Lima, and due to its pleasant weather and exotic scenery, La Merced and its surrounding countryside remains a popular destination for domestic tourists.

The surrounding areas of the city feature waterfalls, whitewater creeks, jungle-like forest, tree-covered hills, rivers, traditionally living indigenous tribes, plantations and an abundance of wildlife and species of birds.

== Economy ==
The economy of the Chanchamayo region relies primarily on tourism, the cultivation and production of coffee, as well as the production of fruits and vegetables such as papayas, oranges, cassavas, avocados, pineapples, and passion fruits.
