= Chanchamayo River =

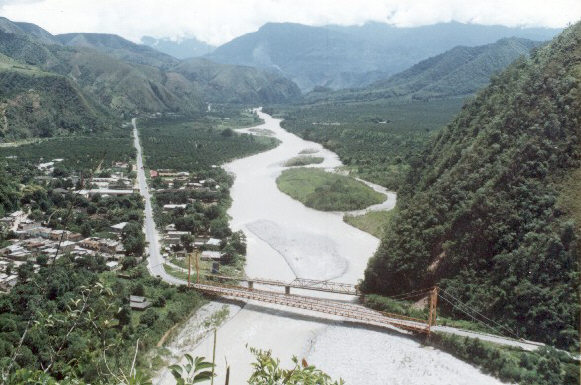
- Herreria Bridge across Chanchamayo
- Etymology: Quechua

Location
- Country: Peru
- Region: Junín Region

The Chanchamayo River (possibly from Quechua chanchay to walk and leap about, to walk quickly and confused, chancha chancha to walk quickly and irregularly, shancha a kind of bird, mayu river,) is a river in the Junín Region in Peru. It originates in the Huaytapallana mountain range where it is named Tulumayu. The Chanchamayo flows along the town of La Merced, which is also called Chanchamayo. After joining Paucartambo River, it is called Perené River.

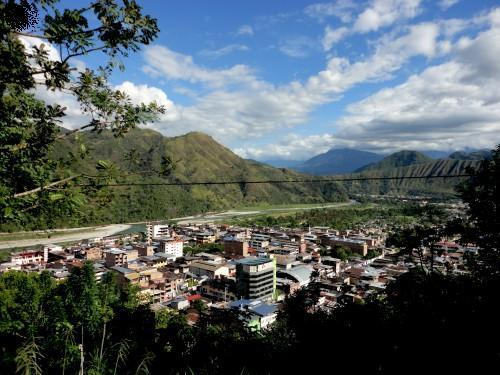
The river Chanchamayo flows along the town of Chanchamayo or La Merced

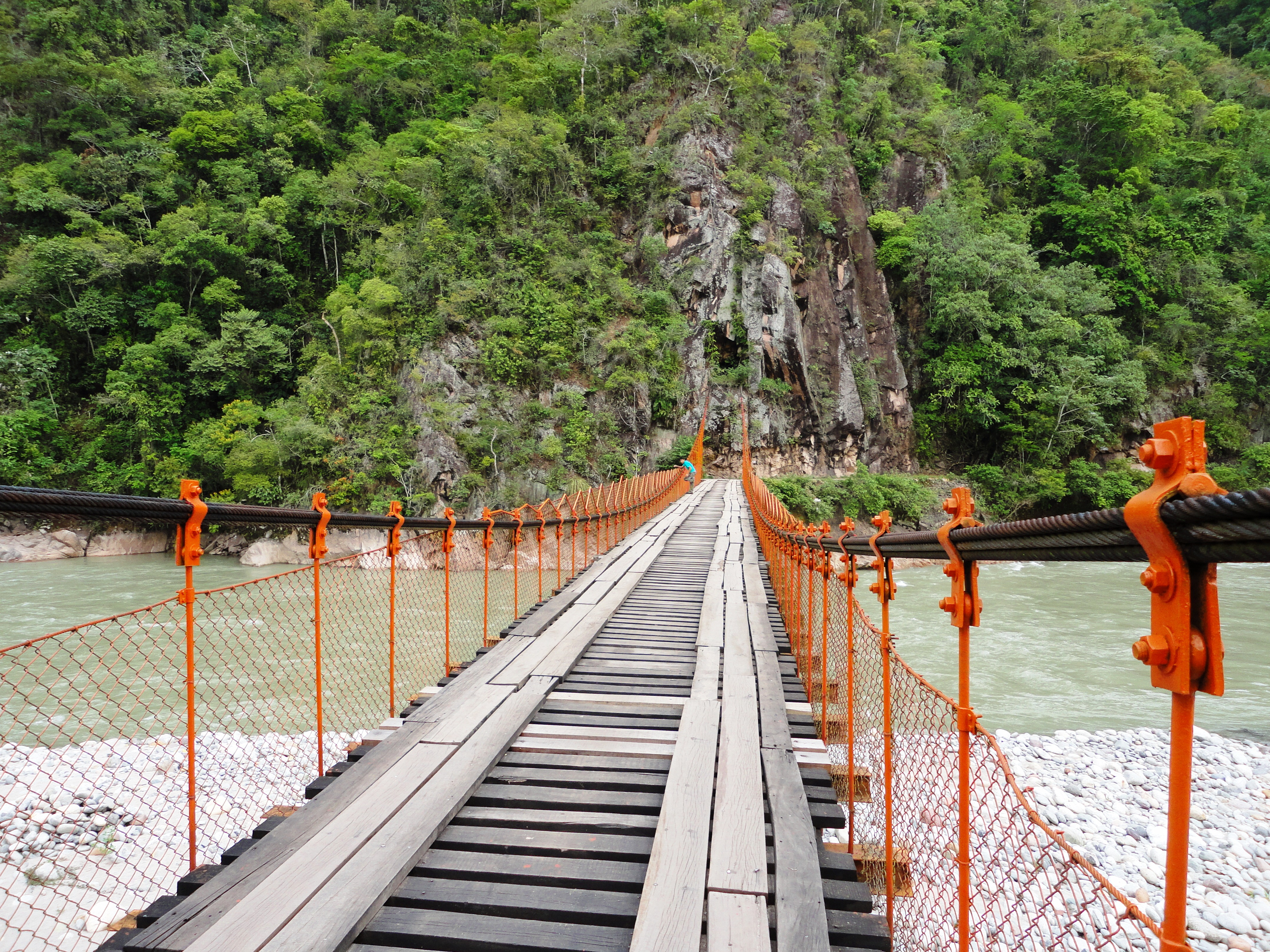
Kimiri Bridge across the Chanchamayo, near Kimiri
