= Perené River =

Perené
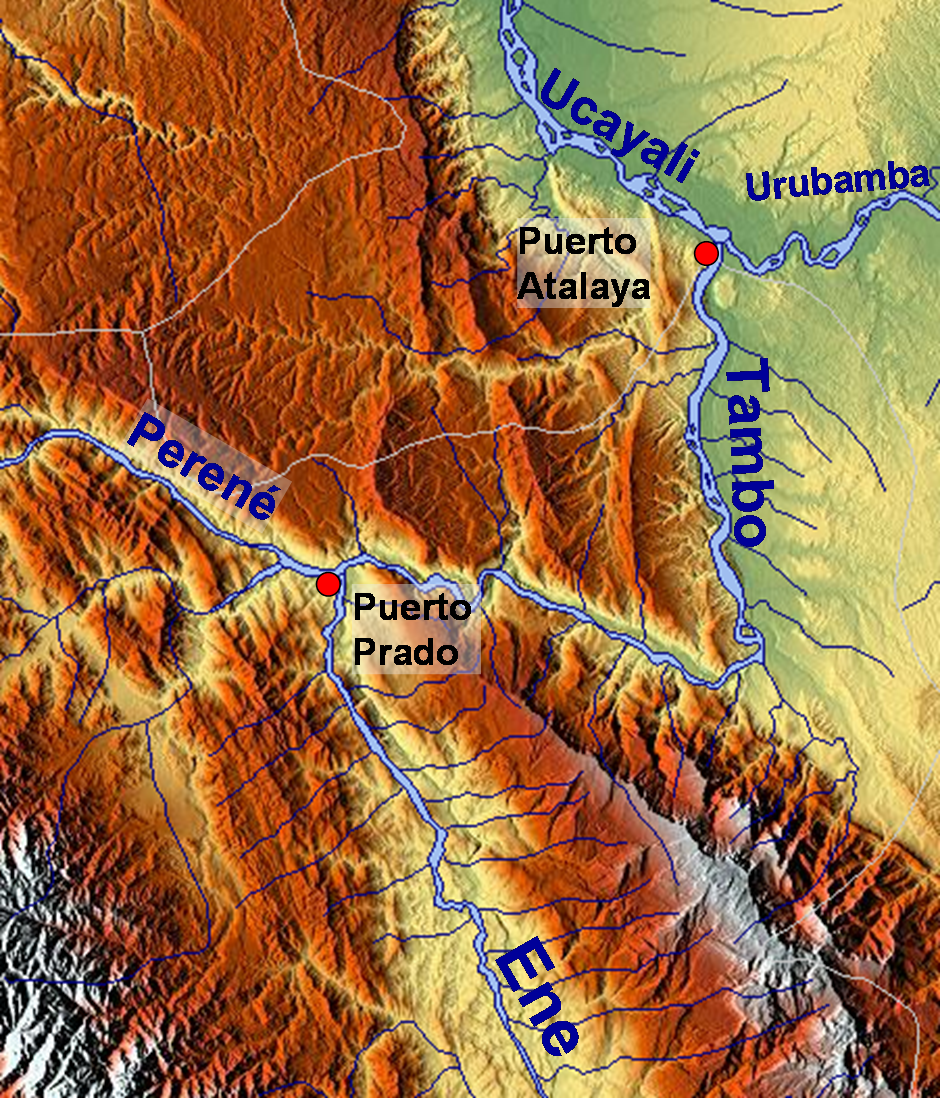

Location
- Country: Peru

Physical characteristics
- Source
  - location: confluence of the Chanchamayo and Paucartambo Rivers, Peru
  - coordinates: 10°57′06″S 75°17′00″W
  - elevation: 650 m (2,130 ft)
- Mouth: Tambo River
  - location: confluence with Ene River, Peru
  - coordinates: 11°09′54″S 74°14′03″W
  - elevation: 400 m (1,300 ft)
- Length: 165 km (103 mi)

The Perené River (Spanish: Río Perené) is a Peruvian river on the eastern slopes of the South American Andes.

It is formed at the confluence of the Chanchamayo and Paucartambo Rivers, 15 km (9.3 mi) above the community of Perené, actually two pueblos of Santa Ana and Pampa Silva divided by the river, at 650 m (2,130 ft) above sea level.

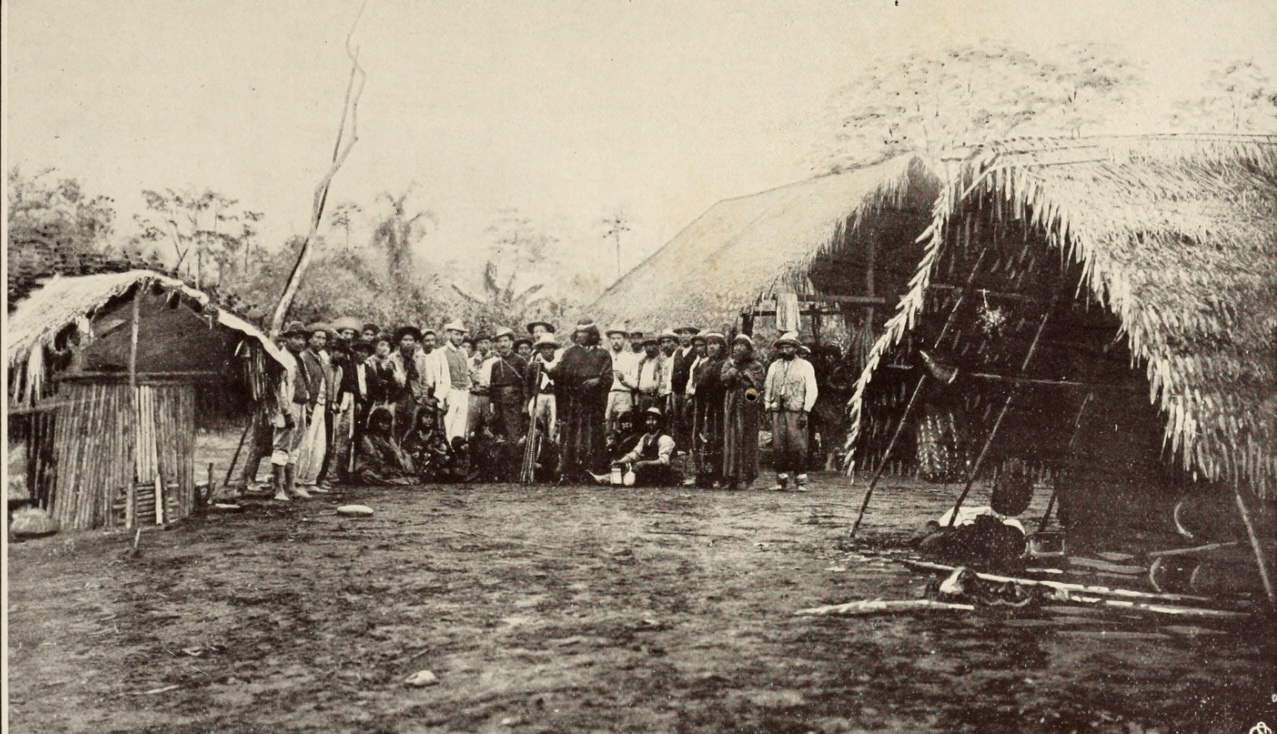
Members of a surveying expedition rests at an indigenous settlement along a bank of the Perené River, photograph circa 1906.

The 165 km (103 mi) river flows in a south-easterly direction. The Perené joins the Ene River, 10 km (6.2 mi) below the community of Puerto Ocopa, at 400 m (1,300 ft) above sea level, and is called the Tambo River from then on.
