= Department of Junín =

Department of Peru

Junín Sunin (Quechua)
- Department
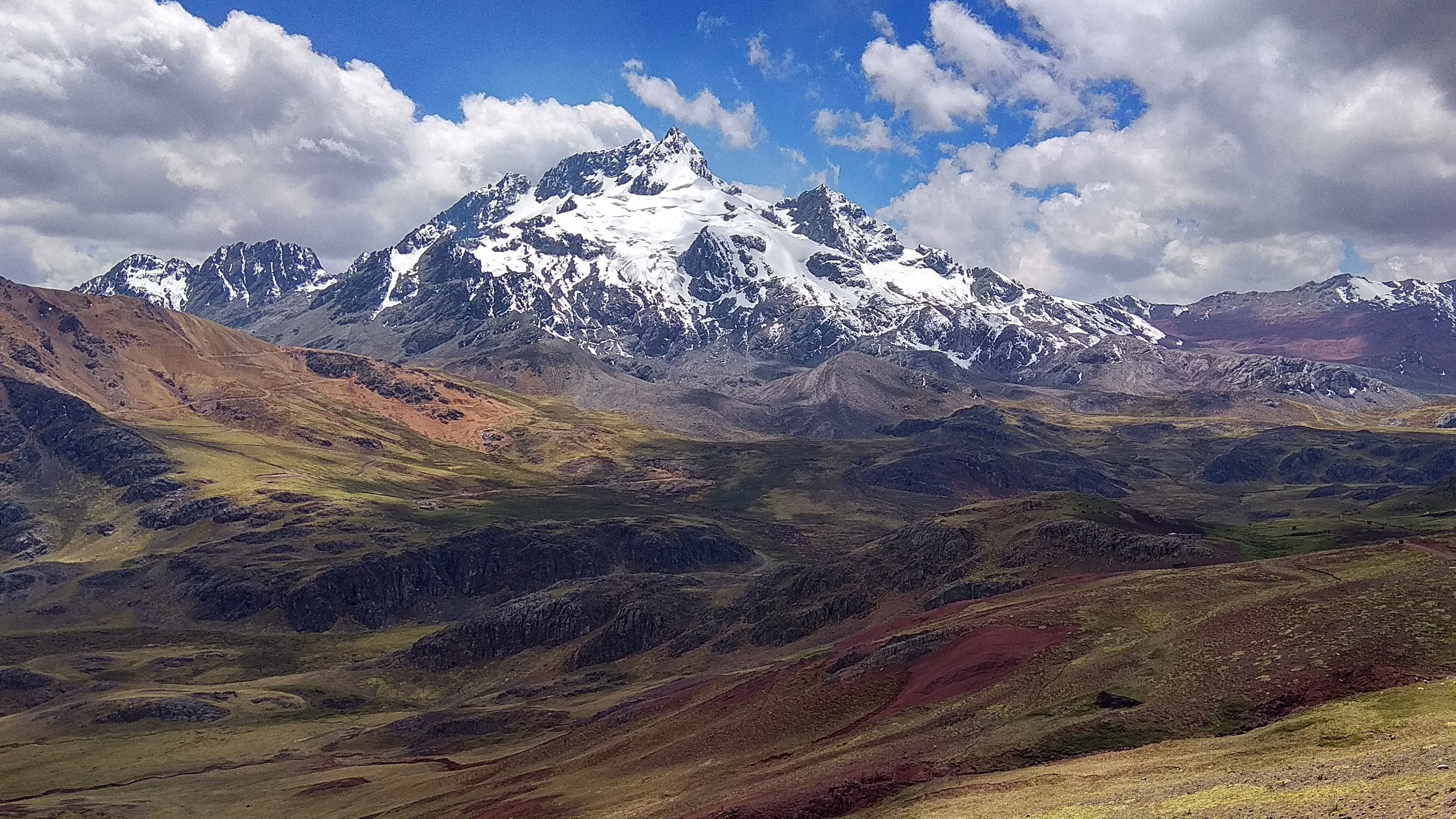
- View of the Andes Mountains

- Flag Coat of arms

- Location of Junín in Peru
- Coordinates: 11.48°S 74.98°W
- Country: Peru
- Capital: Huancayo
- Provinces: List: Chanchamayo; Chupaca; Concepción; Huancayo; Jauja; Junín; Satipo; Tarma; Yauli

Government
  - Type: Regional Government
  - Governor: Zósimo Cárdenas Muje

Area
  - Total: 44,197.23 km^{2} (17,064.65 sq mi)
- Highest elevation: 4,818 m (15,807 ft)

Population (2025)
  - Total: 1,422,597
  - Density: 32.18747/km^{2} (83.36516/sq mi)
- Demonym: juninense
- UBIGEO: 12
- Dialing code: 064
- ISO 3166 code: PE-JUN
- Principal resources: Potato, coffee, fruit, silver, zinc, lead.
- Website: www.regionjunin.gob.pe

Junín (Spanish pronunciation: [xuˈnin]; Quechua: Sunin) is a department of Peru. It is located in the central highlands and westernmost Peruvian Amazon. It is governed by a regional government. Its capital is Huancayo.

== Geography ==
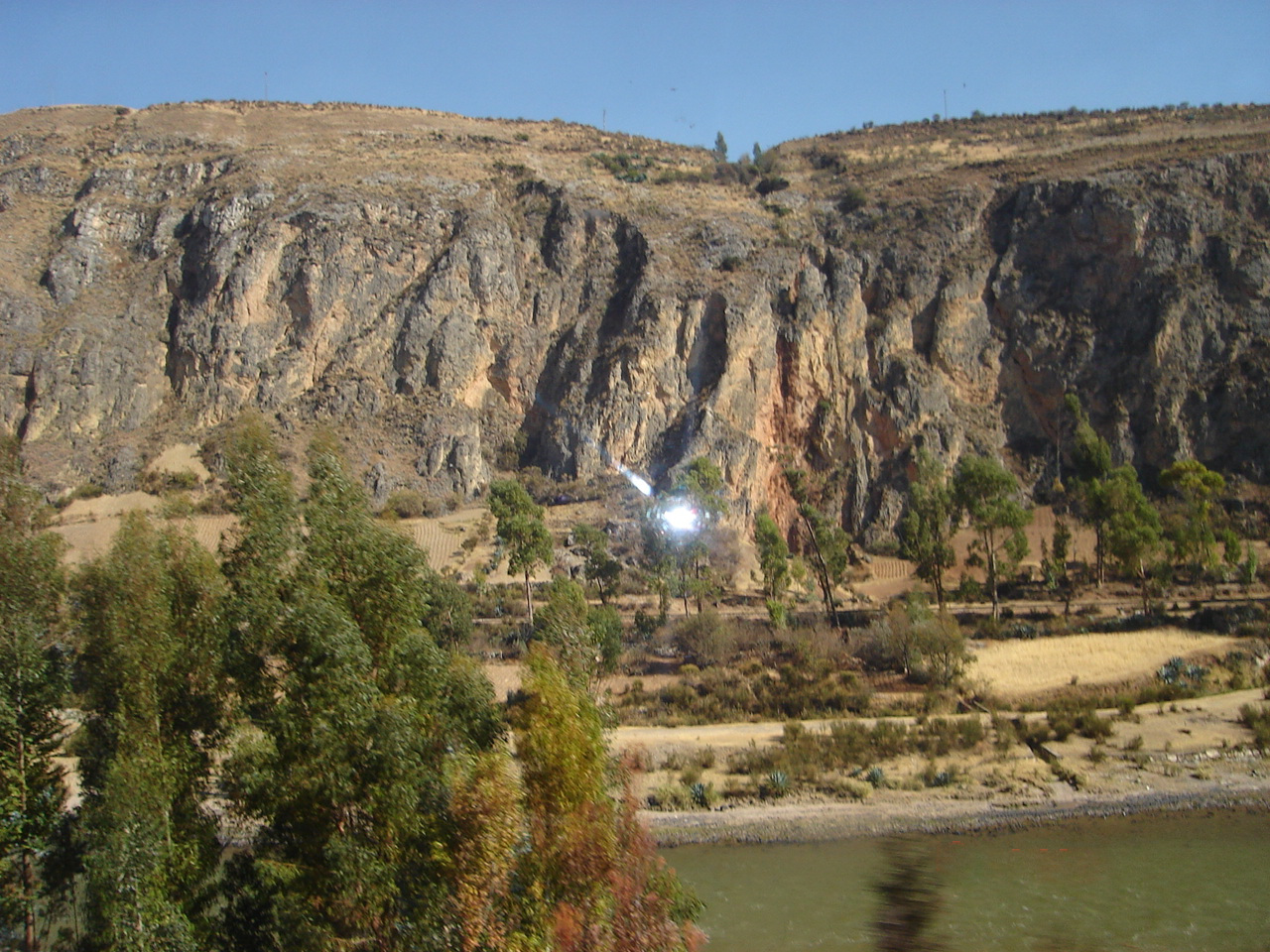
Mantaro Valley.

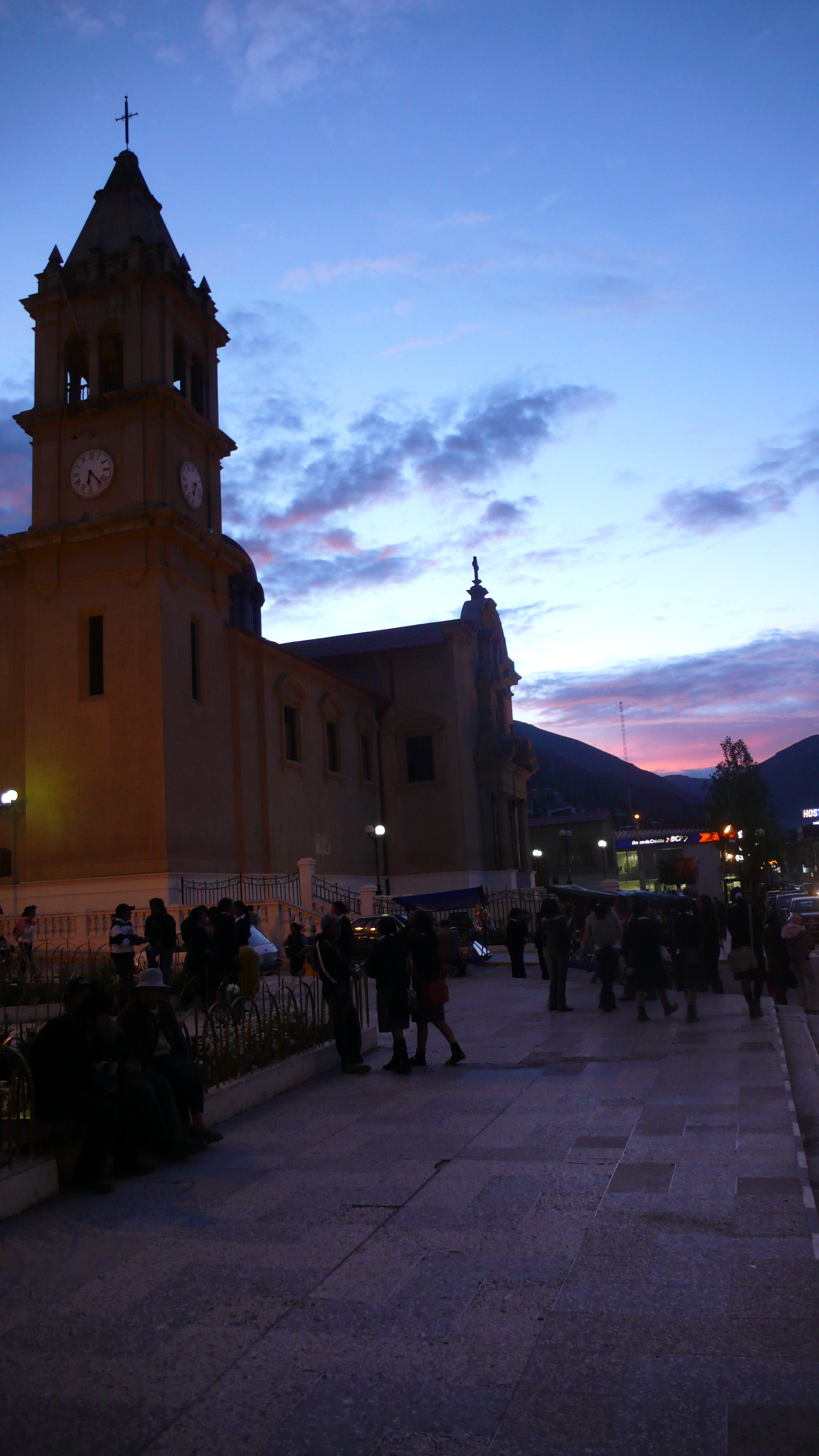
Santa Ana de Tarma church.

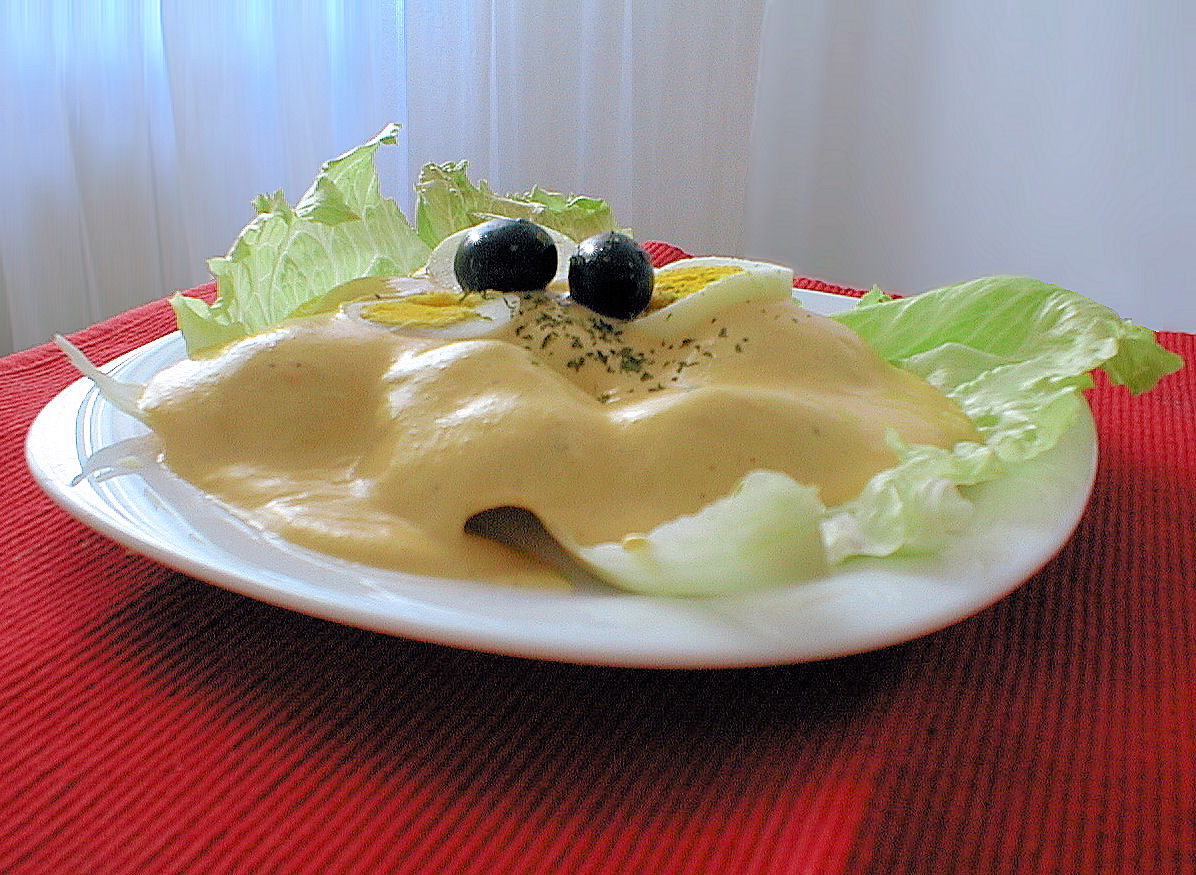
Papa a la huancaína.

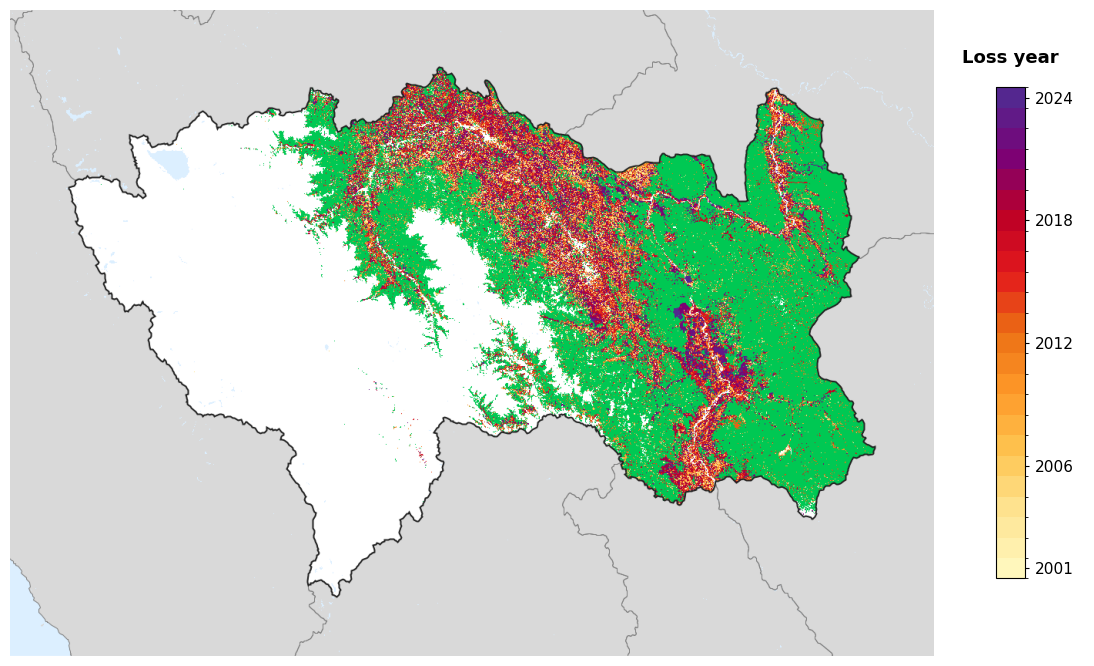
Tree-cover loss year in Junín, 2001-2024, from the Global Forest Change dataset.

The region has a very heterogeneous topography. The western range located near the border with the Lima Region, has snowy and ice-covered peaks. On the east, there are high glacier valleys which end up in high plateaus (Altiplano). Among them is the Junín Plateau that is located between the cities of La Oroya and Cerro de Pasco.

The Mantaro Valley becomes wider before Jauja up to the limit with the Huancavelica Region. This area concentrates a large share of the region's population. Towards the east, near the jungle, there is an abundance of narrow and deep canyons, with highly inclined hillsides, covered by woods under low-lying clouds.

The Waytapallana mountain range is located in the south central area of the region. This range holds a great fault which is the reason earthquakes happen in the area. The upper jungle, with valleys of great length, modelled by the Tulumayu, Pawqartampu, Perené and Ene rivers, is located on the eastern side of the region.

Lake Junin, the largest lake entirely within Peru, is located in the region, except for its northernmost tip which belongs to the Pasco Region. Junín Region is also home to Mount Toromocho.

It is rich in minerals, including silver, copper, mercury, bismuth, molybdenum, lead and coal.

=== Boundaries ===
The Junín Region borders the regions of Pasco in the north, Ucayali in the northeast and Cusco in the east. The Mantaro River marks the border of the region with the Ayacucho and Huancavelica regions in the south and in the west it is bordered by the Lima Region.

=== Climate ===
The Junín Region has an average annual temperature of 13.1 °C (56 °F), a maximum high of 17 °C (62 °F) and a minimum low of 0 °C (32 °F).

The rainy season runs from November to April, and from December to March in tropical areas.

== Political division ==
Map of provinces

The region is divided into nine provinces (Spanish: provincias, singular: provincia), which are composed of 123 districts (distritos, singular: distrito). The provinces and their capitals are:

Province	Seat
Chanchamayo	Chanchamayo
Chupaca	Chupaca
Concepción	Concepción
Huancayo	Huancayo
Jauja	Jauja
Junín	Junín
Satipo	Satipo
Tarma	Tarma
Yauli	La Oroya

== Demographics ==
=== Population ===
Census year	Population
1981	896,962
1993	1,092,993
2007	1,296,926
2017	1,316,894
2025	1,422,597

=== Languages ===
According to the 2007 Peru Census, the language learnt first by most of the residents was Spanish (86.63%) followed by Quechua (9.29%). The Quechua varieties spoken in Junín are Huanca Quechua (in the Southwest), Yaru Quechua (in the Northwest, especially in Tarma Province). The following table shows the results concerning the language learnt first in the Junín Region by province:

Province	Quechua	Aymara	Asháninka	Another native language	Spanish	Foreign language	Deaf or mute	Total
Chupaca	3,162	17	9	135	45,616	2	80	49,021
Concepción	3,986	18	8	47	52,293	5	113	56,470
Chanchamayo	14,723	131	5,965	729	136,580	17	201	158,346
Huancayo	52,904	286	119	494	386,622	84	428	440,937
Jauja	1,903	33	11	10	84,776	3	170	86,906
Junín	4,418	24	2	6	24,254	-	20	28,724
Satipo	18,433	264	30,945	6,148	122,661	19	186	178,656
Tarma	5,657	24	9	57	100,309	11	150	106,217
Yauli	1,826	21	4	37	45,050	6	36	46,980
Total	107,012	818	37,072	7,663	998,161	147	1,384	1,152,257
%	9.29	0.07	3.22	0.67	86.63	0.01	0.12	100.00

== History ==
Until the arrival of the Incas the eastern plains of the Junín region, known in Quechua as "Pampas," were inhabited by the Yanesha' and the Asháninka people, who lived a hunter-gatherer lifestyle and tended to be hostile towards outsiders. Meanwhile, the southwestern Mantaro Valley was inhabited by the Huancas. Sapa Inca Pachacuti conquered this region in 1460, bringing it under the domain of the Inca Empire. Huancayo became the region's main highway rest stop on the Inca Trail.

Woolen mills (known in Spanish as "obrajes" or "mills") were created during the viceroyalty, where the tissue and its craft became a tradition that continues today. On September 13, 1825, Simón Bolívar issued a decree creating what is now the Junín Region, to commemorate his victory in the Battle of Junín, the last real cavalry charge in South America where no shot was fired. Major events of national importance occurred during this period: Huancayo hosted the Assembly that issued the 1839 Constitution and on December 3, 1854, Ramón Castilla signed a decree that granted freedom to Afro-Peruvian slaves.

== Places of interest ==
- Asháninka Communal Reserve
- Chacamarca Historical Sanctuary
- Convent of Santa Rosa de Ocopa
- Gran Pajonal
- Nor Yauyos-Cochas Landscape Reserve
- Otishi National Park
- Pampa Hermosa Reserved Zone
