= Miraflores =

Miraflores is the name of several places in Spanish-speaking countries. It means "behold the flowers" or "flowers view" from mirar ("to look at, to watch") and flores ("flowers"). It is commonly used as a name for a region or neighborhood that is considered especially beautiful or ornate.

== Places ==
=== Caribbean ===
- Miraflores, Distrito Nacional, a sector in the city of Santo Domingo, Dominican Republic
- Miraflores, Añasco, Puerto Rico, a barrio
- Miraflores, Arecibo, Puerto Rico, a barrio

=== Europe ===
- Miraflores, a neighbourhood near Lisbon, Portugal
- Miraflores, a neighbourhood in Marbella, Spain
- Miraflores de la Sierra, a town and municipality in the Community of Madrid, Spain
- Miraflores, a neighbourhood and train station in Zaragoza, Spain

=== Mexico ===
- Miraflores, Baja California Sur, a town in the municipality of Los Cabos, Mexico

=== South America ===
- Miraflores, Catamarca, a village and municipality in Argentina
- Miraflores, Chaco, a village and municipality in Argentina
- Miraflores Private Neighborhood, in Garín, Greater Buenos Aires, Argentina
- Miraflores, La Paz, in Bolivia
- Miraflores (Chile), a residential suburb in Viña del Mar, Valparaíso Region, Chile
- Miraflores, Guaviare, a town and municipality in Colombia
- Miraflores, Boyacá, a town and municipality in Colombia
- Miraflores (Ecuador), a residential quarter in Ambato, Ecuador
- Miraflores, a city sector of Guayaquil, Ecuador
- Miraflores District (disambiguation), several districts in Peru

=== United States ===
- Miraflores, California, a community inside of Anaheim
- Miraflores Park, Texas, the historic garden of Aureliano Urrutia that is now an annex of Brackenridge Park in San Antonio, Texas

== Structures ==
- Miraflores Charterhouse, a Carthusian monastery in Burgos, Spain
- Miraflores (Panama), a lock in the Panama canal
- Miraflores Palace, in Caracas, the official workplace of the President of Venezuela
- Museo Miraflores, an archeological museum in Guatemala City

== Other uses ==
- Miraflores Altarpiece, a 15th-century triptych painted by Rogier van der Weyden
- Battle of Miraflores, in the Miraflores District of Lima, Peru
- CB Miraflores, a basketball club in Burgos, Spain
