= Putka =

Putka (Quechua for "muddy", also spelled potga or putca) may refer to:

- Putka (Lima), a mountain in the Lima Region, Peru
- Putka (Huánuco), a mountain in the Huánuco Region, Peru
- Putka (Junín), a mountain in the Junín Region, Peru
- Putka pods, the fruit of the Glochidion ferdinandi
