= Bertrand Flornoy =

French explorer and archaeologist

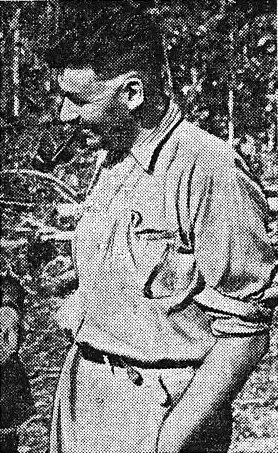
Bertrand Flornoy

Bertrand Flornoy (27 March 1910 – 25 April 1980) was a French explorer, archaeologist and politician.

== Life ==
Flornoy in 1936 became special advisor to the National Museum of Natural History, which sends mission studies and exploration in the Amazon Basin and the Andes.

Flornoy specialized in the Upper Amazon of Peru, and in 1941 and 1942 discovered the sources of the Marañón River, a constituent of the Amazon.

As an archaeologist, Flornoy was particularly interested in pre-Columbian civilisations and unearthed the remains of a pre-Incan civilisation. Of the 101 sites explored in the Tantamayo region, 25 were studied in particular in 1955 and 1956 in the company of Marc Corcos. Many of the monuments discovered, such as those at Piruro, Japallán, Selmín Granero and Susupillo, reveal a type of architecture previously unknown in South America (3- and 4-storey buildings).

Bertrand Flornoy and Marc Corcos discovered the ‘Empire of Yarovilca’, a hitherto unknown pre-Inca civilisation that had not been located since the Spanish conquest (‘Journal de la Société des Américanistes’, 1956: Volume 45, Number 45, Pp 237-238 / 1957: Volume 46, Number 46, Pp 207-226).

In 1937, Bertrand Flornoy was one of the founding members of the ‘Club des explorateurs français’, which later became the Société des explorateurs français. He was its president in 1946, then from 1948 to 1952 and from 1956 to 1980. A member of the Central Commission of the Geographical Society, he was also a member of the Explorers Club of New York.

=== Scientific and documentary works ===
Bertrand Flornoy wrote many books about his expeditions1.

According to André Chennevière, Bertrand Flornoy's ‘remarkable work on Amazonia’ has undeniable ‘scientific value’, but is less accessible than that of Ferreira de Castro.

Flornoy also made several documentary films between 1947 and 1953. In 1955 he made a sound recording about the Iawa and Bora Indians, which won him the Grand Prix du disque de l'Académie Charles-Cros.

=== MP for 15 years ===
Under the French Fifth Republic (1958-) created by President Charles de Gaulle (1958-1969), Bertrand Flornoy entered politics in 1959, becoming national youth delegate for the Union for the New Republic (UNR).

He was a Gaullist deputy for Seine-et-Marne from 1962 to 1978, and was re-elected three times. He was also mayor of Coulommiers in Seine-et-Marne.

== Works ==
Printed books are ordered by date of first publication.

- Upper Amazon, Paris, Plon, 1939, repr. Paris, Plon, 1953.
- Three French among the Indians gear heads, Paris, Plon, 1939, repr. Rio de Janeiro, Atlantica Editora, 1945, repr. Paris, Plon, 1953 (reissue common with Upper Amazon).
- Among the Indians of the Amazon, Paris, ed. I serve, 1943.
- Discovery of sources, from the Andes to the Amazon rainforest, Paris, I serve, 1946, repr. Paris, I serve, 1951.
- Sea ice in the jungle, collective work, Paris, Plon, 1952.
- IAWA, free people, Paris, Amiot-Dumont, 1953, repr. 1955.
- The headwaters of the Amazon, with Rouch Geneviève, Paris, F. Nathan, 1954.
- Inca Adventure, Paris, Amiot-Dumont, 1955, repr. Paris, History Book Club, 1955, repr. Paris, Perrin, 1963, repr. Paris, Perrin, 1980 ( ISBN 2-262-00204-5 )
- Archaeological exploration of the Alto Río Marañón (Río Marañón sources of the Rio Sarma), 1955.
- Mission in the Upper Amazon, 1956.
- At the forefront of exploration, Paris, Fayard, 1960.
- Amazon, Lands and men, finding sources, Paris, ed. Perrin, 1969, repr. Évreux, Circle bibliophile, 1970.
- Other: Various articles, forewords, contributions.

== Documentaries ==
- Indian highlands, Paris, 1947 .
- Conquest of the jungle, Paris, Empire, 1948 .
- My friend Ti, gear heads, Paris, Empire, 1948 .
- IAWA! at the heart of the Amazon, 1953.
