= Chuqi Chukchu =

Mountain in Peru

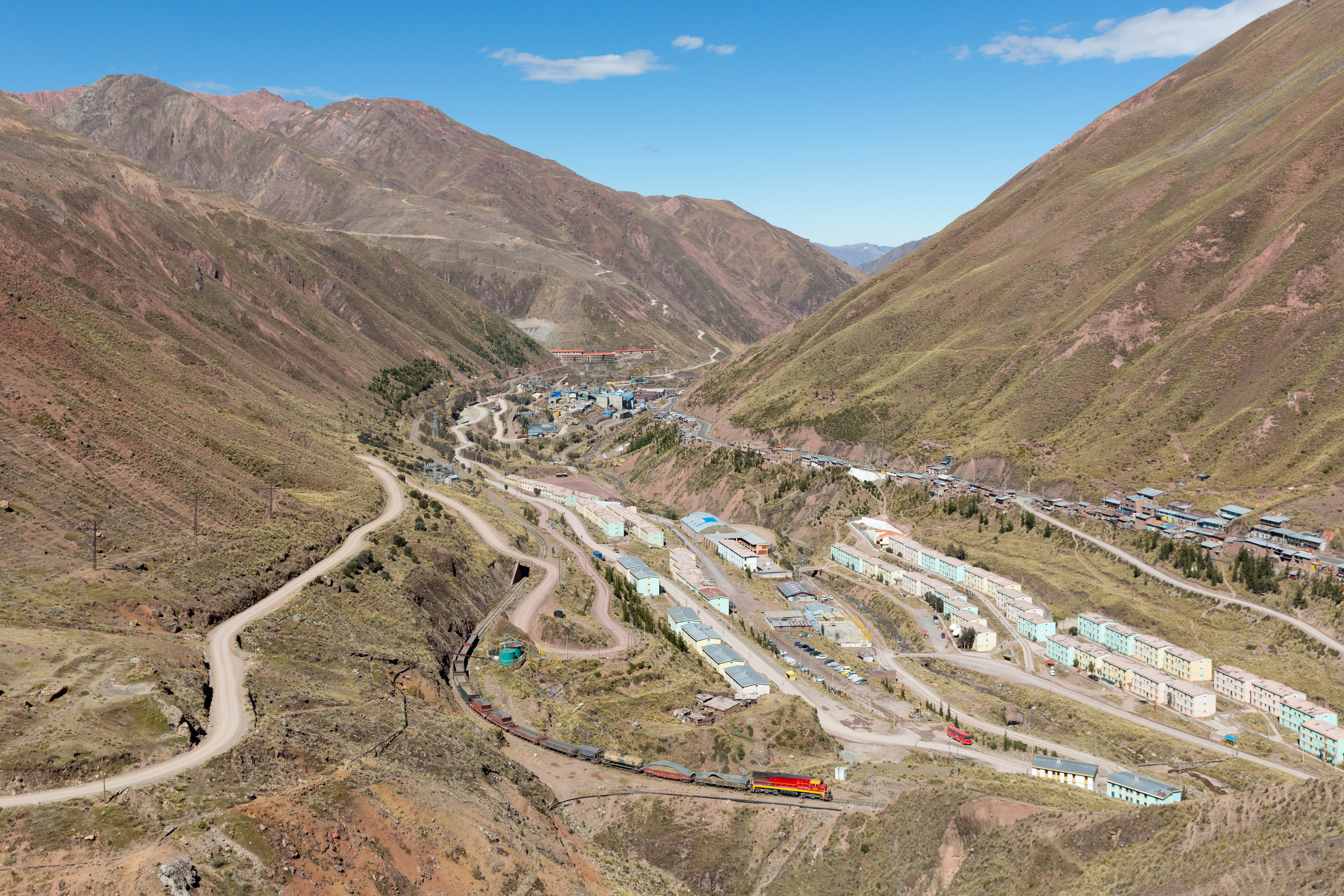
- The mining village of Q'asa P'allqa (Casapalca) with the eastern slope of Qanchis Kancha (on the right), the western slope of Chuqi Chukchu (on the left) and Quñuq P'ukru (in the background on the left) as seen from Jirish Mach'ay, looking to the south.

Highest point
- Elevation: 5,154 m (16,909 ft)
- Coordinates: 11°39′21″S 76°12′55″W

Geography
- Location within Peru
- Location: Peru, Lima Region
- Parent range: Andes, Cordillera Central

Chuqi Chukchu (Quechua chuqi metal, gold (<Aymara), every kind of precious metal, chukchu malaria, "gold malaria", Hispanicized spelling Chuquichuccho) is a 5,154-metre-high (16,909 ft) mountain in the Cordillera Central in the Andes of Peru. It is situated in the Lima Region, Huarochiri Province, Chicla District. Chuqi Chukchu lies near the Antikuna mountain pass, northwest of Wayrakancha and northeast of Quñuq P'ukru. The mining village of Q'asa P'allqa (Casapalca) lies at its feet.

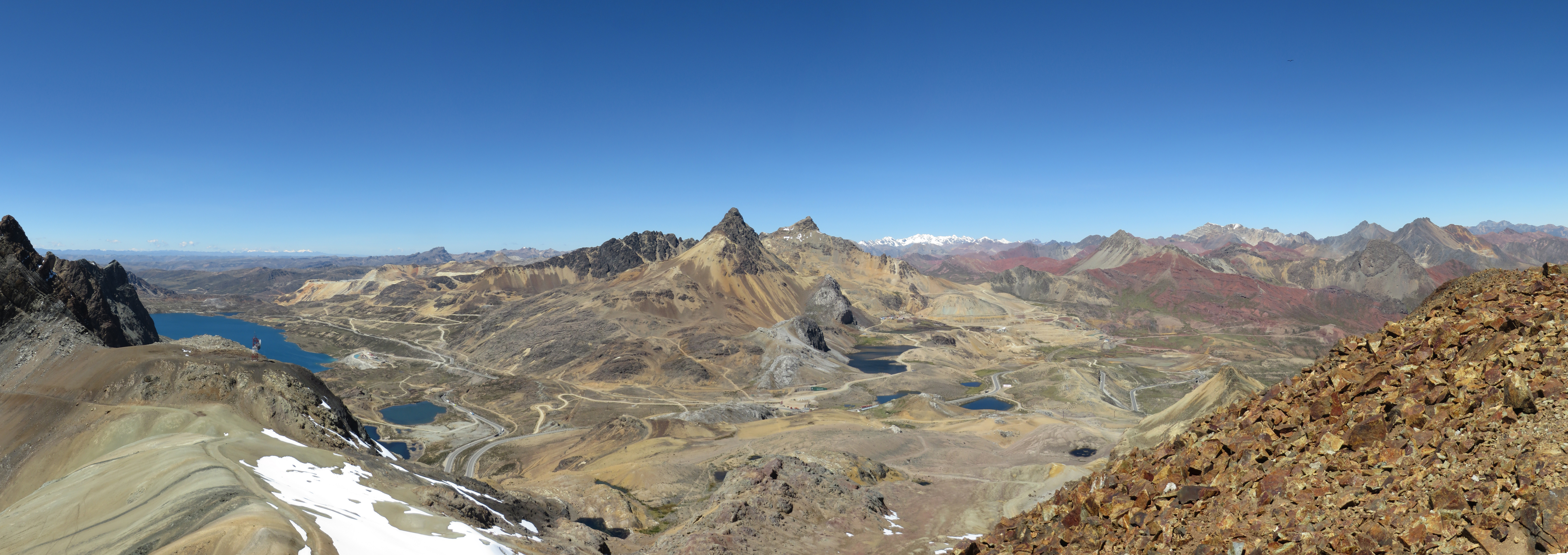
View from the summit of Yuraqqucha, looking to the southeast. Chuqi Chukchu is visible on the right
