= Quñuq P'ukru =

Mountain in Peru

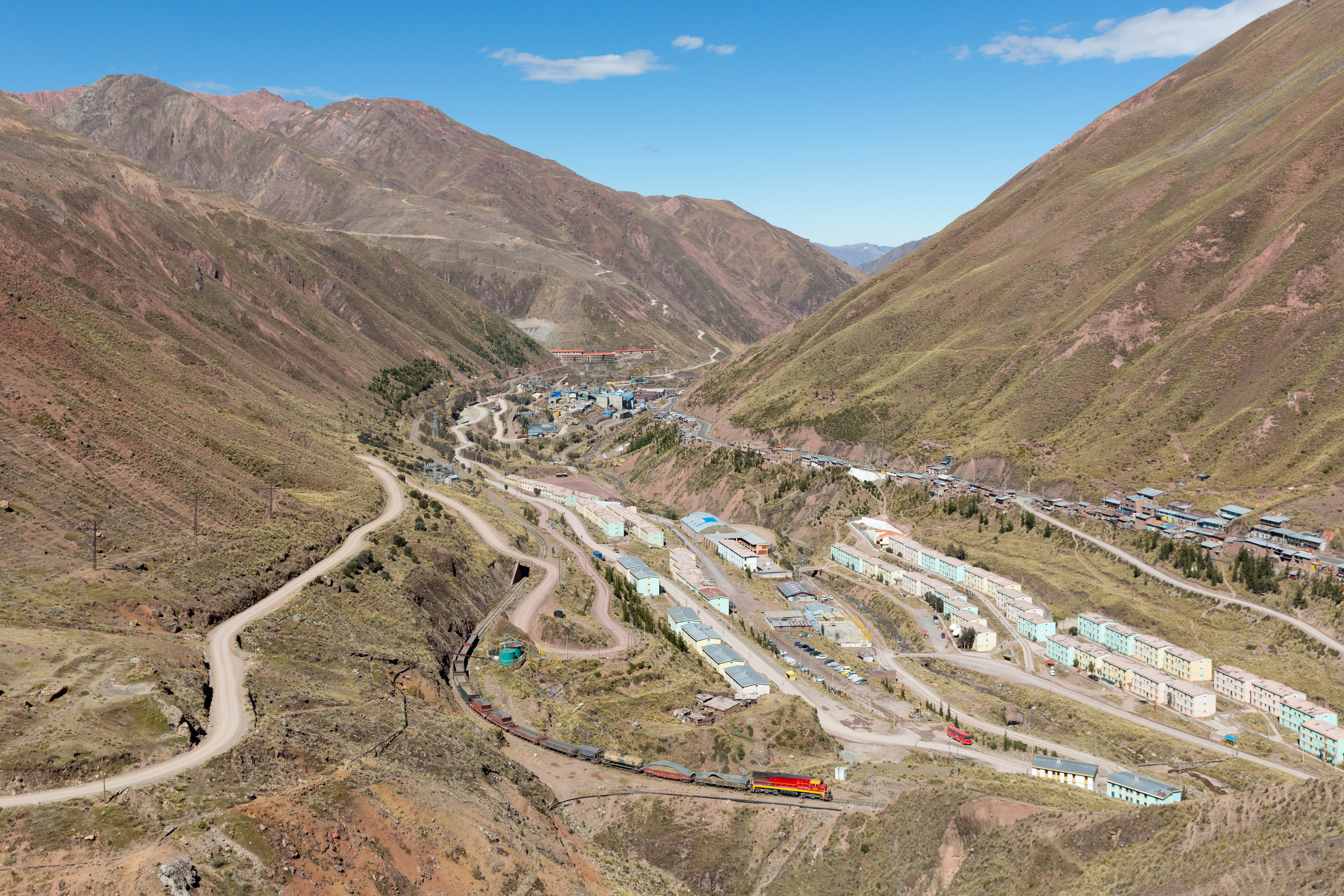
- The mining village of Q'asa P'allqa (Casapalca), Quñuq P'ukru (in the background on the left), the eastern slope of Qanchis Kancha (on the right) and the western slope of Chuqi Chukchu (on the left) as seen from Jirish Mach'ay, looking to the south.

Highest point
- Elevation: 5,000 m (16,000 ft)
- Coordinates: 11°41′13″S 76°14′05″W

Geography
- Location within Peru
- Location: Peru, Lima Region
- Parent range: Andes, Cordillera Central

Quñuq P'ukru (Quechua quñuq warm, lukewarm, p'ukru gorge; ravine; gully; hollow; valley, "warm gorge", Hispanicized spelling Joñojpucro) is a mountain in the Cordillera Central in the Andes of Peru, about 5,000 m (16,404 ft) high. It is situated in the Lima Region, Huarochirí Province, Chicla District.

Quñuq P'ukru lies northwest of Wayrakancha and Putka and west of a little lake named Putkaqucha (Quechua for "muddy lake", Hispanicized Lago Putca, Laguna Putca) which is located at 11°41′20″S 76°13′37″W.
