= Qarwaqucha (Huamalíes) =

Lake in Peru

- Location within Peru
- Location: Huanuco Region
- Coordinates: 9°37′50″S 76°59′52″W
- Basin countries: Peru

Qarwaqucha (Quechua qarwa leaf worm, larva of a beetle / pale / yellowish / golden, qucha lake, hispanicized spelling Carhuacocha) is a lake in Peru located in the Huanuco Region, Huamalíes Province, Llata District. It lies southwest of the lakes Yanaqucha and Saqraqucha, at the foot of the mountain Mishiwala (Mishihuala).

== See also ==
- List of lakes in Peru
