= Millpu =

Millpu (Quechua for throat, gullet, also spelled Millpo) may refer to:

- Millpu (Cajatambo), a mountain in the Cajatambo Province, Lima Region, Peru
- Millpu (Huánuco), a mountain in the Huánuco Region, Peru
- Millpu (Huarochirí), a mountain in the Huarochirí Province, Lima Region, Peru
