= Wat'a, Huánuco =

Archaeological site in Peru

Wat'a
- Interactive map of Wat'a
- Location: Peru, Huánuco Region, Huamalíes Province

Site notes
- Height: 3,889 metres (12,759 ft)
- Area: 4 ha (9.9 acres)

Wat'a (Quechua for island, Hispanicized spelling Huata) is an archaeological site in Peru. It lies in the Huánuco Region, Huamalíes Province, Singa District, in the little community of Bella Flores north of Singa. Wat'a is situated at a height of about 3,889 metres (12,759 ft) on top of a mountain which is bordered by the little rivers Tawlli (Taulli) and Aqu (Aco).

== See also ==
- Awila Qhincha Mach'ay
- Qillqay Mach'ay
