= Warmi Wañusqa (Huánuco) =

Mountain in Peru

- Location within Peru

Highest point
- Elevation: 4,400 m (14,400 ft)
- Coordinates: 9°37′28″S 76°55′45″W

Geography
- Location: Peru, Huánuco Region
- Parent range: Andes

Warmi Wañusqa (Quechua warmi woman, wife, wañusqa died, dead, "woman (who) died" or "dead woman", also spelled Huarmihuañusca) is a mountain in the Andes of Peru which reaches a height of approximately 4,400 m (14,436 ft). It is located in the Huánuco Region, Huamalíes Province, Llata District. A lake named Yanaqucha lies at its feet.
