= Wiqruqucha =

Wiqruqucha (Quechua for "bent lake") or Wiqrunqucha may refer to:

- Wiqrunqucha, a lake in the Asunción Province, Ancash Region, Peru
- Wiqruqucha (Mariscal Luzuriaga), a lake in the Mariscal Luzuriaga Province, Ancash Region, Peru
- Wiqruqucha (Huamalíes), a lake in the Huamalíes Province, Huánuco Region, Peru
- Wiqruqucha (Huaylas), a lake in the Huaylas Province, Ancash Region, Peru
