= Auquin Punta =

Archaeological site in Peru

- Interactive map of Auquin Punta
- 9°32′21″S 76°44′14″W
- Location: Peru, Huánuco Region, Huamalíes Province
- Region: Andes

Site notes
- Height: 3,932 m (12,900 ft)

Auquin Punta (possibly from Quechua Awkin Punta, awki prince; a mythical figure of the Andean culture; grandfather, -n a suffix, local Quechua punta peak; ridge; first, before, in front of, Hispanicized spelling Auquin Punta) is an archaeological site with stone tombs (chullpa) in Peru located in the Huánuco Region, Huamalíes Province, Jacas Grande District. It is situated at a height of about 3,932 m (12,900 ft) above the village of Carhuapata (Qarwapata).

== See also ==
- Miyu Pampa
