= List of football stadiums in Bolivia =

The following is a list of football stadiums in Bolivia, ordered by capacity.

== Current stadiums ==
#	Image	Stadium	Capacity	City	Home team(s)
1		Estadio Hernando Siles	41,143	La Paz	Bolivia, Club Bolivar, The Strongest
2		Estadio Ramón Tahuichi Aguilera	38,000	Santa Cruz de la Sierra	Oriente Petrolero, Club Blooming, Club Destroyers
3		Estadio Jesús Bermúdez	33,795	Oruro	Club San José
4		Estadio Víctor Agustín Ugarte	32,105	Potosí	Real Potosí, Nacional Potosí
5		Estadio Felix Capriles	32,000	Cochabamba	Club Jorge Wilstermann, Club Aurora
6		Estadio Olímpico Patria	30,700	Sucre	Club Universitario, Independiente Petrolero
7		Estadio Bicentenario de Villa Tunari	25,000	Villa Tunari	None
8		Estadio Ovidio Messa Soruco	25,000	Yacuiba	Club Petrolero
9		Estadio Roberto Jordán Cuéllar	24,000	Cobija	Universitario de Pando, Vaca Díez
10		Estadio Municipal de El Alto	22,000	El Alto	Club Always Ready
11		Estadio Edgar Peña Gutierrez	17,000	Santa Cruz	Sport Boys Warnes
12		Estadio IV Centenario	15,000	Tarija	Club Atlético Ciclón
13		Estadio Rafael Mendoza	14,000	La Paz	The Strongest
14		Estadio Gilberto Parada	13,000	Montero	Guabirá
15		Estadio Gran Mamoré	12,000	Trinidad	Municipal Real Mamoré

== See also ==
- List of South American stadiums by capacity
- List of association football stadiums by capacity
- Lists of stadiums
