= Qarwaqucha =

Qarwaqucha (Quechua for "yellowish lake", Hispanicized spellings Carhuacocha, Carhuaccocha, Caruacocha) may refer to:

- Qarwaqucha (Ancash), a mountain at a little lake of that name in the Ancash Region, Peru
- Qarwaqucha (Huamalíes), a lake in the Llata District, Huamalíes Province, Huánuco Region, Peru
- Qarwaqucha (Jesús-Queropalca), a lake in the districts Jesús and Queropalca, Lauricocha Province, Huánuco Region, Peru
- Qarwaqucha (Junín), a lake in the Junín Region, Peru
- Qarwaqucha (San Miguel de Cauri), a lake in the San Miguel de Cauri District, Lauricocha Province, Huánuco Region, Peru
