= Llata =

- Town
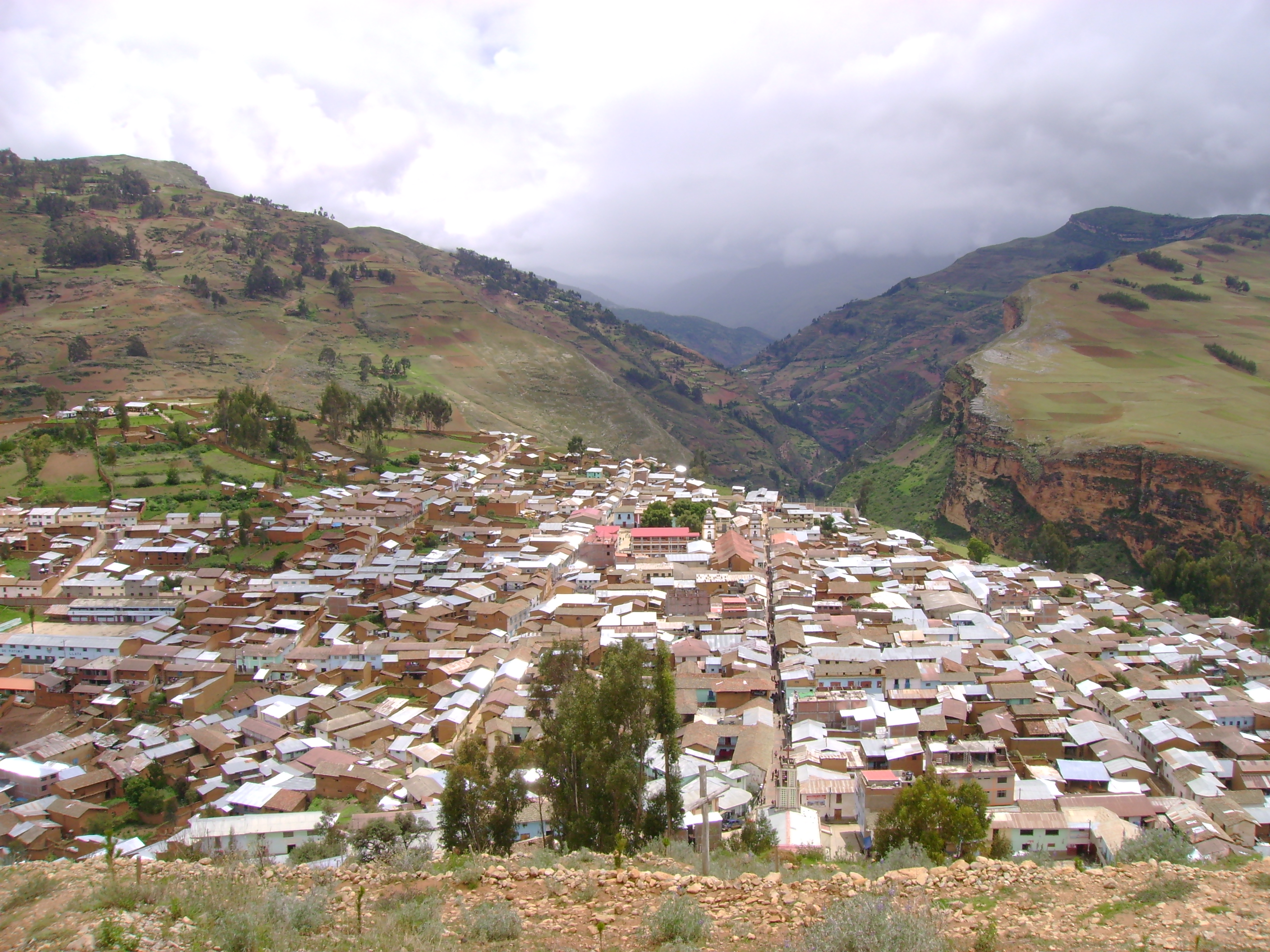

- Location within Peru
- Coordinates: 9.550°S 76.817°W
- Country: Peru
- Region: Huánuco
- Province: Huamalíes
- District: Llata
- Time zone: UTC-5 (PET)

Llata is a town in central Peru, capital of Huamalíes Province in Huánuco Region.
