= Piruro =

Archaeological site in Peru

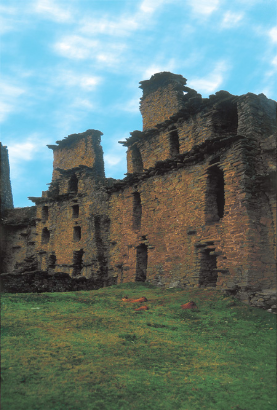
- Partial view of the site.

- Location within Peru
- 9°22′43.98″S 76°42′16.44″W
- Location: Huamalíes Province, Huánuco

Piruro (possibly from Quechua for whorl) is an archaeological site in Peru. It is situated in the Huánuco Region, Huamalíes Province, Tantamayo District. The site was declared a National Cultural Heritage by Resolución Directoral No. 533/INC on June 18, 2002.

The complex consists of two parts named Piruro I and Piruro II. This archaeological zone has had a long occupation: Its first vestiges date from 3000 to 2500 years B.C. (Final Preceramic), and they extend until the Inca Empire (Late Horizon).

The Fortress of Piruro II can be found on the right side of the river Tantamayo over 3.8 km above sea level. The first archaeological inspections of the fortress happened during the explorations of Bertrand Flornov around the years 1957 and 1975, and excavations are attributed to Lois Girault between 1968 and 1970, the carbon dating from those examinations give a date between 1930 and 2100 years B.C., meaning this fortress was built in the pre-ceramic period. Girault found architectonic remnants of hewn stones that seem similar to those found in Kotosh and certain walls located in Chavin. The fortress is composed of walls built with stones hewn in squared shape and uniform size. The building is a five-story structure with rectangular doors and windows on its front area. In front of the building, there is a spacious open area that resembles a park. At the center of this area, there are remnants of a stone and mud structure that are partially buried underground. Currently the building is enclosed by stone walls measuring approximately 1 1/2 meters in height. Two rectangular doors protrude from these walls, providing access to the interior. Adjacent to the building, there is also a 4-meter-high stone tower. This tower is situated near a section of the structure's rear where some stones bulge out, that were used as a makeshift ladder.

== See also ==
- Anku
- Isog
- Susupillo
- Huankarán
- Andean preceramic
- Kotosh Religious Tradition
