= Anku =

Archaeological site in Peru

- Ango
- Interactive map of Anku
- 9°21′S 76°35′W
- Type: Citadel
- Cultures: Yarovilca, Incas
- Associated with: Extensive Inca administrative and ceremonial centers characteristic of the culture's architectural and societal organization. The Inca Empire made use of such sites for administration, ceremonies, and regional control, integrating them into their vast road and governance network.
- Location: Peru, Huánuco Region, Huamalíes Province
- Region: Andes

Site notes
- Height: 3,900 metres (12,795 ft)
- Area: 1km
- Excavation dates: between 1956 and 1957
- Archaeologists: Louis Girault, Bertrand Flornoy
- Public access: Open
- Website: Official site

Anku in Aymara meaning "indomitable, unstoppable"; (Quechua for slim (person), elastic, flexible, tendon, nerve. Hispanicized spelling Ango) is an archaeological site in Peru. It is situated in the Huánuco Region, Huamalíes Province, Tantamayo District, at a height of about 3,900 metres (12,795 ft). The site was declared a National Cultural Heritage by Resolución Directoral No. 533/INC on June 18, 2002.

== See also ==
- Isog
- Piruro
- Susupillo
- Huankarán
