= Urpish =

Archaeological site in Peru

- Location within Peru
- 9°17′S 76°44′W
- Location: Peru, Huánuco Region, Huamalíes Province
- Region: Andes

Site notes
- Height: 3,474 m (11,398 ft)

Urpish (Quechua) is an archaeological site in Peru located in the Huánuco Region, Huamalíes Province, Jircan District. It is situated above the village of Urpish at a height of about 3,474 metres (11,398 ft). The site with 6 m (20 ft) to 8 m (26 ft) high rectangular stone structures is surrounded by an 8 m (26 ft) to 10 m (33 ft) high wall. Some of the stony walls are covered with petroglyphs showing spiral figures and human faces.

== See also ==
- Awqa Punta
- Miyu Pampa
