= Isog =

Archaeological site in Peru

- Location within Peru
- 9°23′32.4″S 76°41′33.5″W
- Location: Huamalíes Province, Huánuco Region

Isog (possibly from Quechua isu skin sickness caused by a certain mite (mange), -q a suffix) is an archaeological site in Peru. It is situated in the Huánuco Region, Huamalíes Province, Tantamayo District. The site was declared a National Cultural Heritage by Resolución Directoral No. 533/INC on June 18, 2002.

Isog lies on the northern slope of the mountain Susupillo, which is also the name of the archaeological site south of Isog.

== See also ==
- Anku
- Piruro
- Huankarán
