= Arancay District =

Coordinates: 9.1710°S 76.7515°W

Arancay
- District
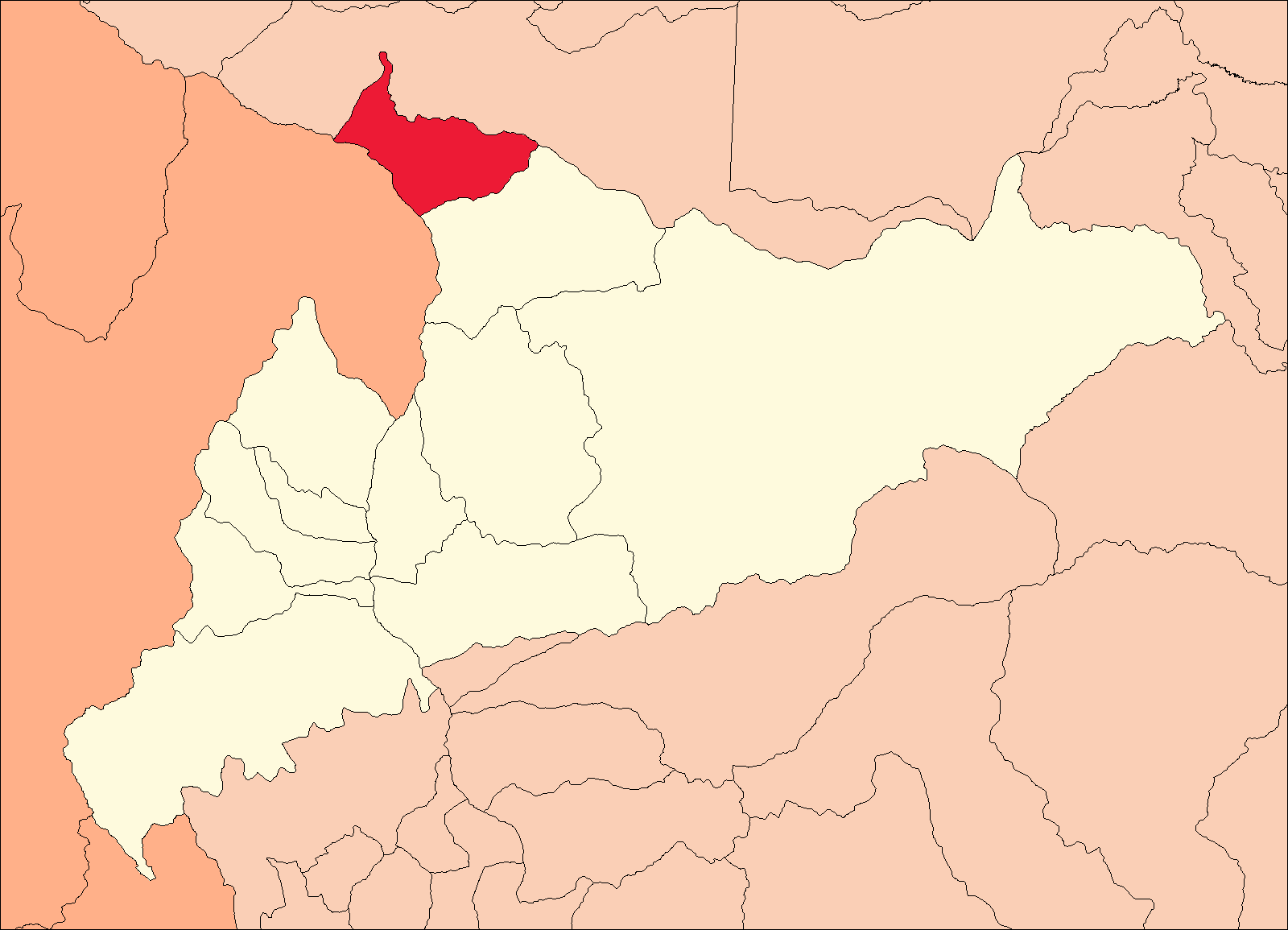
- Location of Arancay in the Huamalíes province
- Country: Peru
- Region: Huánuco
- Province: Huamalíes
- Founded: January 2, 1857
- Capital: Arancay

Government
  - Mayor: Odion Lucas Trujillo

Area
  - Total: 158.33 km^{2} (61.13 sq mi)
- Elevation: 3,050 m (10,010 ft)

Population (2005 census)
  - Total: 2,053
  - Density: 12.97/km^{2} (33.58/sq mi)
- Time zone: UTC-5 (PET)
- UBIGEO: 100502

Arancay District is one of eleven districts of the province Huamalíes in Peru.

== See also ==
- Kinwaqucha
