= Hernando Siles Stadium =

Stadium in La Paz, Bolivia

Coordinates: 16°29′58″S 68°07′22″W

Estadio Hernando Siles
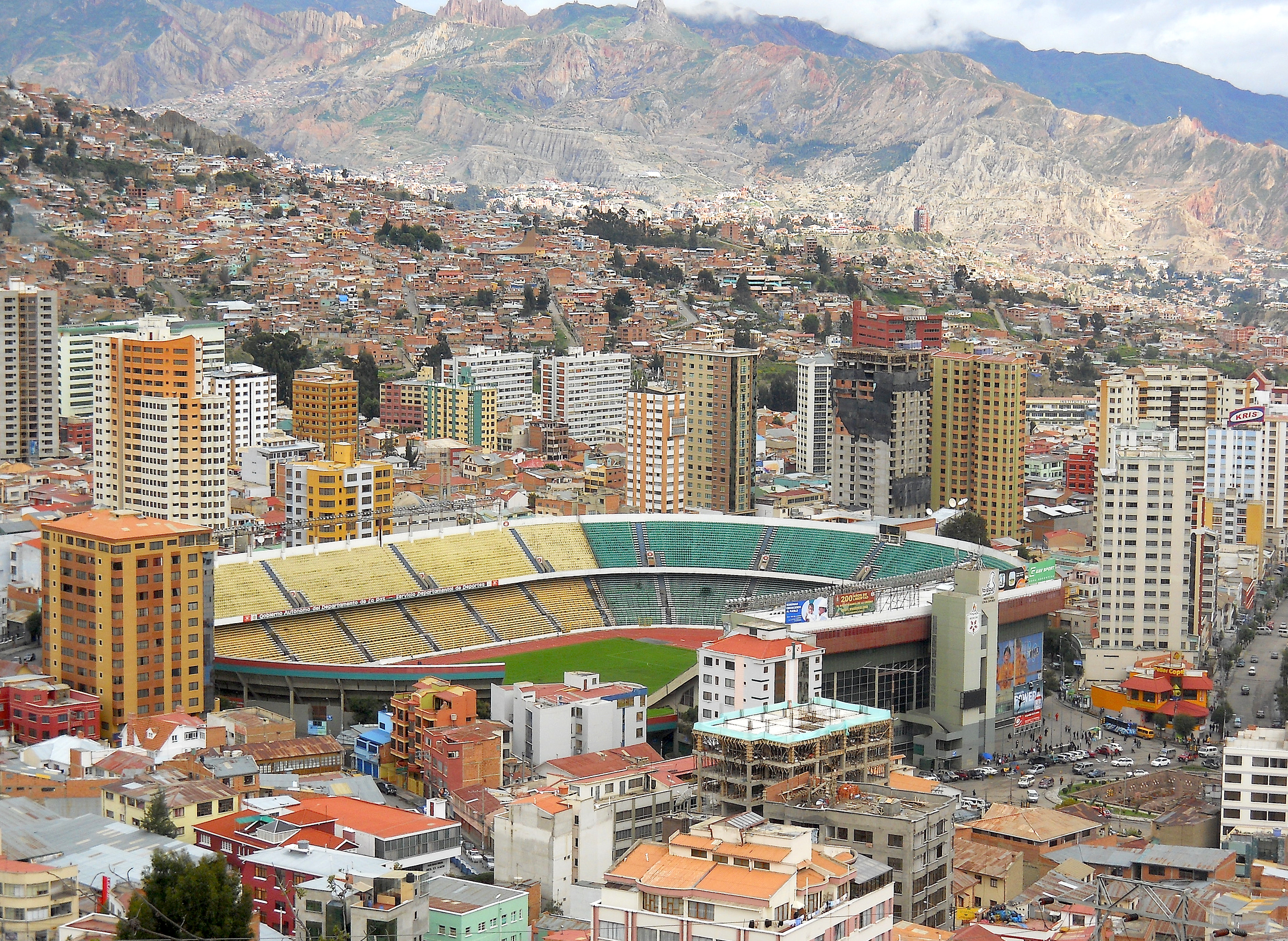
- Estadio Hernando Siles in February 2011
- Interactive map of Estadio Hernando Siles
- Full name: Estadio Hernando Siles
- Location: Avenida Saavedra, La Paz, Bolivia
- Elevation: 3,582 m (11,752 ft)
- Operator: SEDEDE
- Capacity: 41,143; 37,029 (international)
- Surface: Grass
- Scoreboard: Electronic
- Record attendance: 60,000
- Field size: 68 m * 105m

Construction
- Opened: 1930
- Renovated: 1977

Tenants
- Bolivia national football team (1930 - 2023); Bolívar; The Strongest; Universitario de La Paz; Chaco Petrolero; Mariscal Braun; Fraternidad Tigres; Academia de Balompié Boliviano; Club 31 de Octubre; Internacional de La Paz

Hernando Siles Stadium (Spanish: Estadio Hernando Siles, [esˈtaðjo eɾˈnando ˈsiles]), also known as Estadio Olímpico La Paz, is a multi-purpose stadium in La Paz, Bolivia. It is the country's largest stadium, with a capacity of 41,143 seats. It is named after Hernando Siles Reyes (1882–1942), the 31st President of Bolivia (1926–1930). Its biggest attendance was in 03/03/1989 during the match between Bolívar and Danubio, with 60,000 fans in attendance. (Copa Libertadores)

The stadium is located in the Miraflores borough of La Paz, at an altitude of 3,582 meters (11,752 feet) above sea level, making it one of the highest professional stadiums in the world. Opened in 1930, it is the home ground of three major Bolivian league football clubs; Club Bolívar, The Strongest and La Paz F.C., as well as several smaller top sides: Universitario de La Paz, Chaco Petrolero and Mariscal Braun. The stadium also hosts lower league clubs: Fraternidad Tigres and Academia de Balompié Boliviano.

== History ==
The stadium was officially opened on 16 January 1930 with a match between The Strongest and its classic rival, Universitario, with The Strongest winning 4–1.

The stadium hosted some games of the 1963 South American Championship, which Bolivia won. The Recopa Sudamericana de Clubes was played here in 1970 between Mariscal Santa Cruz and El Nacional. In 1975, the stadium was rebuilt for the 1977 Bolivarian Games. After the rebuild, its capacity was doubled, and lighting was improved. In 2007, it became an all-seater stadium, and its capacity was reduced as a result.

Estadio Hernando Siles has been the site of significant moments in Bolivian football history, including Bolivia's 2–0 defeat of Brazil, which was Brazil's first defeat in 40 years of playing the qualifiers, and 7–0 defeat of Venezuela, both in the 1994 World Cup qualifiers; these results eventually helped Bolivia to historically qualify for the 1994 World Cup in USA. The stadium also hosted Bolivia's games in the 1997 Copa América, including the final, where Bolivia lost to Brazil.

Bolívar played the first leg of the 2004 Copa Sudamericana Finals against Boca Juniors at this stadium and won 1–0. However Boca eventually won the competition after a 2–0 win in La Bombonera.

On 1 April 2009, Bolivia defeated Argentina 6–1, inflicting the worst defeat for Argentina in 60 years. 6 months later, on October 11 (in the same competition, 2010 World Cup qualifiers), Bolivia defeated Brazil 2–1.

== FIFA altitude ban ==
Until May 2007, FIFA, football's international governing body, accepted the stadium as a World Cup Qualifying venue, despite protests from visiting teams that the altitude gave Bolivia an unfair advantage against opponents who had only a few days to acclimatise before playing. On 27 May 2007, FIFA declared that no World Cup Qualifying matches could be played in stadiums above 2,500 meters (8,200 ft) above sea level. Some, including Bolivian President Evo Morales and Diego Maradona, reacted by claiming the new measure discriminated primarily against high-altitude nations in Latin America, especially those in the Andes. The "Hernando Siles" became a symbol of the Bolivian struggle against FIFA's ban on games at high altitude. After a month of campaigning against the ban, FIFA raised the altitude limit from 2500 meters to 3000 meters on 27 June 2007. The next day, FIFA also announced a special exemption for the Estadio Hernando Siles, allowing the stadium to continue holding World Cup qualifying matches. The ban was revoked in May 2008.

During the 2006, 2010, 2014 and 2018 World Cup qualifiers, Bolivia had fourteen home wins and ten home draws, and only two away draws and no away wins.

In 2017, Neymar posted photos of Brazil players with oxygen masks before their 2018 World Cup qualification game in the stadium and commented that it is "inhumane" to play under those conditions.

== Events ==
Mexican pop group RBD kicked-off their Gira del Adiós World Tour at the stadium on November 1, 2008.

Enrique Iglesias held a concert at the stadium on July 2, 2011, during his Euphoria Tour.

American rock band Guns N' Roses played a concert at the stadium on April 12, 2014, during their South American tour.

== See also ==
- List of football stadiums in Bolivia
- Lists of stadiums

Preceded by Centenario Stadium; Montevideo	Copa América; Final Venue; 1997	Succeeded by Estadio Defensores del Chaco; Asunción
