= Punchao District =

Coordinates: 9.4622°S 76.8197°W

Punchao Punchaw
- District
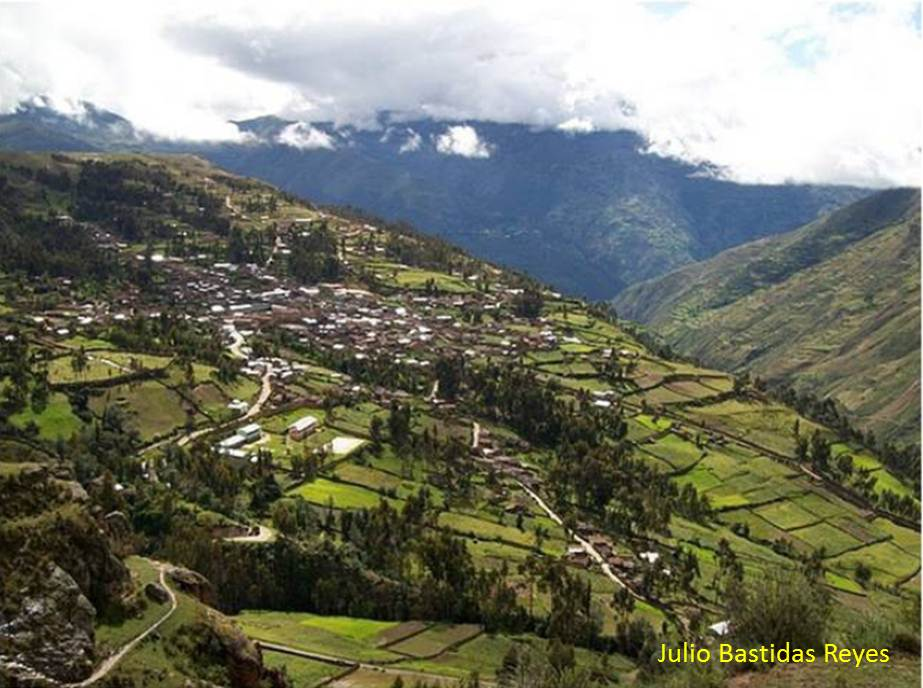
- Punchao
- Interactive map of Punchao
- Country: Peru
- Region: Huánuco
- Province: Huamalíes
- Founded: October 7, 1942
- Capital: Punchao

Government
  - Mayor: Pompeyo Macario Timoteo Cadillo

Area
  - Total: 42.24 km^{2} (16.31 sq mi)
- Elevation: 3,534 m (11,594 ft)

Population (2005 census)
  - Total: 2,542
  - Density: 60.18/km^{2} (155.9/sq mi)
- Time zone: UTC-5 (PET)
- UBIGEO: 100508

Punchao or Punchaw (Quechua for "day") is one of eleven districts of the province Huamalíes in Peru.

== Ethnic groups ==
The people in the district are mainly indigenous citizens of Quechua descent. Quechua is the language which the majority of the population (67.09%) learnt to speak in childhood, 32.22% of the residents started speaking using the Spanish language (2007 Peru Census).
