= Llata District =

Coordinates: 9.5506°S 76.8170°W

Llata
- District
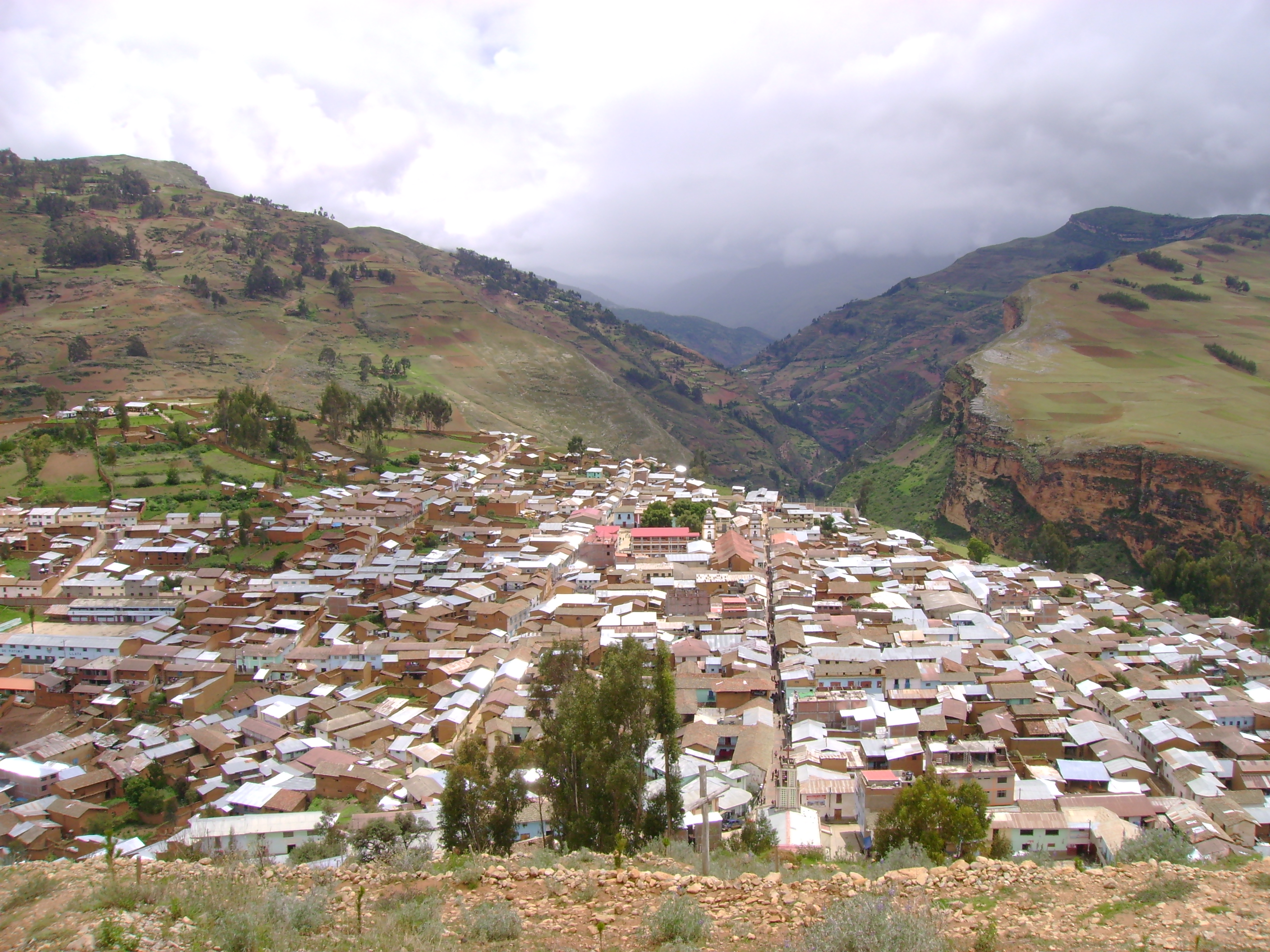
- Llata

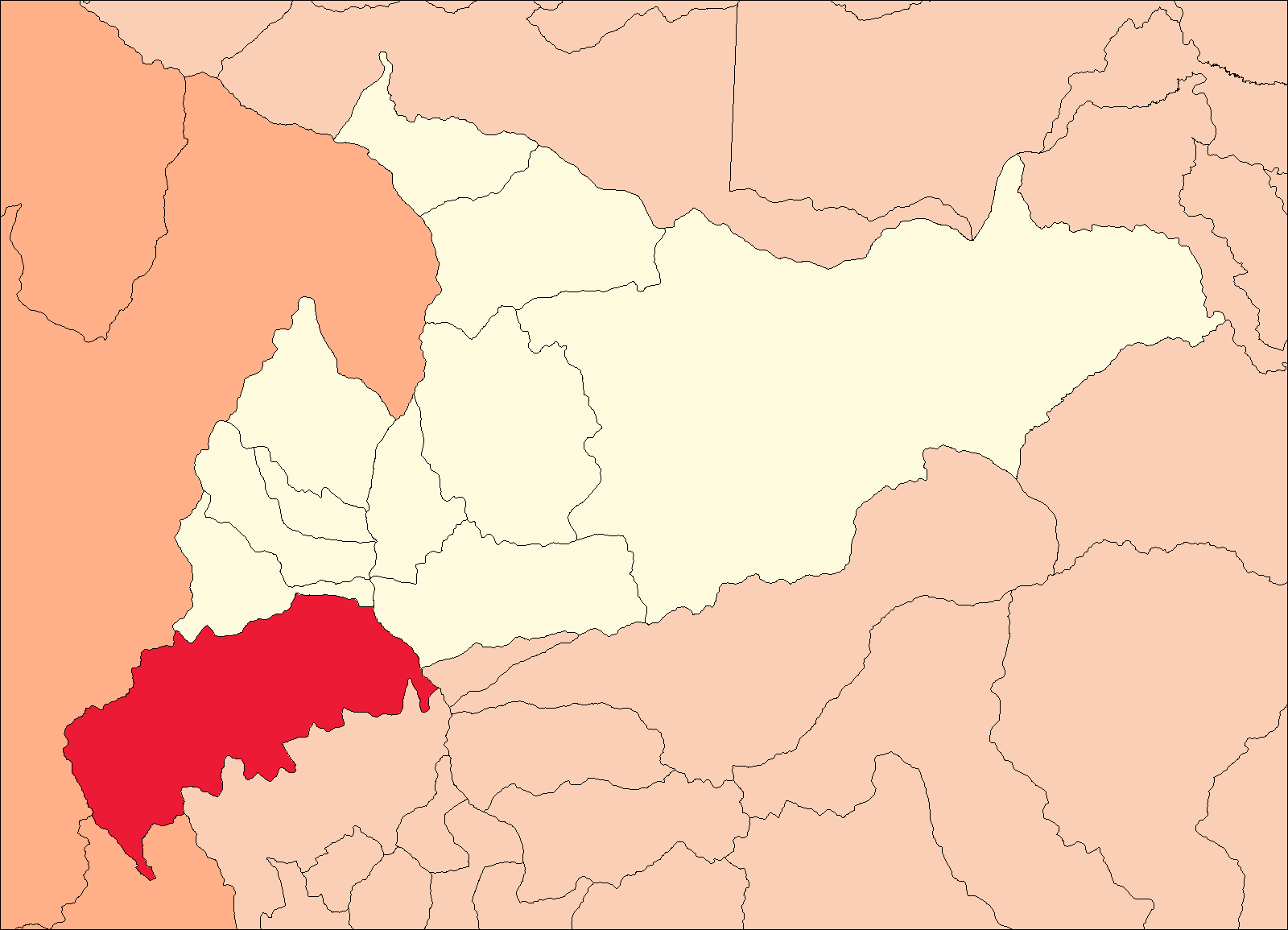
- Location of Llata in the Huamalíes Province
- Country: Peru
- Region: Huánuco
- Province: Huamalíes
- Capital: Llata

Government
  - Mayor: Eduardo Grover Quino Herrera

Area
  - Total: 411.35 km^{2} (158.82 sq mi)
- Elevation: 3,439 m (11,283 ft)

Population (2005 census)
  - Total: 14,660
  - Density: 35.64/km^{2} (92.30/sq mi)
- Time zone: UTC-5 (PET)
- UBIGEO: 100501

Llata District is one of eleven districts of the Huamalíes Province in Peru.

== Geography ==
One of the highest peaks of the district is Millwa Pillu at approximately 4,600 m (15,100 ft). Other mountains are listed below:

- Aqullan
- Artisa Ukru
- Hatun K’uchu
- Inti Punku
- Mama Hirka
- Marayniyuq
- Minas Puchka
- Minas Punta
- Pawqar
- Pilanku
- P'itiq Punta
- Tinyaq
- Usnu Rumi
- Waman Willka
- Warmi Wañusqa
- Yanama

== Ethnic groups ==
The people in the district are mainly indigenous citizens of Quechua descent. Quechua is the language which the majority of the population (50.46%) learnt to speak in childhood, 49.12% of the residents started speaking using the Spanish language (2007 Peru Census).

== See also ==
- K'ipakhara
- Qarwaqucha
- Saqraqucha
- Yanaqucha
