= K'ipakhara =

Archeological site

- Location: Peru, Huánuco Region, Huamalíes Province
- Region: Andes

Site notes
- Height: 3,600 m (11,800 ft)

K'ipakhara (Quechua k'ipa decomposed rests of plants in the field used as fertilizer, khara dung, Hispanicized spelling Quepacara) is an archaeological site in Peru. It is situated in the Huánuco Region, Huamalíes Province, Llata District. K'ipakhara lies south-east of Llata, near the village of Milpo, at a height of about 3,600 m (11,800 ft).
