= Auga Punta =

Archaeological site in Peru

- Location within Peru
- 9°16′8.61″S 76°42′24.48″W
- Location: Huánuco Region, Huamalíes Province, Peru

Auga Punta (possibly from Quechua awqa enemy, opponent, rival; Spanish punta peak) is an archaeological site in Peru located in the Huánuco Region, Huamalíes Province, Jircan District. It is situated at an elevation of ca. 3,700 m (12,100 ft) on a mountain named Jircán, near the village of Urpish.

== See also ==
- Miyu Pampa
- Urpish
