= Kinwaqucha (Huánuco) =

Mountain in Peru

- Location within Peru
- Location: Peru; Huánuco Region
- Coordinates: 9°04′44″S 76°47′02″W

Kinwaqucha (Quechua kinwa quinoa, qucha lake, "quinoa lake", also spelled Quinuacocha) is a lake in the Huánuco Region of Peru at a mountain of that name. It is located in the Huacaybamba Province, Cochabamba District, and in the Huamalíes Province, Arancay District.

The mountain named Kinwaqucha lies northwest of the lake at 9°04′11″S 76°47′27″W. It reaches a height of approximately 4,200 m (13,780 ft). It belongs to the Cochabamba District.
