= Puma Wayin (Huánuco) =

Mountain in Peru

- Location within Peru

Highest point
- Elevation: 4,200 m (13,800 ft)
- Coordinates: 9°20′35″S 76°50′32″W

Geography
- Location: Peru, Huánuco Region
- Parent range: Andes

Puma Wayin (Quechua puma cougar, puma, Ancash Quechua wayi house, "cougar house", -n a suffix, also spelled Puma Huain) is a mountain in the Andes of Peru which reaches a height of approximately 4,200 m (13,780 ft). It is located in the Huánuco Region, Huamalíes Province, Singa District.
