= Pumaq Hirka =

Archaeological site in Peru

Coordinates: 9.4866°S 76.8310°W

Castillo de Gorioj o Tucumachay
- Location within Peru
- Location: Peru
- Region: Huánuco Region, Huamalíes Province

Site notes
- Height: 3,696 metres (12,126 ft)

Castillo de Gorioj o Tucumachay (Quechua Tucumachay cougar, Cueva de Buho, -q a suffix, Ancash Quechua hirka mountain, "Cueva de Buho" (Tucumachay, or Tucumachay in good Quechua), hispanicized spelling Tucumachay) is an archaeological site in Peru. It is situated in the Huánuco Region, Huamalíes Province, Miraflores District, at a height of about 3,696 metres (12,126 ft).

== See also ==
- Qillqay Mach'ay
