= Jacas Grande District =

Coordinates: 9.5397°S 76.7371°W

Jacas Grande
- District
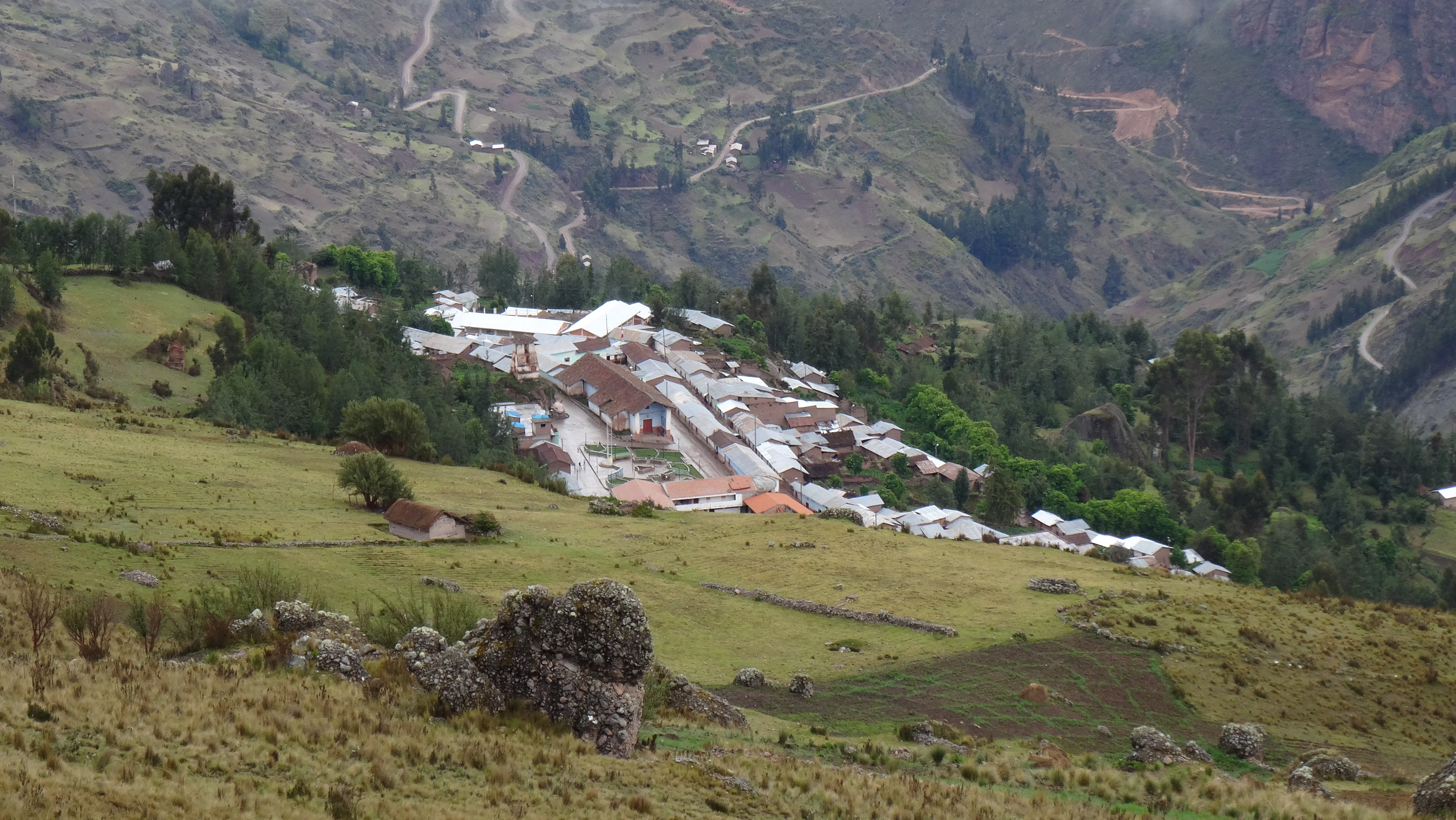
- Jacas Grande
- Interactive map of Jacas Grande
- Country: Peru
- Region: Huánuco
- Province: Huamalíes
- Founded: October 29, 1923
- Capital: Jacas Grande

Government
  - Mayor: Romer Trinidad Rojas

Area
  - Total: 236.99 km^{2} (91.50 sq mi)
- Elevation: 3,615 m (11,860 ft)

Population (2005 census)
  - Total: 6,923
  - Density: 29.21/km^{2} (75.66/sq mi)
- Time zone: UTC-5 (PET)
- UBIGEO: 100504

Jacas Grande District is one of eleven districts of the Huamalíes Province in Peru.

== Geography ==
One of the highest peaks of the district is Kuntur Puñunan at approximately 4,600 m (15,100 ft). Other mountains are listed below:

- Llama Llama
- Millpu
- Misa Pata Punta
- Pishtaq Punta
- Putka Rumi
- Puywan
- Qisqi Punta
- Qucha Qaqa
- Q'iru Q'iru
- Sawan Punta
- Waka Mach'ay Punta
- Yana Mach'ay

== Ethnic groups ==
The people in the district are mainly indigenous citizens of Quechua descent. Quechua is the language which the majority of the population (80.07%) learnt to speak in childhood, 19.22% of the residents started speaking using the Spanish language (2007 Peru Census).

== See also ==
- Awkin Punta
