= Tikti Mach'ay =

Mountain in Peru

- Location within Peru

Highest point
- Elevation: 5,000 m (16,000 ft)
- Coordinates: 11°35′39″S 76°12′48″W

Geography
- Location: Peru, Lima Region
- Parent range: Andes

Tikti Mach'ay (Quechua tikti wart, mach'ay cave, "wart cave", Hispanicized spelling Tictimachay) is a mountain in the Andes of Peru, about 5,000 metres (16,404 ft) high. It is situated in the Lima Region, Huarochiri Province, Chicla District. Tikti Mach'ay is near the Antikuna mountain pass, southeast of the peak of Yuraqqucha, northeast of Jirish Mach'ay and west of Waqraqucha. Tiktiqucha lies at its feet.
