= Monzón District =

Coordinates: 9.2796°S 76.3960°W

Monzón
- District
- Interactive map of Monzón
- Country: Peru
- Region: Huánuco
- Province: Huamalíes
- Founded: January 2, 1857
- Capital: Monzón

Government
  - Mayor: Iburcio Morales Baltazar

Area
  - Total: 1,521.39 km^{2} (587.41 sq mi)
- Elevation: 920 m (3,020 ft)

Population (2005 census)
  - Total: 18,460
  - Density: 12.13/km^{2} (31.43/sq mi)
- Time zone: UTC-5 (PET)
- UBIGEO: 100507

Monzón District is one of eleven districts of the province Huamalíes in Peru.
