= Singa District =

Coordinates: 9.3673°S 76.7926°W

Singa Sinqa
- District
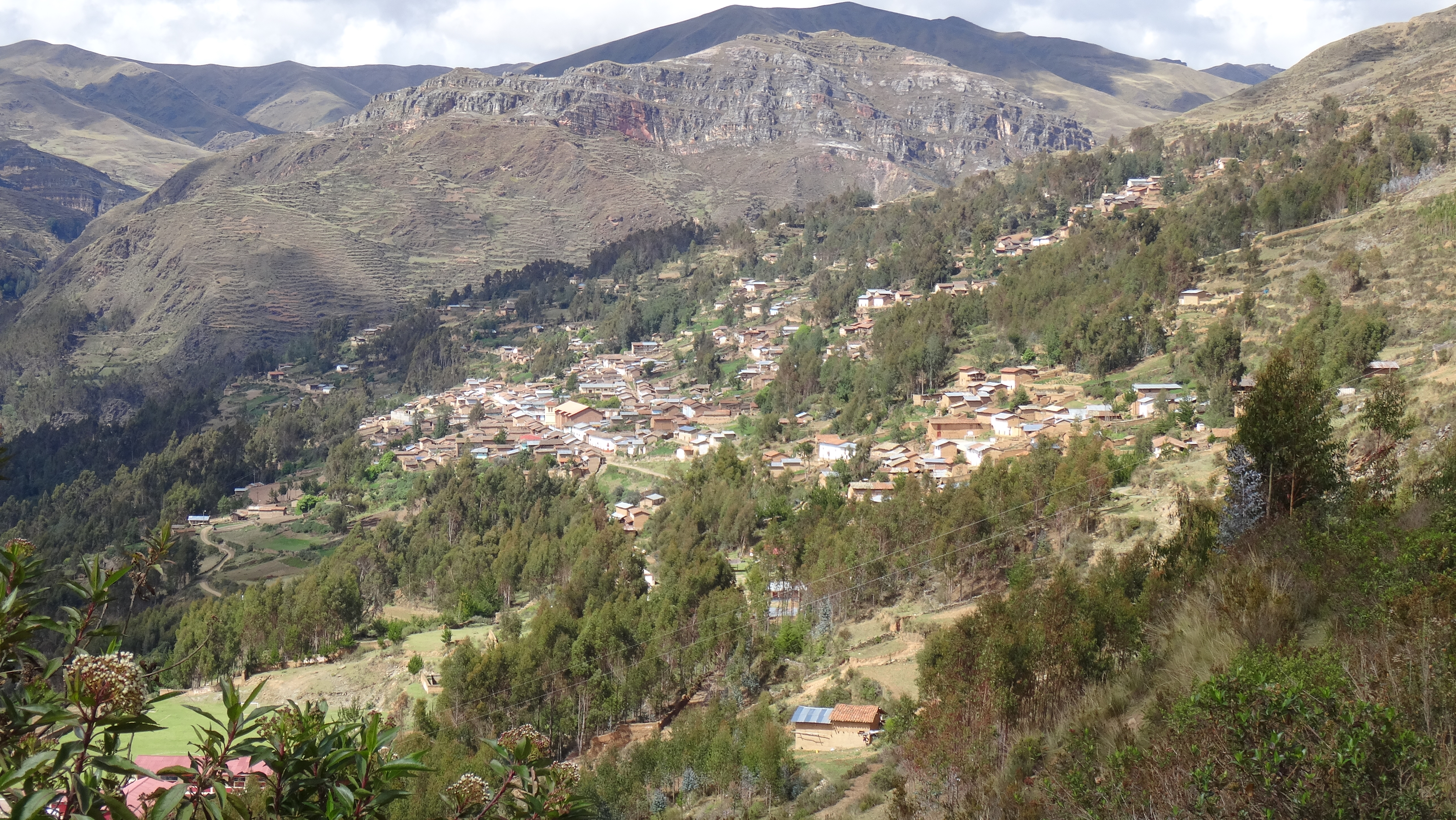
- Interactive map of Singa
- Country: Peru
- Region: Huánuco
- Province: Huamalíes
- Capital: Singa

Government
  - Mayor: Pedro Celestino Collazos Villavicencio

Area
  - Total: 151.7 km^{2} (58.6 sq mi)
- Elevation: 3,615 m (11,860 ft)

Population (2005 census)
  - Total: 4,395
  - Density: 28.97/km^{2} (75.04/sq mi)
- Time zone: UTC-5 (PET)
- UBIGEO: 100510

Singa or Sinqa (Quechua for nose) is one of eleven districts of the province Huamalíes in Peru.

== Ethnic groups ==
The people in the district are mainly indigenous citizens of Quechua descent. Quechua is the language which the majority of the population (80.39%) learnt to speak in childhood, 18.97% of the residents started speaking using the Spanish language (2007 Peru Census).

== See also ==
- Awila Qhincha Mach'ay
- Millpu
- Puma Wayin
- Qaqa Mach'ay
- Qillqay Mach'ay
- Wat'a
