= Challwaqucha (Yauyos) =

Lake in Peru

- Location within Peru
- Location: Lima Region, Yauyos Province
- Coordinates: 12°38′57″S 75°42′59″W
- Basin countries: Peru

Challwaqucha (Quechua challwa 'fish', qucha 'lake', "fish lake", hispanicized spelling Chalhuacocha) is a lake in Peru located in the Lima Region, Yauyos Province, on the border of the districts of Colonia and Tupe. It lies southeast of the mountain and the lake named Wankarqucha. The Challwamayu ("fish river", Chaullamayo) originates south of the lake. Its waters flow to the Cañete River.
