= Artisa Ukru =

Mountain in Peru

- Location within Peru

Highest point
- Elevation: 4,400 m (14,400 ft)
- Coordinates: 9°34′46″S 76°55′20″W

Geography
- Location: Peru, Huánuco Region
- Parent range: Andes

Artisa Ukru (Quechua artisa wooden boat, ukru hole, pit, hollow, "boat pit", also spelled Artezaucro) is a mountain in the Andes of Peru which reaches a height of approximately 4,400 m (14,436 ft). It is located in the Huánuco Region, Huamalíes Province, Llata District.
