= Jircan District =

Coordinates: 9.2455°S 76.7186°W

Jircan Hirkan
- District
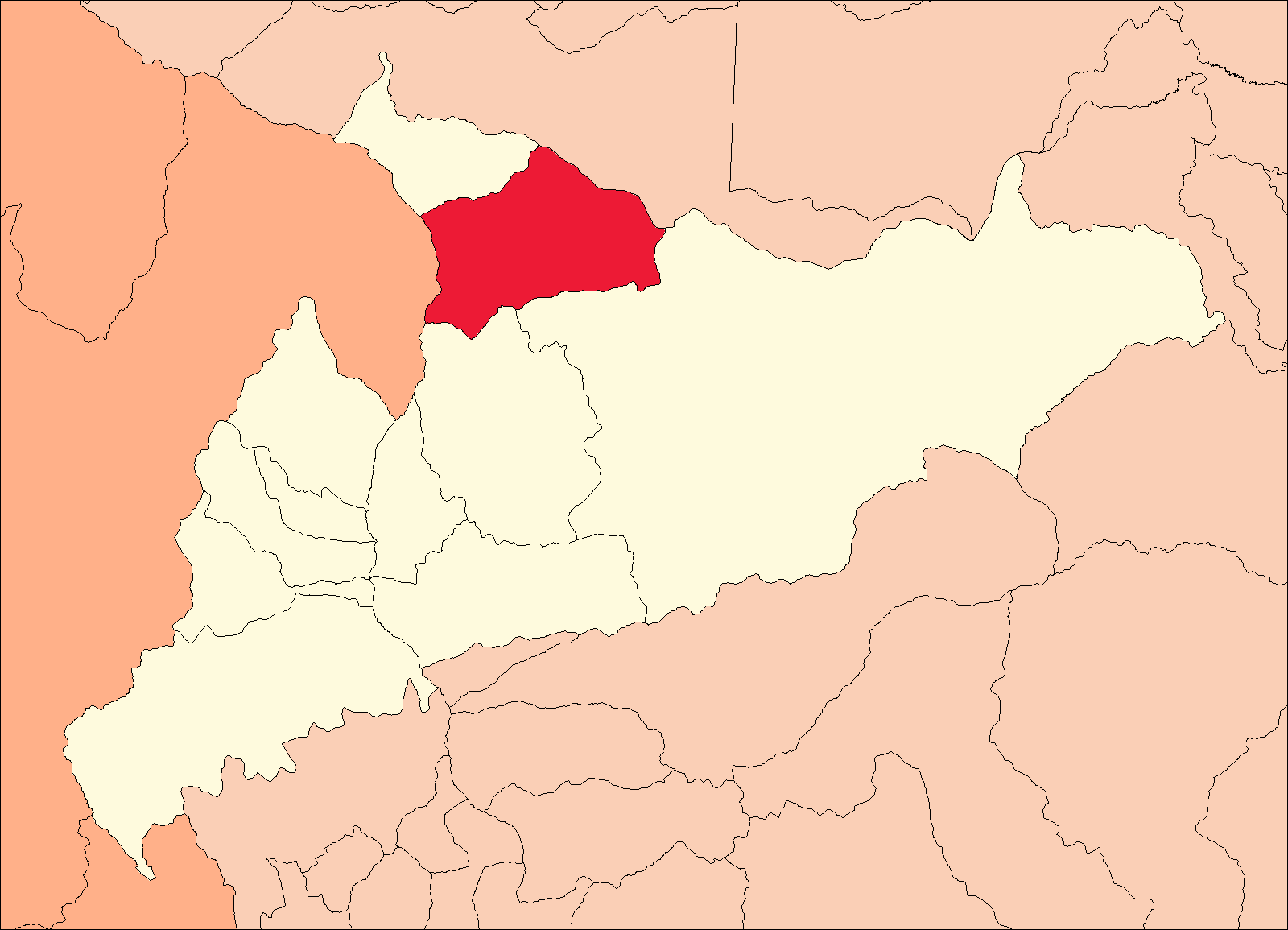
- Location of Jircan in the Huamalíes Province
- Country: Peru
- Region: Huánuco
- Province: Huamalíes
- Founded: October 7, 1942
- Capital: Jircan

Government
  - Mayor: Juan Villanueva Lopez

Area
  - Total: 84.81 km^{2} (32.75 sq mi)
- Elevation: 3,202 m (10,505 ft)

Population (2005 census)
  - Total: 3,382
  - Density: 39.88/km^{2} (103.3/sq mi)
- Time zone: UTC-5 (PET)
- UBIGEO: 100505

Jircan or Hirkan (Quechua) is one of eleven districts of the province Huamalíes in Peru.

== See also ==
- Awqa Punta
- Miyu Pampa
- Urpish
