= Huankarán =

Archaeological site in Peru

- Interactive map of Huankarán
- Location: Peru, Huánuco Region, Huamalíes Province
- Region: Andes

Huankarán (possibly from Quechua wanqara a kind of drum) is an archaeological site with a rectangular tower, a couple of buildings and stone tombs (chullpa) in Peru. It is situated in the Huánuco Region, Huamalíes Province, Tantamayo District.

== See also ==
- Anku
- Isog
- Piruro
- Susupillo
