= Chavín de Pariarca District =

Coordinates: 9.4258°S 76.7664°W

Chavín de Pariarca
- District
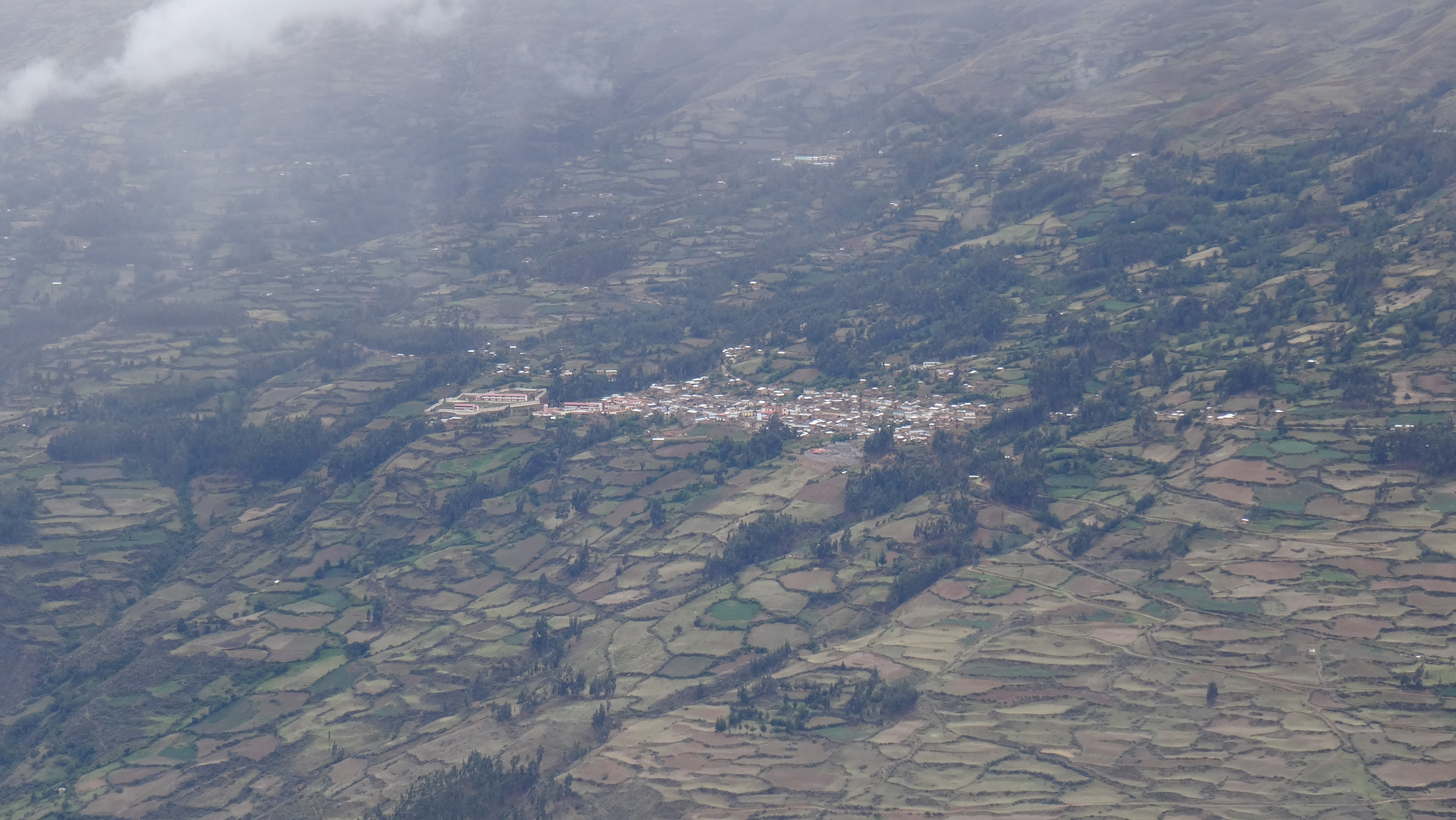
- Chavín de Pariarca
- Interactive map of Chavín de Pariarca
- Country: Peru
- Region: Huánuco
- Province: Huamalíes
- Capital: Chavín de Pariarca

Government
  - Mayor: Melanio Bocanegra Jaramillo

Area
  - Total: 89.25 km^{2} (34.46 sq mi)
- Elevation: 3,362 m (11,030 ft)

Population (2005 census)
  - Total: 4,862
  - Density: 54.48/km^{2} (141.1/sq mi)
- Time zone: UTC-5 (PET)
- UBIGEO: 100503

Chavín de Pariarca District is one of eleven districts of the province Huamalíes in Peru.

== Ethnic groups ==
The people in the district are mainly indigenous citizens of Quechua descent. Quechua is the language which the majority of the population (55.25%) learnt to speak in childhood, 43.63% of the residents started speaking using the Spanish language (2007 Peru Census).

== See also ==
- Wiqruqucha
