= Colonia District =

Coordinates: 12.6336°S 75.8903°W

Colonia
- District
- Interactive map of Colonia
- Country: Peru
- Region: Lima
- Province: Yauyos
- Founded: July 15, 1936
- Capital: Colonia

Government
  - Mayor: Hernan Justo Damian Cotache

Area
  - Total: 323.96 km^{2} (125.08 sq mi)
- Elevation: 3,388 m (11,115 ft)

Population (2005 census)
  - Total: 1,564
  - Density: 4.828/km^{2} (12.50/sq mi)
- Time zone: UTC-5 (PET)
- UBIGEO: 151011

Colonia District is one of thirty-three districts of the province Yauyos in Peru.

== See also ==
- Challwaqucha
- Upyanqa
- Wankarqucha
