= Miraflores District =

Miraflores District may refer to several districts in Peru:

- Miraflores District, Arequipa
- Miraflores District, Huamalíes
- Miraflores District, Lima
- Miraflores District, Yauyos
