= Puños District =

Coordinates: 9.4996°S 76.8850°W

Puños
- District
- Interactive map of Puños
- Country: Peru
- Region: Huánuco
- Province: Huamalíes
- Founded: October 7, 1942
- Capital: Puños

Government
  - Mayor: Casimiro Rosales Caqui

Area
  - Total: 101.75 km^{2} (39.29 sq mi)
- Elevation: 3,739 m (12,267 ft)

Population (2005 census)
  - Total: 5,025
  - Density: 49.39/km^{2} (127.9/sq mi)
- Time zone: UTC-5 (PET)
- UBIGEO: 100509

Puños District is one of eleven districts of the province Huamalíes in Peru.

== Ethnic groups ==
The people in the district are mainly indigenous citizens of Quechua descent. Quechua is the language which the majority of the population (95.12%) learnt to speak in childhood, 4.74% of the residents started speaking using the Spanish language (2007 Peru Census).

== See also ==
- Putka
