= Quillcay Machay =

Archaeological site in Peru

- Location within Peru
- 9.401318°S 76.826588°W
- Location: Peru
- Region: Huánuco Region, Huamalíes Province

Quillcay Machay or Qillqay Mach'ay (Quechua qillqay to write, mach'ay cave, Hispanicized spelling Quillcay Machay) is an archaeological site in Peru. It is situated in the Huánuco Region, Huamalíes Province, Singa District. The site is known for its rock paintings. It was declared a National Cultural Heritage of Peru by Resolución Directoral No. 533/INC on June 18, 2002.

== See also ==
- Ahuila Gencha Machay
- Pumaj Jirca
- Huata
