= Qanchis Kancha =

Mountain in Peru

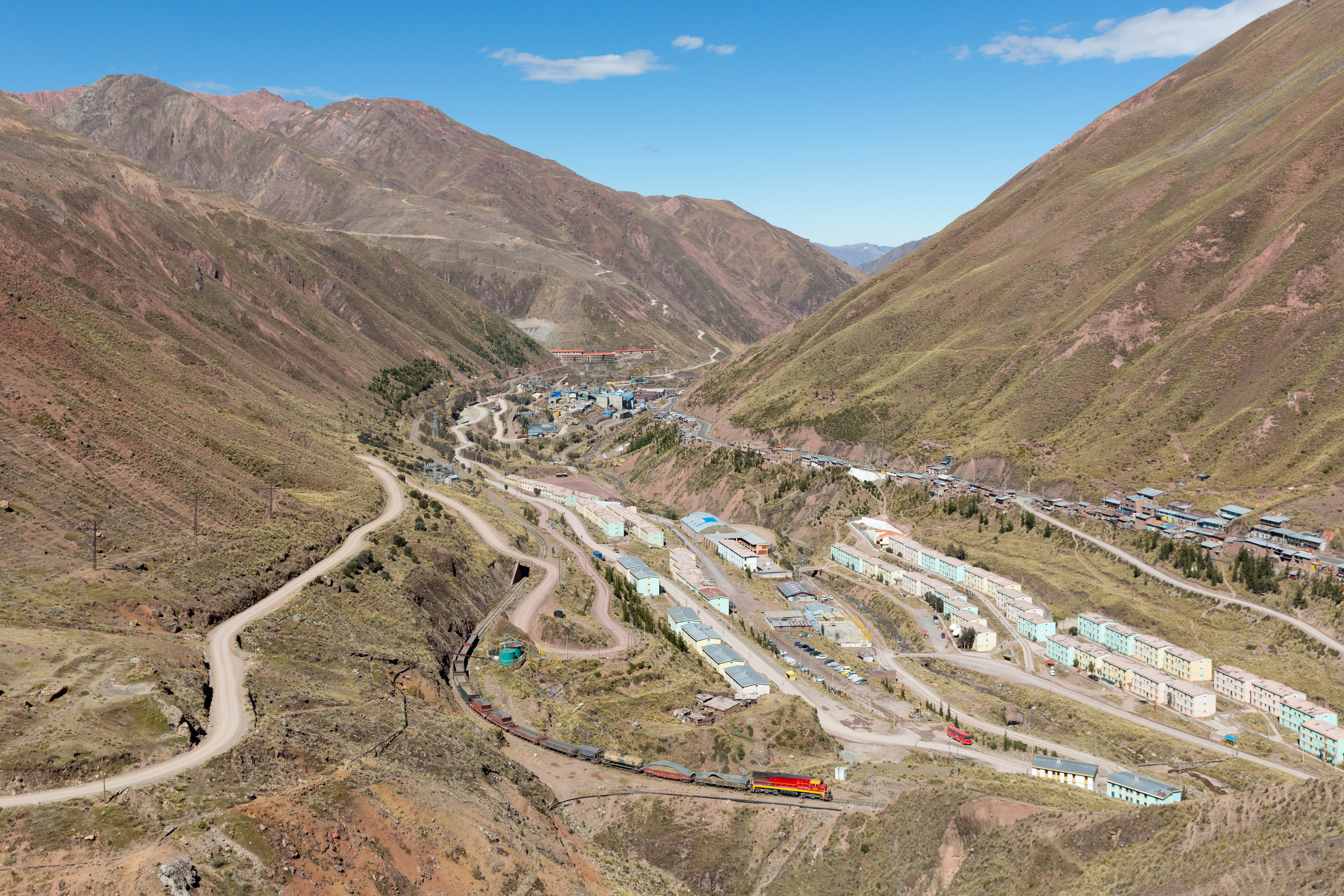
- The mining village of Q'asa P'allqa (Casapalca) and the eastern slope of Qanchis Kancha (on the right) as seen from Jirish Mach'ay, looking to the south.

Highest point
- Elevation: 5,000 m (16,000 ft)
- Coordinates: 11°37′55″S 76°14′49″W

Geography
- Location within Peru
- Location: Peru, Lima Region
- Parent range: Andes

Qanchis Kancha (Quechua qanchis seven, kancha corral, "seven corrals", Hispanicized spelling Janchiscancha) is a mountain in the Andes of Peru, about 5,000 metres (16,404 ft) high. It is situated in the Lima Region, Huarochiri Province, Chicla District. Qanchis Kancha lies near the Antikuna mountain pass, southwest of Tikti Mach'ay and Jirish Mach'ay.
