= Lake Sacracocha =

Lake in the Department of Huánuco, Peru

- Location within Peru
- Location: Peru; Huánuco Region, Huamalíes Province, Llata District
- Coordinates: 9°36′38″S 76°58′25″W

Lake Sacracocha (possibly from Quechua saqra malignant, bad, wicked; qucha lake) is a lake in the Andes of Peru located in the Huánuco Region, Huamalíes Province, Llata District. It is situated northeast of Lake Carhuacocha and northwest of Lake Yanaqucha.
