= Miraflores, La Paz =

Neighborhood of La Paz, Bolivia

Coordinates: 16.4994°S 68.1228°W

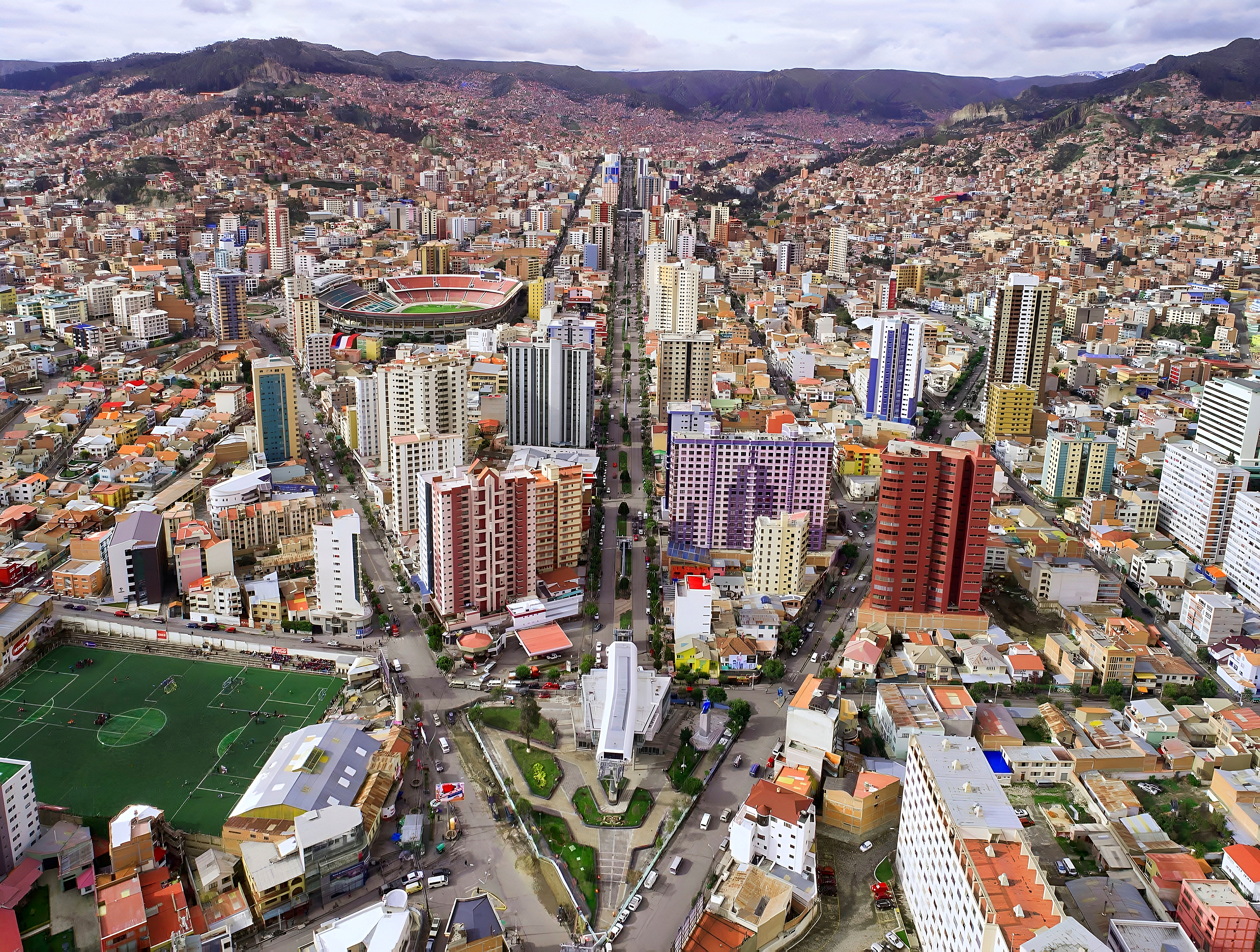
View of Miraflores

Miraflores is a neighborhood of La Paz, the capital city of Bolivia. It is located in the east of the city center. Miraflores has as its main attractions the Botanical Garden, Busch Avenue, Villarroel Square to the north, the Hernando Siles Stadium next to the Archaeological Plaza, among others. Miraflores is a residential neighborhood and is completely urbanized.

The area was subject to extensive redevelopment, starting in the 1950s.

The Miraflores Women's Penitentiary Center is located there.
