= Millpu (Huánuco) =

Mountain in Peru

- Location within Peru

Highest point
- Elevation: 4,400 m (14,400 ft)
- Coordinates: 9°18′32″S 76°50′15″W

Geography
- Location: Peru, Huánuco Region
- Parent range: Andes

Millpu (Quechua for "throat, gullet", also spelled Millpo) is a mountain in the Andes of Peru which reaches a height of approximately 4,400 m (14,436 ft). It is located in the Huánuco Region, Huamalíes Province, Singa District.
