= Susupillo =

Archaeological site in Peru

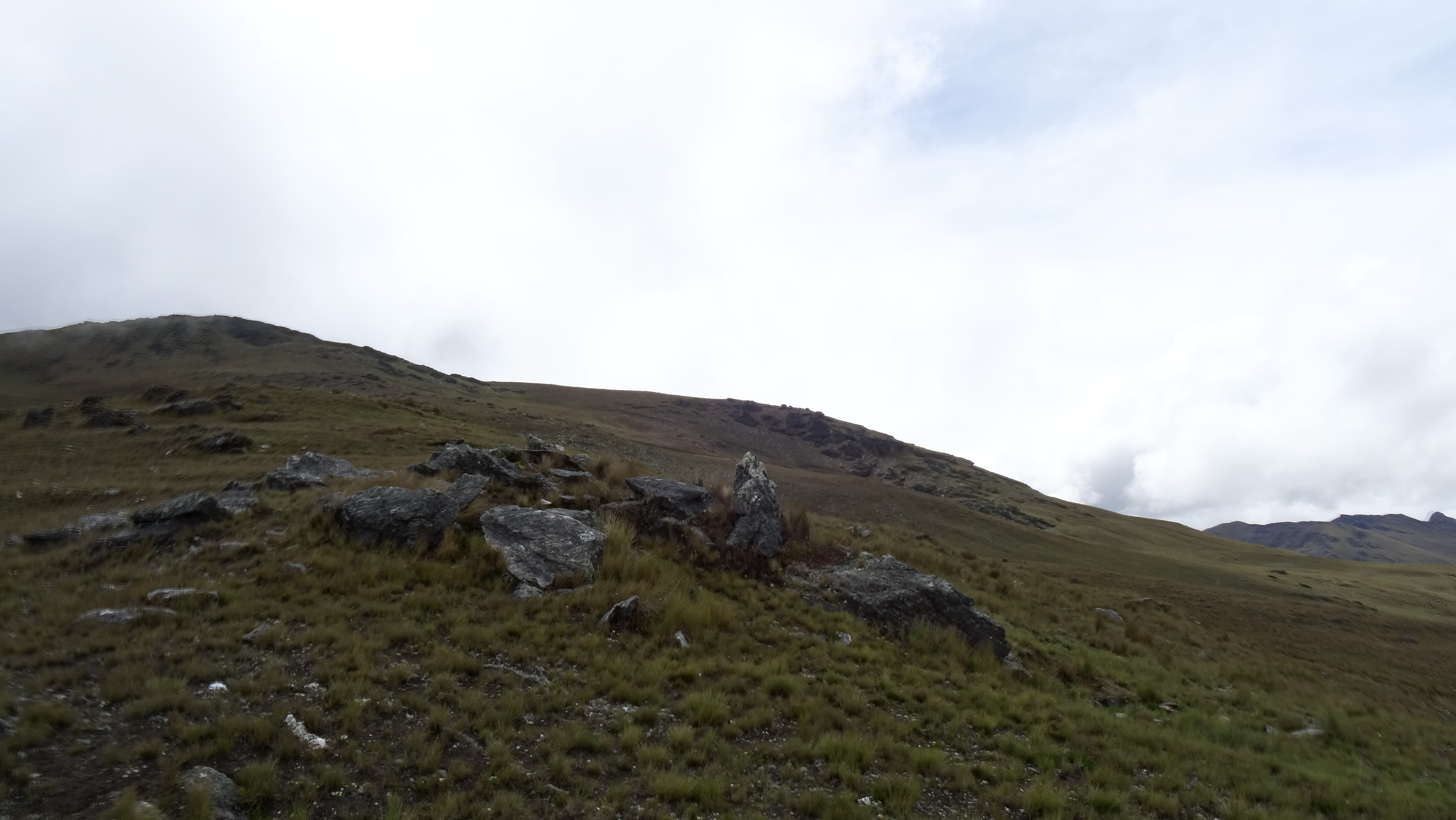

Highest point
- Elevation: 4,400 m (14,400 ft)
- Coordinates: 9°24′00″S 76°41′04″W

Geography
- Location within Peru
- Location: Peru, Huánuco Region, Huamalíes Province

Susupillo is a mountain with an archaeological site of the same name in the Andes of Peru, about 4,400 metres (14,436 ft) high. It is situated in the Huánuco Region, Huamalíes Province, Tantamayo District.

The archaeological site of Susupillo lies on the northern slope of the mountain at about 9°23′32.4″S 76°41′33.5″W, at a height of more than 3,800 metres (12,467 ft). It was declared a National Cultural Heritage of Peru by Resolución Directoral No. 533/INC on June 18, 2002.

== See also ==
- Anku
- Isog
- Piruro
- Huankarán
