= Huamalíes province =

Coordinates: 9.549620°S 76.816921°W

Huamalíes
- Province
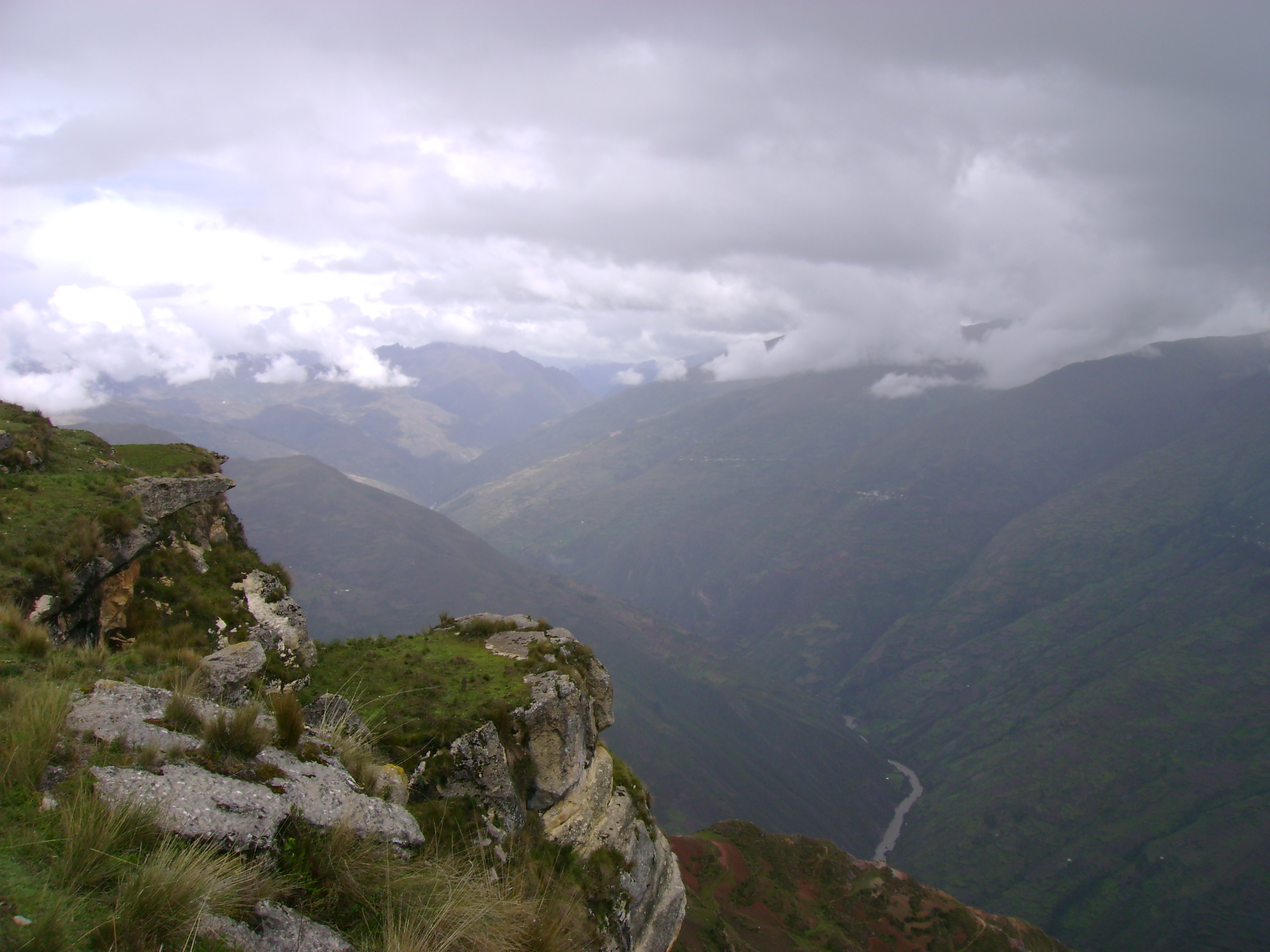
- The upper Marañón River in the Huamalíes Province

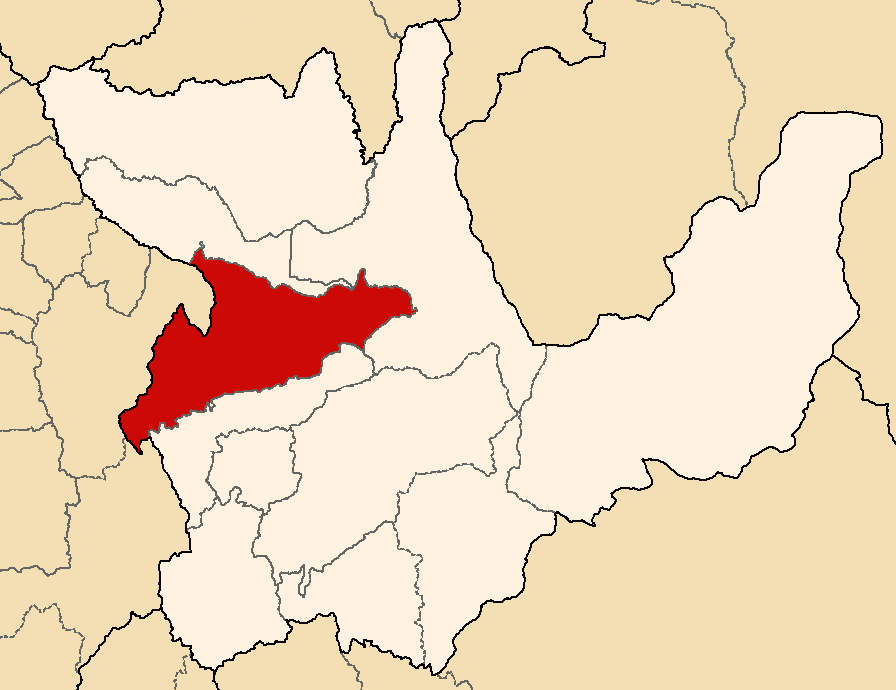
- Location of Huamalíes in the Huánuco Region
- Country: Peru
- Region: Huánuco
- Capital: Llata

Government
  - Mayor: Eduardo Grover Quino Herrera

Area
  - Total: 3,144.50 km^{2} (1,214.10 sq mi)

Population (2005 census)
  - Total: 68,809
  - Density: 21.882/km^{2} (56.675/sq mi)
- UBIGEO: 1005

Huamalíes is one of eleven provinces of the Huánuco Region in Peru. The capital of this province is the city of Llata.

== Boundaries ==
- North: province of Huacaybamba
- East: province of Leoncio Prado
- South: province of Dos de Mayo
- West: Ancash Region

== Geography ==
Some of the highest mountains of the province are listed below:

- Artisa Ukru
- Kuntur Wank'a
- Mama Hirka
- Marayniyuq
- Millpu
- Millwa Pillu
- Pawqar
- Puma Wayin
- Putka
- P'itiq Punta
- Qaqa Mach'ay
- Qucha Qaqa
- Susupillu
- Tinyaq
- Tumaq Hirka
- Ushnu
- Ushnu Rumi
- Wamash Punta
- Warmi Wañusqa
- Wirush

== Political division ==
The province is divided into eleven districts, which are:

- Arancay (Arancay)
- Chavín de Pariarca (Chavín de Pariarca)
- Jacas Grande (Jacas Grande)
- Jircan (Jircan)
- Llata (Llata)
- Miraflores (Miraflores)
- Monzón (Monzón)
- Punchao (Punchao)
- Puños (Puños)
- Singa (Singa)
- Tantamayo (Tantamayo)

== Ethnic groups ==
The people in the province are mainly indigenous citizens of Quechua descent. Quechua is the language which the majority of the population (53.30%) learnt to speak in childhood, 46.23% of the residents started speaking using the Spanish language (2007 Peru Census).

== Archaeology ==
Some of the most important archaeological sites of the province are Anku, Awila Qhincha Mach'ay, Awkin Punta, Awqa Punta, Isuq, K'ipakhara, Miyu Pampa, Phiruru, Pumaq Hirka, Qillqay Mach'ay, Susupillu, Urpish, Wanqaran and Wat'a, some of which were declared a National Cultural Heritage.

== See also ==
- Kinwaqucha
- Qarwaqucha
- Wiqruqucha
- Yanaqucha
