= Putka (Huánuco) =

Mountain in Peru

- Location within Peru

Highest point
- Elevation: 4,400 m (14,400 ft)
- Coordinates: 9°30′32″S 76°55′36″W

Geography
- Location: Peru, Huánuco Region
- Parent range: Andes

Putka (Jauja Quechua for "muddy", also spelled Potga) is a mountain in the Andes of Peru which reaches a height of approximately 4,400 m (14,436 ft). It is located in the Huánuco Region, Huamalíes Province, Puños District.
