= Miyu Pampa =

Archaeological site in Peru

- Interactive map of Miyu Pampa
- 9°23′59.2″S 76°49′34.2″W
- Location: Peru, Huánuco Region, Huamalíes Province

Site notes
- Height: 3,434 metres (11,266 ft)

Miyu Pampa or Miyupampa (Quechua miyu poison, pampa a large plain, "poison plain", Hispanicized spellings Miopampa, Miu Pampa) is an archaeological site in Peru. It lies in the Huánuco Region, Huamalíes Province, Jircan District. It is situated at a height of about 3,434 metres (11,266 ft) about 500 m northeast of Jircan.

== See also ==
- Awqa Punta
- Urpish
