= Putka (Lima) =

Mountain in Peru

- Location within Peru

Highest point
- Elevation: 5,100 m (16,700 ft)
- Coordinates: 11°41′10″S 76°12′50″W

Geography
- Location: Peru, Lima Region
- Parent range: Andes, Cordillera Central

Putka (Jauja Quechua for "muddy", also spelled Putca) is a mountain in the Cordillera Central in the Andes of Peru, about 5,100 metres (16,732 ft) high. It is slocated in the Lima Region, Huarochirí Province, Chicla District.

Putka lies northwest of Wayrakancha and east of Quñuqp'ukru and the little lake named Putkaqucha (Quechua for "muddy lake", Hispanicized name Lago Putca or Laguna Putca) which is located at 11°41′20″S 76°13′37″W.
