= Tiktiqucha =

Lake in Peru

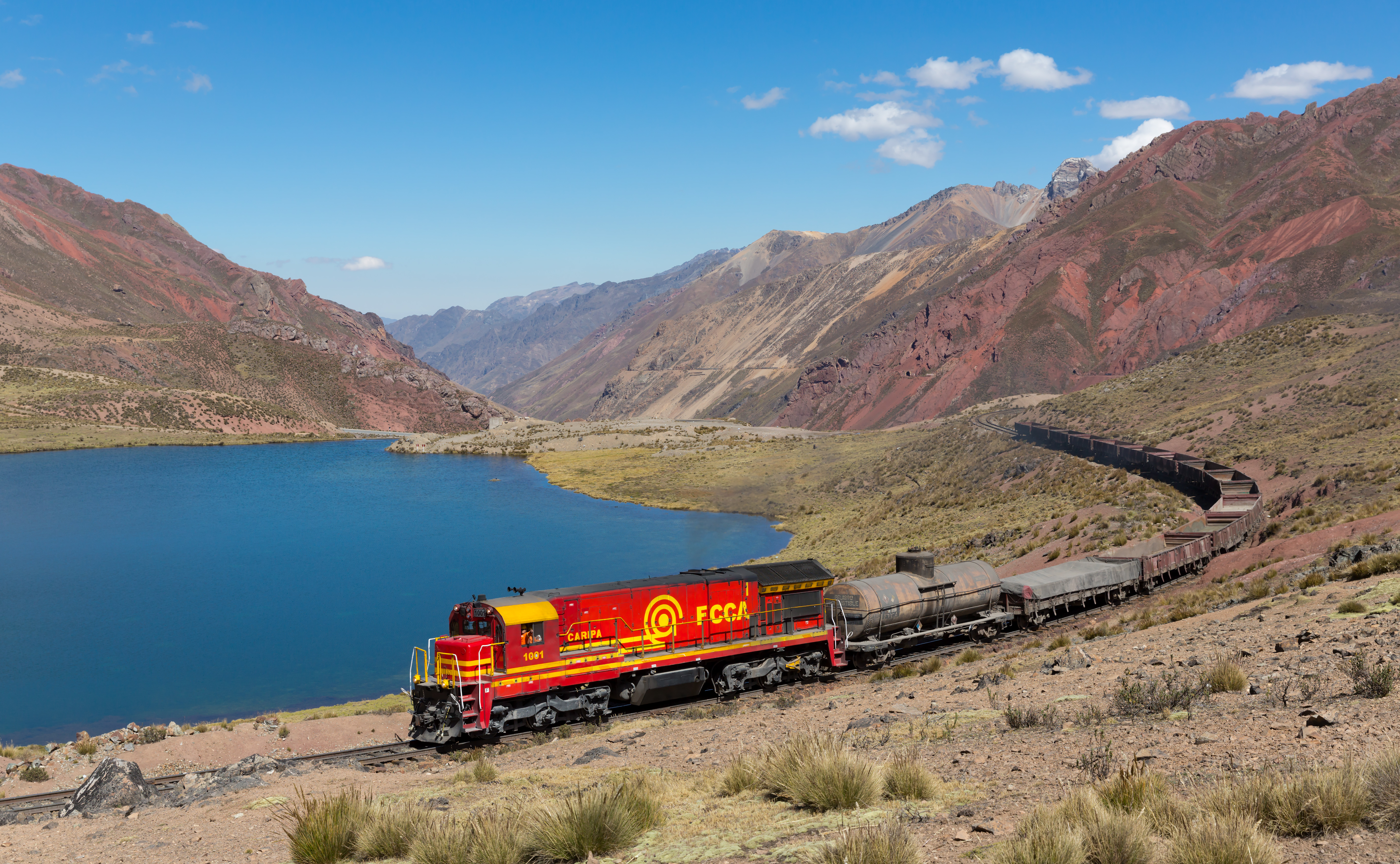
- The train from Lima to La Oroya at the lake Tiktiqucha, just before reaching the Antikuna pass

- Location within Peru
- Location: Lima Region
- Coordinates: 11°36′24″S 76°12′2″W
- Basin countries: Peru

Tiktiqucha (Quechua tikti wart, qucha lake, lagoon, "wart lake", hispanicized spelling Ticticocha) is a lake in Peru located in the Lima Region, Huarochirí Province, Chicla District. Tiktiqucha lies near the Antikuna mountain pass, southwest of a lake named Waqraqucha and southeast of the peak of Tikti Mach'ay.

== See also ==
- Nor Yauyos-Cochas Landscape Reserve
- List of lakes in Peru
