= Wiqruqucha (Huamalíes) =

Lake in the Huamalíes Province, Huánuco Region, Peru

- Location within Peru
- Location: Peru; Huánuco Region
- Coordinates: 9°26′46″S 76°43′08″W

Wiqruqucha (Quechua wiqru twisted, bent, qucha lake, "bent lake", hispanicized spelling Huegro Cocha) is a lake in Peru located in the Huánuco Region, Huamalíes Province, Chavín de Pariarca District, near the village Wiqru (Huegro). Its waters flow to a stream named Qallu (Quechua for tongue, hispanicized Gallo, Callo) and then to Marañón River.
