= Tantamayo District =

Coordinates: 9.3927°S 76.7195°W

Tantamayo Tanta Mayu
- District
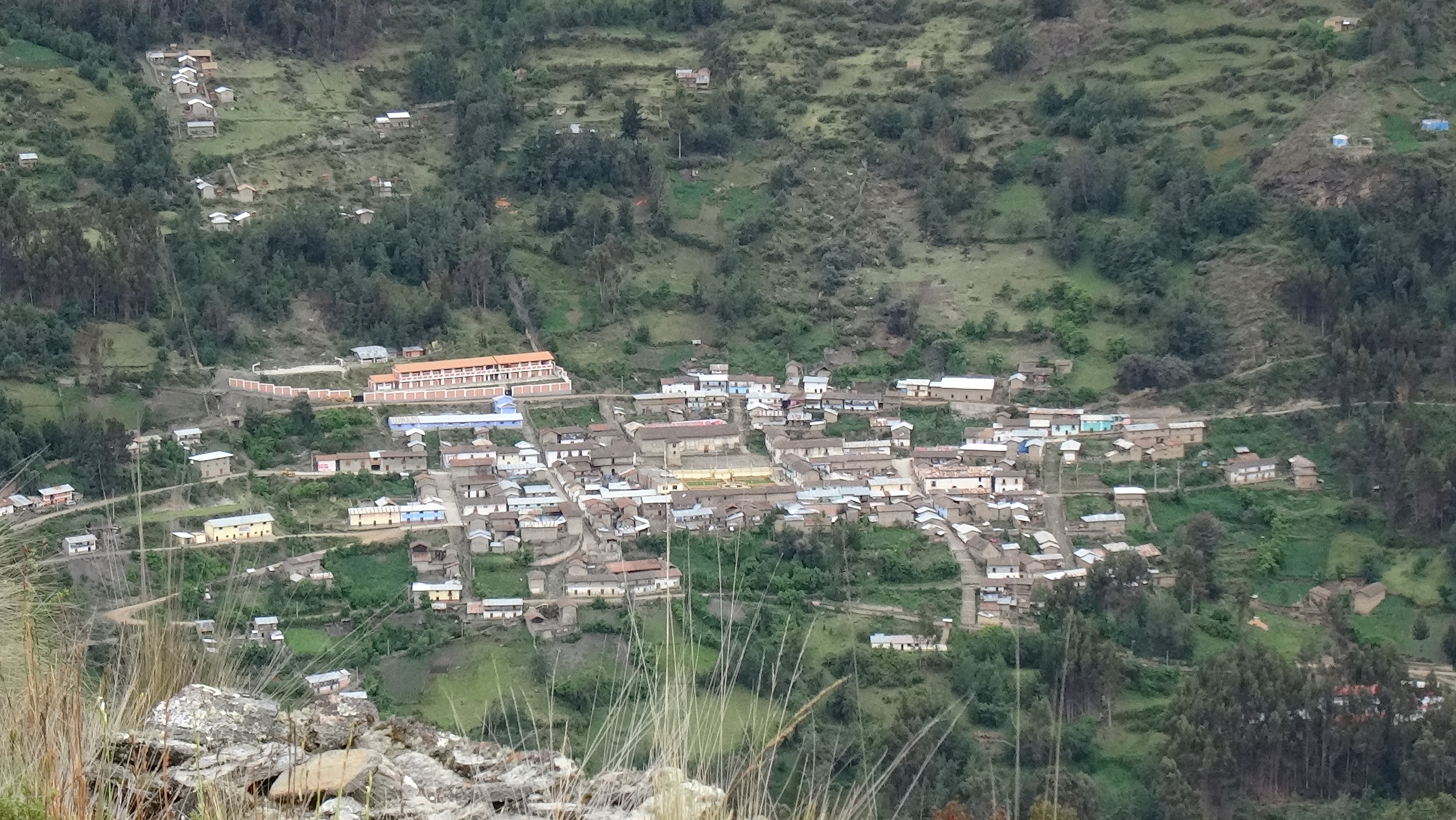
- Tantamayo as seen from the archaeological sites of Phiruru
- Interactive map of Tantamayo
- Country: Peru
- Region: Huánuco
- Province: Huamalíes
- Founded: October 29, 1923
- Capital: Tantamayo

Government
  - Mayor: Sofonias Heriberto Gutierrez Antonio

Area
  - Total: 249.95 km^{2} (96.51 sq mi)
- Elevation: 3,495 m (11,467 ft)

Population (2005 census)
  - Total: 2,780
  - Density: 11.1/km^{2} (28.8/sq mi)
- Time zone: UTC-5 (PET)
- UBIGEO: 100511

Tantamayo (from Quechua Tanta Mayu) is one of eleven districts of the Huamalíes Province in Peru.

== Geography ==
One of the highest peaks of the district is Hatun Kancha at approximately 4,400 m (14,400 ft). Other mountains are listed below:

- Chawpi Hirka
- Kiswar
- Maman Punta
- Pinqullu
- Susupillu
- Wak'a Rumi Punta
- Wiñaq

== Ethnic groups ==
The people in the district are mainly indigenous citizens of Quechua descent. Quechua is the language which the majority of the population (72.93%) learnt to speak in childhood, 26.47% of the residents started speaking using the Spanish language (2007 Peru Census).

== Archaeology ==
Some of the most important archaeological sites of the district are Anku, Isuq, Phiruru, Susupillu and Wanqaran.
