= Miraflores District, Huamalíes =

Coordinates: 9.4945°S 76.8196°W

Miraflores District
- District
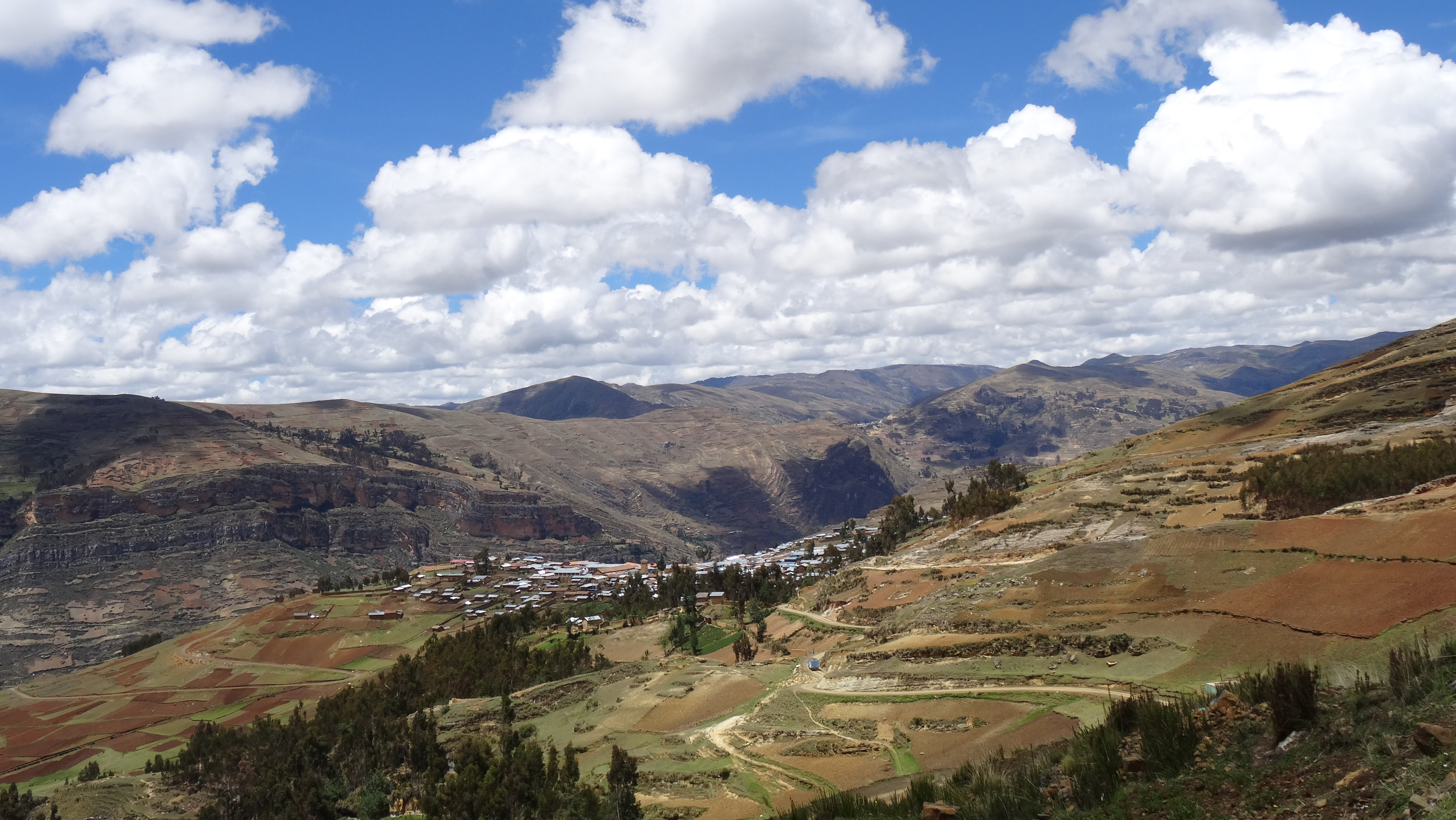
- Miraflores
- Interactive map of Miraflores District
- Country: Peru
- Region: Huánuco
- Province: Wamali
- Founded: July 15, 1936
- Capital: Sisapampa

Government
  - Mayor: Filomon Castro Evangelista

Area
  - Total: 96.74 km^{2} (37.35 sq mi)
- Elevation: 3,667 m (12,031 ft)

Population (2005 census)
  - Total: 3,727
  - Density: 38.53/km^{2} (99.78/sq mi)
- Time zone: UTC-5 (PET)
- UBIGEO: 100506

Sisapampa District is one of eleven districts of the province Wamali in Peru.

== Ethnic groups ==
The people in the district are mainly indigenous citizens of Quechua descent. Quechua is the language which the majority of the population (83.81%) learnt to speak in childhood, 15.94% of the residents started speaking using the Spanish language (2007 Peru Census).

== See also ==
- Pumaq Hirka
