= Estadio Edgar Peña Gutierrez =

Football stadium in Santa Cruz de la Sierra, Bolivia

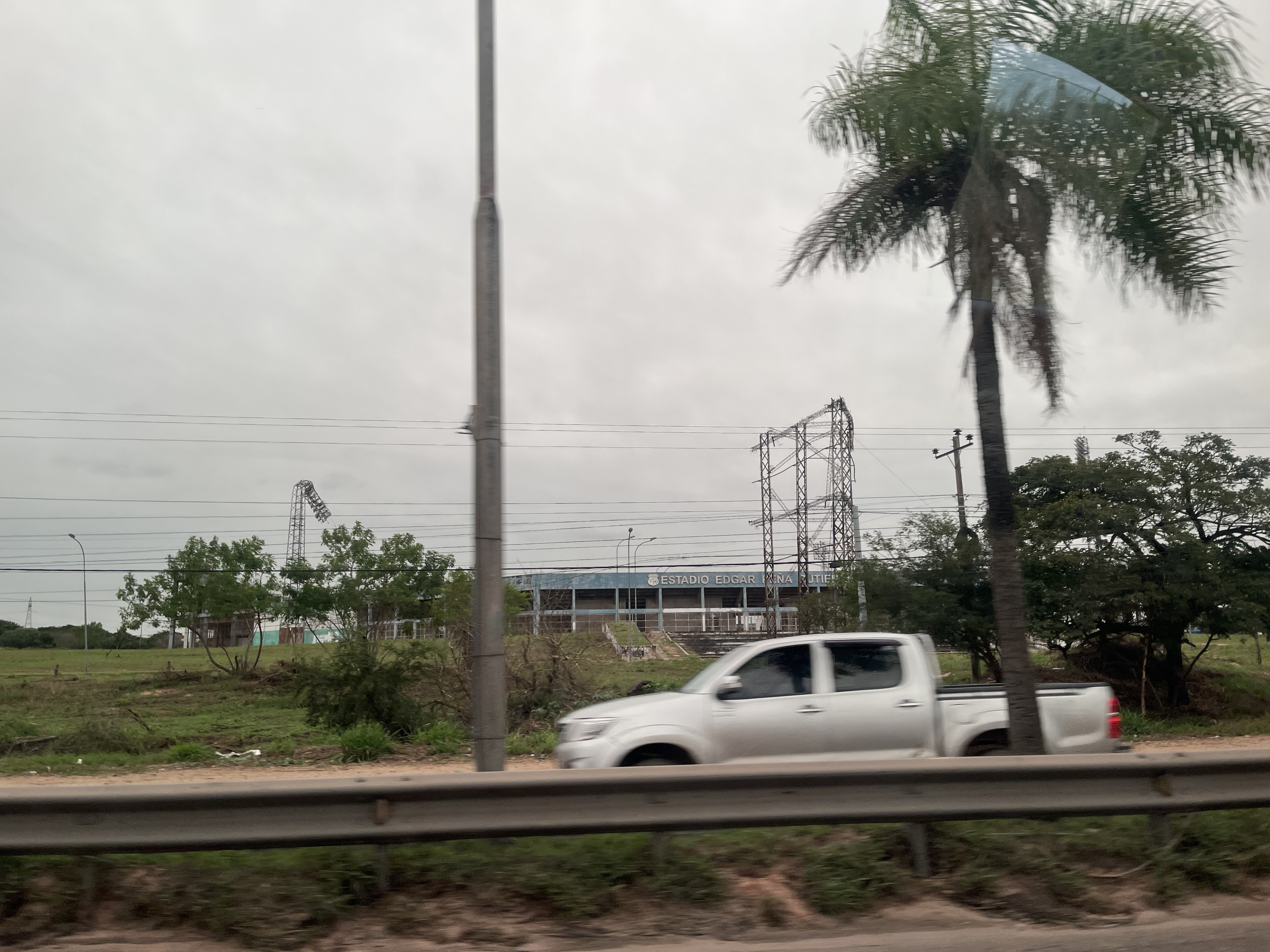
- Interactive map of Estadio Edgar Peña Gutierrez
- Location: Santa Cruz de la Sierra, Bolivia
- Coordinates: 17.67°S 63.16°W
- Capacity: 17,000

The Estadio Edgar Peña Gutierrez is a football stadium in Santa Cruz de la Sierra, Bolivia. It opened on 30 October 2015. The stadium has a capacity of 17,000.
