= Miraflores, California =

Unincorporated community in Orange County, California, US

Coordinates: 33°48′15″N 117°54′28″W

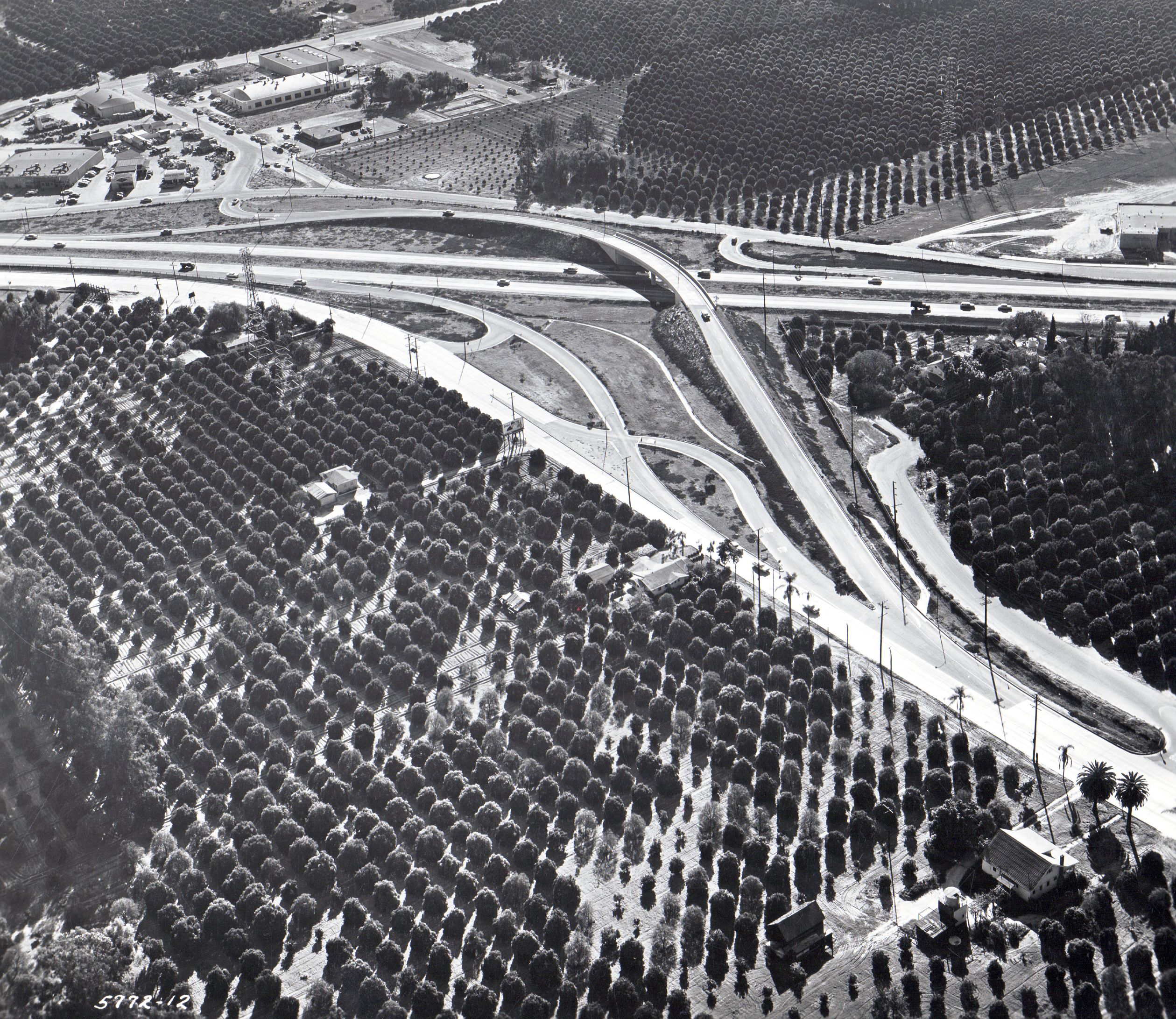
1957 aerial photograph of Interstate 5 at Miraflores. Nothing except I-5 remains from this, the entire area is unrecognizable today.

Miraflores is a former unincorporated community now part of the city of Anaheim in Orange County, in the U.S. state of California. Miraflores is 150 feet above sea level.

== History ==
Miraflores is a name derived from Spanish meaning "behold the flowers". The town formerly had a post office and currently has a major junction of the Atchison, Topeka and Santa Fe railway. The area is mostly commercial, with many industrial warehouses along the railway. The Anaheim Regional Transportation Intermodal Center, Angel Stadium, and the Honda Center are nearby to the east, while Disneyland and the surrounding Resorts District is nearby to the west.
