= Ahuila Gencha Machay =

Archaeological site in Peru

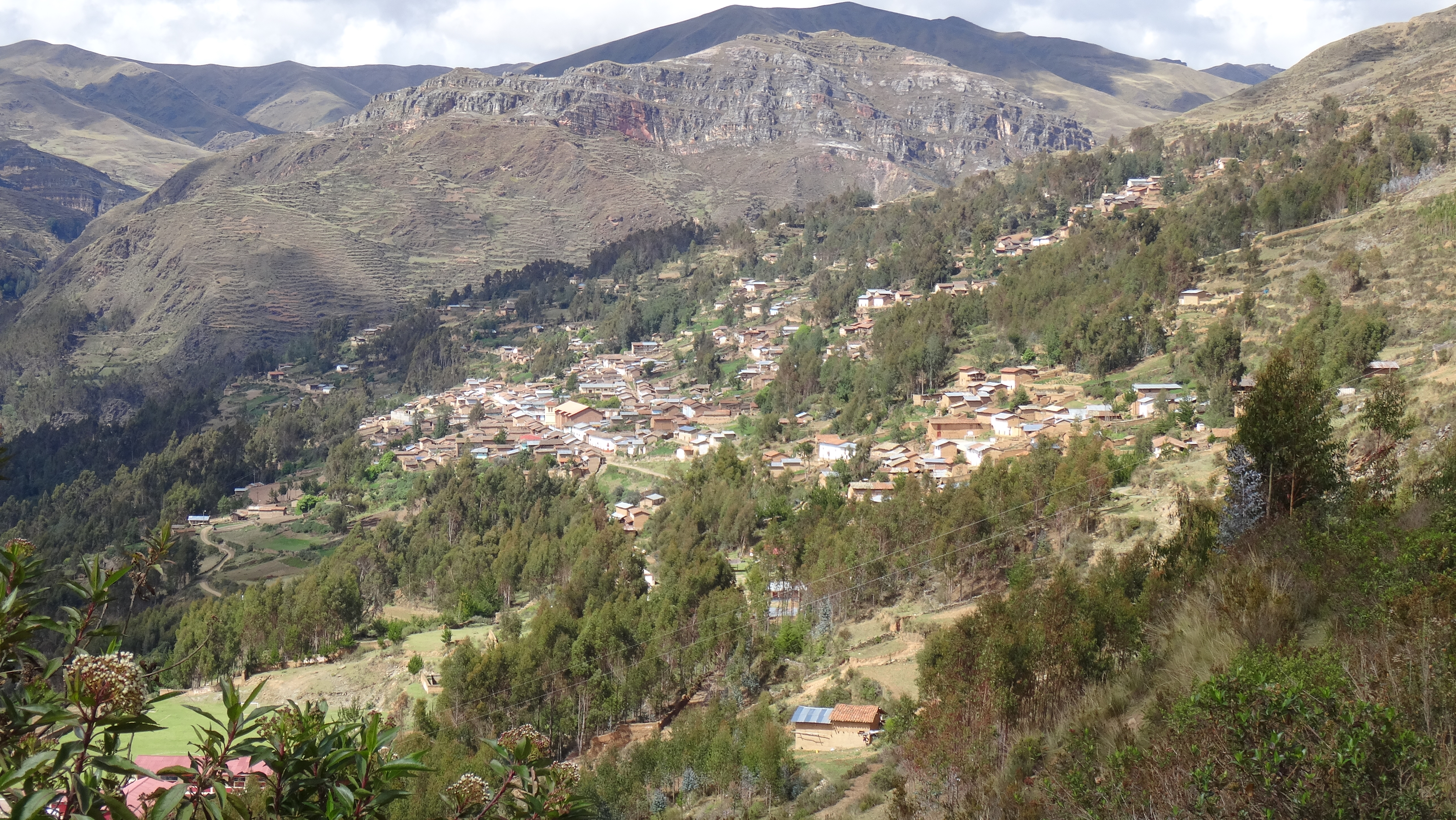
- The village of Singa with the mountain Ocpay in the background where the archaeological site of Ahuila Gencha Machay is situated

- Location within Peru
- 9°23′59.2″S 76°49′34.2″W
- Location: Peru, Huánuco Region, Huamalíes Province

Ahuila Gencha Machay (possibly from Quechua awila grandmother a borrowing from Spanish abuela, qhincha bad luck, unlucky person, unlucky, qincha hedge, fence, mach'ay cave) is an archaeological site with cave paintings in Peru. It lies in the Huánuco Region, Huamalíes Province, Singa District. It is situated on the mountain Ocpay southwest of Singa, at a height of about 3,853 metres (12,641 ft).

== See also ==
- Quillcay Machay
