= Yanaqucha (Huamalíes) =

Lake in Huanuco, Peru

- Location within Peru
- Location: Peru; Huánuco Region, Huamalíes Province, Llata District
- Coordinates: 9°37′16″S 76°56′18″W

Yanaqucha (Quechua yana black, very dark, qucha lake, "black lake", Hispanicized spelling Yanacocha) is a lake in the Andes of Peru located in Llata District, Huamalíes Province, Huánuco Region. It is situated southeast of the lake Saqraqucha, at the foot of the mountain Warmi Wañusqa (Huarmihuañusqa).
