= Jirish Mach'ay =

Mountain in Peru

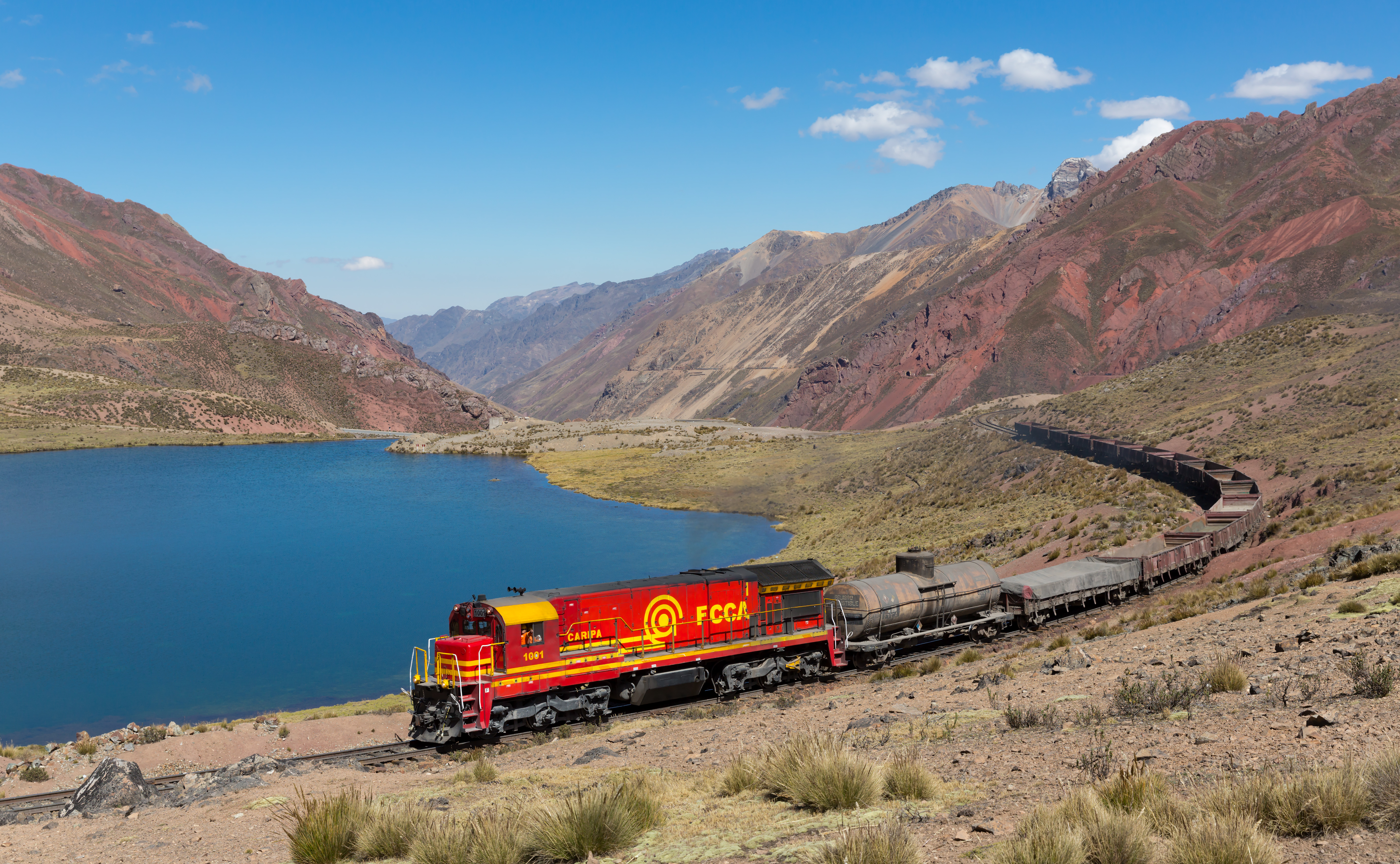
- The train from Lima to La Oroya at the lake Tiktiqucha, just before reaching the Antikuna pass with Jirishmach'ay in the background (from the center to the right)

Highest point
- Elevation: 5,000 m (16,000 ft)
- Coordinates: 11°36′17″S 76°13′1″W

Geography
- Location within Peru
- Location: Peru, Lima Region
- Parent range: Andes

Jirish Mach'ay (local Quechua jirish colibri, mach'ay cave, "colibri cave", also spelled Jirishmachay) is a mountain in the Andes of Peru, about 5,000 metres (16,404 ft) high. It is situated in the Lima Region, Huarochiri Province, Chicla District. Jirish Mach'ay lies near the Antikuna mountain pass, south-west of the mountain Tiktimach'ay and west of the lake Tiktiqucha.

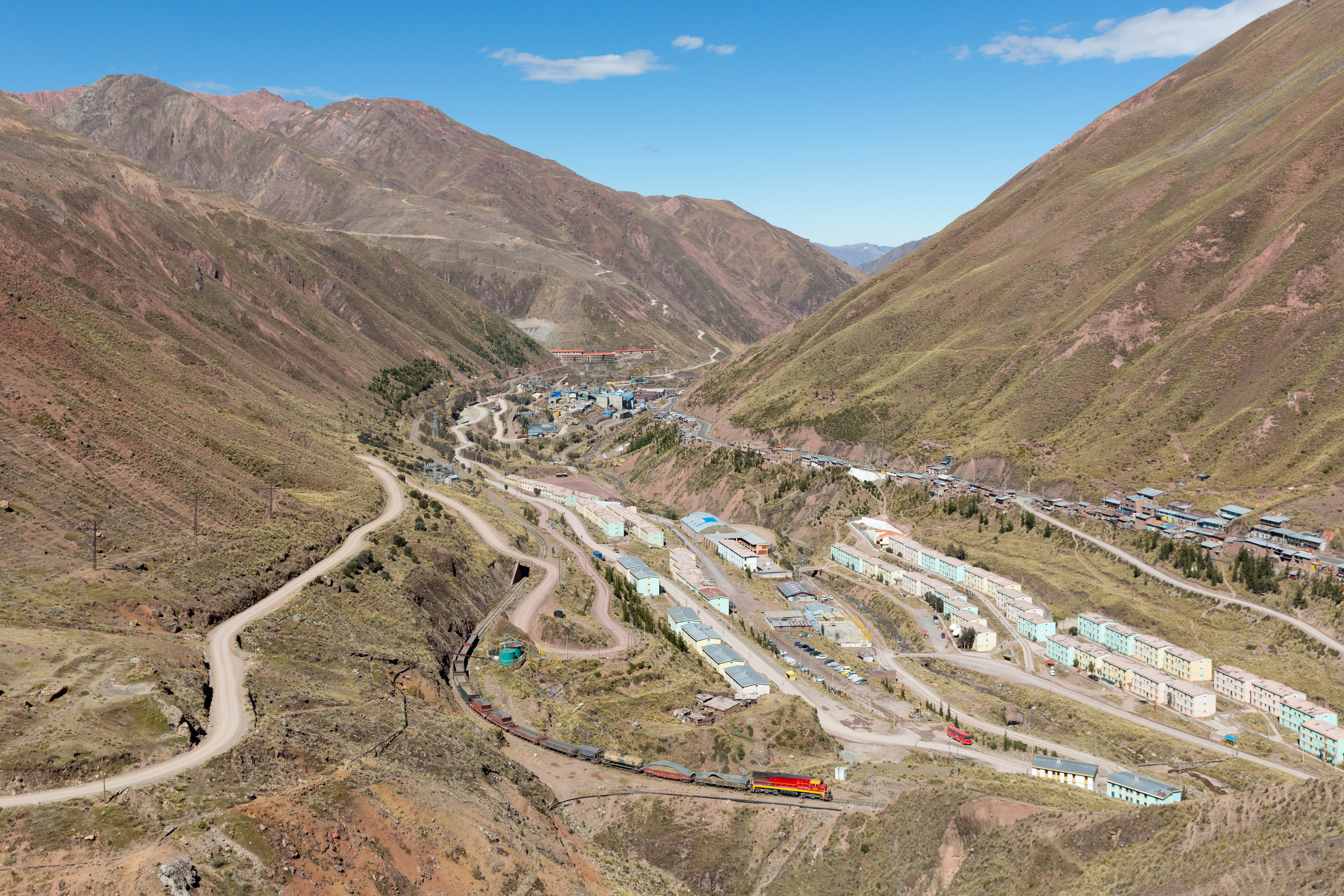
The village of Q'asa P'allqa (Casapalca) as seen from Jirish Mach'ay (looking to the south)
