= Bonaventura =

Bonaventura may refer to:

- Bonaventura (given name), given name
- Bonaventura (surname), surname
- Bonaventura (VTA), light-rail station in San Jose, United States of America
- Signor Bonaventura, an Italian comic strip
- Bonaventura Heinz House (first), in the West End of Davenport, Iowa, United States, listed on the NRHP from 1984 to 2005
- Bonaventura Heinz House (second), historic building located in the West End of Davenport, Iowa, United States, listed on NRHP from 1983
- CVV 8 Bonaventura, Italian two-seat competition glider designed during the 1950s and produced in 50 unities

== See also ==
- Buenaventura (disambiguation)
- Bonaventure (disambiguation)
