= Aníbal Ramón Ruffner =

Peruvian engineer and politician (1959–2022)

Member of the Regional Council of Lima
- In office 1 January 2015 – 31 December 2018
- Preceded by: Julissa Marcelina Rivas Berrocal
- Succeeded by: Amador Seras Reinoso
- Constituency: Canta Province

Mayor of San Buenaventura District
- In office 1 January 2003 – 31 December 2010
- Preceded by: Samuel Ramón Ruffner
- Succeeded by: Eleazar Santiago Zevallos

Personal details
- Born: 20 July 1959; San Buenaventura District, Canta Province, Peru
- Died: 25 September 2022 (aged 63)
- Political party: Concertación para el Desarrollo Regional - Lima
- Education: Inca Garcilaso de la Vega University
- Occupation: Engineer

Aníbal Ramón Ruffner (20 July 1959 – 25 September 2022) was a Peruvian engineer and politician. He served as mayor of San Buenaventura District from 2003 to 2010 and was a member of the Regional Council of Lima from 2015 to 2018.

== Biography ==
He was born in the district of San Buenaventura, province of Canta, Peru, on July 20, 1959. He was the son of Daniel Ramón Alvarado and Aparicia Ruffner Torres. He attended primary and secondary school in Lima, finishing his studies at the Gran Unidad Escolar Ricardo Bentín in the district of Rímac. Between 1977 and 1982 he studied administrative engineering at the Universidad Inca Garcilaso de la Vega.

His first political participation was in the 2002 municipal elections when he was elected mayor of the district of San Buenaventura and reelected in the 2006 municipal elections. He then participated in the 2014 regional elections as a candidate for regional councilor for the Fuerza Regional movement, obtaining the election for the province of Canta.

Ramón died on 25 September 2022, at the age of 63.
