= Bonaventura (given name) =

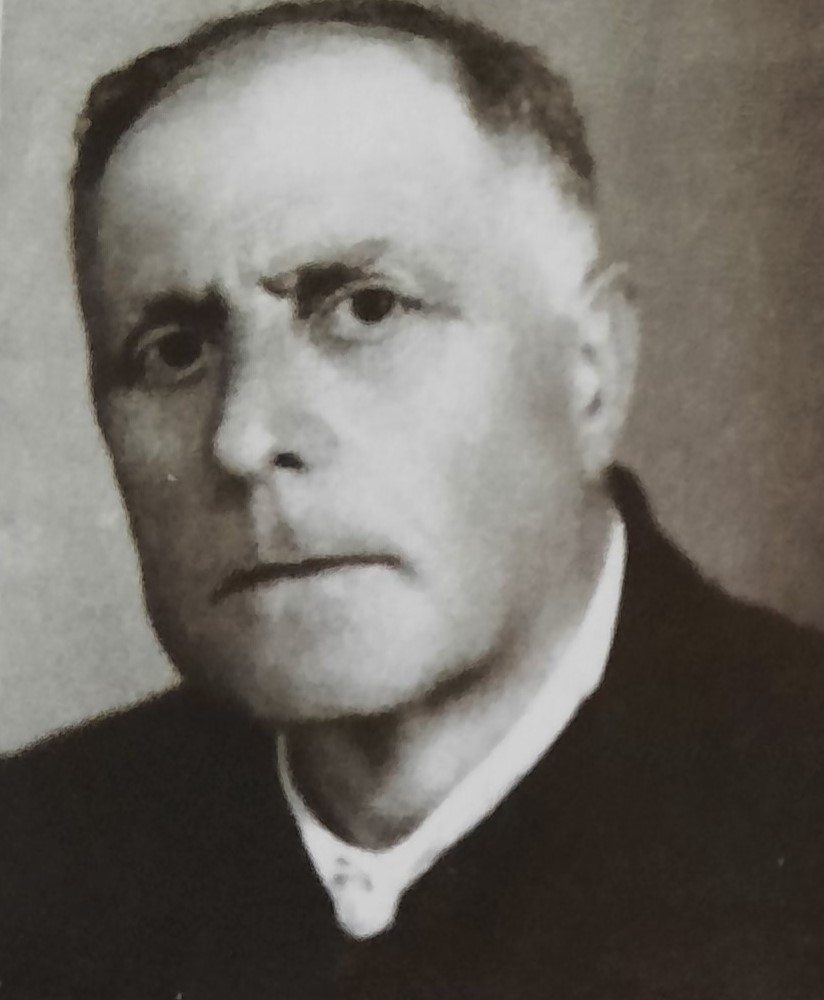
Bonaventura Enriquez

Bonaventura, an Italian name (from Latin Bonaventura, meaning "good fortune") may refer to:

- Bonaventura, Italian and Latin form of the name adopted by the theologian Saint Bonaventure (1221-1274)
- Bonaventura Bellemo O.F.M. (died 1602), Roman Catholic prelate who served as Bishop of Andros
- Bonaventura Berlinghieri (1228–1274), Italian painter of the Gothic period from Lucca, Italy
- Fra Bonaventura Bisi (1601–1659), Italian painter of the Baroque period
- Bonaventura Bottone (born 1950), operatic tenor from England
- Bonaventura Cerronio (fl. 1639), Italian composer
- Bonaventura Claverio (1606–1671), Roman Catholic prelate who served as Bishop of Potenza
- Bonaventura Furlani (died 1597), Roman Catholic prelate who served as Bishop of Alatri
- Bonaventura Genelli (1798–1868), German painter
- Bonaventura Gran (1620–1684), Spanish Franciscan friar, proclaimed blessed by the Catholic Church in 1906
- Bonaventura Ibáñez (1876–1932), Spanish film-actor of the silent and early sound eras
- Bonaventura Lamberti (1653–1721), Italian painter of the Baroque period, active mainly in Rome
- Bonaventura van Overbeek (1660–1705), Dutch Golden Age draughtsman and engraver
- Bonaventura Porta (1861–1953), Italian Bishop of the Roman Catholic Diocese of Pesaro
- Justinas Bonaventūra Pranaitis (1861–1917), Lithuanian Catholic priest, Russian Master of Theology and Professor of the Hebrew Language
- Bonaventura von Rauch (1740–1814), Prussian Army major-general
- Bonaventura Rubino (1600–1668), Italian composer
- Bonaventura Secusio O.F.M. Obs. (died March 1618), a Roman Catholic prelate who served as Bishop of Catania
- Bonaventura Tornielli O.S.M. (1411–1491), noble Italian priest and Roman Catholic preacher, beatified by Pope Pius X in 1911
- Bonaventura Vulcanius (1538–1614), a leading Dutch humanist
- Bonaventura, pseudonym of Ernst August Friedrich Klingemann (1777–1831), a German writer and theatre director
- Bonaventura Moller, inheritor (year 1625) of Bonaventura manor, located near Riga, Latvia

== See also ==
- Bonaventura (disambiguation)
- Bonaventura (surname)
- Bonaventure (disambiguation)
