= Santa Rosa de Quives District =

Coordinates: 11.6952°S 76.8470°W

Santa Rosa de Quives
- District
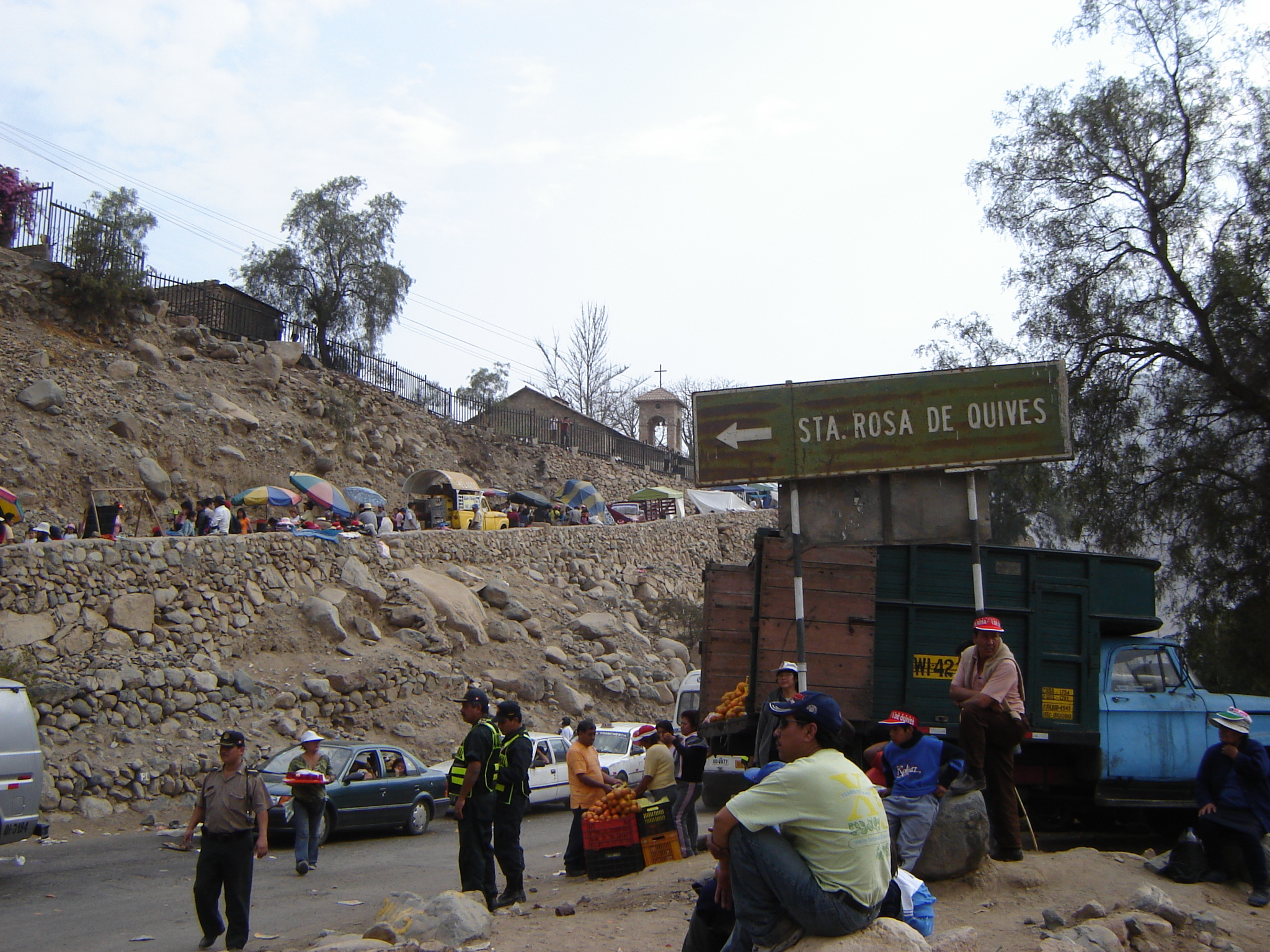
- Entrance to the village of Santa Rosa de Quives
- Interactive map of Santa Rosa de Quives
- Country: Peru
- Region: Lima
- Province: Canta
- Founded: January 16, 1952
- Capital: Yangas
- Subdivisions: 20 populated centers

Government
  - Mayor: Alfredo Solis Huaman (2019-2022)

Area
  - Total: 364.4 km^{2} (140.7 sq mi)
- Elevation: 940 m (3,080 ft)

Population (2017)
  - Total: 5,710
  - Density: 15.7/km^{2} (40.6/sq mi)
- Time zone: UTC-5 (PET)
- Website: munistarosaquives.gob.pe

Santa Rosa de Quives is a district in the middle of Canta Province, Lima Region in Peru. It is bordered by Carabayllo District on the west, Huamantanga District on the north, Lachaqui and Arahuay districts on the east, and Carabayllo District and Huarochirí Province on the south.

It is most known because is the place where the house of Santa Rosa de Lima, a very famous religious figure in Peru, is located. There is also the so-called Quives's water well where people can leave their letters to Santa Rosa de Lima.
