= Calichín =

- Theatrical release poster
- Directed by: Ricardo Maldonado
- Written by: César de María
- Produced by: Roxana Rivera
- Starring: Aldo Miyashiro; Zoe Arevalo; Miguel Iza Deza; Tulio Loza
- Cinematography: Miguel Valencia
- Edited by: Eric Williams
- Music by: Eduardo San Miguel
- Production company: Cine 70
- Release date: November 10, 2016
- Running time: 95 minutes
- Country: Peru
- Language: Spanish

Calichín is a 2016 Peruvian sports comedy film directed by Ricardo Maldonado and written by César de María. It is starring Aldo Miyashiro. It premiered on November 10, 2016, in Peruvian theaters. It can be seen on the Prime Video platform.

== Synopsis ==
Calichín Delgado (Miyashiro), a renowned soccer player returns to his country from Europe but in steep decline. His goal is to recover his former glory in a second division club in the Peruvian highlands and also his little daughter.

== Cast ==
The cast is composed of:

- Aldo Miyashiro
- Miguel Iza
- André Silva
- William Castaneda
- Irma Maury
- Ubaldo Huamán ("El cholo Cirilo")
- Zoe Arevalo
- Juliana Molina
- Tulio Loza
- Andy Merino "Andynsane"
- Gerardo Vasquez "Gerardo Pe'"
- Erick Osores (as guest)
- Natalie Vértiz (as guest)

== Production ==
The film was produced by Cine 70, production company Maldonado, director of the film. It was written by Cesar de Maria. Filmed in various locations, such as Lima, Canta, Lachaqui and Obrajillo, it was released on November 10, 2016. It also had the participation of the Peruvian YouTubers: Mox (José Romero), Andynsane (Andy Merino) and Gerardo Pe' (Gerardo Vásquez).
