= San Buenaventura =

San Buenaventura, Spanish for Saint Bonaventure, a Roman Catholic saint, may refer to:

== Places ==
=== Mexico ===
- San Buenaventura, Chihuahua
- San Buenaventura, Coahuila
  - San Buenaventura Municipality, Coahuila
- San Buenaventura, State of Mexico

=== Peru ===
- San Buenaventura District, Marañón
- San Buenaventura District, Canta

=== United States ===
- Ventura, California, the official name of which is San Buenaventura
  - Mission San Buenaventura, in Ventura
- San Buenaventura de Potano, a 17th-century Spanish mission in Florida
- San Buenaventura de Guadalquini, a 17th-century Spanish mission in Georgia
- San Buenaventura River (legend), a legendary river in the western United States

== Elsewhere ==
- San Buenaventura, La Paz, Bolivia
  - San Buenaventura Municipality, La Paz, Bolivia
- San Buenaventura, Usulután, El Salvador
- San Buenaventura, Francisco Morazán, Honduras
- San Buenaventura, a barangay or ward in San Pablo, Laguna, Philippines

== People with the surname ==
- Alonso de San Buenaventura, 16th century Franciscan missionary to Paraguay
- Joy San Buenaventura (born 1959), Filipino-born American politician

== See also ==
- Buenaventura (disambiguation)
