= Buenaventura =

Buenaventura (Spanish for 'good fortune', and the name of Saint Bonaventure) or Buena Ventura may refer to:

== People ==
- Buenaventura Báez (1812–1884), president of the Dominican Republic for five terms
- Buenaventura Bagaria (1882–1947), Spanish sports shooter
- Buenaventura Carlos Aribau (1798–1862), Spanish economist, writer and politician
- Buenaventura Cousiño Jorquera (1808–1855), Chilean politician
- Buenaventura de Abarzuza y Ferrer (1843–1910), Spanish diplomat
- Buenaventura Durruti (1896–1936), Spanish anarchist and hero of the Spanish Civil War
- Buenaventura Ferreira (born 1960), Paraguayan footballer
- Buenaventura Fernández de Córdoba Spínola (1724–1777), Spanish aristocrat and priest
- Buenaventura García de Paredes (1866–1936), Dominican priest
- Buenaventura Marcó del Pont (1738–1818), Spanish businessman
- Buenaventura S. Medina Jr. (born 1928), Filipino author
- Buenaventura Rodriguez (1893–1940), Filipino playwright and politician
- Buenaventura Sitjar (1739–1808), Franciscan missionary who served in California, U.S.
- Buenaventura Villamayor (born 1967), Filipino chess player
- Rafael Buenaventura (1938–2006), Filipino banker

== Places ==
- Buenaventura, Valle del Cauca, Colombia
- Buenaventura, Holguín, town in Holguín, Cuba
- Buenaventura, Camagüey, barrio in Santa Cruz del Sur, Cuba
- Buenaventura Municipality, Chihuahua, Mexico
- Buenaventura, Spain
- Buenaventura Lakes, Florida, U.S.
- Buenaventura Province, a former province of Gran Colombia
- Ventura, California, U.S.
- Buenaventura Forest, a nature reserve in Piñas Canton, Ecuador, which is home to 30 species of hummingbird, the rare El Oro parakeet and Ecuadorian tapaculo

== Other uses ==
- Buenaventura, a 2016 album by La Santa Cecilia
- "Buenaventura", a song by Paul van Dyk from the 2003 album Reflections
- Buenaventura River, a non-existent river once believed to run from the Rocky Mountains to the Pacific Ocean
- USS Buena Ventura (ID-1335), or USS Buenaventura, a U.S. Navy cargo ship sunk in WW1
- Buenaventura (mining company), a Peruvian mining company
- Buenaventura Press, an American publisher and distributor of comics and graphic novels

== See also ==
- San Buenaventura (disambiguation)
- Buenaventura Classic, a men's professional golf tournament
