= Bonaventure (disambiguation) =

Saint Bonaventure (John of Fidanza, 1221–1274) was an Italian philosopher and theologian.

Bonaventure, a French name (from Latin Bonaventura, meaning "good fortune") may also refer to:

== People ==
=== Given name ===
- Bonaventure of Siena (fl. 1264–1266), Italian notary and translator
- Bonaventure de Bar (1700–1729), French painter
- Bonaventure Baron (1610–1696), Irish Franciscan theologian, philosopher and writer of Latin prose and verse
- Bonaventure Broderick (1868–1943), the Coadjutor Bishop of the Archdiocese of San Cristóbal de la Habana
- Bonaventure Elzevir (1583–1652), Dutch publisher and printer
- Bonaventure Giffard (1642–1734), English Roman Catholic bishop
- Bonaventure Hepburn (1573–1620/1), Scottish linguist and biblical scholar
- Bonaventure Kalou (born 1978), Ivorian footballer
- Bonaventure Maruti (born 1976), a Kenyan football striker
- Bonaventure Panet (1765–1846), a businessman and politician in Lower Canada
- Bonaventure Patrick Paul (1929–2007), Pakistani bishop of the Roman Catholic Diocese of Hyderabad
- Bonaventure des Périers (c. 1501–1544), French author

=== Surname ===
- Simon-Pierre Denys de Bonaventure (1659–1711), French officer in the colonial navy of New France
- Ysaline Bonaventure, Belgian tennis player

== Places ==
=== Canada ===
- Bonaventure Regional County Municipality, Quebec
  - City of Bonaventure, Quebec, in the Bonaventure RCM
    - Bonaventure Airport, serving City of Bonaventure
  - Bonaventure River
- Bonaventure Island in the Gaspésie region on the Gulf of St. Lawrence
- Bonaventure (federal electoral district), a former federal electoral district
- Bonaventure (provincial electoral district), a Quebec provincial electoral district
- Place Bonaventure in Montreal which gave its name to
  - Bonaventure (Montreal Metro) station
  - Bonaventure Station, railway station in downtown Montreal, Quebec
- Autoroute Bonaventure (Quebec Autoroute 10), also called the Bonaventure Expressway
- Old and New Bonaventure, Newfoundland and Labrador, small communities
- Saint-Bonaventure, Quebec

=== United States ===
- St. Bonaventure, New York, a census-designated place and community in Allegany
- Westin Bonaventure Hotel, the largest hotel in Los Angeles, California
- Bonaventure Cemetery in Savannah, Georgia
- Bonaventure Plantation in Savannah, Georgia

== Entertainment ==
- Bonaventure, a play that was made into the 1951 film Thunder on the Hill
- St. Bonaventure Hospital, setting of The Good Doctor (U.S. TV series)

== Schools ==
- Saint Bonaventure's College in Newfoundland, Canada
- St. Bonaventure University, in Allegany, New York, US
- St Bonaventure's Catholic School, in Forest Gate, London Borough of Newham, UK
- St Bonaventure's High School, in Hyderabad, Sindh province, Pakistan
- St. Bonaventure High School, a private, Catholic, co-educational secondary school in Ventura, California, US
- St. Bonaventure Elementary School, a Catholic elementary school in Toronto, Ontario

== Ships ==
- Canadian aircraft carrier, HMCS Bonaventure (CVL 22)
- Nine warships of the Royal Navy have been named HMS Bonaventure

== Other ==
- Bonaventure station (disambiguation), stations of the name

== See also ==
- Pseudo-Bonaventure, a name given to various anonymous medieval writers whose writings were previously attributed to Saint Bonaventure
- Buenaventura (disambiguation)
- Bonaventura (disambiguation)
