= LNWR Prince of Wales Class =

Class of British steam locomotives

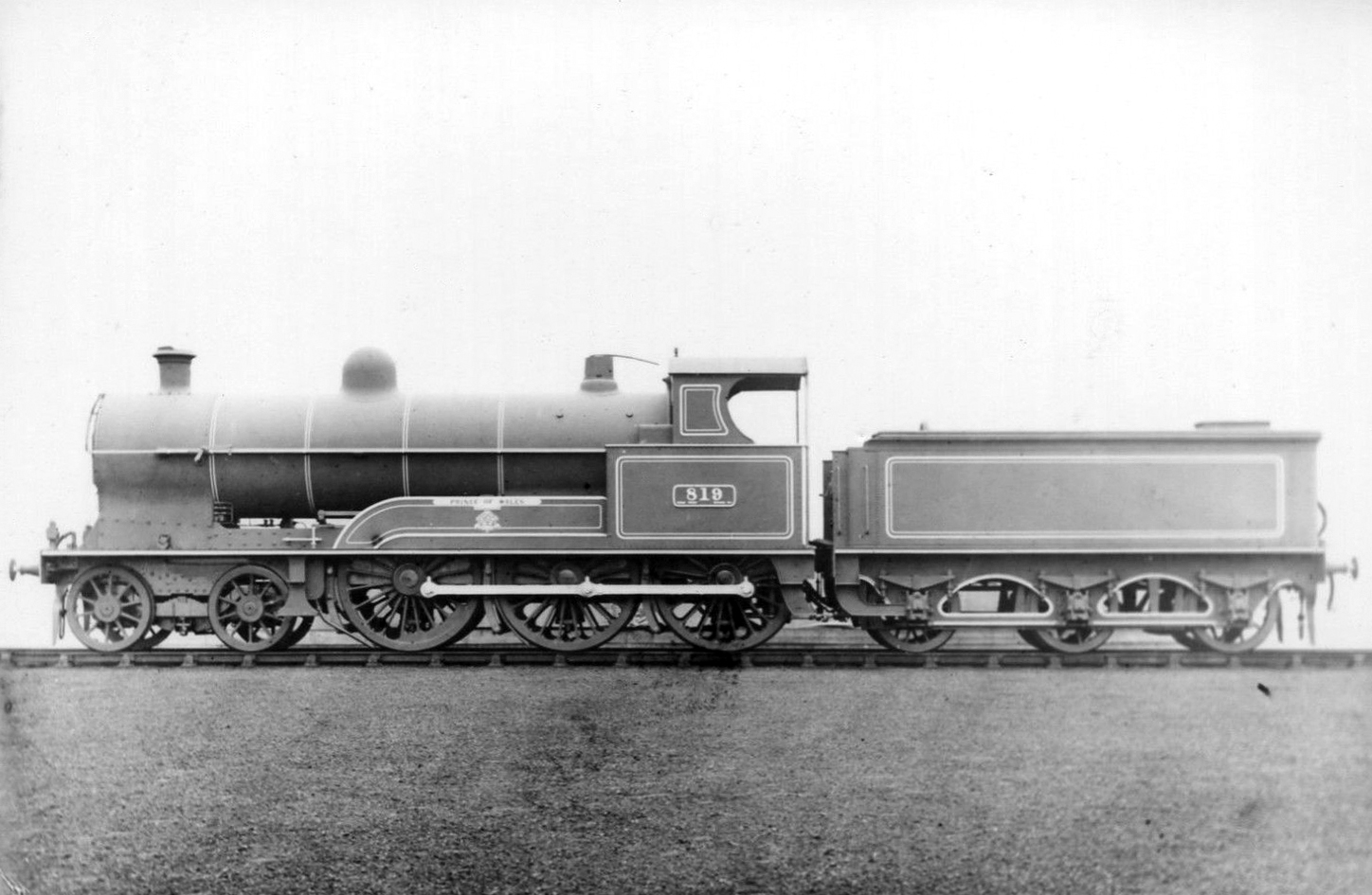
- No. 819 Prince of Wales in photographic grey livery
Type and origin
- Power type: Steam
- Designer: Charles Bowen-Cooke
- Builder: LNWR Crewe Works (135); North British Locomotive Co. (20); William Beardmore & Co. (91)
- Serial number: Crewe: 5030–5039, 5167–5196, 5297–5326, 5437–5501; NBL: 21256–21275; Beardmore: 174–263, 304
- Build date: 1911–1921, 1924
- Total produced: 246
Specifications
- Configuration
  - Whyte: 4-6-0
  - UIC: 2′C h2
- Gauge: 4 ft 8 1/2 in (1,435 mm)
- Leading dia.: 3 ft 9 in (1.143 m)
- Driver dia.: 6 ft 3 in (1.905 m)
- Loco weight: 66.50 long tons (67.6 t)
- Boiler pressure: 175 lbf/in^{2} (1.21 MPa)
- Heating surface: 1,816 sq ft (168.7 m^{2})
- Superheater: Schmidt
- Cylinders: Two, inside
- Cylinder size: 20 1/2 in × 26 in (521 mm × 660 mm)
- Valve gear: Joy, inside (some Walschaerts, outside)
- Valve type: 8-inch (200 mm) piston valves
Performance figures
- Tractive effort: 21,760 lbf (96.8 kN)
Career
- Operators: London and North Western Railway; London, Midland and Scottish Railway; British Railways
- Class: Prince of Wales
- Power class: LMS / BR: 3P
- Number in class: 1 January 1923: 245; 1 January 1948: 6
- Withdrawn: 1933–1949
- Disposition: All scrapped

The London and North Western Railway (LNWR) Prince of Wales Class was a class of express passenger locomotive. It was in effect, a superheated version of the Experiment Class 4-6-0.

== History ==
They were introduced in 1911 by Charles Bowen-Cooke. A total of 245 were built for the LNWR, of which 135 were built at Crewe between 1911 and 1919, and unusually for the LNWR, 110 were contracted out: 20 were built by the North British Locomotive Company in 1915–1916, and ninety were built by William Beardmore & Co. in 1921–1922.

The LNWR reused names and numbers from withdrawn locomotives, resulting in a very haphazard numbering system. All passed into London, Midland and Scottish Railway (LMS) ownership on the grouping in 1923. The LMS gave them the power classification 3P, and renumbered them into a more logical series of 5600–5844. The final locomotive was built by Beardmore in February 1924, which was displayed at the British Empire Exhibition that year; the LMS bought it in November 1924, and numbered it 5845. Later most of the class were again renumbered by the addition of 20000 into the 25600–25844 series in 1934–1935 to make room for Jubilee class locomotives.

The arrival of Stanier 4-6-0s also displaced them from their work so withdrawals which had started in 1933 meant that by 1939 only 22 remained. Withdrawals were suspended during World War II, but recommenced in 1944, and just six were inherited by British Railways in 1948. In March 1948, the four then remaining (25648 Queen of the Belgians, 25673 Lusitania, 25752 and 25787) were allocated the numbers 58000–3, but were all withdrawn before renumbering could be applied. (The majority of LMS engines had 40000 added to their numbers but doing so would have intruded on the 6xxxx ex-LNER series).

The LNWR also built a suburban pacific tank engine version - the LNWR Prince of Wales Tank Class.

Variations included Belpaire fireboxes from 1924, and outside Walschaerts valve gear was fitted to four engines in 1923–4 and also to no. 5845 from new, to drive the inside cylinders and valves.

Withdrawal of the class began in 1933, with the last surviving member of the class being LNWR No. 1100, which was built in March 1916 and was named Lusitania after the Cunard Liner which was sunk in May 1915. This member of the class became 5673 after 1923, then 25673 in 1948. It was allocated the number 58001 after nationalization in 1948, but was withdrawn and scrapped at Crewe Works in 1949 before it ever carried it.

None have been preserved.

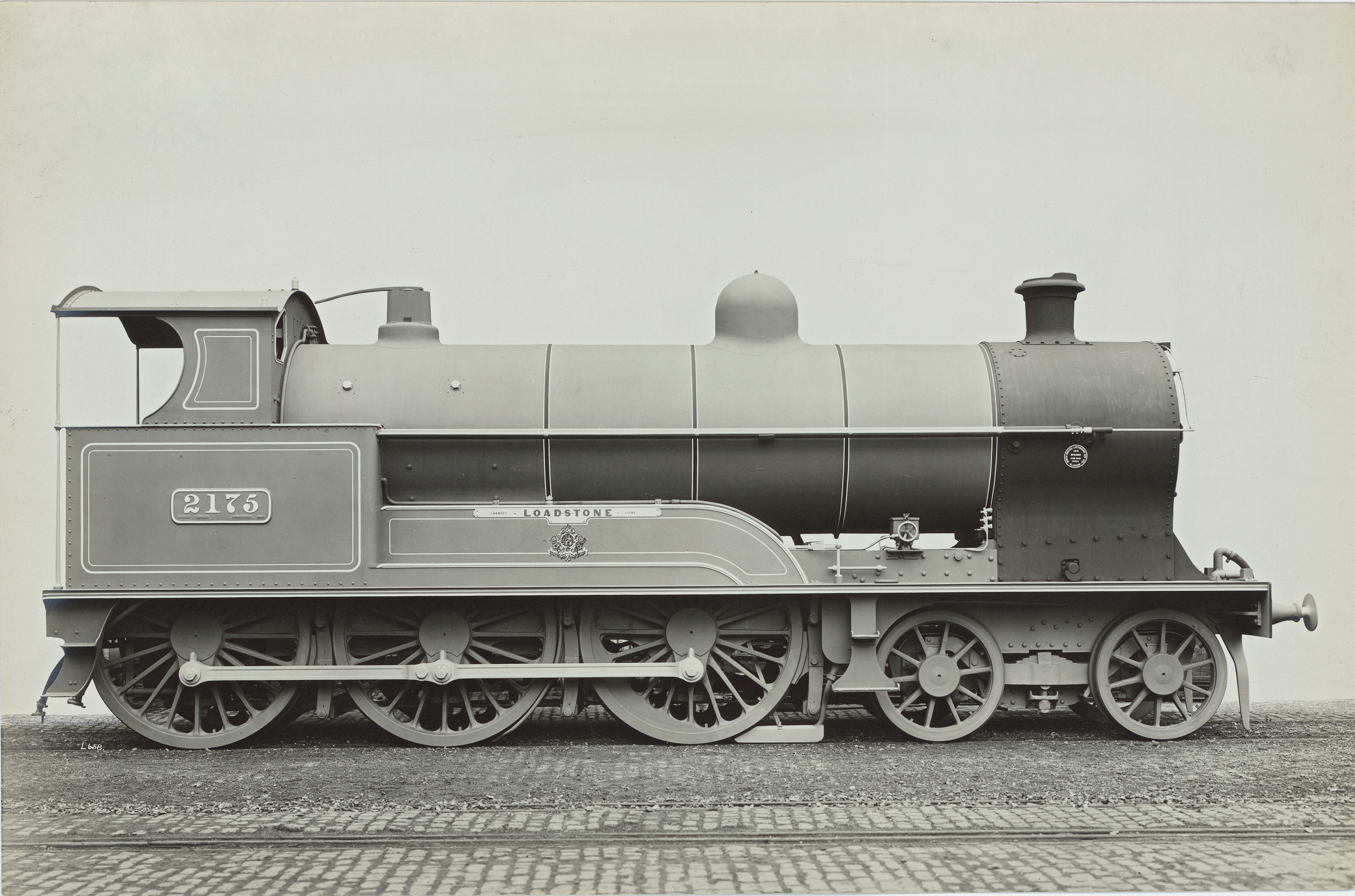
Prince of Wales class No. 2175 in 1915.

== Accidents and incidents ==
- On 28 September 1934, locomotive No. 25648 was hauling an express train which was in a rear en collision at Winwick Junction, Cheshire. It collided with the rear of a passenger train, hauled by LNWR 5ft 6in Tank Class 2-4-2T No. 6632. 11 people were killed and 19 people were injured.

- On 1 January 1946, locomotive No. 25802 was hauling a passenger train that was crashed into by a fish train, hauled by LMS Stanier Class 5 4-6-0 No. 5495, at Lichfield Trent Valley station, Staffordshire due to that train being derailed by defective points. Twenty people were killed and 21 were injured.

== Named locomotives ==
- See Named LNWR "Prince of Wales" Class locomotives
