= Obrajillo =

- Location in Peru
- Coordinates: 11.453°S 76.620°W
- Country: Peru
- Region: Lima
- Province: Canta
- District: Canta

Government
  - Mayor: Arturo Paredes Salcedo (2019-2022)

Population (1993)
  - Total: 181
- Time zone: UTC−5 (PET)

Obrajillo is a village belonging to the municipality of Canta, a two hours drive from Lima, Peru. The Chillón River cuts the settlement. The village is known for farming and selling truchas (trout).

Visitors can find dishes such as Tallarin con Perdiz, Cuyes, Patasca o Sopa de Mote. Moreover, visitors can buy cheese, butter, honey and meal. Obrajillo contains Internet and public telephones, markets and discos.

Near the electrical center is the waterfall, surrounded by many mountains where visitors can explore. There are many tourist facilities provided.
