= Slow water (hydrology) =

Slow water is a term popularized by science journalist Erica Gies in her 2022 book Water Always Wins: Thriving in an Age of Drought and Deluge to describe an emerging philosophy in water engineering and management that emphasizes working with natural hydrological processes rather than attempting to control, or accelerate, them. The slow water movement advocates for allowing water to move gradually through soils, wetlands, floodplains, and other natural systems so that it can infiltrate the ground, recharge aquifers, and support ecosystems. The concept encompasses established strategies like nature-based solutions, low-impact development, green infrastructure, and water-sensitive urban design which aim to retain, infiltrate, and slow water movement within the landscape.

Slow water strategies are contrasted by "fast water" infrastructure like dams, levees, storm water channels, and impervious surfaces that are designed to control and expedite the movement of water. The slow water approach aims to mitigate the unintended consequences of "fast water" systems, including habitat degradation, downstream flooding, reduced ground water recharge, and increased vulnerability to drought.

Slow water practices draw from both historical practices and indigenous knowledge systems that managed water in ways that were adaptive to local conditions. Slow water practices seek to restore the spatial and temporal dimensions of water movement, by allowing water to spread, linger, and infiltrate in landscapes where it has historically shaped ecological and cultural systems.

== Applications ==
- South Bay Salt Pond and Tidal Marsh Restoration, in California, United States
- Sponge city, an urban planning model in China
- Local amuna or mamanteo systems, a pre-Columbian water harvesting system in Peru
- Room for the River, a program in the Netherlands
