= Ch'aki Qucha (disambiguation) =

Ch'aki Qucha or Ch'akiqucha (Quechua ch'aki dry, qucha lake, "dry lake", also spelled Chaguicocha, Chaqui Khocha, Chaqui Kocha, Chaquicocha, Chaquiccocha, Chaquijocha) may refer to:

- Ch'aki Qucha, a mountain in the Potosí Department, Bolivia
- Ch'akiqucha, a mountain in the Cusco Region, Peru
- Ch'akiqucha (Lima), a mountain in the Lima Region, Peru
