= Mamanteo =

Seasonal water retention system using permeable ground cover for storage

A mamanteo or amuna is a pre-Columbian water harvesting system used in mountainous parts of Peru.

It works by 'delaying' rainy-season runoff in the mountains so it can be used in lowlands settlements during the dry season. Using canals, the system targets floods to permeable sections of soil or rock. The water is filtered by the ground layers and emerges in downslope springs weeks or months later, where it can be used to mitigate drought.

The technology may have been used by the Andean Wari culture as early as 700 AD, and some of the ancient systems have been restored in the 21st century to serve modern cities.

== Modern restoration work ==
Lima is the world's second-largest desert city, behind Cairo, and served by a much smaller river than Cairo. To meet the needs of a 'desert city which keeps growing', Sunass, the Peruvian national water agency, intends to '[combine] grey infrastructure with green infrastructure' and has created a tax-supported PES fund; some of this money has gone to regrouting mamanteos. As of 2016, ten mamanteos had been restored.

A study of the system in Huamantanga, Peru modeled an expansion to serve modern Lima, claiming it could extend the growing season for local farms. The study authors measured the amount of water stored and the time taken to deliver the water downslope, and proposed an extrapolation model to estimate large-scale effects of up-scaling the system.

A climate risk study by Peruvian hydrology agencies includes the restoration of amunas on its shortlist of adaptive practices that have 'low cost and high hydrological benefit', along with management of grasslands, restoration of wetlands and forests, and other hydrological engineering projects.

== See also ==
- Qanat—an ancient Persian irrigation system for bringing wellwater downslope
