= Arahuay =

Coordinates: 11°37′20″S 76°40′10″W

Arahuay is a village in Canta Province, Lima Region, Peru, South America. It is the seat of Arahuay District. Its geographical coordinates are 11° 37' 20" South, 76° 40' 10" West. "Arahuay is located 22 kilometres away from Santa Rosa de Quives, at over 2300 metres above sea level, and pierced over a small valley. The small town is surrounded by pre-Inca archaeological remains and a cluster of blue lagoons."

== One Laptop Per Child ==
Arahuay is the town where the first Peru OLPC pilot was implemented in 2007. "Since May 2007 Peru has been evaluating the XO laptop with 60 school children in Arahuay, a remote agricultural village in the Andes mountains."
