= Bonaventure station (disambiguation) =

Bonaventure station is an intermodal transit station in Montreal, Quebec, Canada.

Bonaventure station may also refer to:

- Bonaventure Station (1887–1952), a former train station in Montreal, Quebec, Canada
- Bonaventure station (Via Rail), a former train station in Bonaventure, Quebec, Canada

== See also ==
- Bonaventura station, a light rail station in San Jose, California
- Bonaventure (disambiguation)
