= Ch'akiqucha (Lima) =

Mountain in Peru

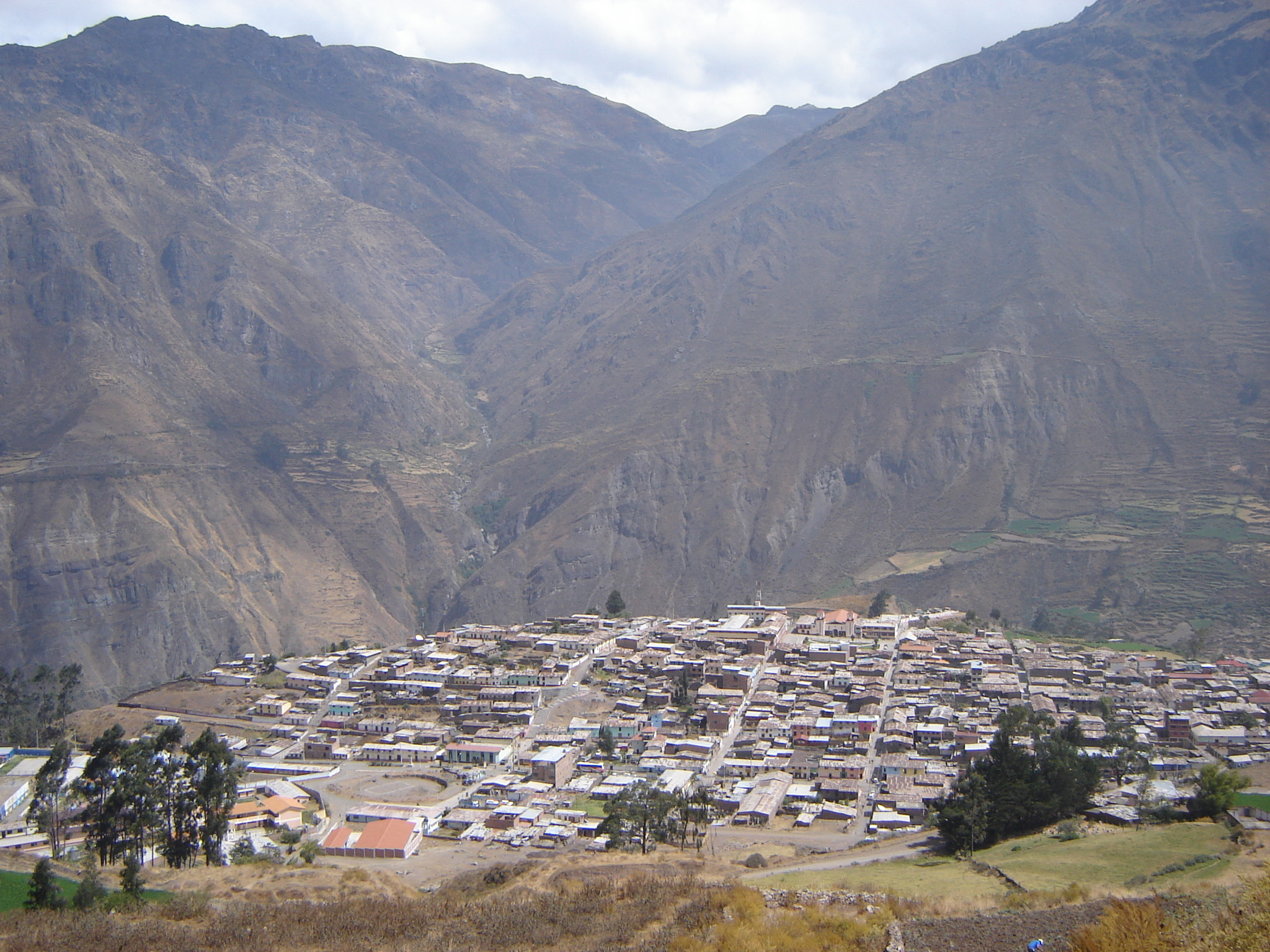
- The town of Canta with Ch'akiqucha in the background (on the right)

Highest point
- Elevation: 4,200 m (13,800 ft)
- Coordinates: 11°26′18″S 76°38′21″W

Geography
- Location within Peru
- Location: Peru, Junín Region, Lima Region
- Parent range: Andes

Ch'akiqucha (Quechua ch'aki dry, qucha lake, "dry lake", hispanicized spelling Chaquicocha) is a mountain in the Andes of Peru which reaches an altitude of approximately 4,200 metres (13,780 ft). It is located in the Lima Region, Canta Province, San Buenaventura District. Ch'akiqucha lies at the Chillón River northwest of the town of Canta.
