= Named LNWR "Prince of Wales" Class locomotives =

Throughout its existence the London and North Western Railway re-used the numbers and names of withdrawn locomotives on new ones as they came out of Crewe Works. This resulted in each class of locomotives being allotted numbers virtually at random, with names that adhered to no discernible theme. By 1911 new locomotives were being produced at a much faster rate than old ones were being scrapped, and it became necessary to introduce a new set of names for Bowen Cooke’s 4-6-0 express engines which were beginning to enter service.

On 13 July 1911 Prince Edward, the future King Edward VIII, was invested as Prince of Wales at Caernarfon Castle. The investiture gave the LNWR an opportunity to name the first of the locomotives (and the class) in honour of the new Prince. A further nine engines were built during 1911 and given names associated with ships of the Royal Navy, in keeping with the patriotic sentiments of the time.

The second batch of 30 locomotives of 1913 and early 1914 commemorated British, European and American poets and novelists of the 18th and 19th centuries. The final engine of the batch was named G. P. Neele in honour of the former LNWR Superintendent of the Line, who had retired in 1895.

The ten engines produced in 1915 were given the names of the leaders of Britain’s allies in the Great War, and the names of two soldiers, a sailor, and a nurse who had been executed by the Germans. By the beginning of 1916 sufficient engines had been scrapped to enable the re-use of historical LNWR names. However in March and April of that year three locomotives were named in remembrance of the ill-fated campaign in the Dardanelles, and seven were named to commemorate maritime losses of 1915 and 1916.

The next batch of locomotives entered service in January 1919, by which time a decision had been taken not to allocate names until matters had returned to normal after the war. It was not until 1922 that another twelve engines were given names taken from former LNWR engines.

During 1921 and 1922 a further 90 locomotives of the class were built by William Beardmore and Company at Dalmuir. These remained nameless.

Following the amalgamation of the LNWR with several other railways to create the London, Midland and Scottish Railway at the beginning of 1923, the LMS Rolling Stock Committee at Derby issued Minute no. 53 on 31 May 1923 which announced that in conformity with former Midland Railway practices

“Passenger engines and coaching stock to be painted in old Midland crimson lake, goods engines to be black without lining – new engines not to be named but those with names will continue to do so.”

One of the last locomotives to be named at Crewe was No. 5753 Premier, a clear reference to the LNWR slogan of being "the Premier Line", and a final and defiant gesture aimed at the new management in Derby.

The LMS renumbered all of the Prince of Wales in a block from 5600 to 5844, but not in exactly the same order that the locomotives had been built. A final locomotive was built by Beardmore in February 1924, which was displayed at the British Empire Exhibition that year; the LMS bought it in November 1924, and numbered it 5845.

LNWR Number	Maker	Works No.	Name	Entered Service	LMS Number	Date withdrawn	Notes
819	Crewe	5030	Prince of Wales	October 1911	5600	October 1933	
1388	Crewe	5031	Andromeda	October 1911	5601	March 1935	
1452	Crewe	5032	Bonaventure	October 1911	5602	June 1937	
1454	Crewe	5033	Coquette	November 1911	5603	January 1935	
1537	Crewe	5034	Enchantress	November 1911	5604	October 1934	
1691	Crewe	5035	Pathfinder	November 1911	5605	November 1934	
1704	Crewe	5036	Conqueror	November 1911	5606	October 1933	
1721	Crewe	5037	Defiance	November 1911	5607	December 1934	
2021	Crewe	5038	Wolverine	December 1911	5608	February 1935	
2359	Crewe	5039	Hermione	December 1911	5609	October 1933	
362	Crewe	5167	Robert Southey	October 1913	5610	October 1933	
892	Crewe	5168	Charles Wolfe	October 1913	5611	June 1935	
1081	Crewe	5169	John Keats	October 1913	5612	January 1936	
1089	Crewe	5170	Sydney Smith	October 1913	5613	February 1935	
1134	Crewe	5171	Victor Hugo	October 1913	5614	December 1934	
2040	Crewe	5172	Oliver Goldsmith	November 1913	5615	March 1935	
2075	Crewe	5173	Robert Burns	November 1913	5616	November 1934	
2198	Crewe	5174	John Ruskin	November 1913	5620	March 1936	
2205	Crewe	5175	Thomas Moore	November 1913	5621	August 1934	
2213	Crewe	5176	Charles Kingsley	November 1913	5622	October 1933	
321	Crewe	5177	Henry W. Longfellow	November 1913	5617	January 1935	
479	Crewe	5178	Thomas B. Macaulay	December 1913	5618	February 1935	
951	Crewe	5179	Bulwer Lytton	December 1913	5619	August 1934	
1679	Crewe	5180	Lord Byron	December 1913	5623	May 1935	
2249	Crewe	5181	Thomas Campbell	December 1913	5624	March 1937	
2283	Crewe	5182	Robert L. Stevenson	December 1913	5625	December 1936	
307	Crewe	5183	R. B. Sheridan	December 1913	5628	November 1934	
637	Crewe	5184	Thomas Gray	December 1913	5629	December 1934	
979	Crewe	5185	W. M. Thackeray	January 1914	5630	September 1934	
1400	Crewe	5186	Felicia Hemans	January 1914	5631	June 1936	
86	Crewe	5187	Mark Twain	January 1914	5626	May 1936	
146	Crewe	5188	Lewis Carroll	January 1914	5627	July 1936	
964	Crewe	5189	Bret Harte	February 1914	5632	September 1933	
985	Crewe	5190	Sir W. S. Gilbert	February 1914	5633	August 1935	
1321	Crewe	5191	William Cowper	February 1914	5634	September 1934	
2152	Crewe	5192	Charles Lamb	February 1914	5635	March 1934	
2293	Crewe	5193	Percy Bysshe Shelley	February 1914	5636	January 1935	
2377	Crewe	5194	Edward Gibbon	February 1914	5637	December 1936	
2443	Crewe	5195	Charles James Lever	March 1914	5638	April 1936	
2520	Crewe	5196	G. P. Neele	March 1914	5639	October 1933	
136	NBL	21256	Minerva	October 1915	5663	January 1935	
173	NBL	21257	Livingstone	October 1915	5664	February 1935	
257	NBL	21258	Plynlimmon	November 1915	5666	September 1934	
446	NBL	21259	Pegasus	November 1915	5668	August 1935	
1749	NBL	21260	Precedent	November 1915	5677	January 1935	
2063	NBL	21261	Hibernia	November 1915	5679	May 1935	
2175	NBL	21262	Loadstone	November 1915	5680	June 1937	
2203	NBL	21263	Falstaff	November 1915	5681	June 1935	
2300	NBL	21264	Hotspur	December 1915	5687	September 1934	
2392	NBL	23265	Caliban	December 1915	5689	September 1936	
90	NBL	21266	Kestrel	December 1915	5660	August 1936	
401	NBL	21267	Zamiel	December 1915	5667	November 1934	
525	NBL	21268	Vulcan	December 1915	5669	April 1937	
610	NBL	21269	Albion	December 1915	5670	October 1935	
867	NBL	21270	Condor	January 1916	5672	December 1936	Name removed, July 1933
1132	NBL	21271	Scott	January 1916	5674	February 1946	
1466	NBL	21272	Sphinx	January 1916	5675	August 1936	
1744	NBL	21273	Petrel	January 1916	5676	April 1935	
2055	NBL	21274	Milton	January 1916	5678	April 1935	
2339	NBL	21275	Samson	January 1916	5682	April 1935	Name removed, July 1933
27	Crewe	5297	General Joffre	October 1915	5640	February 1937	
88	Crewe	5298	Czar of Russia	October 1915	5641	September 1936	
122	Crewe	5299	King of the Belgians	November 1915	5642	March 1936	
160	Crewe	5300	King of Serbia	November 1915	5643	October 1934	
185	Crewe	5301	King of Italy	November 1915	5644	March 1936	
877	Crewe	5302	Raymond Poincaré	November 1915	5645	June 1936	
1333	Crewe	5303	Sir John French	November 1915	5646	December 1934	
2275	Crewe	5304	Edith Cavell	November 1915	5647	January 1935	
2396	Crewe	5305	Queen of the Belgians	December 1915	5648	October 1948	
2408	Crewe	5306	Admiral Jellicoe	December 1915	5649	October 1933	
606	Crewe	5307	Castor	January 1916	5650	April 1936	
745	Crewe	5308	Pluto	January 1916	5651	July 1934	
352	Crewe	5309	The Nile	January 1916	5653	October 1935	
379	Crewe	5310	Witch	January 1916	5654	March 1935	
484	Crewe	5311	Smeaton	January 1916	5655	December 1934	
810	Crewe	5312	Onyx	January 1916	5652	September 1933	
884	Crewe	5313	Shark	January 1916	5656	August 1938	
346	Crewe	5314	Trent	January 1916	5657	April 1936	
417	Crewe	5315	Atlas	January 1916	5658	October 1935	Name removed, July 1933
442	Crewe	5316	Odin	February 1916	5659	March 1935	
95	Crewe	5317	Gallipoli	March 1916	5661	February 1935	
126	Crewe	5318	Anzac	March 1916	5662	August 1936	
233	Crewe	5319	Suvla Bay	March 1916	5665	April 1936	
849	Crewe	5320	Arethusa	March 1916	5671	December 1936	Name removed, September 1936
1100	Crewe	5321	Lusitania	March 1916	5673	January 1949	
1324	Crewe	5322	Falaba	April 1916	5683	January 1946	
2092	Crewe	5323	Arabic	April 1916	5684	March 1936	
2276	Crewe	5234	Persia	April 1916	5685	August 1936	
2295	Crewe	5325	Anglia	April 1916	5686	November 1934	
2340	Crewe	5326	Tara	April 1916	5688	September 1933	
940	Crewe	5444	Richard Cobden	January 1919	5697	July 1936	Named in 1922
621	Crewe	5447	Telford	February 1919	5700	March 1936	Named in 1922
1584	Crewe	5451	Scotia	March 1919	5704	September 1936	Named in 1922
504	Crewe	5453	Canning	March 1919	5706	December 1936	Named in 1922
974	Crewe	5454	Hampden	March 1919	5707	April 1935	Named in 1922
522	Crewe	5470	Stentor	June 1919	5723	January 1936	Named in 1922
1290	Crewe	5475	Lucknow	July 1919	5729	February 1935	Named in 1922
1325	Crewe	5483	Disraeli	August 1919	5736	June 1935	Named in 1922
1178	Crewe	5489	Prince Albert	September 1919	5743	September 1934	Named in 1922
1542	Crewe	5597	Marathon	November 1919	5750	March 1936	Named in 1922
1694	Crewe	5500	Premier	November 1919	5753	February 1936	Named in 1922
2516	Crewe	5501	Dalton	November 1919	5754	May 1935	Named in 1922
