= Buenaventura Province =

Coordinates: 3°27′N 76°32′W

1855

Buenaventura Province was one of the provinces of Gran Colombia. It belonged to the Cauca Department which was created in 1824. In 1857 Cauca State was declared and the province was one of its provinces.
