= Bonaventura Heinz House (first) =

Historic house in Iowa, United States

- Formerly listed on the U.S. National Register of Historic Places
- Location: 1128 W. 5th St. Davenport, Iowa
- Built: c. 1850
- Architectural style: Vernacular
- MPS: Davenport MRA
- NRHP reference No.: 84001435

Significant dates
- Added to NRHP: April 5, 1984
- Removed from NRHP: July 22, 2005

The Bonaventura Heinz House (first) was located in the West End of Davenport, Iowa, United States. It was listed on the National Register of Historic Places in 1984. The property was removed from the Register in 2005. The house was a brick, side-gable structure with a five-bay symmetrical front. At one time it had a full front porch. It was typical of Davenport's working-class houses from the decades of the city's early settlement. Heinz moved to the adjoining house, the Bonaventura Heinz House (second). The family continued to own this property until 1907. It has subsequently been torn down.
