= Arahuay District =

Coordinates: 11.6213°S 76.6703°W

Arahuay Araway
- District
- Interactive map of Arahuay
- Country: Peru
- Region: Lima
- Province: Canta
- Capital: Arahuay

Government
  - Mayor: Davis Ivan Carrillo Velazco

Area
  - Total: 134.29 km^{2} (51.85 sq mi)
- Elevation: 2,505 m (8,219 ft)

Population (2017)
  - Total: 596
  - Density: 4.44/km^{2} (11.5/sq mi)
- Time zone: UTC-5 (PET)
- UBIGEO: 150402

Arahuay District is one of seven districts of the province Canta in Peru.
