= CVV 8 Bonaventura =

Italian competition glider

Bonaventura
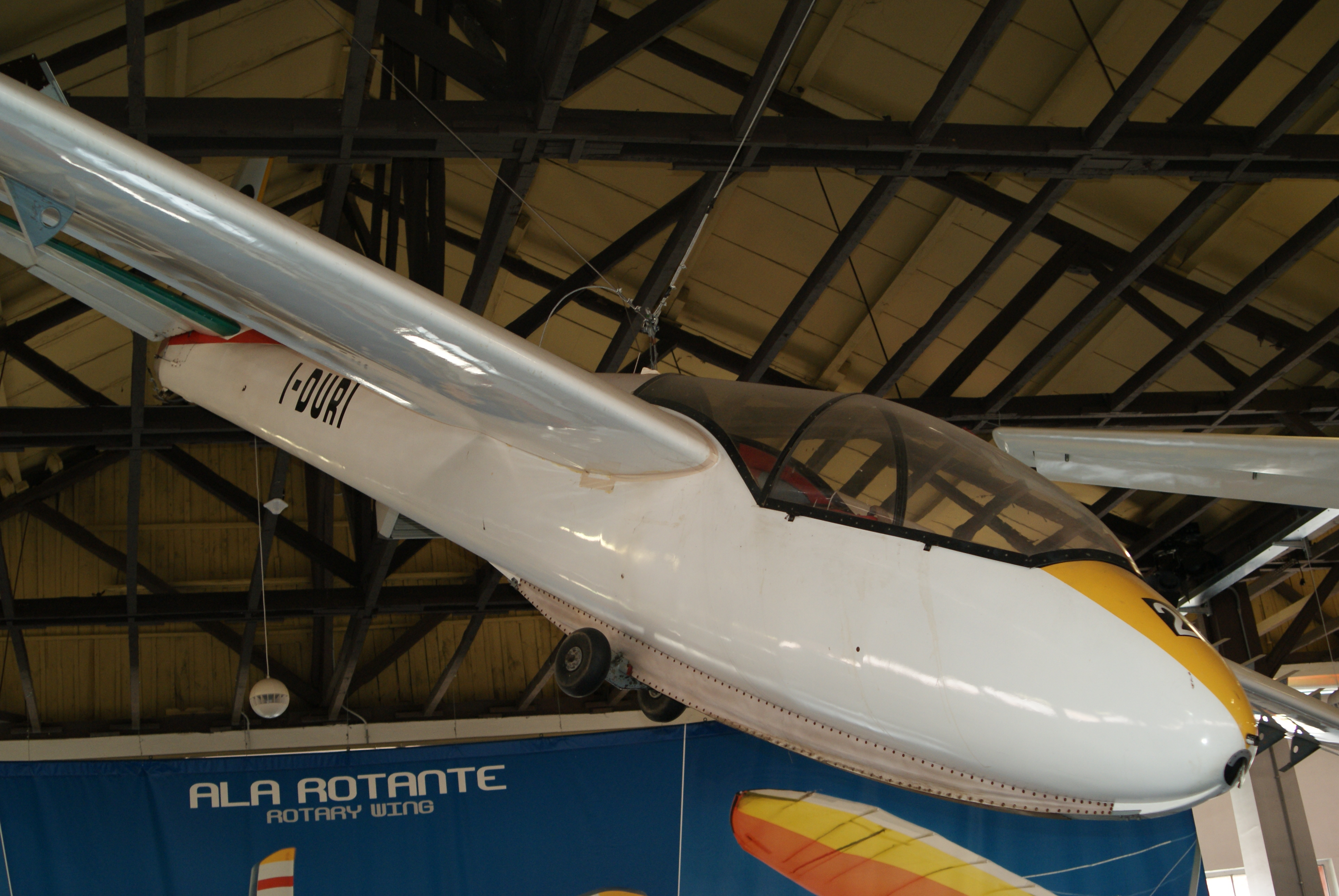

General information
- Type: Two seat competition glider
- National origin: Italy
- Manufacturer: Centro Volo a Vela, Milan (CVV)
- Designer: Ermenegildo Preti
- Number built: 15

History
- First flight: 29 December 1957

The CVV 8 Bonaventura (English: Good Adventure) was a two-seat competition glider designed and built in Italy during the 1950s. Fifteen were produced.

== Design and development ==
The Bonaventura was designed at the Centro Volo a Vela (CVV), or Experimental Soaring Centre, of the Royal Polytechnic of Milan by Gildo Preti; though construction was started in 1952, the prototype was not completed until 1957. The first flight took place on 14 December that year. It was named after the fortunate eponymous protagonist of an Italian children's comic strip, Signor Bonaventura.

The Bonaventura is an all wood aircraft with a 19 m (62 ft 4 in) span, shoulder mounted wing, built around a single spar. Its airfoil section is from the NACA laminar flow 6-series. Ahead of the spar, the wing is skinned with plywood laid with its grain at 45° to the centre line for strength; this goes around the nose of the wing, forming a torsion resisting D-box. Behind the spar the wing is fabric covered. The plan is essentially double straight tapered, though a short centre section has a leading edge normal to the fuselage centre line, and a trailing edge slightly more forward sweep than outboard. Long, narrow chord ailerons occupy about half the span; airbrakes are placed immediately inboard of the ailerons at mid-chord. These consist of seven rotating blades on each side which project both above and below the wing when deployed, counter-rotating away on chord-wise axes.

The fuselage is a ply shell, ovoid in cross section and built around a series of frames and stringers. The tandem seats are enclosed ahead of the wing leading edge under a starboard hinged, continuous canopy. The Bonaventura has no wheeled undercarriage, but took off from a wheeled, drop-off dolly and landed on a simple, rubber sprung skid extending from nose to mid chord, aided by a sprung tail skid. The fuselage becomes slim towards the tail, where the double straight tapered horizontal tail is mounted on top of it, far enough forward that its trailing edge is at the rudder hinge. The elevators are fabric covered and the starboard one carries a trim tab. Fin and rudder are also straight tapered and the tall, fabric covered, unbalanced rudder reaches down to the keel.

== Operational history ==
Two Bonaventura prototypes were built by CVV, followed by a short production run of thirteen from Avionautica Rio. These went to Italian gliding clubs. Three Bonaventuras survive in museum collections, though none were on public display in 2010.

== Specifications ==
Data from Italian Vintage Sailplanes

General characteristics

- Crew: One
- Length: 7.91 m (25 ft 11 in)
- Wingspan: 19.0 m (62 ft 4 in)
- Wing area: 20 m^{2} (220 sq ft)
- Aspect ratio: 18
- Airfoil: root:NACA 65_{3}618; tip: NACA 63-612
- Empty weight: 295 kg (650 lb)
- Gross weight: 475 kg (1,047 lb)

Performance

- Never exceed speed: 220 km/h (140 mph, 120 kn)
- Maximum glide ratio: estimated 36.7:1
- Wing loading: 24 kg/m^{2} (4.9 lb/sq ft)
