= Canta District =

Coordinates: 11.4655°S 76.6247°W

Canta
- District
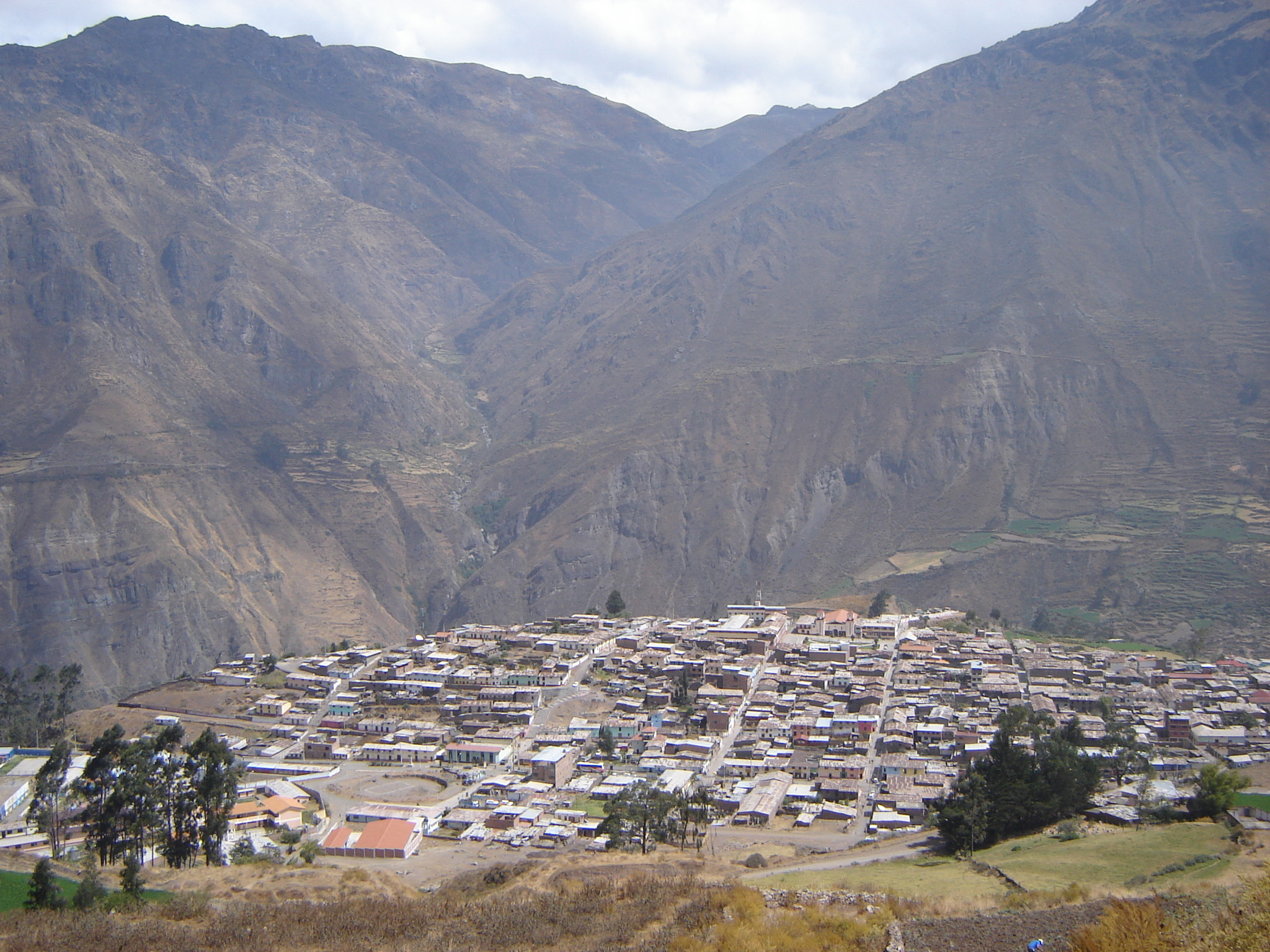
- Interactive map of Canta
- Country: Peru
- Region: Lima
- Province: Canta
- Capital: Canta

Government
  - Mayor: Arturo Paredes Salcedo (2019-2022)

Area
  - Total: 123.09 km^{2} (47.53 sq mi)
- Elevation: 2,819 m (9,249 ft)

Population (2017)
  - Total: 2,385
  - Density: 19.38/km^{2} (50.18/sq mi)
- Time zone: UTC-5 (PET)
- UBIGEO: 150401

Canta District is one of seven districts of the province Canta in Peru.

== See also ==
- Tarapu
