= USS Buena Ventura =

Cargo ship of the United States Navy

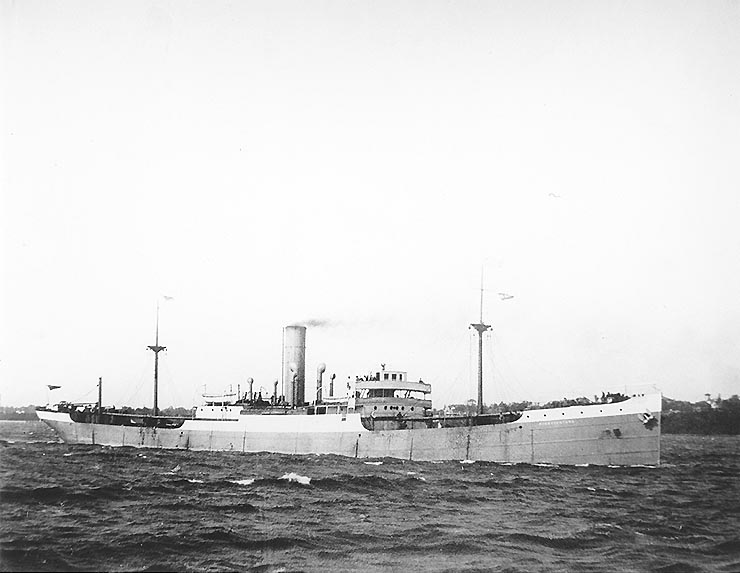
- SS Buena Ventura (or Buenaventura, as painted on her bow in this photograph) in commercial service prior to World War I.

History

United States
- Name: USS Buena Ventura (or Buenaventura)
- Namesake: Spanish for "Good Fortune," and the name of a seaport in Colombia (previous name retained)
- Builder: Northumberland Shipbuilding Company, Howdon-on-Tyne
- Launched: 23 January 1913
- Completed: 1913
- Acquired: 25 July 1918
- Commissioned: 26 July 1918
- Fate: Torpedoed and sunk, 16 September 1918
- Notes: In commercial service, 1913-1918

General characteristics
- Type: Cargo ship
- Tonnage: 4,881 Gross register tons
- Displacement: 8,200 long tons (8,300 t)
- Length: 410 ft (120 m)
- Beam: 52 ft (16 m)
- Draft: 25 ft (7.6 m) (mean)
- Propulsion: Steam engine(s)
- Speed: 10 kn (12 mph; 19 km/h)
- Complement: 93
- Armament: 1 × 5 in (130 mm) gun, 1 × 6-pounder gun

USS Buena Ventura (ID-1329), also spelled USS Buenaventura, was a United States Navy cargo ship in commission in 1918 that was sunk during World War I.

== Construction and early career, 1913-1918 ==
Buena Ventura was built as a commercial cargo ship in 1913 at Howdon-on-Tyne, England, by Northumberland Shipbuilding Company. The United States Steel Products Company of New York City owned her when the United States Shipping Board requisitioned her for World War I service in 1917. The Shipping Board assigned her to the United States Army, for which she began operations in 1917 with a United States Navy Naval Armed Guard detachment aboard to man her guns.

== United States Navy service, 1918 ==
Buena Ventura was transferred to the U.S. Navy on 25 July 1918. Assigned the naval registry Identification Number (Id. No.) 1335, she was commissioned as USS Buena Ventura (or USS Buenaventura) at Philadelphia, Pennsylvania on 26 July 1918.

Buena Ventura was assigned to the Naval Overseas Transportation Service on a U.S. Army account. After loading cargo at Philadelphia, she departed for New York City on 9 August 1918, then left New York in a convoy on 13 August 1918 bound for France. Steaming first to La Pallice and from there to Royan and Bordeaux, she proceeded to Le Verdon-sur-Mer to take on fuel for the return voyage to Philadelphia.

Buena Ventura cleared Le Verdon-Sur-mer in ballast on 14 September 1918 as part of a 25-ship convoy bound for the United States. Seven escorts protected the convoy until that evening, after which the convoy continued across the Atlantic Ocean unescorted.

== Loss ==
At about 20:45 on 16 September 1918, the German submarine U-46 came across the unescorted convoy and fired two torpedoes into Buena Ventura. The first struck amidships, directly beneath the flying bridge about 4 ft (1.2 m) below the waterline and tore a hole that measured 10 ft (3.0 m) long by 4–6 ft (1.2–1.8 m) wide. The blast from the explosion coursed upward, splintering the lifeboat suspended in its davits just above and knocking the Wireless out of commission. The second torpedo hit in the after end of the empty hold number four.

Buena Ventura, mortally stricken, soon slowed in the rising swells, listing to port. Her siren blasted out the submarine warning signal while her after gun fired one shot. After throwing the confidential publications and codes overboard in weighted bags, the crew abandoned their rapidly sinking ship in the four undamaged lifeboats. Her commanding officer – Lt. Cdr. Fitzsimons – remained on board to be sure that everyone who could abandon ship had done so and, when thus assured, stepped into the last boat and ordered it lowered away. That boat, damaged in bumping against the side of the ship due to the Buena Ventura's port list, required unceasing efforts to bale out the water that had gained entry through several leaks. Fitzsimons, his executive officer, and the 27 enlisted men in the boat, separated from the other three boats in the darkness and rising seas, steered in the direction of the Spanish coast.

On 18 September, the French destroyer Temeraire rescued 45 of Buena Ventura's crew, while on the morning of 20 September, the Spanish coaster Lola took Fitzsimons and his remaining sailors on board and landed them at Corunna, Spain on 22 September.

== Casualties ==
Three officers and 15 or 16 enlisted men died in the loss of Buena Ventura.
