= Bonaventura Cerronio =

Italian composer (fl. 1639)

Bonaventura Cerronio (fl. 1639) was an Italian composer. Little is known of his life.
