= Lachaqui District =

Coordinates: 11.5529°S 76.6266°W

Lachaqui Lachaki
- District
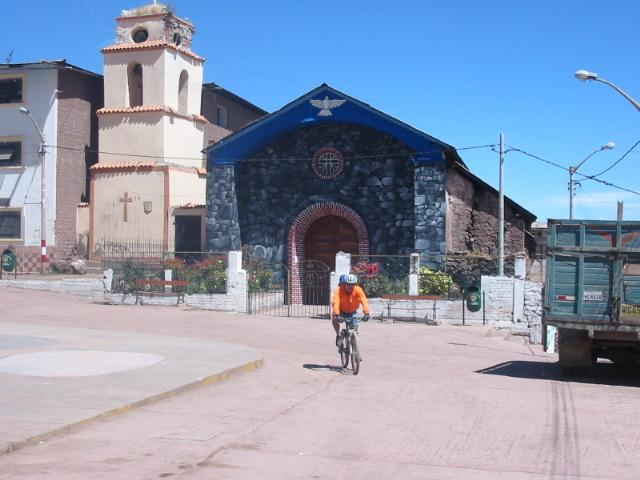
- Church of Lachaqui
- Interactive map of Lachaqui
- Country: Peru
- Region: Lima
- Province: Canta
- Founded: January 16, 1952
- Capital: Lachaqui

Government
  - Mayor: Idilio Astocóndor

Area
  - Total: 137.87 km^{2} (53.23 sq mi)
- Elevation: 3,668 m (12,034 ft)

Population (2017)
  - Total: 856
  - Density: 6.21/km^{2} (16.1/sq mi)
- Time zone: UTC-5 (PET)
- UBIGEO: 150405

Lachaqui District is one of seven districts of the province Canta in Peru.
