= Buenaventura, Spain =

Village in Toledo Province, Castile-La Mancha, Spain

Coordinates: 40°10′N 4°50′W

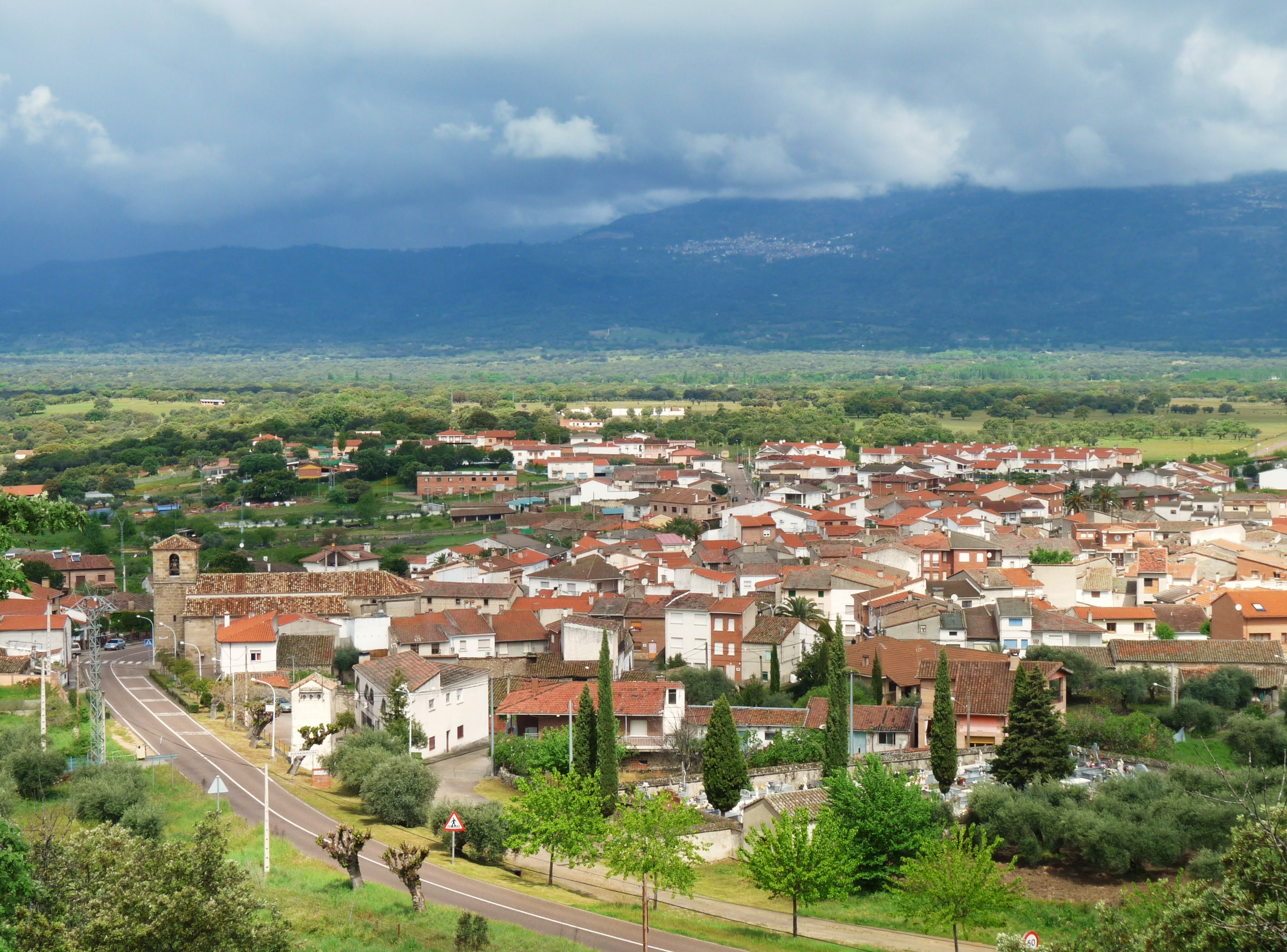
Buenaventura

Flag of Buenaventura, Spain

Coat of arms of Buenaventura, Spain

Buenaventura is a village in the province of Toledo and autonomous community of Castile-La Mancha, Spain.

== Demographics ==
Historical population
Year	Pop.	±%
1900	740	—
1910	816	+10.3%
1920	770	−5.6%
1930	881	+14.4%
1940	972	+10.3%
1950	1,026	+5.6%
1960	910	−11.3%
1970	608	−33.2%
1981	531	−12.7%
1991	540	+1.7%
2001	534	−1.1%
2011	482	−9.7%
2021	419	−13.1%
2023	377	−10.0%
Source: ISTAT
