= Bonaventure de Bar =

18th-century French painter

Bonaventure de Bar (1700 – September 1, 1729) was a French painter who painted after the manner of Watteau. Born in Paris, Bar was a pupil of Claude Guy Halle. He became a member of the Academy at Paris in September 1728, or December 1727, and his reception painting, a Fête Champêtre, is in the Louvre. He died on September 1, 1729.
