= Bonaventura Heinz House (second) =

Historic house in Iowa, United States

- U.S. National Register of Historic Places
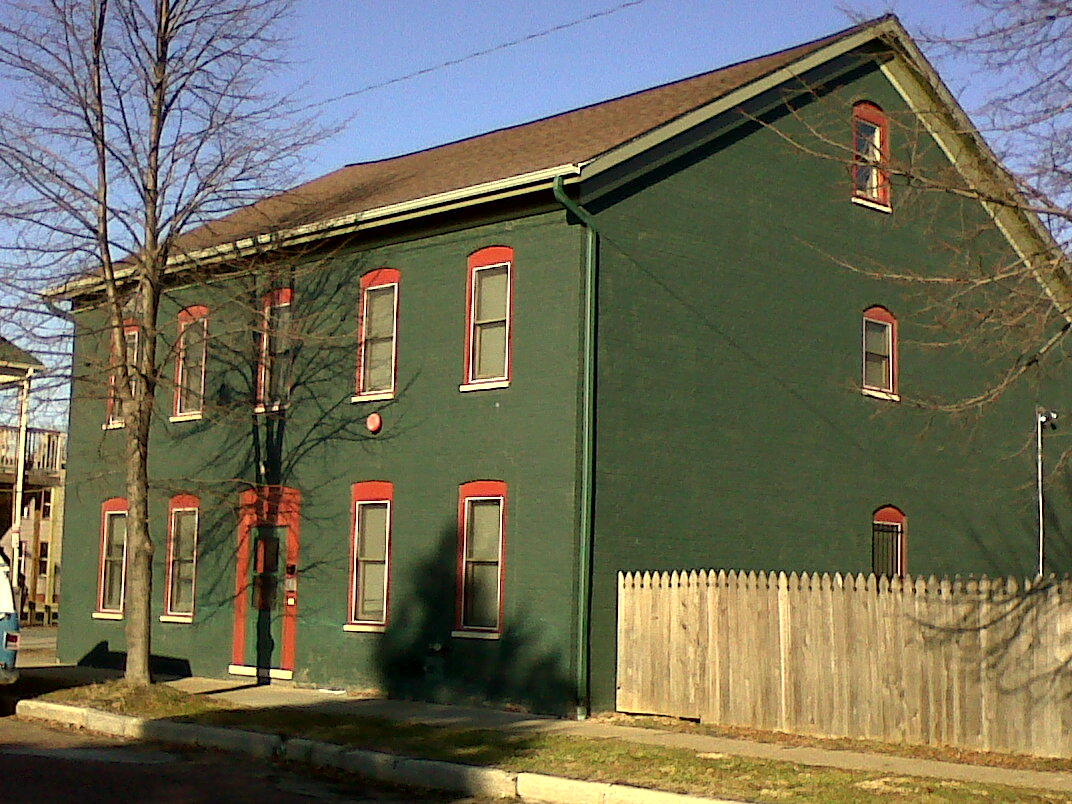

- Location within Iowa Location within the United States
- Location: 1130 W. 5th St. Davenport, Iowa
- Coordinates: 41°31′30″N 90°35′20″W
- Area: less than one acre
- Built: 1860
- Architectural style: Greek Revival
- MPS: Davenport MRA
- NRHP reference No.: 83002444
- Added to NRHP: July 7, 1983

The Bonaventura Heinz House is a historic building located in the West End of Davenport, Iowa, United States. It has been listed on the National Register of Historic Places (NRHP) since 1983. Another house was also attributed to him, Bonaventura Heinz House (first), which was also listed on the NRHP in 1983. It was delisted in 2005.

== Bonaventura Heinz ==
Bonaventura Heinz was born in Baden, present day Germany, and immigrated to the United States in 1845. He settled in St. Louis, Missouri before enlisting in the United States Army to fight in the war with Mexico. He returned to St. Louis where he married Margueretta Trenkenshuh. They eventually moved to Davenport, where they raised four children. He became the wharf manager and was connected to river transportation. He also took an active role in public affairs in Davenport. He died in 1899 at the age of 72.
