= Bonaventura (surname) =

Bonaventura is a surname. Notable people with the surname include:

- Andrea Giacinto Bonaventura Longhin OFMCap (1863–1936), Italian Capuchin and bishop
- Emilio Bonaventura Altieri (1590–1676), Italian noble and future Pope Clement X
- Braniff Bonaventure (born 1973), American football player
- Federico Bonaventura (1555–1602), Italian statesman and natural philosopher
- Giacomo Bonaventura (born 1989), Italian football player
- Lorenzo di Bonaventura (born 1957), American film producer
- Pietro Bonaventura (died 1653), Roman Catholic bishop
- Romano Bonaventura (1216–1243), Cardinal deacon of Sant'Angelo in Pescheria and cardinal-legate to the court of France
- Segna di Bonaventura, Italian painter

== See also ==
- Bonaventura (disambiguation)
