= San Buenaventura District, Canta =

Coordinates: 11.4893°S 76.6620°W

San Buenaventura District
- District
- Interactive map of San Buenaventura District
- Country: Peru
- Region: Lima
- Province: Canta
- Capital: San Buenaventura

Government
  - Mayor: David Ysmael Vento Ramos (2019-2022)

Area
  - Total: 106.26 km^{2} (41.03 sq mi)
- Elevation: 2,702 m (8,865 ft)

Population (2017)
  - Total: 555
  - Density: 5.22/km^{2} (13.5/sq mi)
- Time zone: UTC-5 (PET)
- UBIGEO: 150406

San Buenaventura District is one of seven districts of the province Canta in Peru.

== See also ==
- Ch'akiqucha
