= Canta province =

Province of Peru

Coordinates: 11°28′S 76°37′W

Canta
- Province
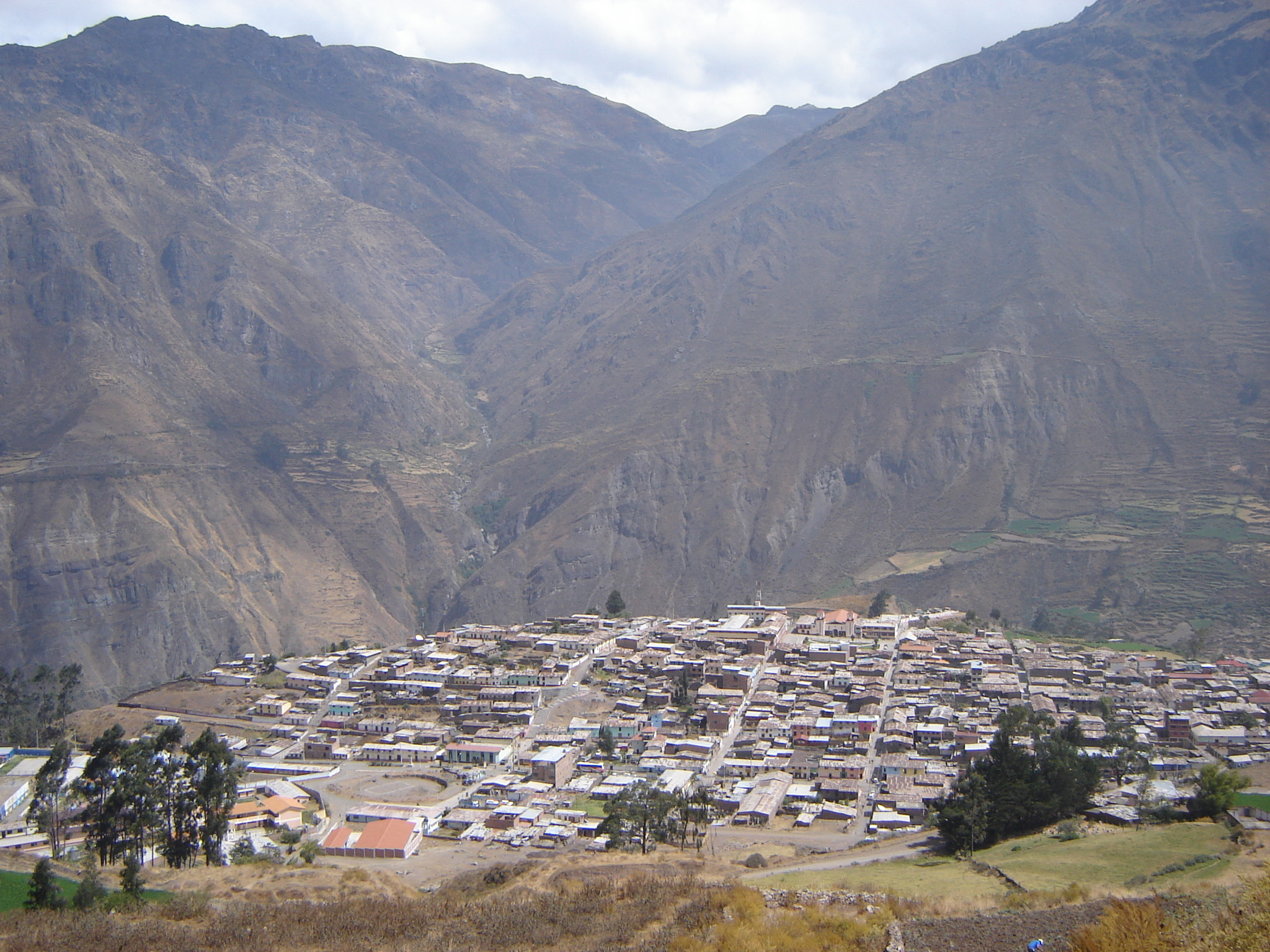
- The town of Canta

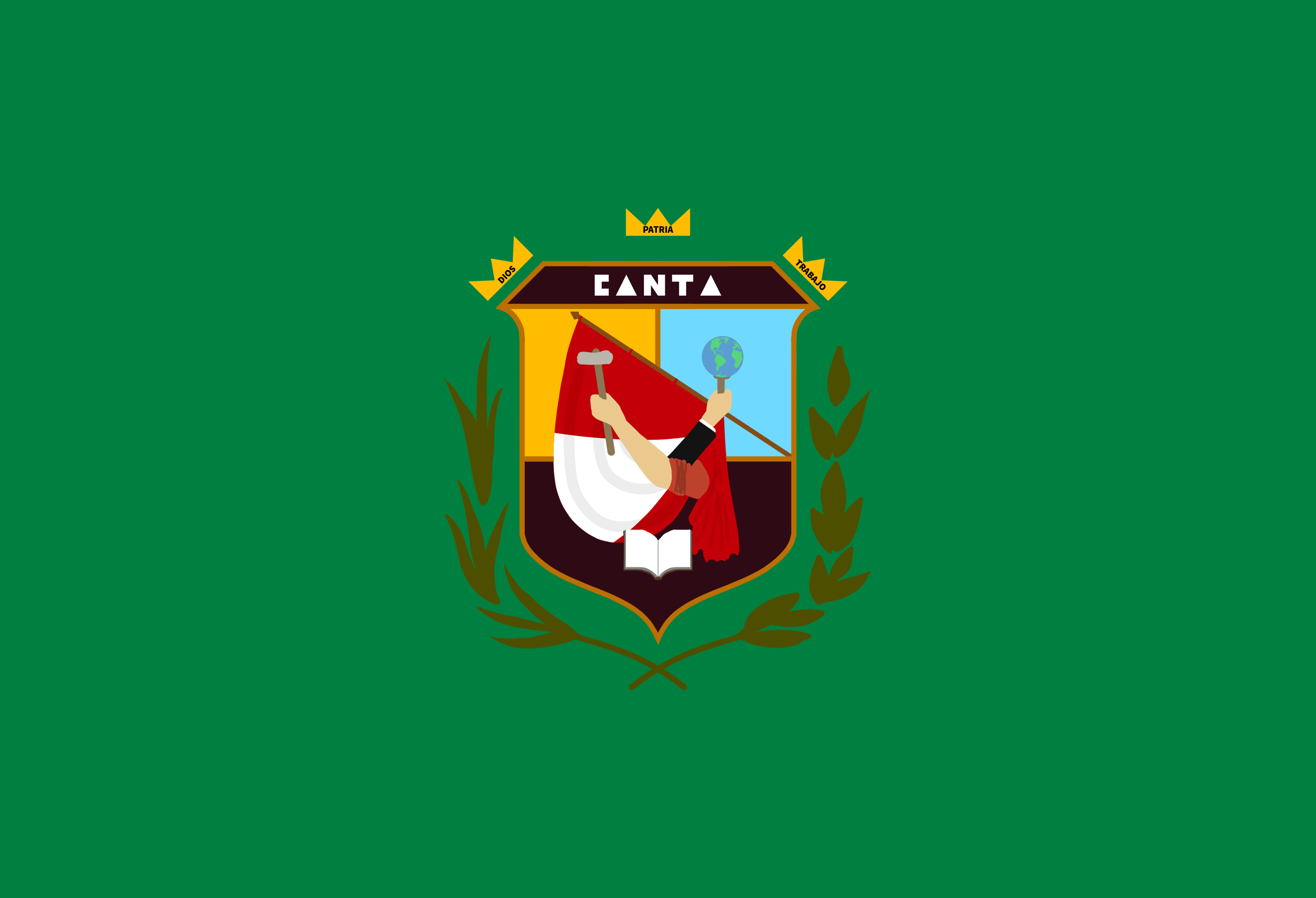
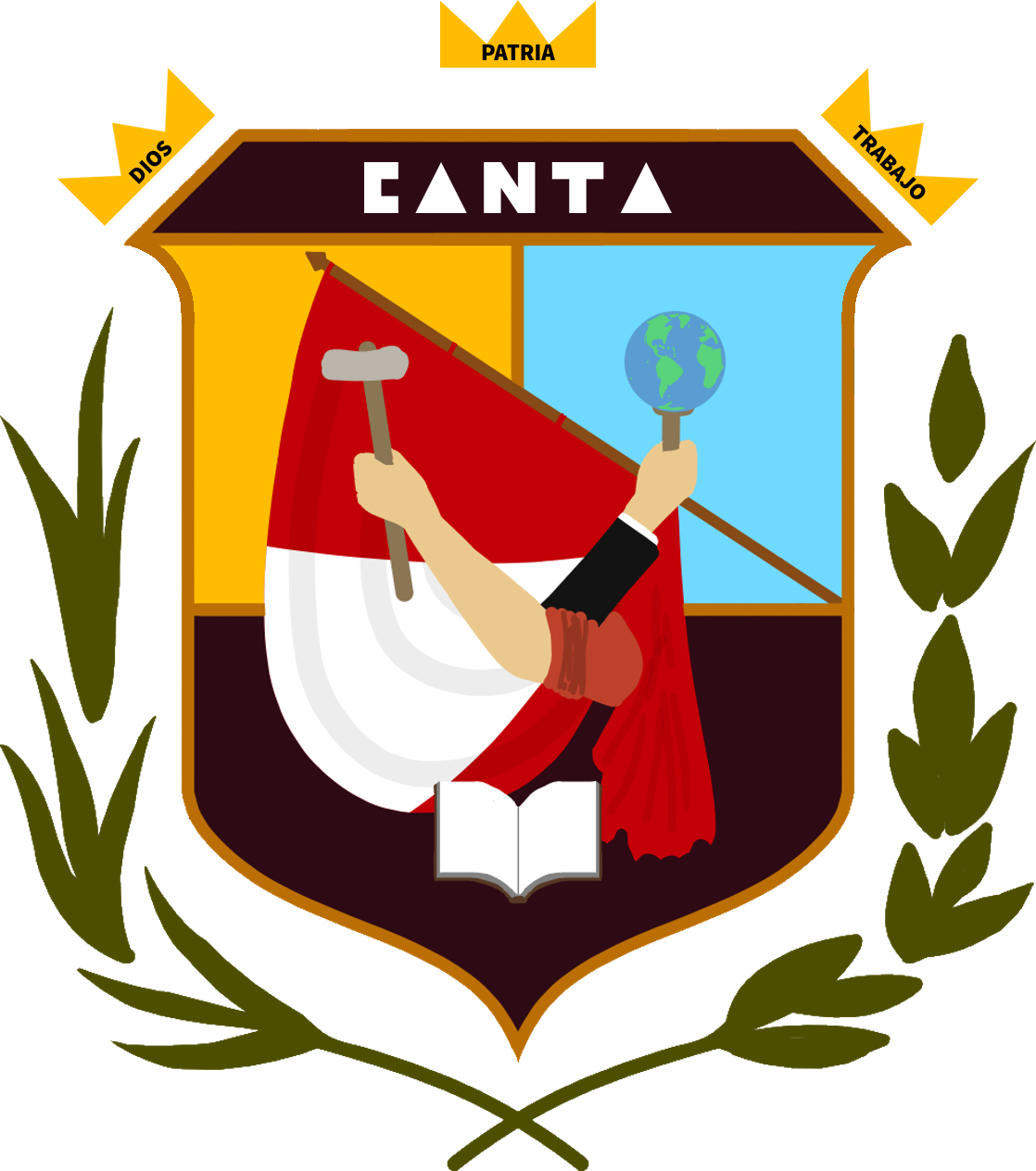
- Flag Coat of arms

- Location of Canta in Lima
- Country: Peru
- Department: Lima
- Capital: Canta

Government
  - Mayor: Arturo Óscar Paredes Salcedo (2019-2022)

Area
  - Total: 1,687.29 km^{2} (651.47 sq mi)
- Elevation: 2,819 m (9,249 ft)

Population
  - Total: 11,548
  - Density: 6.8441/km^{2} (17.726/sq mi)
- UBIGEO: 1504

Canta is a province of the department of Lima, Peru. From the administrative point of view of the Catholic Church in Peru, it forms part of the Diocese of Huacho. It is located approximately 105 kilometres (65 mi) to the northeast of the capital, Lima.

== Geography ==
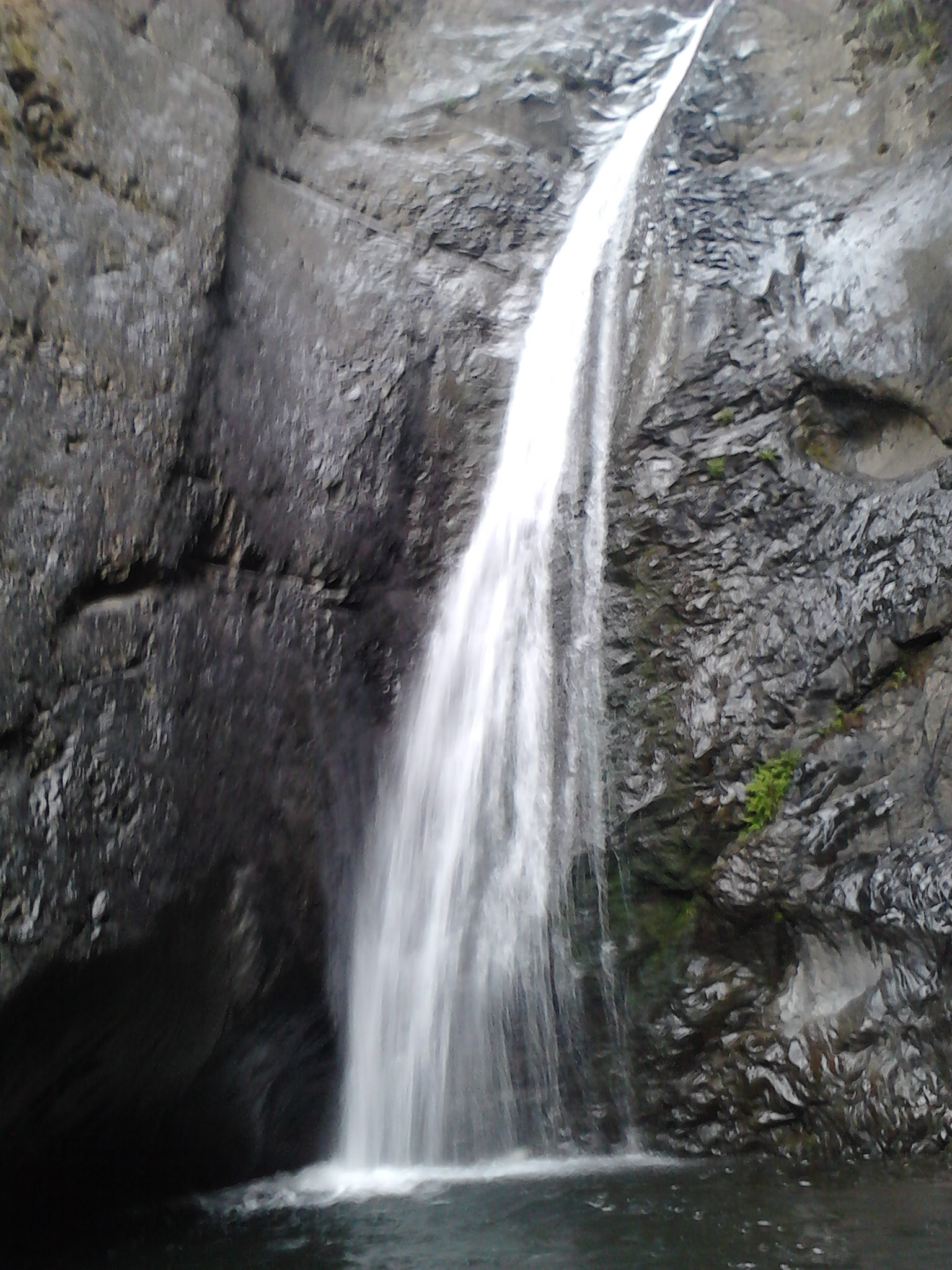
Velo de novia, Canta

One of the highest peaks of the province is Chunta at 5,208 m (17,087 ft). Other mountains are listed below:

- Anta Mantay
- Anta Phiruru
- Aqu Mach'ay
- Awkichani
- Chakra Kancha
- Chakra Mit'u
- Ch'akiqucha
- Luk'ana
- Misk'i Pukyu
- Parqa Rumi
- Pistaq Mach'ay
- Pukara
- Qullpa P'iti
- Raqray
- Saywa
- Silla Rumi
- Tarapu
- Tunshu Marka
- Tuqtu Pallanka
- Waqutu
- Wayllas
- Wira Qaqa
- Yana Markan
- Yana Punta
- Yanama

== Political division ==
The province is divided into seven districts.

- Arahuay (Arahuay)
- Canta (Canta)
- Huamantanga (Huamantanga)
- Huaros (Huaros)
- Lachaqui (Lachaqui)
- San Buenaventura (San Buenaventura)
- Santa Rosa de Quives (Yangas)
