= Buenaventura River =

Imagined river in western North America

The non-existent Buenaventura River, alternatively San Buenaventura River or Río Buenaventura, was once speculated as running from the Rocky Mountains to the Pacific Ocean through the Great Basin region of what is now the western United States. The river was chronologically the last of several imagined incarnations of an imagined Great River of the West which would be for North America west of the Rockies what the Mississippi River was east of the Rockies. The hopes were to find a water route most of the way from coast to coast, sparing the long voyage around Cape Horn at the tip of South America.

== Domínguez, Vélez de Escalante and Miera ==
In 1776, two Franciscan missionaries Atanasio Domínguez and Silvestre Vélez de Escalante sought to find a land route between Santa Fe in Nuevo México to Monterey in Alta California. (Note: Both of these territories were then provinces of Viceroyalty of New Spain.) They were part of what has become known as the Domínguez–Escalante expedition, a ten-man expedition including Bernardo de Miera y Pacheco (Miera) acting as the cartographer. (Note: They were joined en route by two Native American guides.) On September 13, they encountered what is now called the Green River in modern day Utah, a southward-flowing tributary of the Colorado and named it San Buenaventura after the catholic saint Bonaventure.

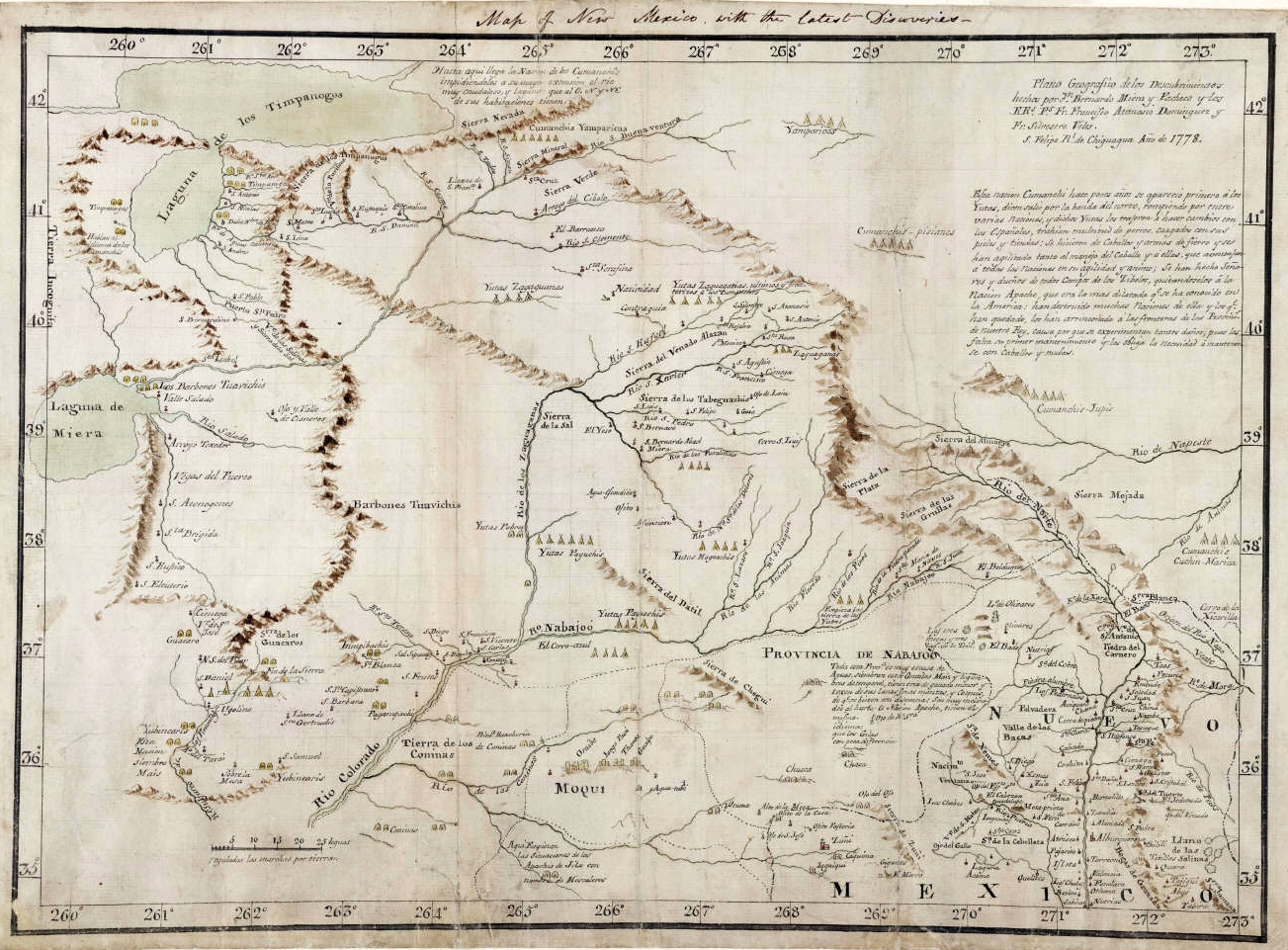
Map by Barnardo de Miera, 1778, depicting the Buenaventura River as a faulty combination of Green River and Sevier River. The depiction of "Lake Timpanogos" with a narrow strait in the middle is probably a misunderstanding of the indigenes' description of the large lake to the north (the Great Salt Lake) as directly connected to Utah Lake rather than connected by the 50 mile long Jordan River. "Laguna de Miera" is the Sevier Lake, again drawn from descriptions by the indigenes.

At that point in time, there was nothing mythical about the Buenaventura River. Dominguez and Vélez de Escalante's journal correctly notes that above their crossing, the river flowed toward the west. It flowed generally southwest where they crossed it and continued southwest as they traveled in its vicinity. Escalante also correctly recorded that after its junction with the Rio San Clemente (today's White River?—which he also named) the Buenaventura River turned to the south. So, the original Buenaventura River is real and exists today under a different name.

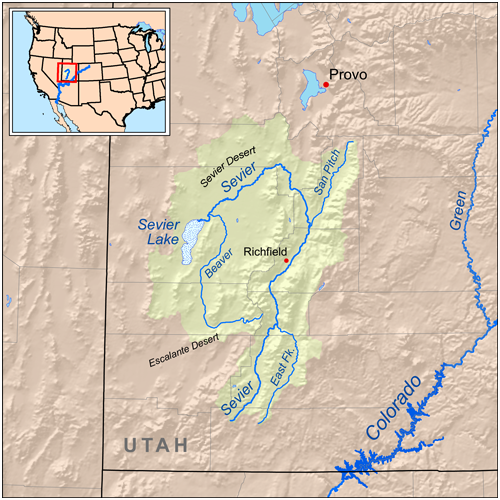
Map of the Watershed of the Sevier and Beaver Rivers, showing the Sevier's correct placement relative to the Green River. The lake to the north, just west of the city of Provo, is Utah Lake. The south tip of the Great Salt Lake can be seen at the top of the map.

After establishing contact with a branch of the Ute (Yutahs) Tribe on the south shore of what they called Lake Timpanogos (various spellings), now called "Utah Lake", the expedition turned south-southwest. On September 29, they were surprised to come upon a river (the Sevier River) flowing from the south-southeast, and turned toward the west at the point where they encountered it. Dominguez and Vélez de Escalante noted in their journal that the Native American name for this river suggested it was the same river they had named Buenaventura. They expressed doubts it was the same river because had it been so, it was substantially smaller downstream than it had been upstream—the opposite of the normal pattern. They named this river the Rio San Ysabel. The Native Americans told them it flowed west from there into a lake (Sevier Lake) and beyond. The Sevier Lake has no outlet, so the indigenes may have been referring to the west-flowing Humboldt River, which originates over 150 miles northwest, and were misinterpreted by the explorers.

Despite Dominguez and Vélez de Escalante's doubts that the Green and Sevier Rivers were one and the same, the maps Miera produced do not include the Rio San Ysabel and depict the Buenaventura flowing southwest from where they encountered it in northeastern Utah, to the Sevier Lake (Note: Why Meira disregarded the evidence the two rivers were not the same is a mystery. He was often ill and suffered terribly in the cold returning to Santa Fe, and that may have affected his memory, causing him to disagree with the padres' journal.) in west-central Utah. (Note: The lake is called "Lago Salado de Teguayo" ("Teguayo" itself being a legendary region thought to exist in the general area the expedition was exploring.) in the case of a 1777 map attributed to "Antonio Vélez y Escalante" and bears Miera's name, in the case of the versions attributed to him, of which there are several in various collections.) In an accompanying note to king Charles III of Spain, Miera recommended building several missions in the area and mentioned the possibility of a water way to the Pacific Ocean, via the Buenaventura or the Timpanogos River: the river Miera depicts on his map as flowing west from the Great Salt Lake (GSL). Although Miera documented a correct description of the GSL given to them by the indigenes the Spanish assumed that what they thought had been described was incorrect and interpreted their description of the "extremely salty" lake as the ocean and assumed that the description of the river flowing from "Lake Timpanogos", which is the Jordan River flowing between Utah Lake and the Great Salt Lake, was of a waterway to the Pacific.

The error of depicting the Buenaventura as flowing southwest to a lake was perpetuated by early explorers and cartographers such as Alexander von Humboldt, who used a map from the Dominguez and Escalanté expedition to prepare his maps in 1804 and 1809. Zebulon Pike used Humboldt's maps to prepare his map for his book from 1810. Aaron Arrowsmith in 1814 published a map depicting the Buenaventura flowing to "Lac Sale". These cartographers conservatively did not try to chart the area west of that explored by Dominguez and Escalante.

== Timpanogos and Los Mongos rivers ==
Beginning in 1819, maps began showing two rivers that arose from the Great Salt Lake and Sevier Lake. The northerly one was that which connected Miera's outlet from the Great Salt Lake to the Sacramento River and was referred to as the "Timpanogos River". In 1822, Henry Tanner posited another outlet from the Great Salt Lake, the "Los Mongos" River that was the source of the Rogue River (Oregon). In 1825, Jedediah Smith, explored areas the north of the GSL, but did not find the Los Mongos. He sent more men to float around the shoreline to the west and south, and they were unsuccessful in finding "R. Timpanogos". However, this information was delayed in reaching cartographers, and in 1836 Tanner repeated the depictions of the three rivers, except he identified the "R. Timpanogos" as "R. S. Sacramento ou (or) Timpanogos". So, when, in 1841, John Bidwell embarked over the Rocky Mountains to California, he was advised to take carpenters tools with them, to build canoes and sail from the GSL to the Pacific.

== Extending the Buenaventura West to the Pacific ==
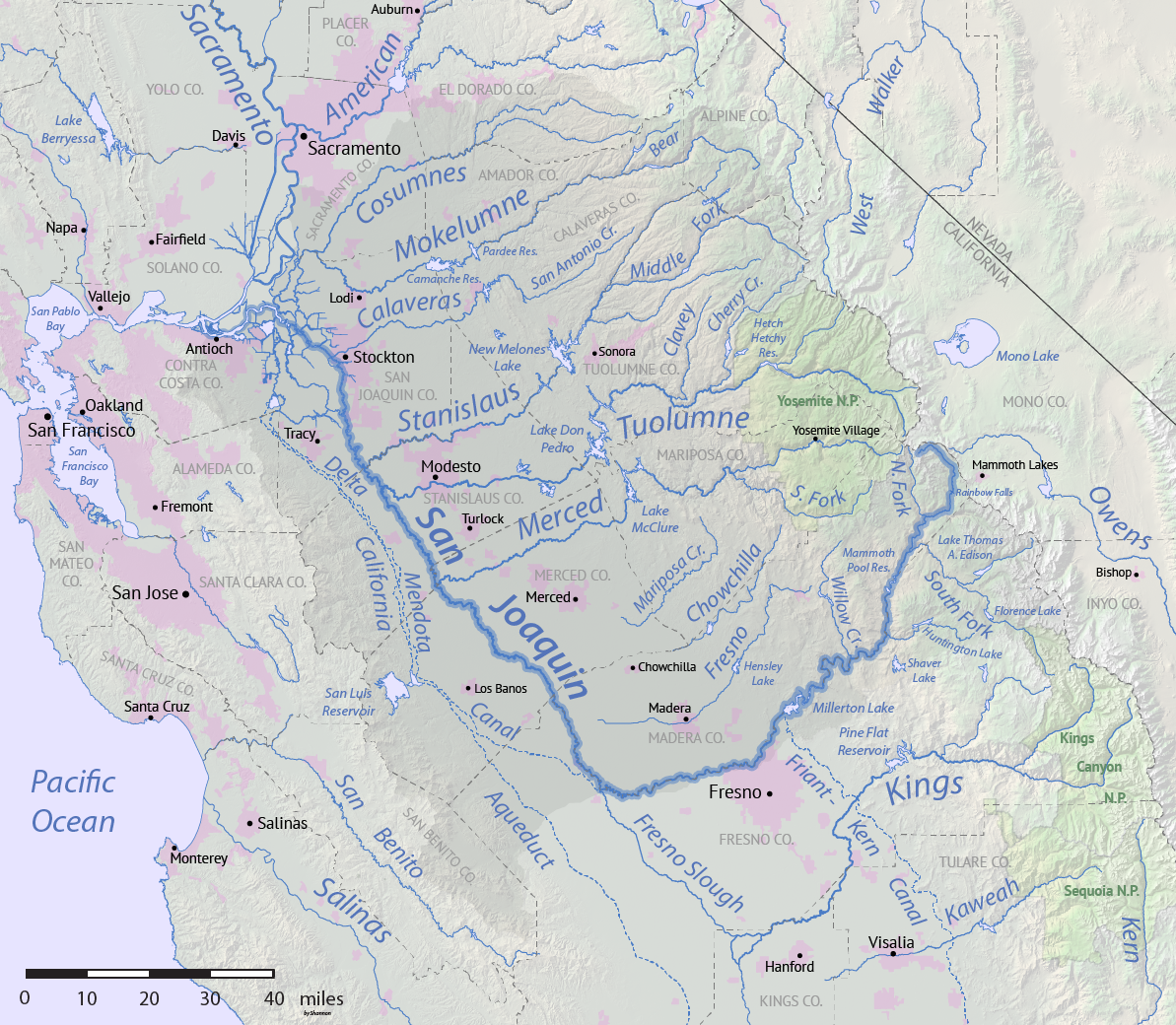
Watershed map of the San Joaquin River, depicting its head in the Sierra Nevada

There had long been a hope that a river flowing west from the Rocky Mountains to the Pacific Ocean would provide an easy route for travel and trade. This dream was the descendant of the long sought Northwest Passage. (Note: A map by Robert Sayer (1750?) shows the Great River of the West flowing from Lake Winnipeg) When Francisco Garcés drew his maps of Alta California, he did not understand the nature of the Sierra Nevada, and he drew the "San Felipe" or San Joaquin River originating beyond the Sierras in the Great Basin and flowing to the Pacific Ocean, in or near San Francisco Bay. Then, when Manuel Augustin Mascaro and Miguel Constanso made the first map of the whole Viceroyalty of New Spain (1784), they extended the "San Felipe" almost to the Sevier Lake. A similar map was published in 1820 by Sidney E. Morse showing the Rio de San Buenaventura flowing into a lake, the western limits of which are unknown. This map shows the "Supposed river between the Buenaventura and the Bay of Francisco, which will probably be the communication between the Atlantic and the Pacific" toward this lake, but quite not connecting with it. (Note: By 1828, however, Morse was leaving the "supposed river" off his map.) A map by J. Finlayson (1822) shows a Rio de S. Buenaventura originating near the "Principle [sic] source of the Rio Colorado" and emptying into a salt lake the western limits of which "are unknown". This same map indicates that an uncharted Rio de San Filipe crosses a range of mountains at 122 degrees west longitude.

Other cartographers began to boldly assert that rivers flowed from Lake Timpanogos and "Lac Salado" to the Pacific Ocean. Henry S. Tanner's influential map of 1822 shows the Buenaventura River flowing from the north central Rockies through the Sevier Lake to the Pacific Ocean south of Monterey Bay. This map also shows two rivers flowing from Lake Timpanogos, (Utah Lake) one to San Francisco Bay (the R. Timpanogos), the other to Port Orford, Oregon (the Los Mongos R.) where the Rogue River enters the Pacific. A similar map by Anthony Finley was published in 1826 (Note: By 1830, Finley had dropped the two northern rivers and just depicted the Buenaventura flowing from the "Salt Lake" (Sevier Lake)) A map by Thomas Bradford (1835) shows a river flowing to San Francisco Bay (labeled as "Port Sir Francis Drake" in a region Bradford called "New Albion") from the south end of Lake Timpanogos. There is no reference to Rio de San Buenaventura. An 1844 map by James Bowden shows a landlocked Buenaventura wrapping around the southeast side of a "doubtful" Lake Timpanogos.

== Explorations in the region where the Buenaventura might have been located ==
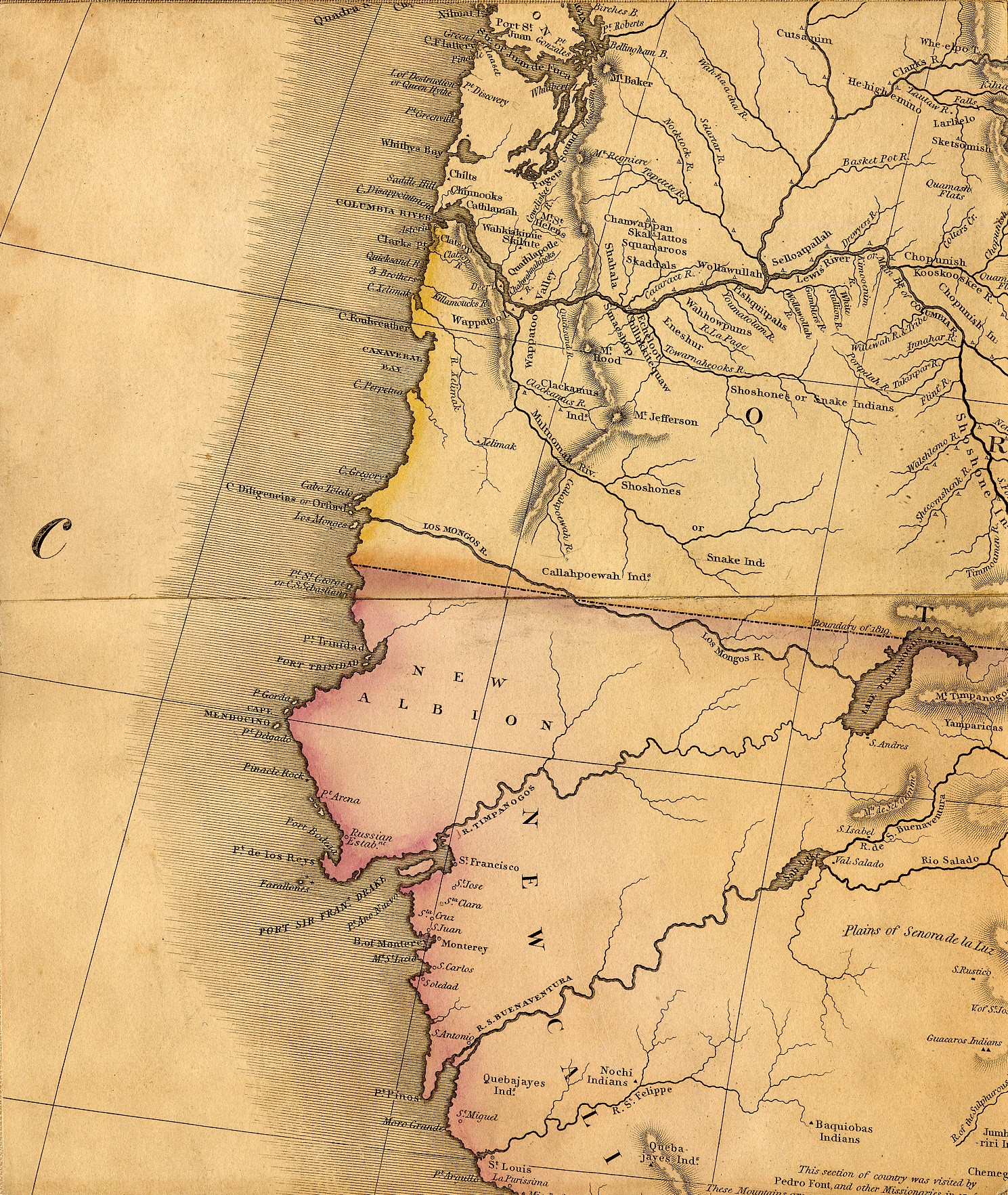
Tanner, Henry Schnek (1822). "Map of North America". University of Tulsa, McFarling Library Department of Special Collections and University Archives. Archived from the original on March 9, 2016. Section depicting the Pacific Coast with fictive Rivers from the Wasatch Range to the Pacific Ocean.

The Great Salt Lake (GSL) was first seen and reported as very saline by white North Americans in 1824, apparently independently by Jim Bridger and Etienne Provost. Upon learning of the GSL, explorers began equating Lake Timpanogos on the maps with it and, apparently unaware of the fact that saline lakes such as the Great Salt and Sevier Lakes have no outlets, began efforts to find the rivers flowing from them west to the Pacific as promised by maps such as Tanner's.

In 1825, William H. Ashley attempted to float the Green (Buenaventura) River to either what was called "Salt Lake" (actually Sevier Lake) on Tanner's map, or the Colorado River, to which the fur traders suspected it flowed. He started in present-day Wyoming, and after passing through the treacherous Gates of Lodore, aborted the trip prior to entering Desolation Canyon. Despite not having gotten close to the Colorado River, he concluded that the Green did empty into it, and continued his exploration by engaging Provost to lead him on an overland excursion to observe the GSL.

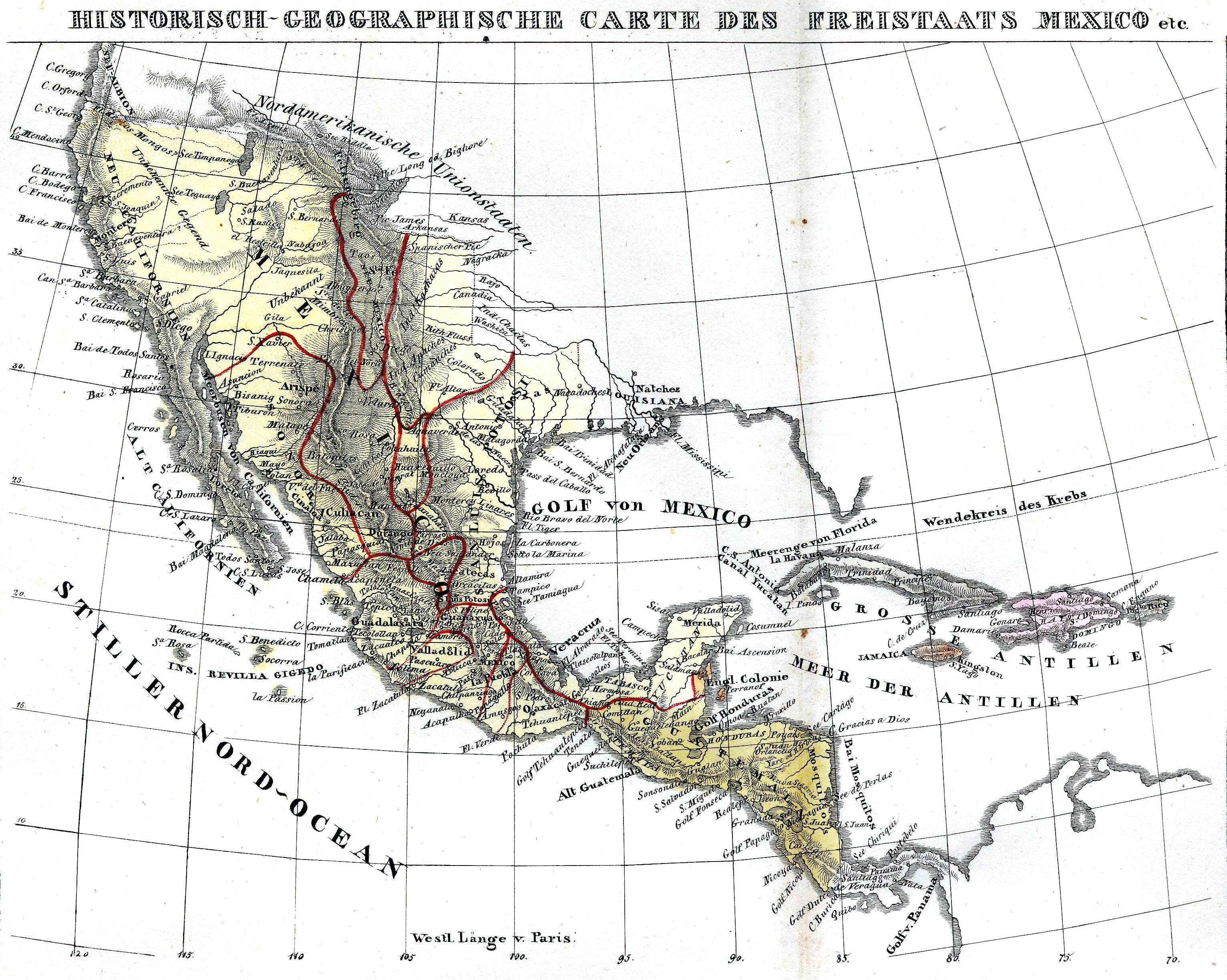
A German map from 1829, very similar to the Tanner maps, showing the Buenaventura River running from Sierra Verde (part of the Rocky Mountains) though the Sevier lake (Teguayo). The route between the Sevier Lake and the Pacific Ocean is represented as uncertain.

When Ashley retired from the fur trade his company was bought out by Smith and two partners, David Jackson and William Sublette. In 1826, Smith led an expedition south from southern Idaho, and upon reaching the mouth of the Jordan River on the southeast end of the GSL, traveled south along to the east side of Utah Lake. Since he identified the Jordan River as the outlet of Utah Lake, he did not explore the lake further. He encountered the Sevier River on its northeast-flowing stretch, and assuming it continued to flow north to Utah Lake, dismissed it as the possible Buenaventura and continued southwest to Southern California. In 1827 and 1828 he tracked the western flank of the Sierra Nevada in its full length, without registering a river that passed through the range, but he heard the Sacramento River referenced as the "Buenaventura" by Luis Antonio Argüello.

In the spring of 1827, Daniel Potts, a fur trader in the employ of Smith, encountered the Sevier River downstream from the point Smith had the previous summer. He continued to follow the river downstream to the Sevier Lake, which he confirmed was a saline lake, but did not try to circumvent it to find an outlet. He instead followed the entire course of the river upstream to its head. (Note: Although Potts was presumably at the 1827 rendezvous, with Smith, Smith was unaware of Potts' findings that the Sevier did not flow to Utah Lake when he wrote to William Clark on July 12, 1827, the day before he left to return to California.)

In 1836 the noted statesman and ethnographer Albert Gallatin published a map depicting the Sierra Nevada as a solid barrier and the Great Basin as a "Great Sandy Desert", with Smith's 1827 crossing indicated. In 1839 David H. Burr, cartographer of the U.S. House of Representatives, published a map, also based on Jedediah Smith's accounts, showing the Great Basin labeled the "Great Sandy Plain", and the Sierra Nevada as a solid barrier.

In 1833-34, mountain man Joseph R. Walker, a member of the trapping and exploring party headed by Benjamin L. E. Bonneville, led a group west from the Great Salt Lake. They went down the Humboldt River to its sink, then down the east side of the Sierra Nevada, crossing the mountains near Yosemite Valley. After wintering at San Juan Bautista, they went south to what became known as Walker Pass, then went north along the east side of the Sierra, and up the Humboldt River to meet up with Bonneville. They thus knew that no river ran west from the Rockies to San Francisco Bay. A member of Walker's party, Zenas Leonard, published a detailed account of the journey, and stated clearly: "The Calafornia [sic] mountain extends from the Columbia to the Colorado river, running parallel with the coast about 150 miles distant, and 12 or 15 hundred miles in length with its peaks perpetually covered with eternal snows. There is a large number of water courses descending from this mountain on either side—those on the east side stretching out into the plain, and those on the west flow generally in a straight course until they empty into the Pacific; but in no place is there a water course through the mountain." The famous writer Washington Irving wrote a widely circulated book detailing the Bonneville and Walker explorations, in which he described Upper California as extending from the Pacific Ocean "to the great chain of snow-capped mountains which divide it from the sand plains of the interior." The map included in Irving's book, based on Walker's description, showed the Sierra Nevada as a solid barrier.

John C. Frémont, in the report of his 1843–44 expedition along the Oregon Trail to Fort Vancouver then south along the east side of the Sierra Nevada, crossing the Sierra over what became known as Carson Pass to Sutter's Fort, claimed to be searching for the Buenaventura River. That claim is contradicted, however, by his description of the Great Basin as having no outlet to any ocean, prior to any mention of the Buenaventura River. Also, Frémont was well aware of the explorations of Smith and Walker, and the resulting maps. Apparently, Frémont and his wife Jessie Benton Frémont (daughter of pro-expansionist Senator Thomas Hart Benton) inserted references to a supposed search for the mythical river into the report after the expedition was completed.
