= Huamantanga District =

Coordinates: 11.4989°S 76.7491°W

Huamantanga Waman Tanka
- District
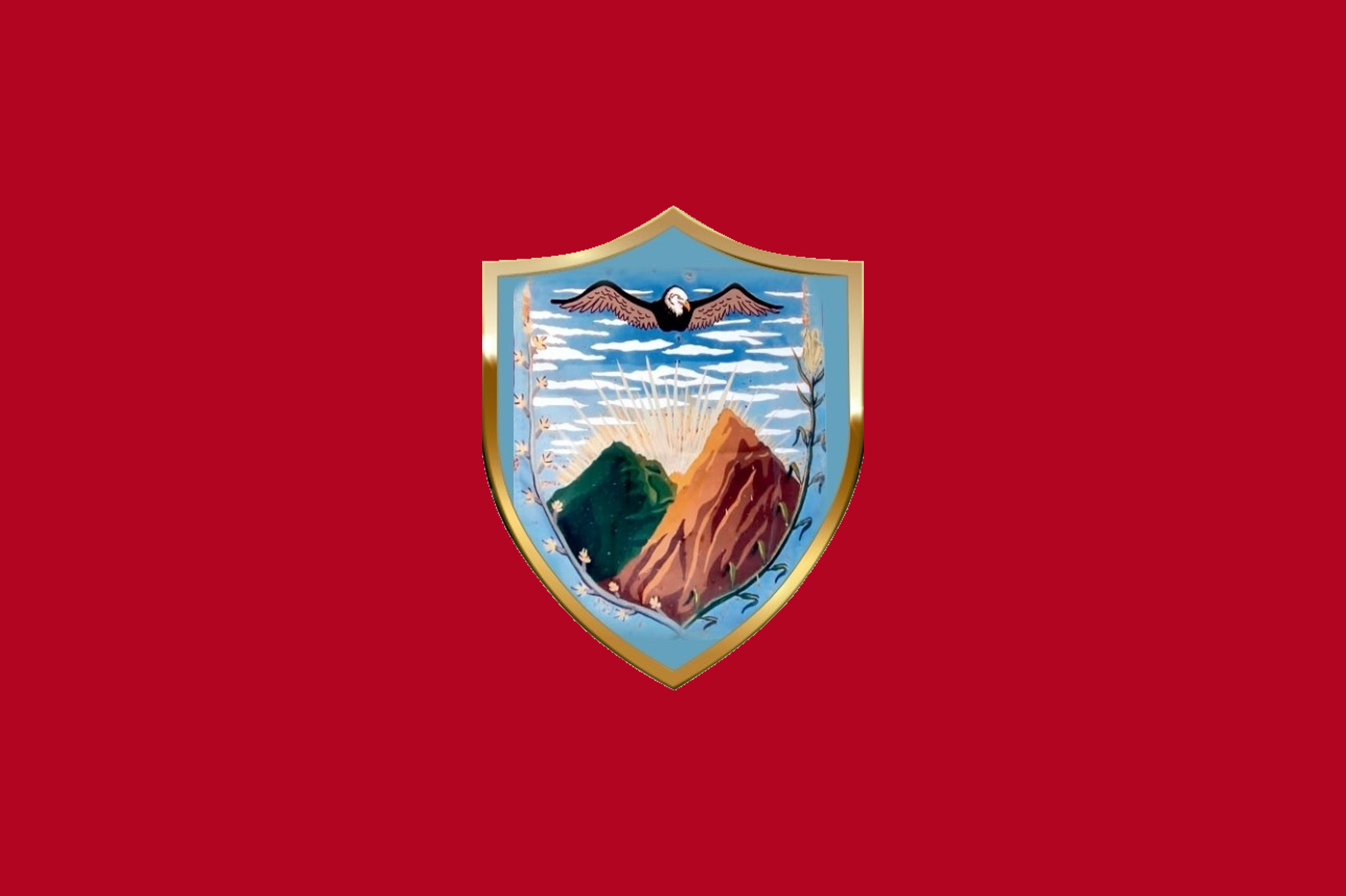
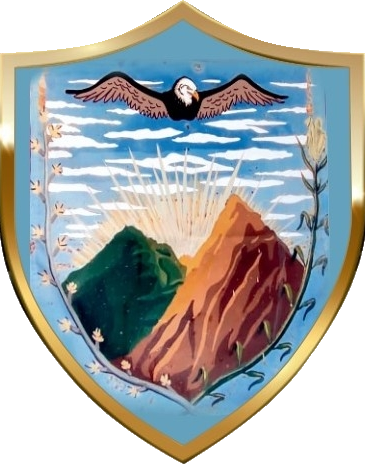
- Flag Coat of arms
- Interactive map of Huamantanga
- Country: Peru
- Region: Lima
- Province: Canta
- Capital: Huamantanga

Government
  - Mayor: Javier Cataño Flores

Area
  - Total: 487.93 km^{2} (188.39 sq mi)
- Elevation: 3,392 m (11,129 ft)

Population (2017)
  - Total: 686
  - Density: 1.41/km^{2} (3.64/sq mi)
- Time zone: UTC-5 (PET)
- UBIGEO: 150403

Huamantanga (from Quechua Waman Tanka, meaning "falcon bifurcation") is one of seven districts of the Canta Province in Peru.

== Geography ==
One of the highest mountains of the district is Tuntuman at approximately 4,600 m (15,100 ft). Other mountains are listed below:

- Awki Pampa
- Chuqi P'itaq
- K'uchu Qucha
- Mina Hirka
- Pakay Marka
- Pampa Kancha
- Parqa Rumi
- Pirwa Rumi
- Ruphay Pampa
- Tuqtu Pallanka
- Tunshu Marka
- Wankaray
- Wintu
- Yana Punta
