= HMS Bonaventure =

Eight ships of the Royal Navy have borne the name HMS Bonaventure, and another was planned:

- English ship Bonaventure (1489) was a warship built in 1489, and gone by 1509.
- English ship Bonaventure (1551), also known as Edward Bonaventure, was a ship built in 1551 and wrecked in 1556.
- English ship Bonaventure (1567), also known as Elizabeth Bonaventure, was a 47-gun ship purchased in 1567 and in service in 1599.
- English ship Bonaventure (1621) was a 32-gun ship launched in 1621 and lost in action in 1653.
- HMS Bonaventure (1660) was a 42-gun ship, launched in 1650 as President. She was renamed HMS Bonaventure in 1660, was rebuilt in 1666 and broken up for a rebuild in 1711. She was relaunched in 1711 as a 50-gun fourth rate. She was renamed HMS Argyll in 1715, was rebuilt in 1722 and was sunk as a breakwater in 1748.
- HMS Bonaventure (1892) was an Astraea-class second-class cruiser launched in 1892. She was a used as a submarine depot ship from 1910 and was broken up in 1920.
- HMS Bonaventure (31) was a Dido-class light cruiser launched in 1939 and sunk in 1941.
- HMS Bonaventure (F139) was an ‘X’ craft midget submarine depot ship launched in 1942 and sold in 1948.

== See also ==
- HMCS Bonaventure was a Majestic-class aircraft carrier, launched in 1945 as HMS Powerful, but not completed. She was sold to the Royal Canadian Navy in 1952 and renamed HMCS Bonaventure. She was broken up in 1971.

== Battle honours ==
- Lowestoft 1665
- Four Days Battle 1666
- Orfordness 1666
- Solebay 1672
- Schooneveld 1673
- Texel 1673
- Beachy Head 1690
- Barfleur 1692
- China 1900
- Malta Convoys 1941–42
