= Canta =

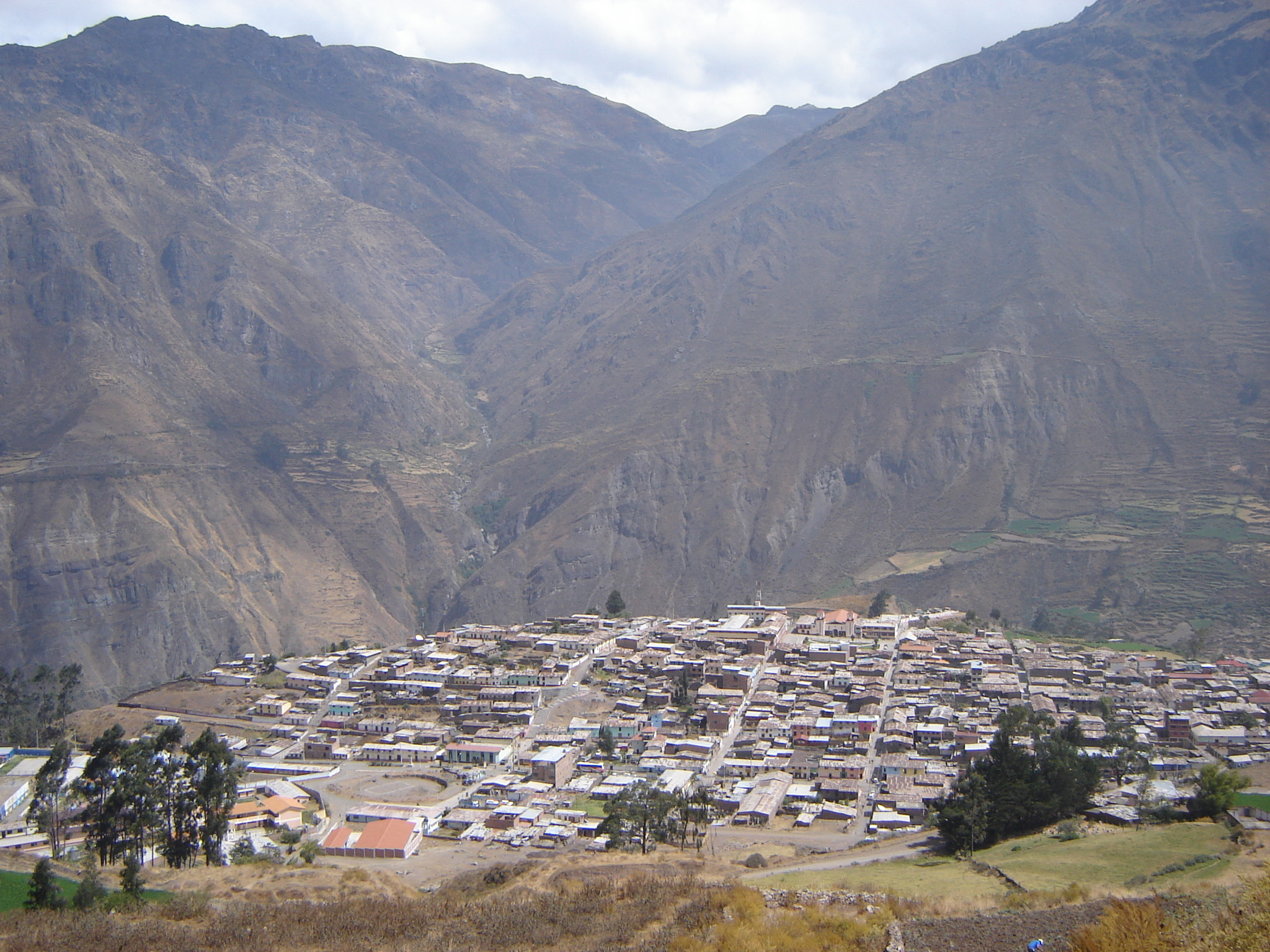
- View of the town of Canta

- Location in Peru
- Coordinates: 11°28′1.2″S 76°37′26.4″W
- Country: Peru
- Region: Lima
- Province: Canta
- District: Canta

Government
  - Mayor: Arturo Paredes Salcedo (2019-2022)
- Elevation: 2,819 m (9,249 ft)

Population (2017)
  - Total: 2,385
- Demonym: Canteño/a
- Time zone: UTC−5 (PET)

Canta is a town in the Lima Region, in western Peru. The town is located on the Chillón River and is the capital of the Canta Province. With a population of 2,385 (2017 census), it is also the capital of Canta District. It is frequently visited by tourists from Lima because of its quietness and the beauty of its natural landscapes. The town's altitude is 2,819 m above sea level.

== Etymology ==
The word canta comes from the Cauqui language spoken by the ancient inhabitants and their meaning can be indicated with these two meanings:

- canta = tie to catch vicunas
- canta = hillside, decline

== Geography ==
The town is 103 kilometres (64 mi) from Lima, about a three-hour bus ride, and is often visited by geography students from the Pontificia Universidad Catolica del Peru. The small town of Obrajillo is nearby.

Aerial photo of Canta, Peru

Aerial photo of Canta, Peru

=== Climate ===
Canta has a dry subtropical highland climate, characterized by the Köppen climate classification as a semi-arid climate (BSk).

Canta experiences relatively stable temperatures throughout the year, with minor variations between months. The yearly average high temperature is 18.0°C (64.4°F), while the yearly average low temperature is 8.0°C (46.4°F).

The total annual precipitation is 376.4 millimeters (14.82 inches). Canta receives the majority of its precipitation during the wet season, which typically spans from January to March. The months from May to September typically receive very little rainfall.

Climate data for Canta (1991–2020)
Month	Jan	Feb	Mar	Apr	May	Jun	Jul	Aug	Sep	Oct	Nov	Dec	Year
Mean daily maximum °C (°F)	17.2 (63.0)	16.8 (62.2)	16.9 (62.4)	17.7 (63.9)	18.5 (65.3)	18.5 (65.3)	18.5 (65.3)	18.9 (66.0)	18.9 (66.0)	18.5 (65.3)	18.1 (64.6)	17.5 (63.5)	18.0 (64.4)
Mean daily minimum °C (°F)	8.1 (46.6)	8.2 (46.8)	8.3 (46.9)	8.3 (46.9)	7.9 (46.2)	7.6 (45.7)	7.5 (45.5)	7.9 (46.2)	8.1 (46.6)	8.2 (46.8)	8.0 (46.4)	8.3 (46.9)	8.0 (46.4)
Average precipitation mm (inches)	71.1 (2.80)	93.4 (3.68)	96.8 (3.81)	30.3 (1.19)	2.2 (0.09)	0.5 (0.02)	0.0 (0.0)	0.8 (0.03)	3.7 (0.15)	11.3 (0.44)	18.3 (0.72)	48.0 (1.89)	376.4 (14.82)
Source: NOAA

== History ==
At some time in the 16th century, it was dominated by the Inca Pachacutec during his path to the north. The Spanish conquistadors found Canta in a prosperous locality. It was given like a parcel to don Nicolás de Ribera. During the War of Independence from the Spanish Crown, the people of Canta gave strong support to the cause of liberation.
