= P'itiqucha =

P'itiqucha (Quechua p'iti dividing by pulling powerfully to the extremes; gap, interruption, qucha lake, "gap lake", hispanicized names Lago Piti, Laguna Piti, Peticocha, Piticocha) may refer to:

- P'itiqucha (Ancash), a lake in the Ancash Region, Peru
- P'itiqucha (Huanza), a lake in the Huanza District, Huarochirí Province, Lima Region, Peru
- P'itiqucha (Quinti), a lake in the Quinti District, Huarochirí Province, Lima Region, Peru
