= San Antonio District, Huarochirí =

Coordinates: 11.7434°S 76.6499°W

San Antonio District Chaqlla
- District
- Interactive map of San Antonio District
- Country: Peru
- Region: Lima
- Province: Huarochirí
- Founded: January 5, 1945
- Capital: Chaclla

Government
  - Mayor: Nick Aponte (2023 - 2026)

Area
  - Total: 563.59 km^{2} (217.60 sq mi)
- Elevation: 3,438 m (11,280 ft)

Population (2005 census)
  - Total: 1,690
  - Density: 3.00/km^{2} (7.77/sq mi)
- Time zone: UTC-5 (PET)
- UBIGEO: 150716

San Antonio de Chaclla is one of the thirty-two districts of the province of Huarochirí, in the Department of Lima, in Peru. It borders to the north with the districts of Santa Rosa de Quives and Arahuay, both belonging to the province of Canta; to the east with the districts of Huachupampa, San Pedro de Casta, and Santa Eulalia; to the south with the district of Lurigancho-Chosica, province of Lima; and to the west with the districts of San Juan de Lurigancho and Carabayllo, both belonging to the province of Lima.

== History ==
Historically, the district is known as San Antonio de Chaclla since the founding of the town of Chaclla, located at 3,420 meters above sea level in the upper basin of the Santa Eulalia River. Within the ecclesiastical division of the Catholic Church of Peru, it belongs to Vicariate IV of the Diocese of Chosica. The district was created by Decree Law No. 10161 on January 5, 1945, during the first government of President Manuel Prado Ugarteche.

== Geography ==
It covers an area of 563.59 km² and has a population of 37,961 inhabitants according to RENIEC.

== Urban Landmarks ==
In its territory, there are conflict zones bordering some districts of the province of Lima, such as: Annexes 4 (end of Los Jardines Este avenue), 22 (Beyond Montenegro), and 2 (Campoy hills and part of Huachipa) of the peasant community of Jicamarca, which are areas in dispute with the district of San Juan de Lurigancho. Likewise, there is annex 8 (Huachipa), which is the area in conflict with the Lurigancho-Chosica district.

Its de facto capital is annex 8 of Jicamarca. According to the fact that the Jicamarca peasant community legally sold by sectors: (El Cercado 350 hectares, Pedregal, Las Lomas 240 hectares, La Chancadora 200 hectares, El Palomar, El Valle 1, San Isidro 26 hectares, Ana Yauri 1000 hectares and others) in the years 1999 to 2002, as recorded in items registered in SUNARP.

== Authorities ==
=== Municipal (2023 - 2026) ===
- Mayor: Nick Alexander Aponte Quispe, Regional Movement (La Familia)
- Councilors:
  - Rosmery Luz Astete Vellugas, Regional Movement (The Family)
  - Jared Heber Delgado Rodríguez, Regional Movement (The Family)
  - Pamela Vanessa Gómez Cerrón, Regional Movement (The Family)
  - Aurelio Julio Méndez Núñez, Regional Movement (The Family)
  - José Luis Aquino Chacón, Regional Movement (Young Homeland)

=== Previous Mayors: ===
- 2019 - 2022: Marisol Ordóñez Gutiérrez, Regional Movement (Young Homeland)
- 2015 - 2018: Eveling Geovanna Feliciano Ordoñez, Regional Movement (Young Homeland)
- 2011 - 2014: Eveling Geovanna Feliciano Ordóñez, Regional Movement (The Family)
- 2007 - 2010: Cayetano Donato Rímac Ventura, Political Party (Always United)
- 2003 - 2006: Cayetano Donato Rímac Ventura, Electoral Alliance (National Unity)
- 1999 - 2002: Máximo Ocaris Julca, Independent Movement (Somos Perú)
- 1996 - 1998: Julio Hermenegildo Huamán Méndez, Political Party (Popular Action)
- 1993 - 1995: Julio Hermenegildo Huamán Méndez, Political Party (Popular Action)
- 1990 - 1992: Liborio Huamán Sánchez, Alliance (United Left)
- 1987 - 1989: Andrés Avelino Méndez Carrillo, Alliance (United Left)
- 1984 - 1986: Lucio Arroyo Chauca, Political Party (Popular Action)
- 1981 - 1983: Ignacio Méndez Chauca, Political Party (Popular Action)

=== Police ===
- San Antonio de Chaclla Police Station, located near the municipality
- Commissioner: Major PNP.

== Education ==
=== Educational Institutions ===
- IE 0027 "San Antonio de Jicamarca"
- IE 1277 "Divine Savior"
- IE 20955-22 "Bellavista Union"
- IE 20625 "Virgin of the Nativity"
- IE 20955-15 "Half Moon Vineyards"
- IE 20955-17 - "San Francisco de Jicamarca"
- IE 20955-27 "VERITATIS SPLENDOR"
- IE "ANTENOR ORREGO"
- IE "BEAUTIFUL VALLEY"

== Festivities ==
- June: San Antonio
