= Mulli (Peru) =

Mountain in Peru

- Location within Peru

Highest point
- Elevation: 5,000 m (16,000 ft)
- Coordinates: 11°54′22″S 76°16′43″W

Geography
- Location: Peru, Lima Region
- Parent range: Andes, Cordillera Central

Mulli (Quechua for Peruvian pepper tree, also spelled Molle) is a mountain in the Cordillera Central in the Andes of Peru, about 5,000-metre (16,404 ft) high. It lies in the Lima Region, Huarochirí Province, San Damian District. It is situated on a ridge southwest of Utush Mikhunan is situated northwest of Uqhu and Suyruqucha.
