= Saqsa =

Mountain in the Andes of Peru

- Location within Peru

Highest point
- Elevation: 4,800 m (15,700 ft)
- Coordinates: 11°32′09″S 76°26′30″W

Geography
- Location: Peru, Lima Region
- Parent range: Andes

Saqsa (Quechua for multi-colored, also spelled Sacsa) is a mountain in the Andes of Peru, about 4,800 m (15,748 ft) high. It is situated in the Lima Region, Huarochirí Province, Huanza District. Saqsa lies between two lakes named Saqsaqucha and P'itiqucha, southwest of P'iti and northeast of Qullqi and Uyshu.
