= Cuenca =

Cuenca may refer to:

== People ==
- Cuenca (surname)

== Places ==
=== Ecuador ===
- Cuenca Canton, in the Azuay Province
  - Cuenca, Ecuador, capital of Cuenca Canton and Azuay Province
  - Roman Catholic Archdiocese of Cuenca

=== Peru ===
- Cuenca District, Huarochirí
- Cuenca District, Huancavelica

=== Philippines ===
- Cuenca, Batangas

=== Spain ===
- Province of Cuenca, a province in Spain
  - Cuenca, Spain, capital of the province above
    - Cuenca Railway Station
  - Cuenca (Spanish Congress electoral district)
  - Roman Catholic Diocese of Cuenca
- Cuenca de Campos, Valladolid
- Cuenca de Pamplona, Navarre
- Cuencas Mineras, Aragon
- Cuenca Minera (Huelva), Andalusia

=== United States ===
- Cuenca, Spanish name for Joara, a historical Native American settlement in modern-day North Carolina

== Other uses ==
- C.D. Cuenca, a football team in Cuenca, Ecuador
- University of Cuenca, a university in Cuenca, Ecuador
- Cuenca Province (Gran Colombia), a defunct province of a defunct country
