= Ukrupata =

Mountain in Peru

- Location within Peru

Highest point
- Elevation: 5,300 m (17,400 ft)
- Coordinates: 11°37′09″S 76°18′28″W

Geography
- Location: Peru, Lima Region
- Parent range: Andes

Ukrupata (Quechua ukru hole, pit, hollow, pata elevated place; above, at the top; edge, bank (of a river), shore, Hispanicized spelling Urcupata) is a mountain in the Andes of Peru, about 5,300 m (17,388 ft) high. It is situated in the Lima Region, Huarochirí Province, on the border of the districts of Chicla and Carampoma. Ukrupata lies northwest of Millpu and east of Wamp'ar and the two lakes named Wamp'arqucha and Wachwaqucha.
