= San Pedro District =

San Pedro District may refer to the following places:

== Costa Rica ==
- San Pedro District, Barva, in Barva, Heredia Province
- San Pedro District, Montes de Oca, in Montes de Oca (canton), San José Province
- San Pedro District, Pérez Zeledón, in Pérez Zeledón (canton), San José Province
- San Pedro District, Poás, in Poás (canton), Alajuela Province
- San Pedro District, Santa Bárbara, in Santa Bárbara (canton), Heredia Province
- San Pedro District, Turrubares, in Turrubares (canton), San José Province
- San Pedro District, Sarchí, in Sarchí (canton), Alajuela Province

== Paraguay ==
- San Pedro District, Paraguay, San Pedro Department

== Peru ==
- San Pedro District, Canchis, Canchis Province, Cusco Region
- San Pedro District, Lucanas, Lucanas Province, Ayacucho Region
- San Pedro District, Ocros, Ocros Province, Ancash Region
- San Pedro de Cachora District, in Abancay Province, Apurímac Region
- San Pedro de Cajas District, in Tarma Province, Junín Region
- San Pedro de Casta District, in Huarochirí Province, Lima Region
- San Pedro de Chana District, in Huari Province, Ancash Region
- San Pedro de Chaulán District, in Huánuco Province, Huánuco Region
- San Pedro de Chunan District, in Jauja Province, Junín Region
- San Pedro de Coris District, in Churcampa Province, Huancavelica Region
- San Pedro de Huacarpana District, in Chincha Province, Ica Region
- San Pedro de Huancayre District, in Huarochirí Province, Lima Region
- San Pedro de Larcay District, in Sucre Province, Ayacucho Region
- San Pedro de Lloc District, in Pacasmayo Province, La Libertad Region
- San Pedro de Palco District, in Lucanas Province, Ayacucho Region
- San Pedro de Pilas District, in Yauyos Province, Lima Region
- San Pedro de Pillao District, in Daniel Alcides Carrión Province, Pasco Region
- San Pedro de Putina Punco District, in Sandia Province, Puno Region
- San Pedro de Saño District, in Huancayo Province, Junín Region

== See also ==
- San Pedro (disambiguation)
