= Rukutu =

Mountain in Peru

- Location within Peru

Highest point
- Elevation: 4,800 m (15,700 ft)
- Coordinates: 11°56′14″S 76°13′15″W

Geography
- Location: Peru, Lima Region
- Parent range: Andes, Cordillera Central

Rukutu (Quechua for rukutu, ruqutu a plant (Capsicum pubescens), hispanicized spelling Rocodo) is a mountain in the Cordillera Central in the Andes of Peru, about 4,800 metres (15,748 ft) high. It is situated in the Lima Region, Huarochirí Province, on the border of the districts of Huarochirí and San Damian. It lies south of Suyruqucha and Suqlla, and northeast of Wamanripa.
