= San Mateo District =

San Mateo District may refer to:

- San Mateo District, Huarochirí, in Huarochirí province, Lima region, Peru
- San Mateo District, San Mateo, in San Mateo (canton), Alajuela province, Costa Rica
- San Mateo de Otao District, in Huarochirí province, Lima region, Peru

== See also ==
- San Mateo (disambiguation)
