= Wamanripa (disambiguation) =

Wamanripa (Quechua for Senecio or species of it, also applied for Laccopetalum giganteum, hispanicized spellings Huamanripa, Huamanrripa, also Huamalipa, Huamanlipa, derived from the conjugation of the Quechua words: waman, meaning falcon, and ripa), may refer to:

- Wamanripa (Carampoma), a mountain in the Carampoma District, Huarochirí Province, Lima Region, Peru
- Wamanripa (Cusco), a mountain in the Cusco Region, Peru
- Wamanripa (Huarochirí-San Damian), a mountain in the districts of Huarochirí and San Damian in the Huarochirí Province, Lima Region, Peru
- Wamanripa (Huaura), a mountain in the Huaura Province, Lima Region, Peru
- Wamanripa (Junín), a mountain in the Junín Region, Peru
- Wamanripa (San Mateo), a mountain in the San Mateo District, Huarochirí Province, Lima Region, Peru
- Wamanripa (Yauyos), a mountain in the Yauyos Province, Lima Region, Peru

== See also ==
- Hatun Wamanripa
- Wamanripayuq (disambiguation)
