= Anta Ranra =

Mountain in Peru

- Location within Peru

Highest point
- Elevation: 4,800 m (15,700 ft)
- Coordinates: 11°33′26″S 76°25′43″W

Geography
- Location: Peru, Lima Region
- Parent range: Andes

Anta Ranra (quechua anta copper, ranra stony, stony place, "stony copper place", also spelled Antarangra) is a mountain in the Andes of Peru which reaches an altitude of approximately 4,800 metres (15,748 ft). It is located in the Lima Region, Huarochirí Province, Huanza District. Anta Ranra lies south of a lake named P'itiqucha.
