= Kashpi =

Mountain in Peru

- Location within Peru

Highest point
- Elevation: 5,200 m (17,100 ft)
- Coordinates: 11°30′54″S 76°21′42″W

Geography
- Location: Peru, Lima Region, Junín Region
- Parent range: Andes

Kashpi (local Quechua for stick (k'aspi), Hispanicized spelling Cashpe) is a mountain in the Andes of Peru, about 5,200 metres (17,060 ft) high. The mountain is located in the Junín Region, Yauli Province, Marcapomacocha District, and in the Lima Region, Huarochirí Province, Huanza District. It lies southeast of Chunta and northwest of a lake named Pukaqucha.
