= Piti =

Piti may refer to:

- Pīti, a mental factor in Buddhism
- PITI, the principal, interest, taxes, and insurance sum of a mortgage payment
- Piti (food), a soup dish of the South Caucasus and Central Asia
- Piti (footballer) (born 1981), Spanish footballer
- Piti, Guam, a village on the central west coast of Guam
- Piti language, a language of Nigeria
- P'iti or Piti, a mountain in the Lima Region, Peru

== See also ==
- Piti Guns, a heritage site in Piti, Guam
