= Huarochirí District =

Coordinates: 12.1364°S 76.2350°W

Huarochirí Waruchiri
- District
- Interactive map of Huarochirí; Waruchiri
- Country: Peru
- Region: Lima
- Province: Huarochirí
- Capital: Huarochirí

Government
  - Mayor: Eveling Geovanna Feliciano Ordoñez (2019-2022)

Area
  - Total: 249.09 km^{2} (96.17 sq mi)
- Elevation: 3,146 m (10,322 ft)

Population (2017)
  - Total: 1,302
  - Density: 5.227/km^{2} (13.54/sq mi)
- Time zone: UTC-5 (PET)
- UBIGEO: 150709

Huarochirí District (in Hispanicized spelling) or Waruchiri is one of thirty-two districts of the province Huarochirí in Peru. Despite its name, it is not the provincial seat; the seat is at Matucana.

== See also ==
- Rukutu
- Suyruqucha
- Wamanripa
- Yawriq
