= Utush Mikhunan =

Mountain in Peru

- Location within Peru

Highest point
- Elevation: 5,228 m (17,152 ft)
- Coordinates: 11°52′55″S 76°15′57″W

Geography
- Location: Peru, Lima Region
- Parent range: Andes, Cordillera Central

Utush Mikhunan (Quechua utush a plant of the family Asteraceae, mikhuna meal, -n a suffix, Hispanicized spelling Otoshmicunan) is a 5,228-metre-high (17,152 ft) mountain in the Cordillera Central in the Andes of Peru. It lies in the Lima Region, Huarochirí Province, on the border of the districts of San Damian and San Mateo. Utush Mikhunan is situated northwest of Uqhu and Suyruqucha.
