= Wachwa =

Mountain in Peru

- Location within Peru

Highest point
- Elevation: 5,300 m (17,400 ft)
- Coordinates: 11°38′59″S 76°19′22″W

Geography
- Location: Peru, Lima Region
- Parent range: Andes

Wachwa (Quechua for 'Andean goose'; Hispanicized spelling Huachhua) is a mountain in the Andes of Peru, about 5,300 metres (17,388 ft) high. It is situated in the Lima Region, Huarochiri Province, on the border of the districts of Carampoma and Chicla. Wachwa lies southwest of Ukrupata and Millpu and southeast of the lake named Wachwaqucha (Quechua for "Andean goose lake", Hispanicized and broken name Huachuguacocha).
