= Yawriq =

Mountain in Peru

- Location within Peru

Highest point
- Elevation: 5,235 m (17,175 ft)
- Coordinates: 11°53′07″S 76°12′20″W

Geography
- Location: Peru, Lima Region
- Parent range: Andes, Cordillera Central

Yawriq (Quechua yawri a big needle, -q a suffix, Hispanicized spelling Yauric) is a 5,235-metre-high (17,175 ft) mountain in the Cordillera Central in the Andes of Peru. It lies in the Lima Region, Huarochirí Province, on the border of the districts of Huarochirí and San Mateo. Yawriq is situated northeast of Suyruqucha.
