= Qiwllaqucha (Huarochirí) =

Lake in Lima, Peru

- Location within Peru
- Location: Peru; Lima Region, Huarochirí Province
- Coordinates: 11°28′36″S 76°29′09″W

Qiwllaqucha (Quechua qillwa, qiwlla, qiwiña gull, qucha lake, "gull lake", Hispanicized names Lago Quiula, Laguna Quiula) is a lake at an unpopulated place of that name (Quiulacocha) in Peru located in the Lima Region, Huarochirí Province, Laraos District. Qiwllaqucha lies in the north of the district, southeast of Raqray. This is where the Qiwlla River (or Qiwllamayu in Quechua) originates. It flows to the south.
