= P'itiqucha (Huanza) =

Lake in Peru

- Location within Peru
- Location: Lima Region
- Coordinates: 11°32′42″S 76°26′03″W
- Basin countries: Peru

P'itiqucha (Quechua p'iti dividing by pulling powerfully to the extremes; gap, interruption, qucha lake, "gap lake", hispanicized names Lago Piti, Laguna Piti) is a lake in Peru located in the Lima Region, Huarochiri Province, Huanza District. P'itiqucha lies south of the Cordillera de la Corte surrounded by P'iti in the northeast, Anta Ranra in the south, Uyshu in the southwest and Saqsa in the northwest. It is situated southeast of Saqsaqucha.
