= Wamp'ar =

Mountain in Peru

- Location within Peru

Highest point
- Elevation: 4,800 m (15,700 ft)
- Coordinates: 11°36′58″S 76°18′58″W

Geography
- Location: Peru, Lima Region
- Parent range: Andes

Wamp'ar (Quechua for tripod, Hispanicized spelling Huampar) is a mountain in the Andes of Peru, about 4,800 m (15,748 ft) high. It is situated in the Lima Region, Huarochirí Province, Carampoma District. Wamp'ar lies west of Ukrupata and northeast and east of the two lakes named Wachwaqucha and Wamp'arqucha.
