= Shaqsha Punta =

Mountain in Peru

- Location within Peru

Highest point
- Elevation: 4,800 m (15,700 ft)
- Coordinates: 11°36′32″S 76°22′49″W

Geography
- Location: Peru, Lima Region
- Parent range: Andes

Shaqsha Punta (Quechua saqsa multi-colored, shaqsha jingle bell; a typical dancer of the Ancash Region, punta peak; ridge; first, before, in front of, Hispanicized spelling Shacsha Punta) is a mountain in the Andes of Peru which reaches an altitude of approximately 4,800 metres (15,748 ft). It is located in the Lima Region, Huarochirí Province, Carampoma District, northwest of Wamanripayuq.
