= Kunkus Yantaq =

Mountain in Peru

- Location within Peru

Highest point
- Elevation: 5,354 m (17,566 ft)
- Coordinates: 11°51′57″S 76°05′22″W

Geography
- Location: Peru, Lima Region
- Parent range: Andes, Paryaqaqa

Kunkus Yantaq (Ancash Quechua kunkush Puya raimondii, llamt'a, llant'a, yanta firewood, -q a suffix, Hispanicized spelling Cuncusyantac) is a 5,354-metre-high (17,566 ft) mountain in the Paryaqaqa mountain range in the Andes of Peru. It is located in the Lima Region, Huarochirí Province, San Mateo District. Kunkus Yantaq lies southeast of Qullqayuq.

The Yuraqmayu ("white river") originates southeast of Kunkus Yantaq. It is a left tributary of the Rimac River.
