= Raqray =

Mountain in Peru

- Location within Peru

Highest point
- Elevation: 4,800 m (15,700 ft)
- Coordinates: 11°28′12″S 76°28′30″W

Geography
- Location: Peru, Lima Region
- Parent range: Andes

Raqray (quechua for to slice, to crack open, Hispanicized spelling Racray) is a mountain in the Andes of Peru which reaches an altitude of approximately 4,800 metres (15,748 ft). It is located in the Lima Region, Canta Province, Huaros District, and in the Huarochirí Province, on the border of the districts of Huanza and Laraos. Raqray lies north of Kiwyu, northeast of a lake named Qiwllaqucha (Quechua for "gull lake").
