= Wamanripayuq (disambiguation) =

Wamanripayuq (Quechua wamanripa Senecio, -yuq a suffix, "the one with the wamanripa plant", also spelled Huamalipayoc, Huamanripayco, Huamanripayoc, Huamanripayoj, Huarmaripayoc) may refer to:

- Wamanripayuq, a mountain in the Quispicanchi Province, Cusco Region, Peru
- Wamanripayuq (Arequipa), a mountain in the Arequipa Region, Peru
- Wamanripayuq (Canchis), a mountain in the Canchis Province, Cusco Region, Peru
- Wamanripayuq (Huancavelica), a mountain in the Huancavelica Region, Peru
- Wamanripayuq (Huánuco), a mountain in the Huánuco Region, Peru
- Wamanripayuq (Lima), a mountain in the Lima Region, Peru
- Wamanripayuq (Urubamba), a mountain in the Urubamba Province, Cusco Region, Peru

== See also ==
- Wamanripa (disambiguation)
