= San Juan de Iris District =

Coordinates: 11°41′05″S 76°31′39″W

San Juan de Iris
- District
- Interactive map of San Juan de Iris
- Country: Peru
- Region: Lima
- Province: Huarochirí
- Founded: July 24, 1964
- Capital: San Juan de Iris

Government
  - Mayor: Nelson De La Cruz Davalos

Area
  - Total: 124.31 km^{2} (48.00 sq mi)
- Elevation: 3,400 m (11,200 ft)

Population (2005 census)
  - Total: 234
  - Density: 1.88/km^{2} (4.88/sq mi)
- Time zone: UTC-5 (PET)
- UBIGEO: 150719

San Juan de Iris District is one of thirty-two districts of the province Huarochirí in Peru.
