= Yuraqmayu (Lima) =

Yuraqmayu Río Blanco
- Etymology: Quechua

Location
- Country: Peru
- Region: Lima Region

Physical characteristics
- Source
  - location: San Mateo District
  - coordinates: 11°52′25″S 76°04′26″W
- Mouth
  - location: Chicla-San Mateo
  - coordinates: 11°43′59″S 76°16′9″W
- Length: 36.2 km (22.5 mi)

Yuraqmayu Dam
- Location within Peru

Dam and spillways
- Height: 56 m (184 ft)
- Length: 590 m (1,940 ft)

Reservoir
- Total capacity: 46,500,000 m^{3} (37,700 acre⋅ft)

Power Station
- Operator: Edegel

The Yuraqmayu (Quechua yuraq white, mayu river, "white river", hispaniciced spelling Yuracmayo) or Río Blanco (Spanish for "white river") is a 36.2 km long river in Peru located in the Lima Region, Huarochirí Province, in the districts of Chicla and San Mateo. It is a left tributary of the Rimac River which empties into the Pacific Ocean.

The river originates in the San Mateo District, southeast of Kunkus Yantaq. Its direction is mainly to the northwest. Upstream it is the natural border between the districts of Chicla and San Mateo. The confluence with the Rimac River is south of Chicla.

The Yuraqmayu dam which was erected near the village of Yuraqmayu at 11°50′15″S 76°09′33″W was erected in 1995. It is 56 m (184 ft) high and 590 m (650 yd) long. It is operated by Edegel. The reservoir has a volume of 1,667,000 m^{3} (1,351 acre⋅ft) and a capacity of 46,500,000 m^{3} (37,700 acre⋅ft).
