= Antioquia District =

Coordinates: 12°04′50.6″S 76°30′38.2″W

Antioquia
- District
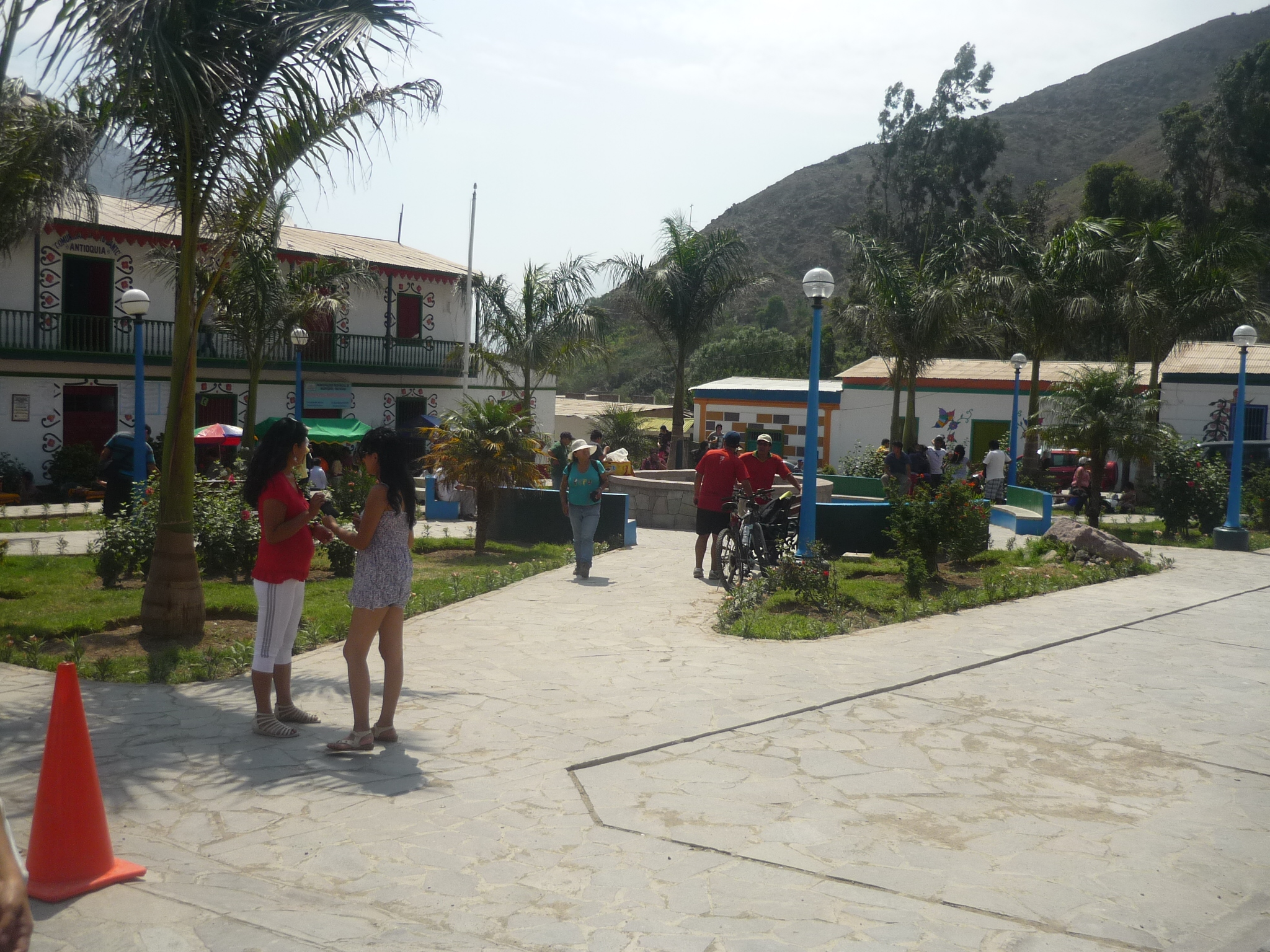
- Plaza of the town of Antioquia
- Interactive map of Antioquia
- Country: Peru
- Region: Lima
- Province: Huarochirí
- Founded: April 5, 1935
- Capital: Espiritu Santo

Government
  - Mayor: Luis Hilibrando Ramos (2019-2022)

Area
  - Total: 387.98 km^{2} (149.80 sq mi)
- Elevation: 1,526 m (5,007 ft)

Population (2017)
  - Total: 1,225
  - Density: 3.5/km^{2} (9.1/sq mi)
- Time zone: UTC-5 (PET)
- UBIGEO: 150702
- Website: Official website

Antioquia District is one of thirty-two districts of the province Huarochirí in Peru.

== Population ==
The population of the district is 1,225 people as of the 2017 census.

Name	Class	Homes	Population
Antioquia	Urban	171	337
Cochahuayco	Rural	165	170
Other	Rural	626	869

== See also ==
- Huarochirí Province
- Lima Region
- Administrative divisions of Peru
