= San Andrés de Tupicocha District =

Coordinates: 12.0019°S 76.4746°W

San Andrés de Tupicocha Tupiqucha
- District
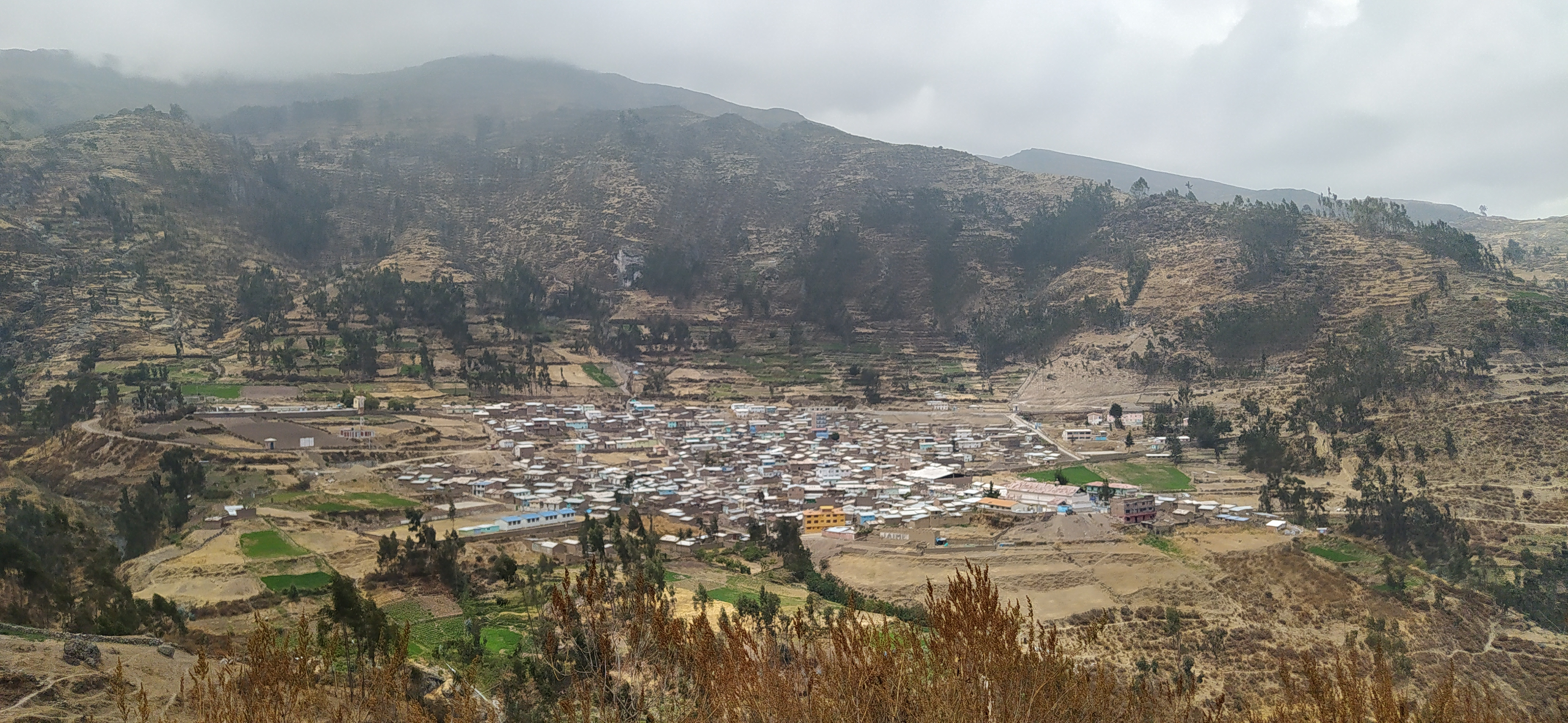
- Interactive map of San Andrés de Tupicocha
- Country: Peru
- Region: Lima
- Province: Huarochirí
- Founded: December 31, 1943
- Capital: San Andrés de Tupicocha

Government
  - Mayor: Mesias Teodoro Rojas Melo

Area
  - Total: 83.35 km^{2} (32.18 sq mi)
- Elevation: 3,606 m (11,831 ft)

Population (2005 census)
  - Total: 1,471
  - Density: 17.65/km^{2} (45.71/sq mi)
- Time zone: UTC-5 (PET)
- UBIGEO: 150715

San Andrés de Tupicocha District is one of thirty-two districts of the province Huarochirí in Peru.
