= Sangallaya District =

Coordinates: 12.1610°S 76.2291°W

Sangallaya
- District
- Interactive map of Sangallaya
- Country: Peru
- Region: Lima
- Province: Huarochirí
- Founded: September 30, 1954
- Capital: Sangallaya

Government
  - Mayor: Marcelino Armando Valencia Tello

Area
  - Total: 81.92 km^{2} (31.63 sq mi)
- Elevation: 2,738 m (8,983 ft)

Population (2005 census)
  - Total: 689
  - Density: 8.41/km^{2} (21.8/sq mi)
- Time zone: UTC-5 (PET)
- UBIGEO: 150726

Sangallaya District is one of thirty-two districts of the province Huarochirí in Peru.
