= Cuenca (surname) =

Cuenca is a surname. Notable people with the surname include:

- César Cuenca (born 1981), Argentine boxer
- Christina Cuenca (born 1980), American beauty queen
- Flor Cuenca (born 1977), Peruvian mountaineer
- Isaac Cuenca (born 1991), Spanish footballer
- Jake Cuenca (born 1987), American-born Filipino actor
- Jean-José Cuenca (born 1986), French footballer
- João Paulo Cuenca (born 1978), Brazilian writer
- Jorge Cuenca (born 1999), Spanish footballer
- Luis Cuenca (1921–2004), Spanish actor
- María Guadalupe Cuenca (1790–1854), Bolivian-born Argentine letter writer
- Mario Cuenca (born 1975), Argentine footballer
- Rodolfo Cuenca (1928–2023), Filipino businessman
- Victoria Cuenca, 20th-century Argentine actress, vedette
- Mike Cuenca, an American film director
