= San Mateo, Huarochirí province =

San Mateo
- Town
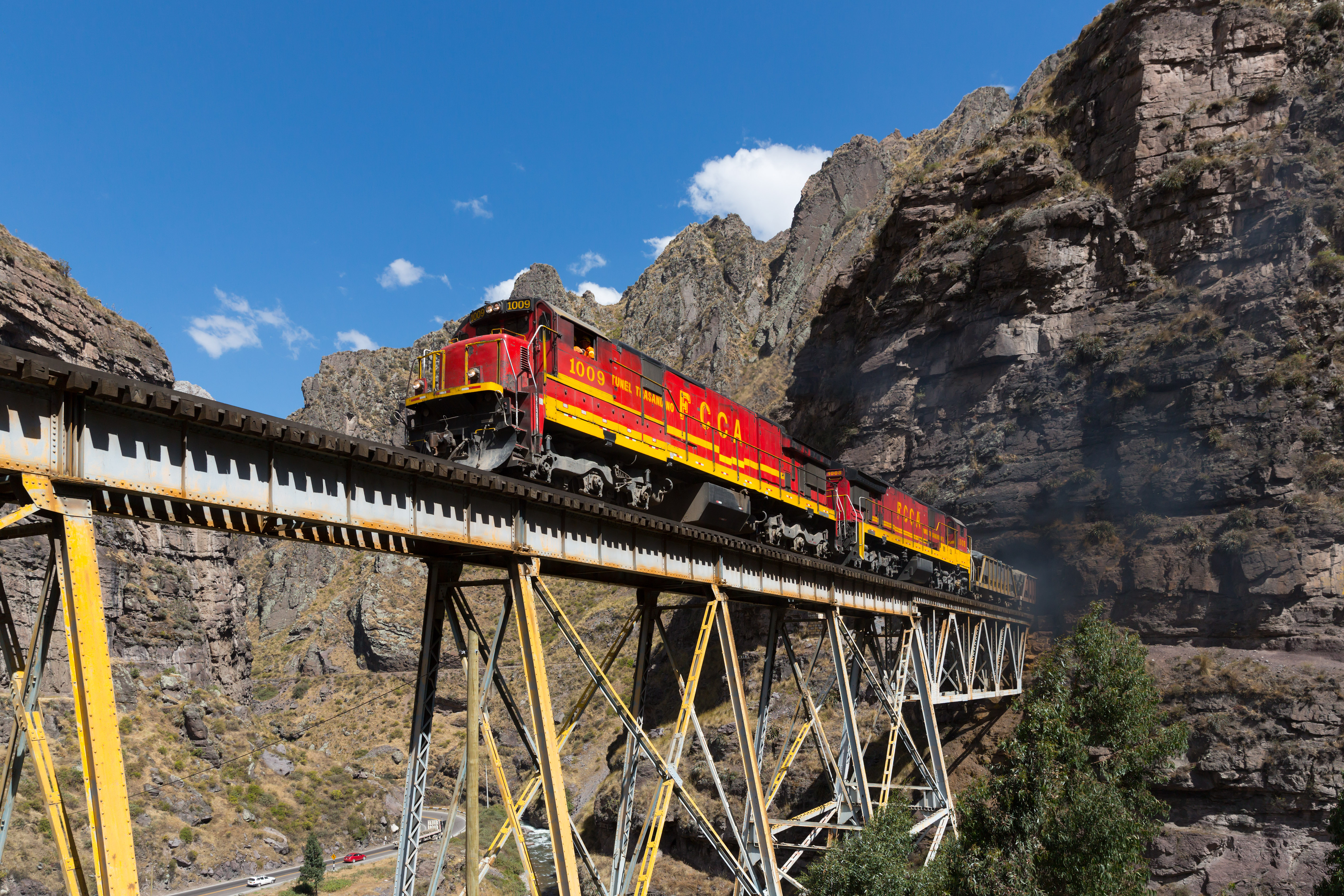
- FCCA (Ferrocarril Central Andino) nrs. 1008 and 1009, two GE C30-7, are crossing a steel bridge between Rio Blanco and San Mateo

- Location within Peru
- Coordinates: 11°45′31″S 76°18′00″W
- Country: Peru
- Region: Lima
- Province: Huarochirí
- District: San Mateo

Government
  - Mayor: Luis Eduardo Rincon Franco (2019-2022)
- Time zone: UTC-5 (PET)

San Mateo or San Mateo de Huánchor is the capital of San Mateo District in Huarochirí Province, Peru.

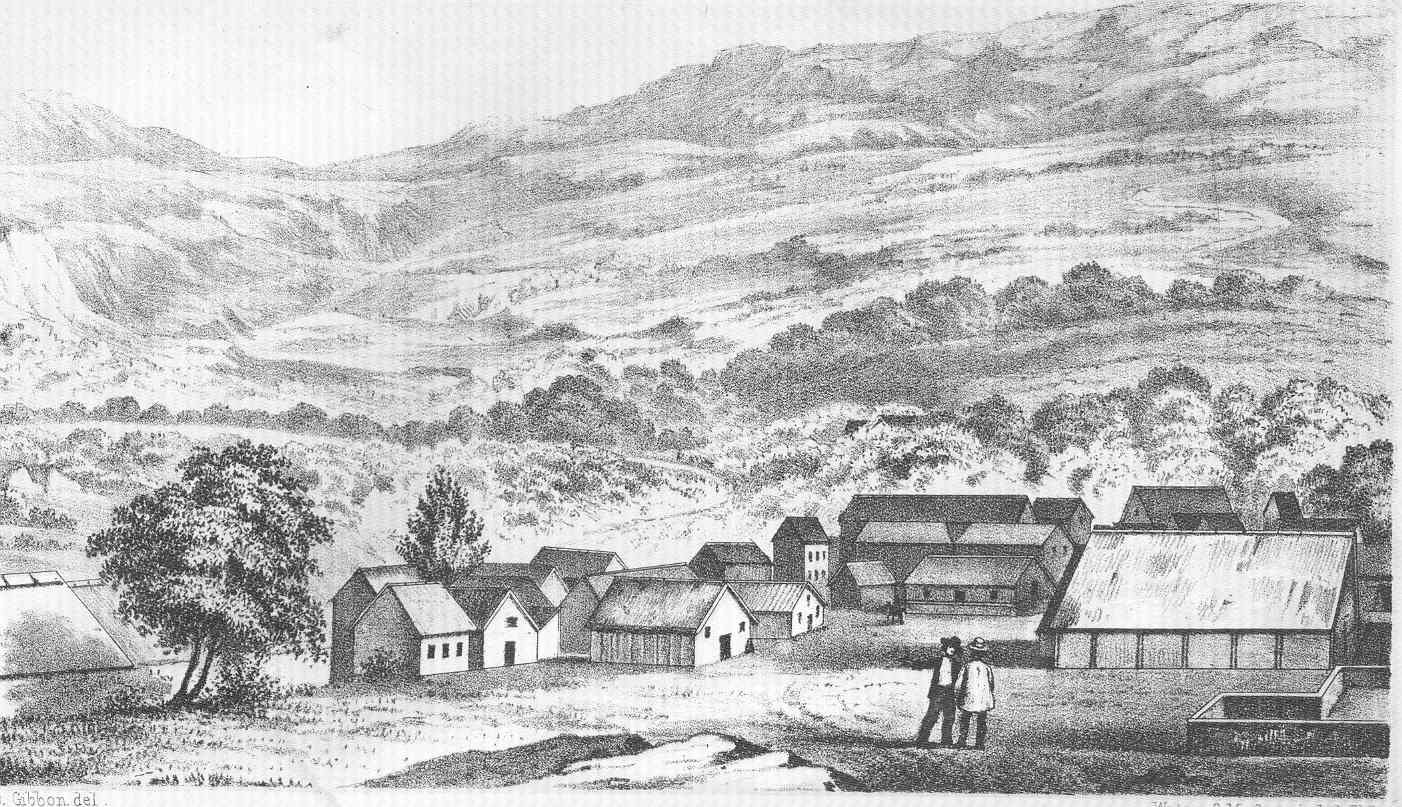
San Mateo, ca. 1852
