= Santiago de Anchucaya District =

Coordinates: 12.0955°S 76.2302°W

Santiago de Anchucaya
- District
- Interactive map of Santiago de Anchucaya
- Country: Peru
- Region: Lima
- Province: Huarochirí
- Founded: March 17, 1962
- Capital: Santiago de Anchucaya

Government
  - Mayor: Nilton Mayer Saavedra Palomo

Area
  - Total: 94.01 km^{2} (36.30 sq mi)
- Elevation: 3,384 m (11,102 ft)

Population (2005 census)
  - Total: 557
  - Density: 5.92/km^{2} (15.3/sq mi)
- Time zone: UTC-5 (PET)
- UBIGEO: 150729

Santiago de Anchucaya District is one of thirty-two districts of the province Huarochirí in Peru.
