= Santo Domingo de los Olleros District =

Coordinates: 12°13′13″S 76°30′58″W

Santo Domingo de los Olleros
- District
- Interactive map of Santo Domingo de los Olleros
- Country: Peru
- Region: Lima
- Province: Huarochirí
- Capital: Santo Domingo de los Olleros

Government
  - Mayor: Sandra Foraquita Salazar

Area
  - Total: 552.32 km^{2} (213.25 sq mi)
- Elevation: 2,830 m (9,280 ft)

Population (2005 census)
  - Total: 2,084
  - Density: 3.773/km^{2} (9.772/sq mi)
- Time zone: UTC-5 (PET)
- UBIGEO: 150731

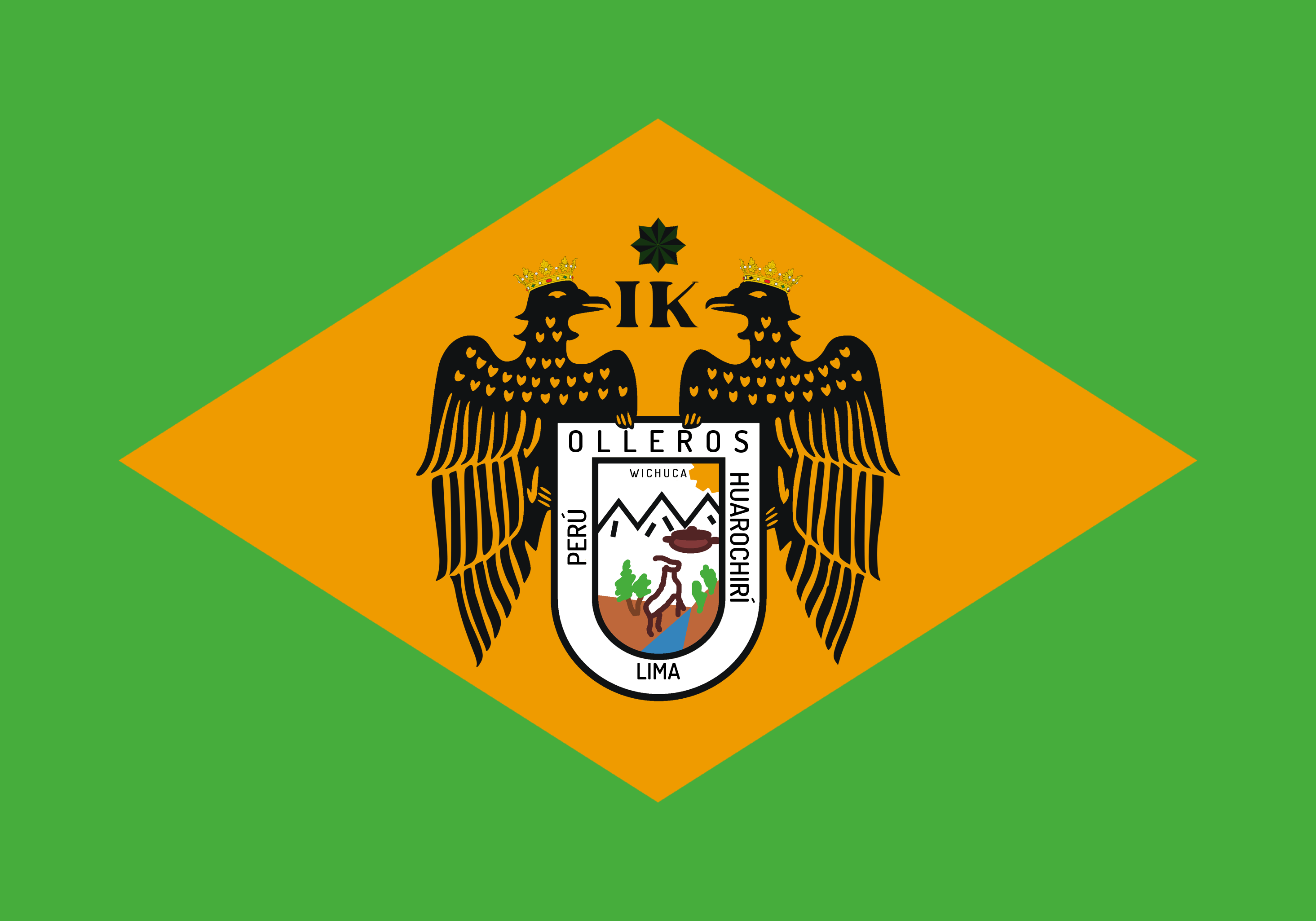
Flag of Santo Domingo de los Ollerors

Santo Domingo de los Olleros District is one of thirty-two districts of the province Huarochirí in Peru.
