= Awqa Pallqa =

Mountain in Peru

- Location within Peru

Highest point
- Elevation: 5,000 m (16,000 ft)
- Coordinates: 11°37′55″S 76°24′07″W

Geography
- Location: Peru, Lima Region
- Parent range: Andes

Awqa Pallqa (Aymara and Quechua awqa enemy, pallqa bifurcation, "enemy's bifurcation", also spelled Aucapallca) is a mountain in the Andes of Peru which reaches an altitude of approximately 5,000 metres (16,404 ft). It is located in the Lima Region, Huarochirí Province, Carampoma District. Awqa Pallqa lies west of Wamanripayuq.
