= Huaros District =

Coordinates: 11.4067°S 76.5754°W

Huaros
- District
- Interactive map of Huaros
- Country: Peru
- Region: Lima
- Province: Canta
- Founded: December 30, 1944
- Capital: Huaros

Government
  - Mayor: Pedro Pablo Bandan Camargo

Area
  - Total: 333.45 km^{2} (128.75 sq mi)
- Elevation: 3,583 m (11,755 ft)

Population (2017)
  - Total: 760
  - Density: 2.3/km^{2} (5.9/sq mi)
- Time zone: UTC-5 (PET)
- UBIGEO: 150404

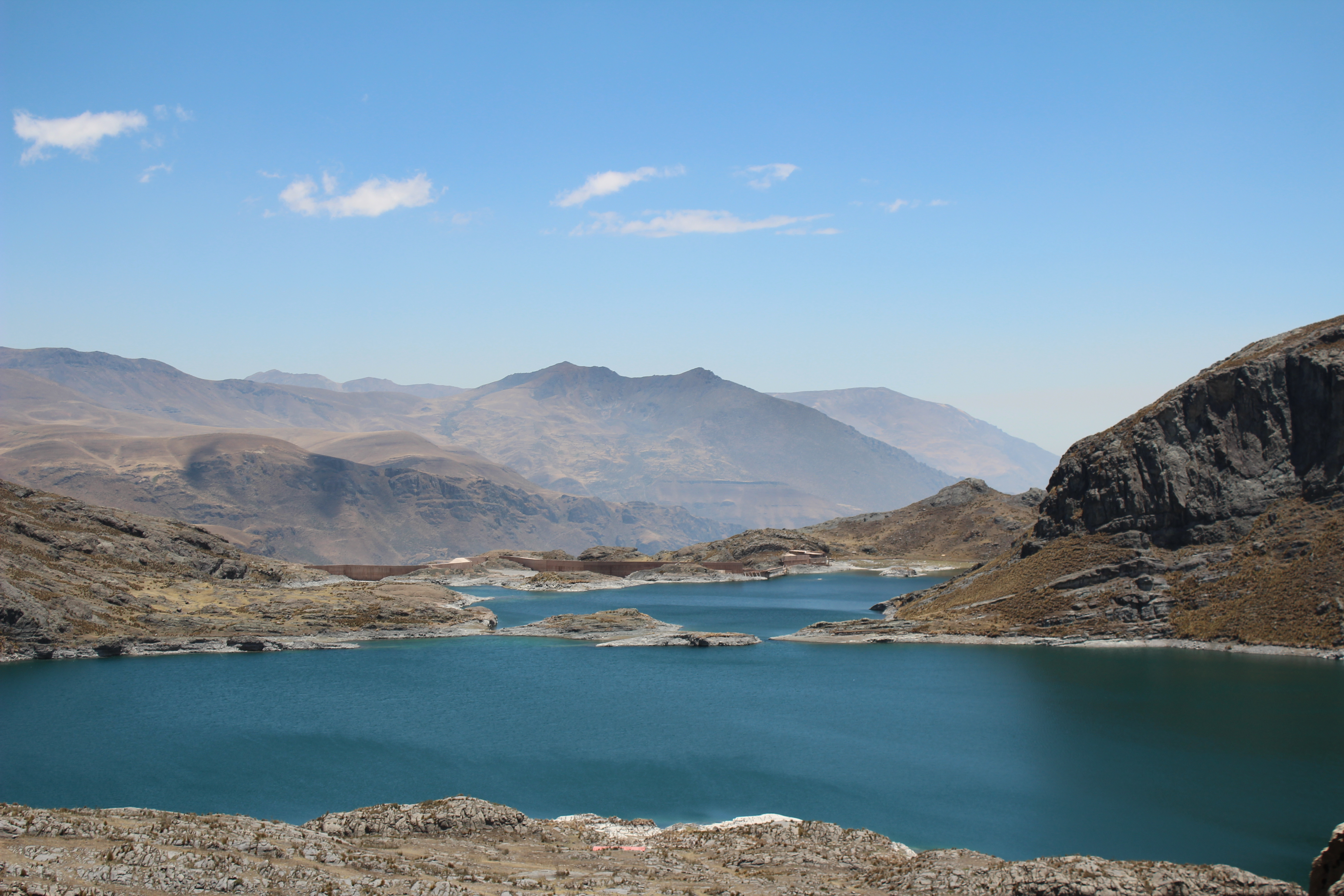

Huaros District is one of seven districts of the province Canta in Peru.

== Geography ==
One of the highest peaks of the district is Chunta at 5,208 m (17,087 ft). Other mountains are listed below:

- Anta Mantay
- Anta Phiruru
- Aqu Mach'ay
- Pistaq Mach'ay
- Qullpa P'iti
- Raqray
- Silla Rumi
- Yana Markan
- Yana Punta
- Yanama
