= Antaqucha (Lima) =

- Location within Peru
- Location: Lima Region, Huarochirí Province, Huachupampa District
- Coordinates: 11°38′20″S 76°34′58″W
- Basin countries: Peru
- Max. length: Dam 60 m (200 ft) Lake 380 m (1,250 ft)
- Max. width: Dam 5 m (16 ft) Lake 130 m (430 ft)
- Max. depth: 10 m (33 ft)
- Surface elevation: 4,480 m (14,700 ft)

Antaqucha Dam
- Location within Peru
- Country: Peru

Dam and spillways
- Height: 10 m (33 ft)
- Length: 60 m (200 ft)

Antaqucha (Quechua anta copper, qucha lake, "copper lake", Hispanicized spelling Antacocha) is a lake in Peru located in the Lima Region, Huarochirí Province, Huachupampa District. It is situated at a height of approximately 4,480 m (14,700 ft).

Antaqucha is notable for its dam, dating back to the pre-Inca period. The dam is 60 m (66 yd) long, 10 m (33 ft) high and 5 m (5.5 yd) wide.

== See also ==
- List of lakes in Peru
