= Anta Mantay =

Mountain in Peru

- Location within Peru

Highest point
- Elevation: 4,800 m (15,700 ft)
- Coordinates: 11°26′51″S 76°27′39″W

Geography
- Location: Peru, Lima Region
- Parent range: Andes

Anta Mantay (Quechua anta copper, mantay to spread out, also spelled Antamantay) is a mountain in the Andes of Peru which reaches an altitude of approximately 4,800 metres (15,748 ft). It is located in the Lima Region, Canta Province, Huaros District. Anta Machay lies northwest and west of a lake named Tuqtuqucha ("broody hen's lake", also named Mellizas de Tactococha or Mellizas de Tuctococha).
