= Carampoma District =

Coordinates: 11.6560°S 76.5165°W

Carampoma
- District
- Interactive map of Carampoma
- Country: Peru
- Region: Lima
- Province: Huarochirí
- Capital: Carampoma

Government
  - Mayor: Lucio Pedro Julca Mateo (2019-2022)

Area
  - Total: 234.21 km^{2} (90.43 sq mi)
- Elevation: 3,408 m (11,181 ft)

Population (2017)
  - Total: 331
  - Density: 1.41/km^{2} (3.66/sq mi)
- Time zone: UTC-5 (PET)
- UBIGEO: 150704

Carampoma District is one of thirty-two districts of the province Huarochirí in Peru.

== Geography ==
The La Viuda mountain range traverses the district. Some of the highest mountains of the district are listed below:

- Antapampa
- Awqa Pallqa
- Janq'uni
- Lichiqucha
- Liyunqucha
- Millpu
- Millu
- Phiruruyuq
- Qarwa Ranra
- Shaqsha Punta
- Taksaqucha
- Ukrupata
- Wachwa
- Wamanripa
- Wamanripayuq
- Wamp'ar
- Yana Ulla
- Yana Yana

== See also ==
- Wachwaqucha
- Wamp'arqucha
