= Huacaypaca =

Mountain in Peru

- Location within Peru

Highest point
- Elevation: 5,365 m (17,602 ft)
- Coordinates: 11°56′10″S 76°8′27″W

Geography
- Location: Peru, Lima Region
- Parent range: Andes, Cordillera Central

Huacaypaca (possibly from Quechua waqay, to cry, crying, paka eagle) is a mountain in the Cordillera Central in the Andes of Peru, 5,365 metres (17,602 ft) high. It lies in the Lima Region, Huarochiri Province, in the north of the Tantaranche District. Huacaypaca is situated northeast of a lake named Chumpicocha. Huacaypaca lies south-west of the mountains Wisk'achani and Huapalco, north-west of Chumpicocha, and southeast of the mountain Yana Kunka. It is southwest of Punta Sur (Southeast Point) and southeast of the Cerro Coqueña massif. Huacaypaca is also the name of the neighboring lake east of the mountain.

Huacaypaca receives about 2,900 millimetres (113 in) of precipitation during a year. The average temperature is 15 °C (59 °F).
