= Langa District =

Coordinates: 12°07′31″S 76°25′24″W

Langa
- District
- Interactive map of Langa
- Country: Peru
- Region: Lima
- Province: Huarochirí
- Founded: November 17, 1912
- Capital: Langa

Government
  - Mayor: Elver Lulu Castro Quispe

Area
  - Total: 80.99 km^{2} (31.27 sq mi)
- Elevation: 2,856 m (9,370 ft)

Population (2005 census)
  - Total: 1,181
  - Density: 14.58/km^{2} (37.77/sq mi)
- Time zone: UTC-5 (PET)
- UBIGEO: 150711

Langa District is one of thirty-two districts of the province Huarochirí in Peru.
