= Badlands Guardian =

Geomorphological feature in Canada

- Geomorphological feature
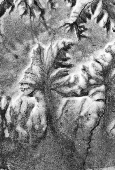
- Badlands Guardian in 1938, before the creation of the road that resembles the earphones

- Location within Alberta
- Coordinates: 50°00′38.20″N 110°06′48.32″W
- Location: Near Medicine Hat, Alberta, Canada
- Formed by: Erosion

Dimensions
  - Length: 255m
  - Width: 225m

The Badlands Guardian is a geomorphological feature located near Medicine Hat in the southeast corner of Alberta, Canada. The feature was discovered in 2005 by Lynn Hickox through use of Google Earth.

== Description ==
Viewed from the air, the feature has been said to resemble a human head wearing a full Indigenous type of headdress, facing directly westward. An additional road (Township Road 123A) and an oil well have been said to resemble a pair of earphones worn by the figure, which were installed in the early 2000s and are expected to disappear once the oil well is abandoned.

The head is a drainage feature created through erosion of soft, clay-rich stratum by the action of wind and water. The arid badlands are typified by infrequent but intense rain-showers, sparse vegetation and soft sediments. Although the image appears to be a convex feature, it is actually concave – and therefore, a valley, and is an instance of the Hollow-Face illusion. Its age is estimated to be in the hundreds of years at a minimum.

In 2006, suitable names were canvassed by CBC Radio One program As It Happens. Out of more than 140 names submitted, seven were suggested to the Cypress County Council. They altered the suggested "Guardian of the Badlands" to become "Badlands Guardian".

The Badlands Guardian was also described by the Sydney Morning Herald as a "net sensation". PCWorld magazine has referred to the formation as a "geological marvel". It is listed as the seventh of the top ten Google Earth finds by Time magazine.

There also appears to be another face on the surface nearby in the terrain surrounding the Badlands Guardian location.

== See also ==
- Apophenia, the tendency to perceive connections between unrelated things
- Pareidolia, the phenomenon of perceiving faces in random patterns
- "Face on Mars", photographed by Viking 1 in 1976
- Inuksuk, traditional Native Arctic peoples' stone "marker statuaries" in Alaska and Arctic Canada
- Marcahuasi, a plateau in the Andes, near Lima, Peru with numerous rock formations with surprising likenesses to specific animals, people, and religious symbols.
- Old Man of the Mountain, (former) rock profile in New Hampshire (collapsed on May 3, 2003)
- Old Man of Hoy, a rock pillar off Scotland that resembles a standing man
- Sheep Mountain (Teton County, Wyoming), a mountain in Wyoming that resembles a sleeping Native American
