= Yana Yana (Lima) =

Mountain in Peru

- Location within Peru

Highest point
- Elevation: 5,303 m (17,398 ft)
- Coordinates: 11°43′06″S 76°19′51″W

Geography
- Location: Peru, Lima Region
- Parent range: Andes, Cordillera Central

Yana Yana (Quechua yana black, the reduplication indicates that there is a group or a complex of something, "a complex of black color"; also spelled Yanayana) is a 5,303-metre-high (17,398 ft) mountain in the Cordillera Central in the Andes of Peru. It is situated in the Lima Region, Huarochiri Province, on the border of the districts of Carampoma, Matucana and San Mateo, north of the Rimac River. Yana Yana lies southeast of Qarwa Ranra.
