= Marcahuasi =

Plateau in the Andes Mountains, Peru

Coordinates: 11°47′20″S 76°34′25″W

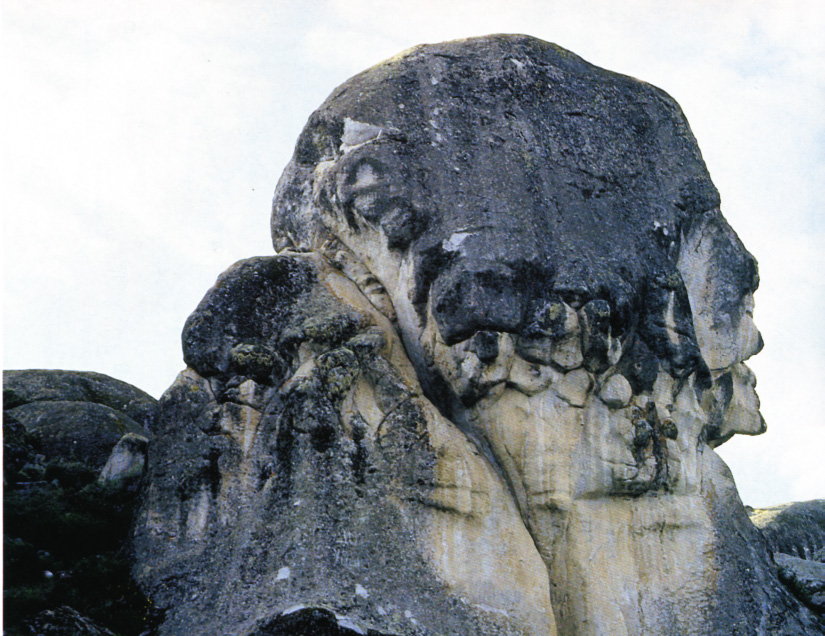
Shape of a human head on Marcahuasi

Marcahuasi (Spanish pronunciation: [maɾkaˈwasi]) is a plateau in the Andes Mountains, located 60 km east of Lima, on the mountain range that rises to the right bank of the Rímac River. The site is located at 4,000 metres (13,000 ft) above sea level and is known for its unusual geological formations; curious shapes of human faces and animals visible in granite rock.

== Research ==
The place was first investigated by Julio Tello in 1922. It was then investigated by Daniel Ruzo during the 1950s and in an area of about 3 km^{2}, several hundred curious shapes are found, which can be presumed as natural formations. The place is located at a height of about 12,500 feet (3,800 m) in the Andes Mountains.

== Features ==
The plateau originated from a volcanic reaction. It is about 4 square kilometres (1 1/2 sq mi) in area, and sits at an elevation of almost 4,000 metres (13,000 ft) in Huarochirí Province, east of Lima, Peru. Marcahuasi is home to a unique set of huge granite rocks with curious shapes resembling human faces, animals, and religious symbols. There are many theories as to their origins, including the assertion that their unusual shapes formed naturally through erosion. Some argued that they are sculptures shaped by ancient people but archaeologists clearly state that the shapes are the result of erosion over centuries. There are some small pre-Columbian structures, which are tombs of ancient people and some of which are robbed and vandalised.

There is also a collection of ruins on the north side of the plateau. Over 50 structures stand in varying states of decay. The doorways are very small, some three feet high. Most of the structures are narrow since the use of arches was not known, therefore spans had to be covered with suitable rock that may have been quarried locally. There are also what appear to be burial tombs on the outskirts of the settlement.

== Gallery ==
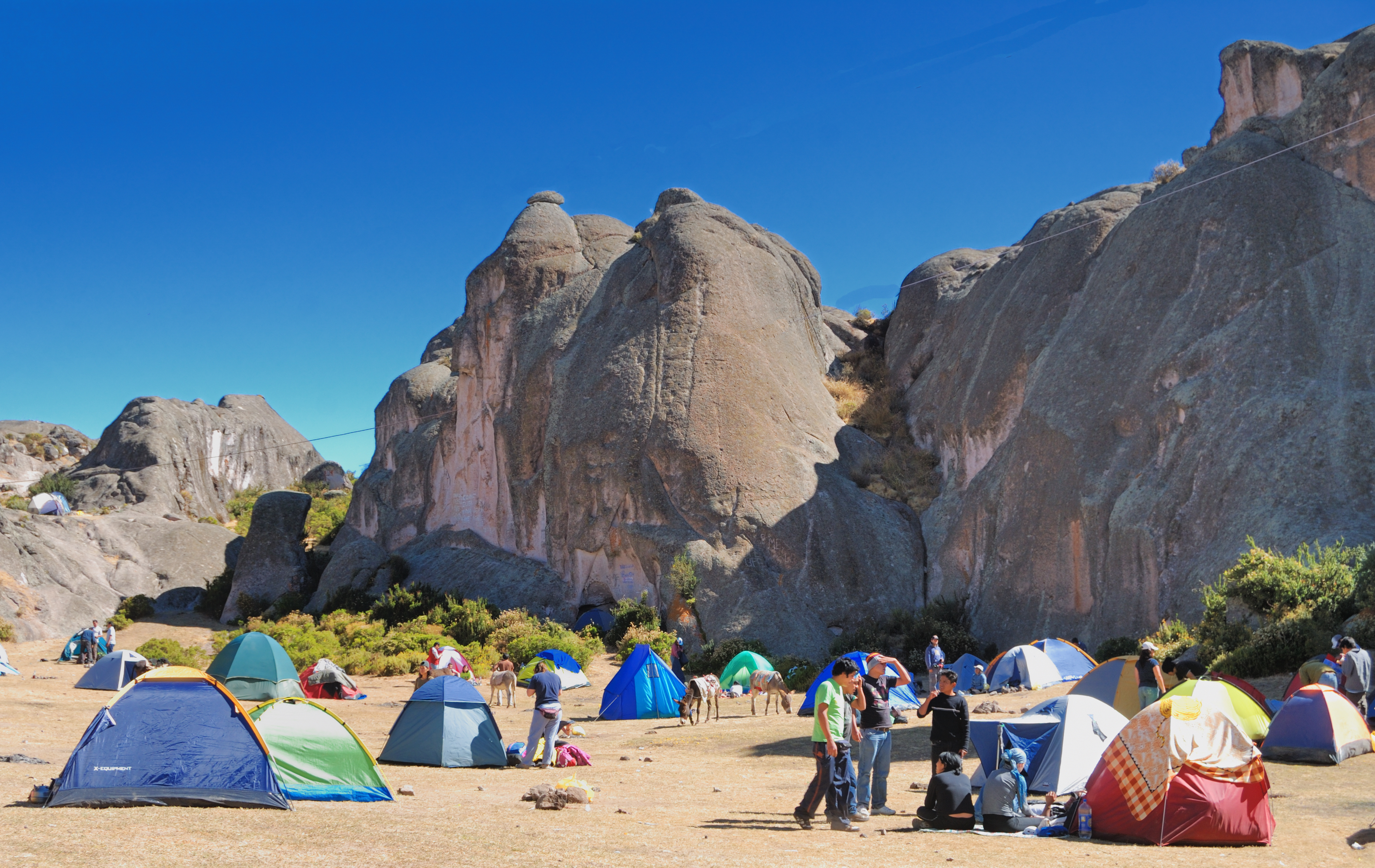
Another view, with the camping zone

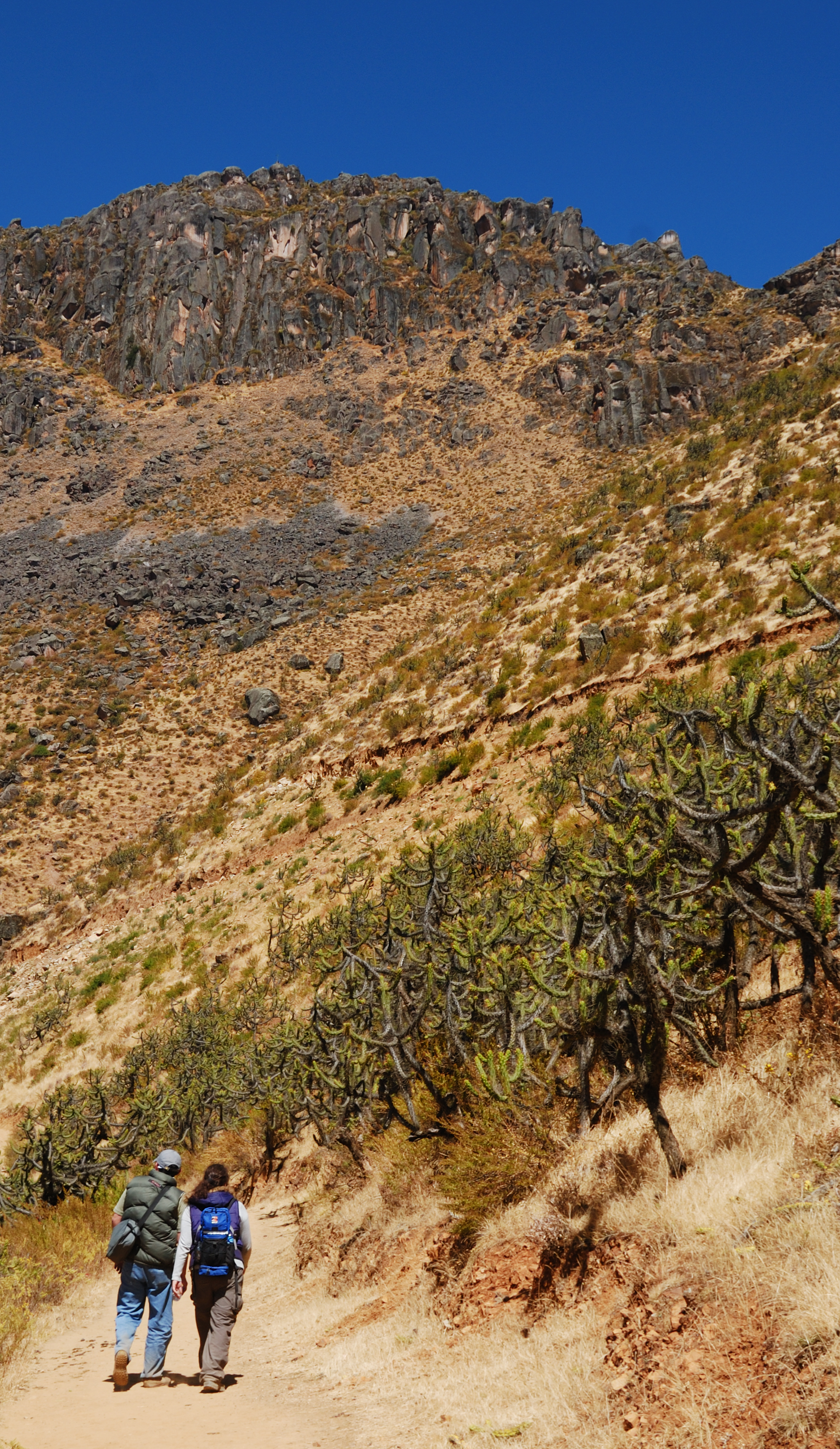
The high lands and the road to the plateau

== See also ==
- Badlands Guardian a feature that from the air bears a strong resemblance to a human head wearing a full Native American headdress
- 'Face on Mars', photographed by Viking 1 in 1976
- Old Man of the Mountain, rock profile in New Hampshire
- Old Man of Hoy a rock pillar off Scotland that resembles a standing man
- Pareidolia, the phenomena of perceiving faces in random patterns

== Bibliography ==
- Mazzotti Lopez, Daniel (2001). A mochila en Perú (Backpacking in Peru) Peruvian explorers.
- Video: Marcahuasi: Enigmatic Stones in the Peruvian Andes
- Doore, Kathy (2008), Markawasi: Peru's Inexplicable Stone Forest
- Williamson, George Hunt (1973), Road in the Sky
