= Callahuanca District =

Coordinates: 11.8265°S 76.6186°W

Callahuanca Qallawanka
- District
- Interactive map of Callahuanca
- Country: Peru
- Region: Lima
- Province: Huarochirí
- Founded: April 12, 1957
- Capital: Callahuanca

Government
  - Mayor: Martin Roman Lazaro Cuellar (2019-2022)

Area
  - Total: 57.47 km^{2} (22.19 sq mi)
- Elevation: 1,761 m (5,778 ft)

Population (2017)
  - Total: 798
  - Density: 13.9/km^{2} (36.0/sq mi)
- Time zone: UTC-5 (PET)
- UBIGEO: 150703

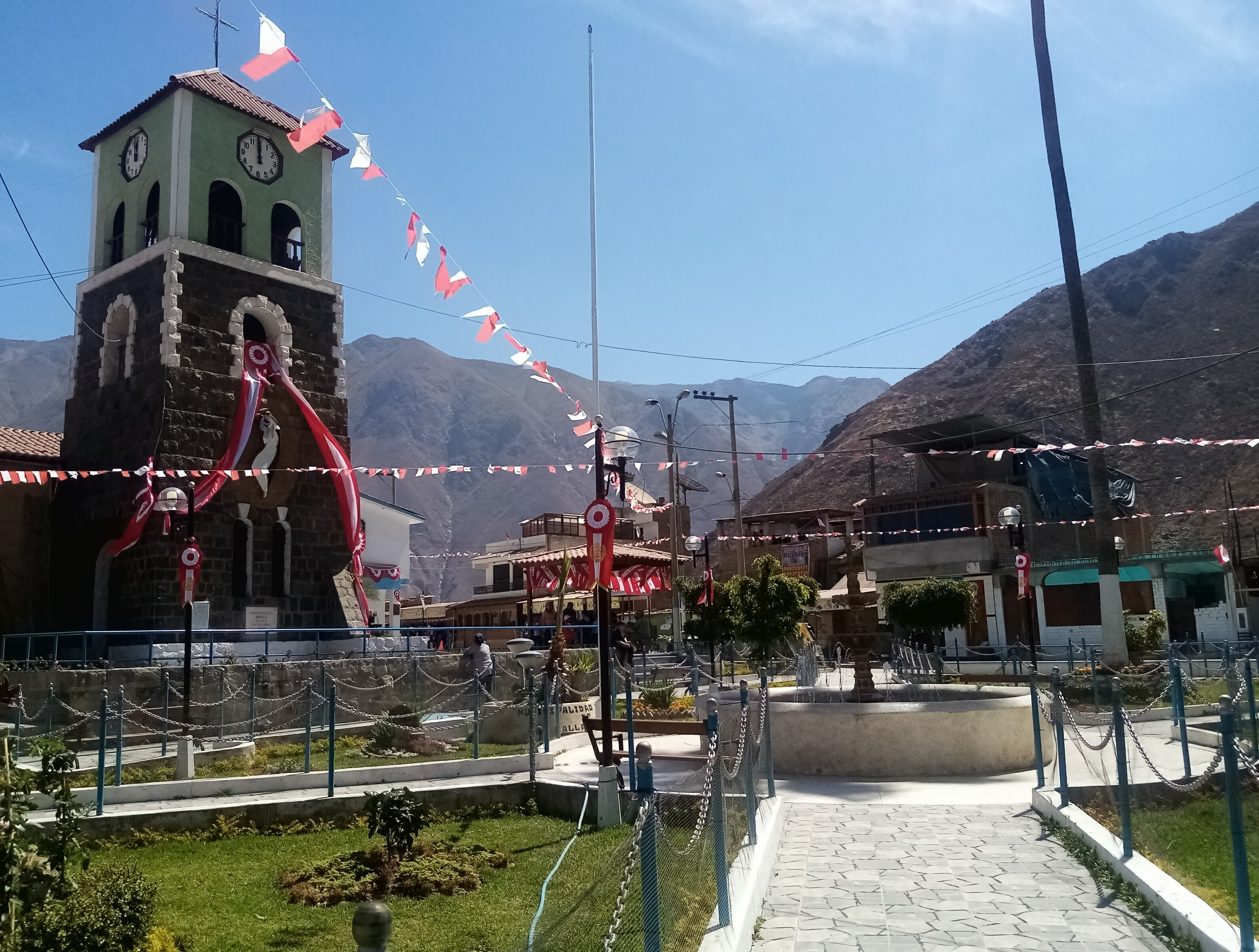
Callahuanca Main Square (2021)

Callahuanca District is one of thirty-two districts of the province Huarochirí in Peru.
