= Qarwa Ranra =

Mountain in Peru

- Location within Peru

Highest point
- Elevation: 5,000 m (16,000 ft)
- Coordinates: 11°42′00″S 76°20′19″W

Geography
- Location: Peru, Lima Region
- Parent range: Andes

Qarwa Ranra (Quechua qarwa pale, yellowish, golden, "yellowish stony ground", hispanicized spelling Carhuaranra) is a mountain in the La Viuda mountain range in the Andes of Peru, about 5,000 metres (16,404 ft) high. It is situated in the Lima Region, Huarochirí Province, on the border of the districts of Carampoma and Matucana. It lies northwest of Yana Yana.
