= Mariatana District =

Coordinates: 12.2372°S 76.3258°W

Mariatana
- District
- Interactive map of Mariatana
- Country: Peru
- Region: Lima
- Province: Huarochirí
- Founded: October 11, 1954
- Capital: Mariatana

Government
  - Mayor: Over Lorenzo Santos Reyes

Area
  - Total: 168.63 km^{2} (65.11 sq mi)
- Elevation: 3,534 m (11,594 ft)

Population (2005 census)
  - Total: 1,606
  - Density: 9.524/km^{2} (24.67/sq mi)
- Time zone: UTC-5 (PET)
- UBIGEO: 150713

Mariatana District is one of thirty-two districts of the province Huarochirí in Peru.
