= Laraos District, Huarochirí =

Coordinates: 11.6646°S 76.5400°W

Laraos Laraw
- District
- Interactive map of Laraos
- Country: Peru
- Region: Lima
- Province: Huarochirí
- Founded: December 4, 1964
- Capital: Laraos

Government
  - Mayor: Saturnino Fabian Gabriel Gaspar

Area
  - Total: 104.51 km^{2} (40.35 sq mi)
- Elevation: 3,660 m (12,010 ft)

Population (2005 census)
  - Total: 269
  - Density: 2.57/km^{2} (6.67/sq mi)
- Time zone: UTC-5 (PET)
- UBIGEO: 150712

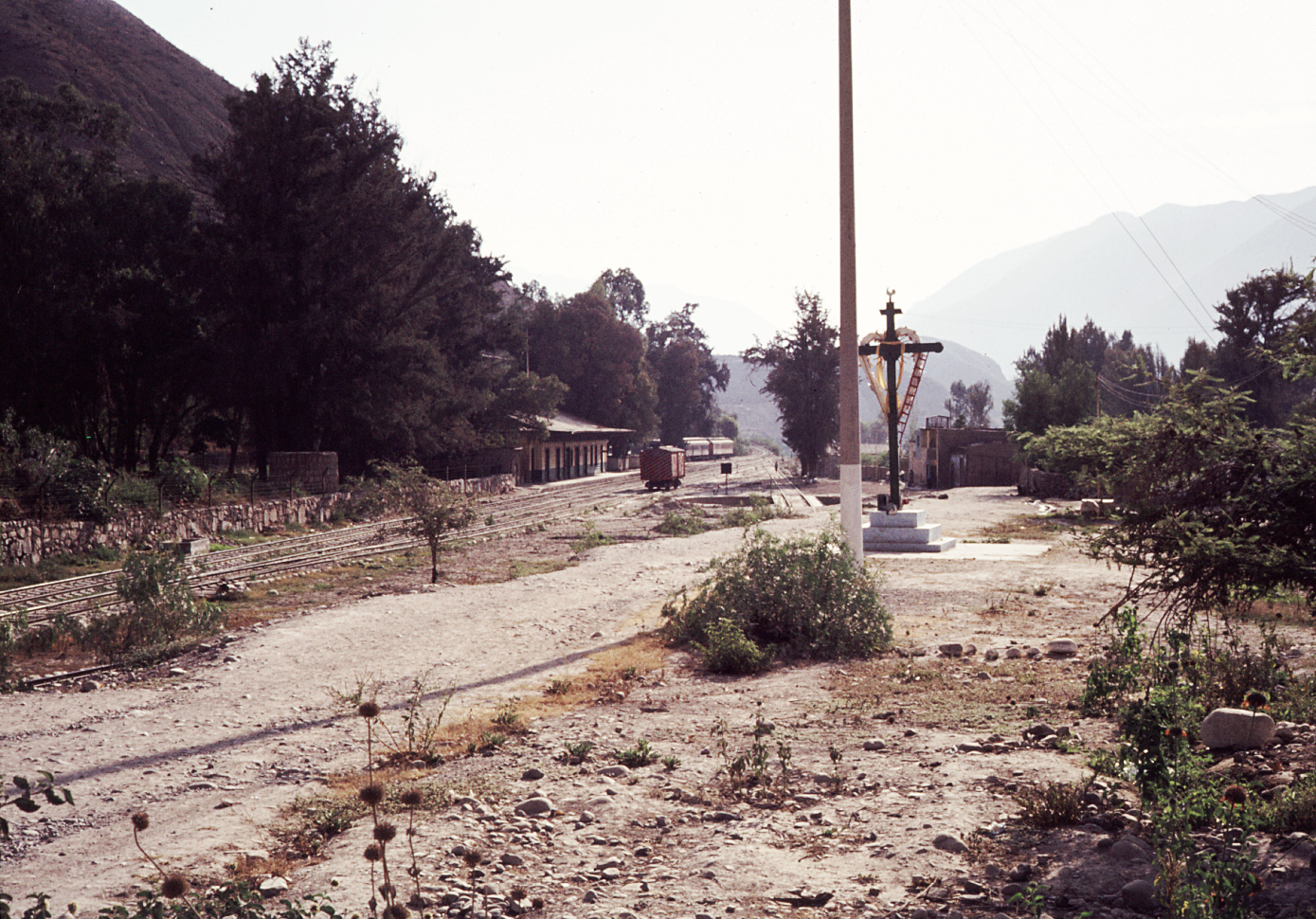
Train station near Matucana in Huarochirí

Laraos District is one of thirty-two districts of the province Huarochirí in Peru.

== See also ==
- Qiwllaqucha
- Raqray
- Tarapu
