= Tarapu =

Mountain in Peru

- Location within Peru

Highest point
- Elevation: 5,000 m (16,000 ft)
- Coordinates: 11°29′12″S 76°30′40″W

Geography
- Location: Peru, Lima Region
- Parent range: Andes

Tarapu (Aymara for clusia pachamamae used in religious ceremonies (incense), Hispanicized spelling Tarapo) is a mountain in the Andes of Peru which reaches an altitude of approximately 5,000 metres (16,404 ft). It is located in the Lima Region, Canta Province, Canta District, and in the Huarochirí Province, Laraos District. Tarapu lies southwest of a lake named Qiwllaqucha (Quechua for "gull lake").
