= San Juan de Tantaranche District =

Coordinates: 12.1135°S 76.1826°W

San Juan de Tantaranche Tantaranchi
- District
- Interactive map of San Juan de Tantaranche
- Country: Peru
- Region: Lima
- Province: Huarochirí
- Founded: February 16, 1962
- Capital: San Juan de Tantaranche

Government
  - Mayor: Nolberto Villa Huaringa

Area
  - Total: 137.16 km^{2} (52.96 sq mi)
- Elevation: 3,436 m (11,273 ft)

Population (2005 census)
  - Total: 570
  - Density: 4.2/km^{2} (11/sq mi)
- Time zone: UTC-5 (PET)
- UBIGEO: 150720

San Juan de Tantaranche District is one of thirty-two districts of the province Huarochirí in Peru.

== See also ==
- Waqaypaka
