= Chunta (Junín-Lima) =

Mountain in Peru

- Location within Peru

Highest point
- Elevation: 5,208 m (17,087 ft)
- Coordinates: 11°29′47″S 76°22′38″W

Geography
- Location: Peru, Junín Region, Lima Region
- Parent range: Andes

Chunta (Aymara for prolonged, lengthened, Quechua for a kind of palm, Hispanicized name La Chonta) is a 5,208-metre-high (17,087 ft) mountain in the Andes of Peru. It is located in the Junín Region, Yauli Province, Marcapomacocha District, and in the Lima Region, Canta Province, Huaros District, and in the Huarochirí Province, Huanza District. It lies northwest of Kashpi.
