= Qullqayuq =

Mountain in Peru

- Location within Peru

Highest point
- Elevation: 5,100 m (16,700 ft)
- Coordinates: 11°51′5″S 76°6′49″W

Geography
- Location: Peru, Lima Region
- Parent range: Andes, Cordillera Central

Qullqayuq (Quechua qullqa, deposit, storehouse, -yuq a suffix to indicate ownership, "the one with a deposit", Hispanicized spelling Culcayoc) is a mountain in the Cordillera Central in the Andes of Peru, about 5,100 metres (16,732 ft) high. It is situated in the Lima Region, Huarochiri Province, San Mateo District. Qullqayuq lies south of Quri, southwest of the lake named Wallaqucha and northwest of Qarwachuku of the Paryaqaqa or Waruchiri mountain range.
