= San Damian District =

Coordinates: 12.0174°S 76.3918°W

San Damian
- District
- Interactive map of San Damian
- Country: Peru
- Region: Lima
- Province: Huarochirí
- Capital: San Damian

Government
  - Mayor: Eder Pinaud Ochoa

Area
  - Total: 343.22 km^{2} (132.52 sq mi)
- Elevation: 3,235 m (10,614 ft)

Population (2005 census)
  - Total: 1,733
  - Density: 5.049/km^{2} (13.08/sq mi)
- Time zone: UTC-5 (PET)
- UBIGEO: 150718

San Damian District is one of thirty-two districts of the Huarochirí Province in Peru.

== Geography ==
One of the highest peaks of the district is Uqhu at 5,262 m (17,264 ft). Other mountains are listed below:

- Mulli
- Pampa Kachi
- Qiñwa
- Rukutu
- Suyruqucha
- Uqhu
- Utush Mikhunan
- Wamanripa
- Willka Pampa
