= Lahuaytambo District =

Coordinates: 12.0965°S 76.3889°W

Lahuaytambo Lawaytampu
- District
- Interactive map of Lahuaytambo
- Country: Peru
- Region: Lima
- Province: Huarochirí
- Founded: December 31, 1943
- Capital: Lahuaytambo

Government
  - Mayor: Tomas Oscar Belen Naupa

Area
  - Total: 81.88 km^{2} (31.61 sq mi)
- Elevation: 3,338 m (10,951 ft)

Population (2005 census)
  - Total: 803
  - Density: 9.81/km^{2} (25.4/sq mi)
- Time zone: UTC-5 (PET)
- UBIGEO: 150710
- Website: munilahuaytambo.gob.pe

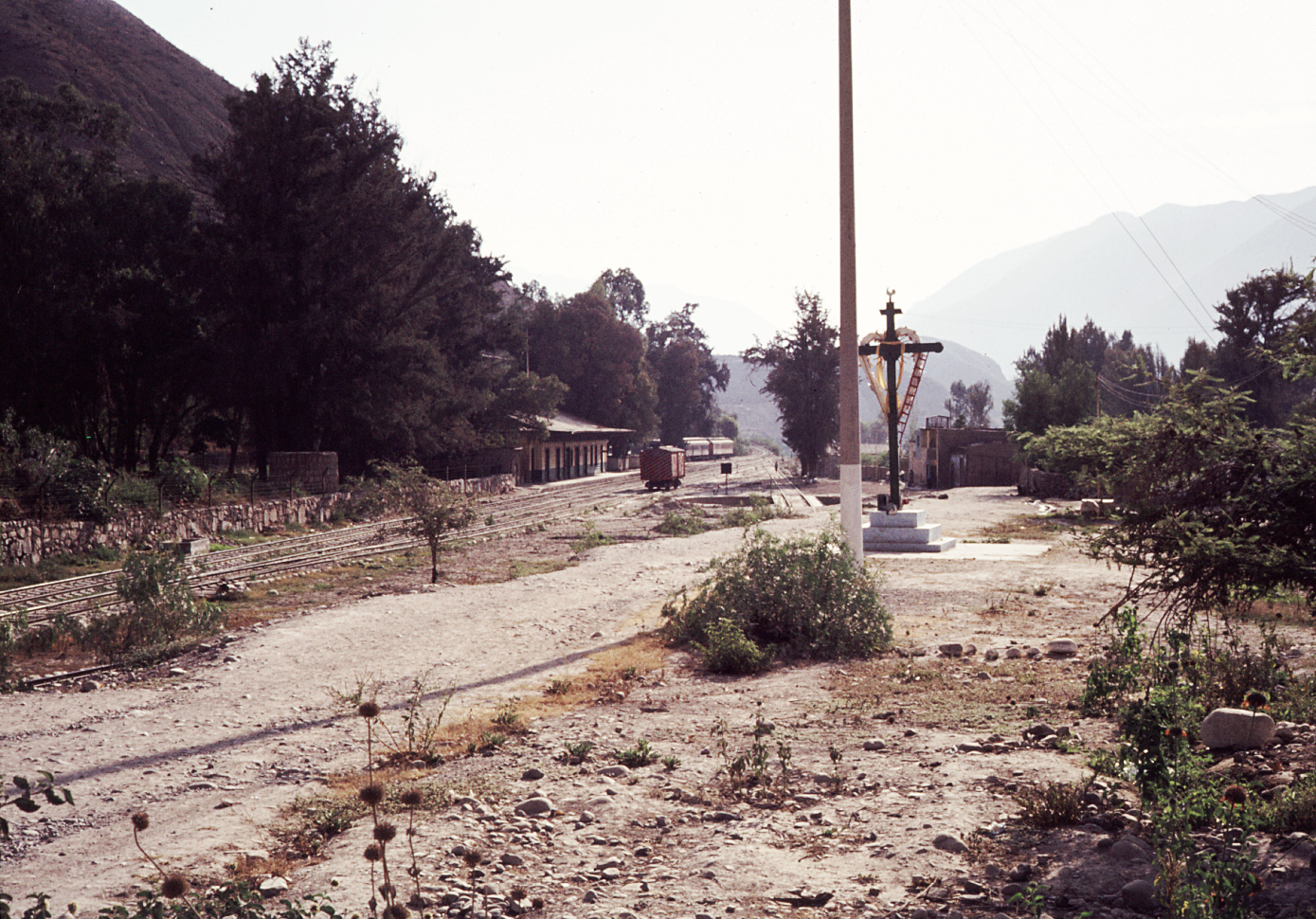

Lahuaytambo District is one of thirty-two districts of the province Huarochirí in Peru.
