= Wamanripa (Carampoma) =

Mountain in Peru

- Location within Peru

Highest point
- Elevation: 4,600 m (15,100 ft)
- Coordinates: 11°39′43″S 76°22′36″W

Geography
- Location: Peru, Lima Region
- Parent range: Andes

Wamanripa (Quechua wamanripa Senecio, "the one with the wamanripa", also spelled Huamanripa) is a mountain in the Andes of Peru which reaches an altitude of approximately 4,600 metres (15,092 ft). It is located in the Lima Region, Huarochirí Province, Carampoma District. Wamanripa lies southeast of Wamanripayuq.
