= Santiago de Tuna District =

Coordinates: 11°59′06″S 76°31′39″W

Santiago de Tuna
- District
- Interactive map of Santiago de Tuna
- Country: Peru
- Region: Lima
- Province: Huarochirí
- Founded: December 31, 1943
- Capital: Santiago de Tuna

Government
  - Mayor: Bacilia Marcelina Perez Marcos

Area
  - Total: 54.25 km^{2} (20.95 sq mi)
- Elevation: 2,902 m (9,521 ft)

Population (2017)
  - Total: 411
  - Density: 7.58/km^{2} (19.6/sq mi)
- Time zone: UTC-5 (PET)
- UBIGEO: 150730

Santiago de Tuna District is one of thirty-two districts of the province Huarochirí in Peru.
