= San Pedro de Casta District =

Coordinates: 11°45′30″S 76°35′56″W

San Pedro de Casta
- District
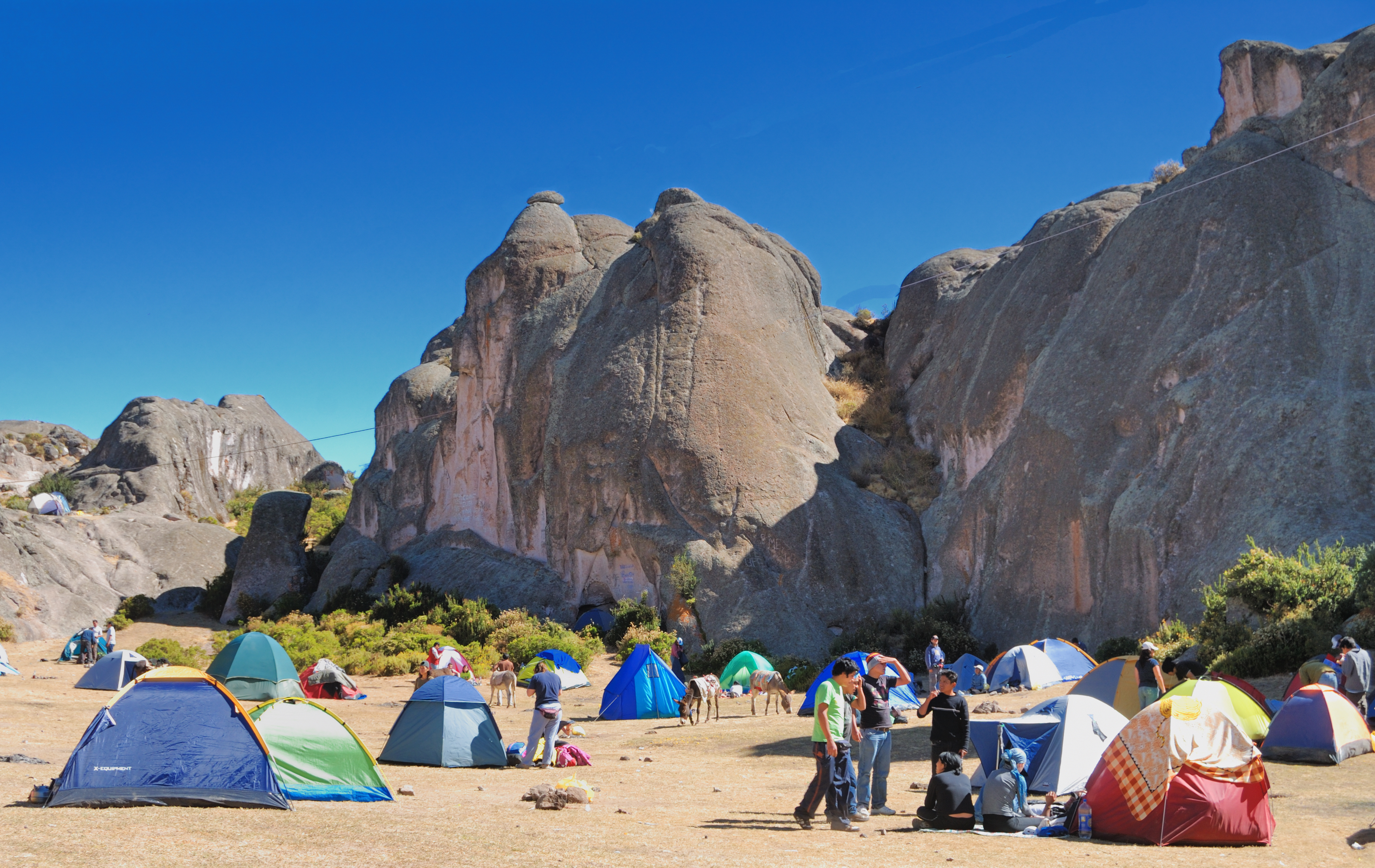
- Tourists at Markawasi
- Interactive map of San Pedro de Casta
- Country: Peru
- Region: Lima
- Province: Huarochirí
- Capital: San Pedro de Casta

Government
  - Mayor: Castulo Liberto Obispo Bautista

Area
  - Total: 79.91 km^{2} (30.85 sq mi)
- Elevation: 3,180 m (10,430 ft)

Population (2005 census)
  - Total: 999
  - Density: 12.5/km^{2} (32.4/sq mi)
- Time zone: UTC-5 (PET)
- UBIGEO: 150724

San Pedro de Casta District is one of thirty-two districts of the province Huarochirí in Peru. The town of San Pedro de Casta is known for its proximity to Marcahuasi, and receives the majority of its attention from this tourist attraction. Nevertheless, over the 20th century the town has attracted significant academic interest, largely due to its traditional annual week-long canal-cleaning ritual carried out every October. More recent research has focused on historical aspects of this ritual; Casta is home to the early twentieth-century Entablo Manuscript, which describes Casta's ritual water laws in predominantly Spanish language from a local point of view. Scholars have drawn comparisons between the 'Entablo' and the Quechua language early colonial Huarochirí Manuscript from the same Peruvian province.

== Access ==
To get to San Pedro de Casta, one must travel to Chosica and catch a bus. Directly off the western side of the main street of Chosica is a small market where one can find many buses. A bus labeled Marcahuasi or Casta will take travelers and market-goers through the valley heading north out of town to San Pedro de Casta (expect to catch the bus an hour before it is supposed to leave, because spaces can fill up quickly on the buses). Three to four hours later, the bus will arrive in San Pedro de Casta. In San Pedro de Casta there is one hotel and three restaurants off of the main square where tourists can stay and buy meals. A few guides and horse owners live near the main square and, if asked, will accommodate travelers' schedules for a reasonable price.

San Pedro de Casta comes alive for travelers who love a good festival. Centered around patron saint feast days and national holidays, the town hosts vibrant celebrations where live bands keep the music and energy going straight through the night.^{[source?]}

The best time to visit is during the months of June to October, this is the region's time for winter and its dry season.
