= Millpu (Huarochirí) =

Mountain in Peru

- Location within Peru

Highest point
- Elevation: 5,238 m (17,185 ft)
- Coordinates: 11°38′06″S 76°18′06″W

Geography
- Location: Peru, Ayacucho Region,
- Parent range: Andes

Millpu (Quechua for "throat, gullet", also spelled Millpo) is a mountain in the Andes of Peru, about 5,238 metres (17,185 ft) high. It is located in the Lima Region, Huarochiri Province, in the districts of Carampoma and Chicla. Millpu lies northeast of Wachwa (Quechua for "Andean goose", also spelled Huachhua) and southeast of a lake named Wachwaqucha (Quechua for "Andean goose lake", also spelled Huachuguacocha).
