= Kiwyu (Huarochirí) =

Mountain in Peru

- Location within Peru

Highest point
- Elevation: 4,800 m (15,700 ft)
- Coordinates: 11°29′45″S 76°28′16″W

Geography
- Location: Peru, Lima Region
- Parent range: Andes

Kiwyu (Jaqaru for a kind of partridges, hispanicized spelling Quiuyo) is a mountain in the Andes of Peru which reaches an altitude of approximately 4,800 metres (15,748 ft). It is located in the Lima Region, Huarochirí Province, Huanza District. Kiwyu lies northwest of a lake named Saqsaqucha (Quechua for "multi-colored lake").
