= Mike Cuenca =

American filmmaker

- Born: Westminster, CA
- Occupations: Filmmaker, musician
- Years active: 2008–present

Mike Cuenca is a Cuban-American film director, producer, screenwriter, editor and musician. He was born in Westminster, California. He began directing in 2008 and has worked on feature films, shorts and music videos.

== Music and podcast work ==
Cuenca fronted the Los Angeles post-punk band Dignitary and later recorded with the band Some Daggers Wear Red.

In 2026, Cuenca became video producer for The American Cinematheque Podcast.

== Filmography ==
=== Film ===
Year	Title	Role
2011	Jerry Powell & the Delusions of Grandeur	Director, writer, co-producer, editor
2012	By the Wayside	Director, story, co-producer, editor, actor
2018–2025	Boys About Town #1, #2, #3, & #4	Director, writer, producer, editor, composer, actor
2020	I'll Be Around	Director, co-writer, producer, editor, composer, actor
2021	Like a Dirty French Novel	Director, co-writer, producer, editor, composer, actor
2024	Watch Them Come Blood	Director, co-writer, producer, editor, composer, actor
2024	In the Ditch	Director, co-writer, producer, editor, composer,
2026	Odium for Ardor	Director, writer, producer, editor, composer, actor

=== Shorts ===
Year	Title	Role
2008	Scenes from Oblivion	Director, writer, producer, editor
2012	Sad Bastard Hero	Director, story, co-producer, editor

=== Music Videos ===
Year	Title	Role
2012	Spirit Vine, "Cold Living"	Director, editor
2014	Dignitary, "Demon Beside Me"	Director, editor, performer, composer
2015	Dignitary, "Destiny's False Turn"	Director, editor, performer, composer
2016	Dignitary, "Bricella's Highway"	Director, editor, performer, composer
2018	Illuminati Sex Party, "Meat New People"	Director, editor
