= San Pedro de Huancayre District =

Coordinates: 12.1298°S 76.2154°W

San Pedro de Huancayre
- District
- Interactive map of San Pedro de Huancayre
- Country: Peru
- Region: Lima
- Province: Huarochirí
- Founded: May 15, 1962
- Capital: San Pedro

Government
  - Mayor: Felix Macavilca Zacarias

Area
  - Total: 41.75 km^{2} (16.12 sq mi)
- Elevation: 3,135 m (10,285 ft)

Population (2005 census)
  - Total: 249
  - Density: 5.96/km^{2} (15.4/sq mi)
- Time zone: UTC-5 (PET)
- UBIGEO: 150725

San Pedro de Huancayre District is one of thirty-two districts of the province Huarochirí in Peru.
