= Huachupampa District =

Coordinates: 11.7209°S 76.5883°W

Huachupampa Wachupampa
- District
- Interactive map of Huachupampa
- Country: Peru
- Region: Lima
- Province: Huarochirí
- Founded: July 24, 1964
- Capital: Huachupampa (San Lorenzo de Huachupampa)

Government
  - Mayor: Edson Heber Lopez Valdez (2019-2022)

Area
  - Total: 76.02 km^{2} (29.35 sq mi)
- Elevation: 2,920 m (9,580 ft)

Population (2017)
  - Total: 609
  - Density: 8.01/km^{2} (20.7/sq mi)
- Time zone: UTC-5 (PET)
- UBIGEO: 150707

Huachupampa District is one of thirty-two districts of the province Huarochirí in Peru.

== See also ==
- Antaqucha
