= Wamp'arqucha =

Lake in Peru

- Location within Peru
- Location: Lima Region
- Coordinates: 11°36′50″S 76°19′31″W
- Basin countries: Peru

Wamp'arqucha (Quechua wamp'ar tripod, Wamp'ar a neighboring mountain qucha lake, "tripod lake" or "Wamp'ar lake", Hispanicized spelling Huamparcocha) is a lake in Peru located in the Lima Region, Huarochiri Province, Carampoma District. It lies northeast of Wachwaqucha at a mountain named Wamp'ar.

== See also ==
- List of lakes in Peru
