= Quri (Lima-Junín) =

Mountain in the Andes of Peru

- Location within Peru

Highest point
- Elevation: 5,200 m (17,100 ft)
- Coordinates: 11°48′47″S 76°6′46″W

Geography
- Location: Peru, Lima Region, Junín Region
- Parent range: Andes, Cordillera Central

Quri (Quechua for gold, Hispanicized spelling Juri) is a mountain in the Cordillera Central in the Andes of Peru, about 5,200 metres (17,060 ft) high. It is situated in the Lima Region, Huarochiri Province, San Mateo District, and in the Junín Region, Yauli Province, Yauli District. Quri lies west of the main branch of the Paryaqaqa or Waruchiri mountain range, southwest of a lake named Wallaqucha (Huallacocha).
