= San Mateo de Otao District =

Coordinates: 11°50′51″S 76°33′46″W

San Mateo de Otao Utaw
- District
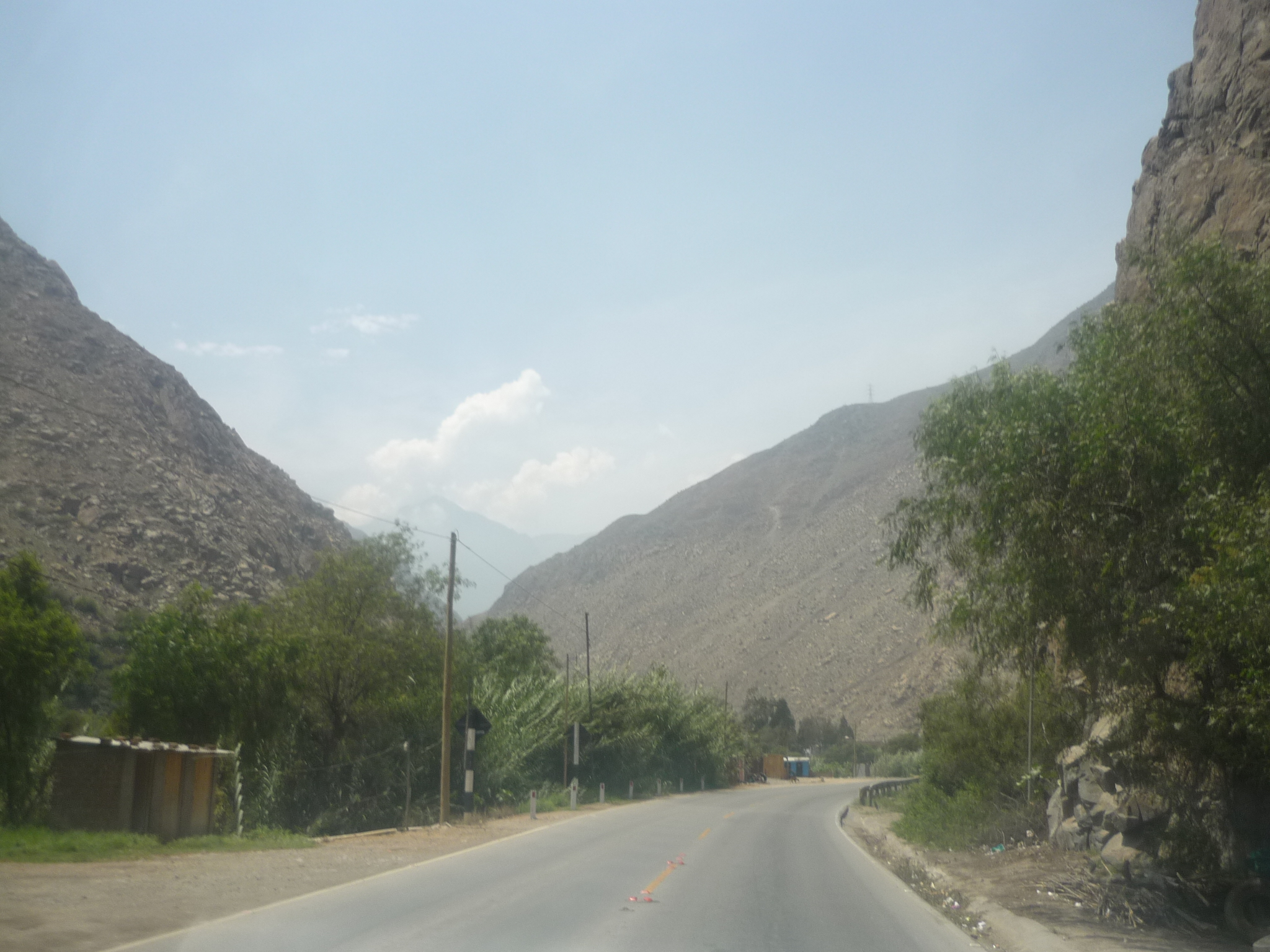
- A road in the outskirts of the district
- Interactive map of San Mateo de Otao
- Country: Peru
- Region: Lima
- Province: Huarochirí
- Founded: November 7, 1944
- Capital: San Juan de Lanca

Government
  - Mayor: Ysneyder Abdiel Espiritu (2019-2022)

Area
  - Total: 12,391 km^{2} (4,784 sq mi)
- Elevation: 2,259 m (7,411 ft)

Population (2017)
  - Total: 1,335
  - Density: 1,896/km^{2} (4,910/sq mi)
- Time zone: UTC-5 (PET)

San Mateo de Otao is one of the 32 districts of the Huarochirí Province in the Lima Region. The district was created by order of the law Nº 10001 on November 7, 1944 and its capital is San Juan de Lanca. It has 7 villages:

- San Juan de Lanca
- Santo Toribio de Cumbe
- San Miguel de Tapicara
- Santa Cruz de Ucro
- Los Milagros de Salpín
- Santa Rosa de Canchacalla
- San Mateo de Otao

San Mateo de Otao District has some few tourist attractions: El Kurimakas, The ruins of Marca-marca, the ruins of Huarichaca, and Quinchicocha.

Also it is a district that has many valleys of fruits like chirimoyas, avocados, apples, tumbo, and other fruits.
