= Matucana District =

Coordinates: 11.8447°S 76.3861°W

Matucana
- District
- Interactive map of Matucana
- Country: Peru
- Region: Lima
- Province: Huarochirí
- Capital: Matucana

Government
  - Mayor: Eveling Feliciano Ordoñez (2019-2022)

Area
  - Total: 179.44 km^{2} (69.28 sq mi)
- Elevation: 2,378 m (7,802 ft)

Population (2017)
  - Total: 4,058
  - Density: 22.61/km^{2} (58.57/sq mi)
- Time zone: UTC-5 (PET)
- UBIGEO: 150701

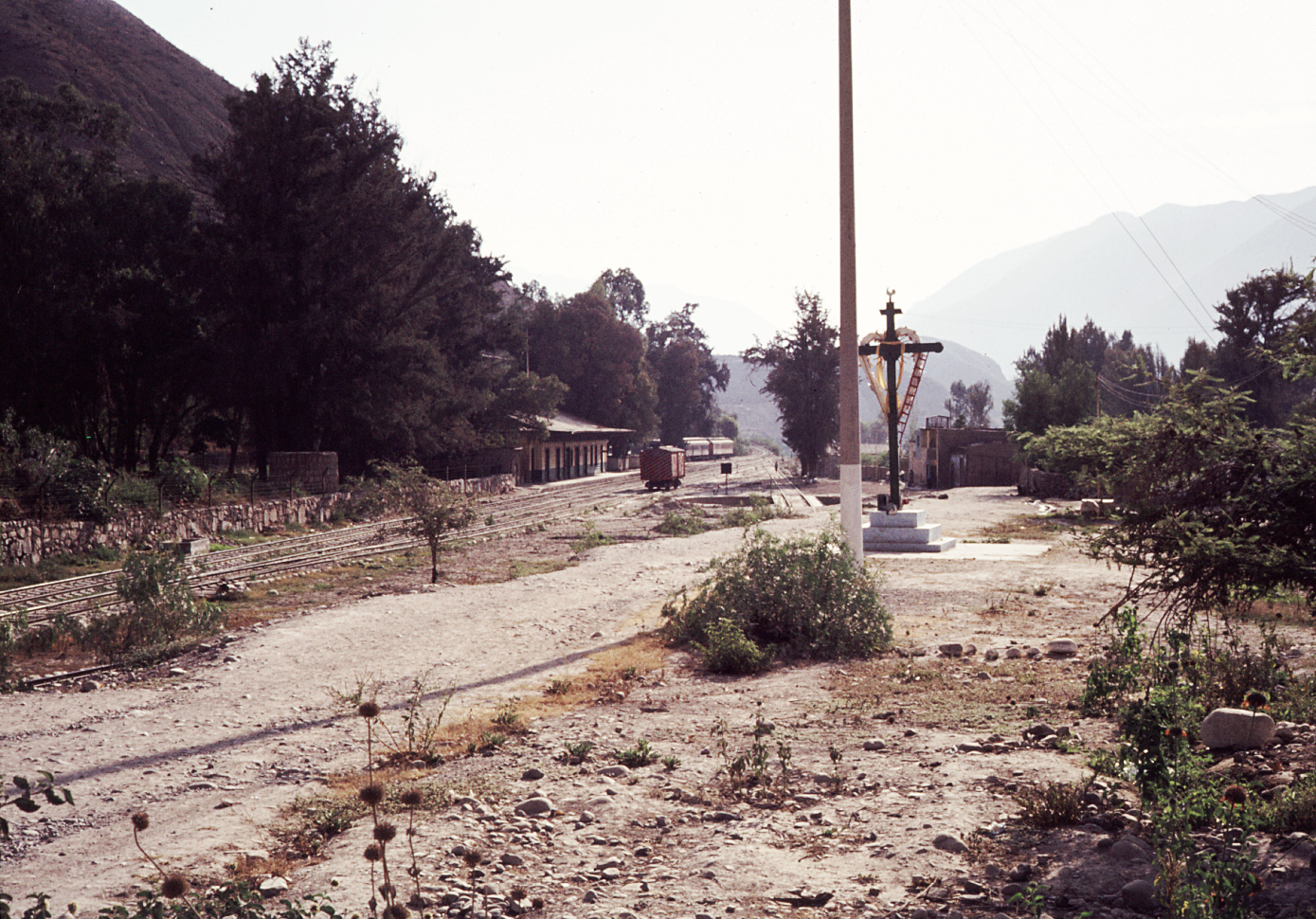
Railroad station near Matucana, Peru, c. 1981

Matucana District is one of thirty-two districts of the Huarochirí Province in Peru.

== Geography ==
One of the highest peaks of the district is Yana Yana at 5,303 m (17,398 ft). Other mountains are listed below:

- Iskay Rumi
- Kawraq
- Latiku
- Link'u
- Ñawin
- Qalla Waylla
- Qarwa Ranra
- Saywa
- Suksu Chaka
- Wachanka
- Waman Qaqa
