= Cuenca District, Huarochirí =

Coordinates: 12.1322°S 76.4353°W

Cuenca District
- District
- Interactive map of Cuenca District
- Country: Peru
- Region: Lima
- Province: Huarochirí
- Founded: April 5, 1935
- Capital: San José de los Chorillos

Government
  - Mayor: Linder Yanavilca Cuellar (2019-2022)

Area
  - Total: 60.02 km^{2} (23.17 sq mi)
- Elevation: 2,780 m (9,120 ft)

Population (2017)
  - Total: 449
  - Density: 7.48/km^{2} (19.4/sq mi)
- Time zone: UTC-5 (PET)
- UBIGEO: 150706

Cuenca District is one of thirty-two districts of the province Huarochirí in Peru.
