= Uyshu =

Mountain in Peru

- Location within Peru

Highest point
- Elevation: 5,038 m (16,529 ft)
- Coordinates: 11°33′20″S 76°27′38″W

Geography
- Location: Peru, Lima Region
- Parent range: Andes

Uyshu (Jaqaru for to liquefy, melt, also spelled Uysho) is a 5,038-metre-high (16,529 ft) mountain in the Andes of Peru. It is situated in the Lima Region, Huarochirí Province, Huanza District. Uyshu lies northeast of Qullqi and southwest of the lakes named P'itiqucha and Saqsaqucha.
