= Pukaqucha (Lima) =

Lake in Lima, Peru

- Location within Peru
- Location: Peru; Lima Region
- Coordinates: 11°31′48″S 76°21′20″W
- Max. length: 1.00 km (0.62 mi)
- Max. width: 0.80 km (0.50 mi)
- Surface elevation: 4,786 m (15,702 ft)

Pukaqucha (Quechua puka red, qucha lake, hispanicized spelling Pucacocha) is a lake in Peru, in the Lima Region, Huarochiri Province, Huanza District. Its elevation is about 4,786 metres (15,702 ft). It is about 1.00 km long and 0.8 km at its widest point.
