= San Mateo District, Huarochirí =

Coordinates: 11.7586°S 76.3000°W

San Mateo
- District
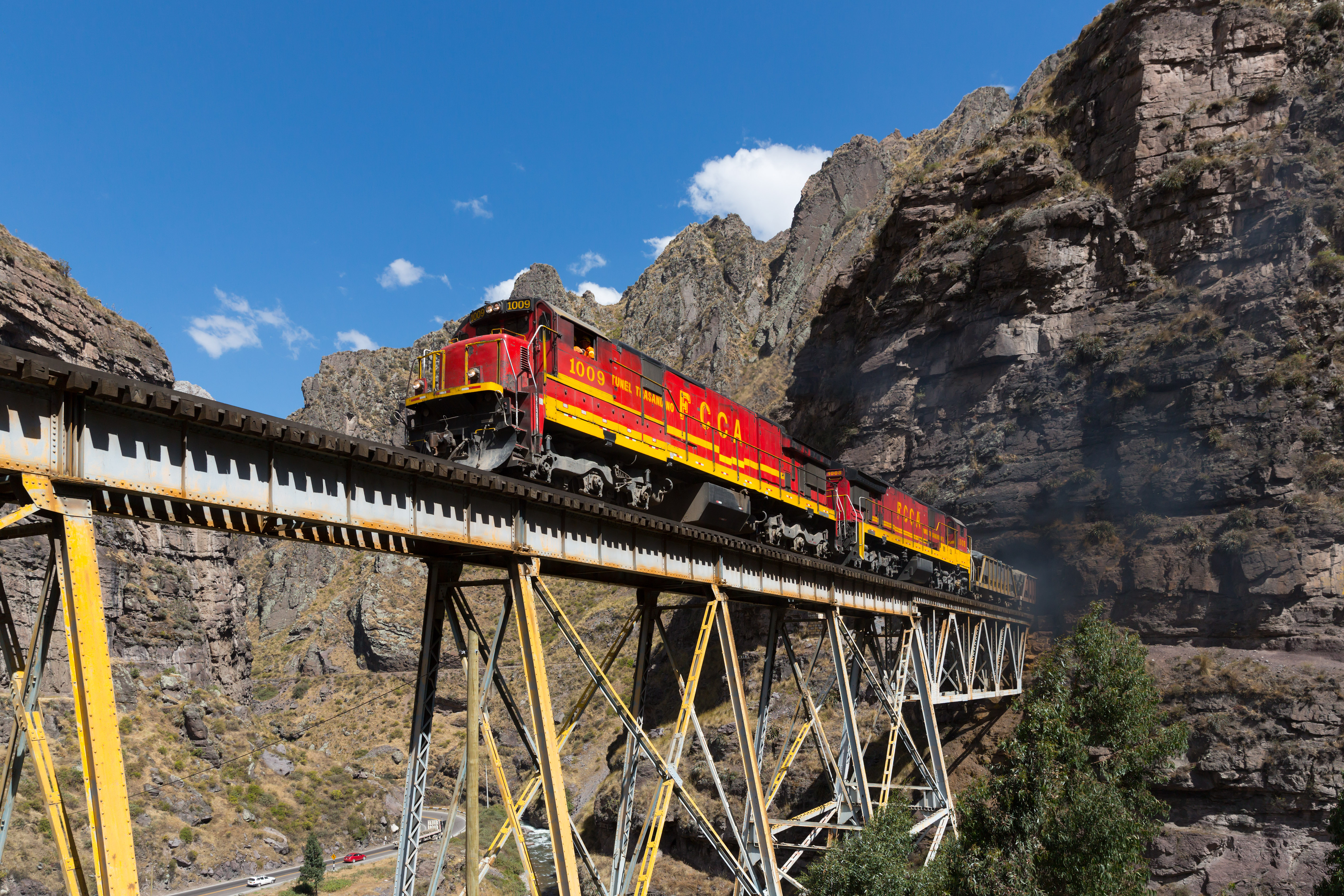
- FCCA (Ferrocarril Central Andino) nrs. 1008 and 1009, two GE C30-7, are crossing a steel bridge between Rio Blanco and San Mateo
- Interactive map of San Mateo
- Country: Peru
- Region: Lima
- Province: Huarochirí
- Capital: San Mateo

Government
  - Mayor: Luis Eduardo Rincon Franco (2019–2022)

Area
  - Total: 425.6 km^{2} (164.3 sq mi)
- Elevation: 3,149 m (10,331 ft)

Population (2017)
  - Total: 4,245
  - Density: 9.974/km^{2} (25.83/sq mi)
- Time zone: UTC-5 (PET)
- UBIGEO: 150722

San Mateo District is one of thirty-two districts of the Huarochirí Province, located in the Department of Lima in Peru. It was one of eleven districts that formed the Huarochirí Province after it was created by decree on August 4, 1821, during the Protectorate of San Martín.

== Geography ==
The La Viuda and the Paryaqaqa or Waruchiri mountain ranges traverse the district. Some of the highest mountains of the district are listed below:

- Allqa Allqa
- Chinchiqucha
- Chunta
- Kunkus Yantaq
- Llipina
- Mankan
- Ñuñu
- Paqcha
- Pachanqutu
- Paka
- Qullqayuq
- Quri
- Sarayuq
- Shiraq
- Suyruqucha
- Tata Qayqu
- Uqhu
- Uqsha Wallqa
- Utush Mikhunan
- Wamanripa
- Waskha
- Yana Qaqa
- Yana Yana
- Yuraq Anka (Junín-Lima)
- Yuraq Anka (Lima)
- Yawriq

== See also ==
- Yuraqmayu
