= Santa Eulalia District =

Coordinates: 11.9012°S 76.6641°W

Santa Eulalia
- District
- Interactive map of Santa Eulalia
- Country: Peru
- Region: Lima
- Province: Huarochirí
- Capital: Santa Eulalia

Government
  - Mayor: Pedro William Gomez Gutarra (2019-2022)

Area
  - Total: 111.12 km^{2} (42.90 sq mi)
- Elevation: 1,036 m (3,399 ft)

Population (2017)
  - Total: 12,636
  - Density: 113.71/km^{2} (294.52/sq mi)
- Time zone: UTC-5 (PET)
- UBIGEO: 150728

Santa Eulalia District is one of thirty-two districts of the province Huarochirí in Peru.
