= Wamanripa (Huarochirí-San Damian) =

Mountain in the Andes of Peru

- Location within Peru

Highest point
- Elevation: 5,000 m (16,000 ft)
- Coordinates: 11°57′30″S 76°14′40″W

Geography
- Location: Peru, Lima Region
- Parent range: Andes, Cordillera Central

Wamanripa (local name for Senecio or a species of it, also applied for Laccopetalum giganteum, Hispanicized spelling Huamanripa) is a mountain in the Cordillera Central in the Andes of Peru, about 5,000 metres (16,404 ft) high. It is situated in the Lima Region, Huarochirí Province, on the border of the districts of Huarochirí and San Damian. It lies west of a lake named Chumpiqucha (Chumpicocha).

The intermittent stream of the Wamanripa valley on the southern side of the mountain flows to Mala River.
