= Huarochirí province =

Province of Peru

Coordinates: 11.844682°S 76.383777°W

Huarochirí
- Province
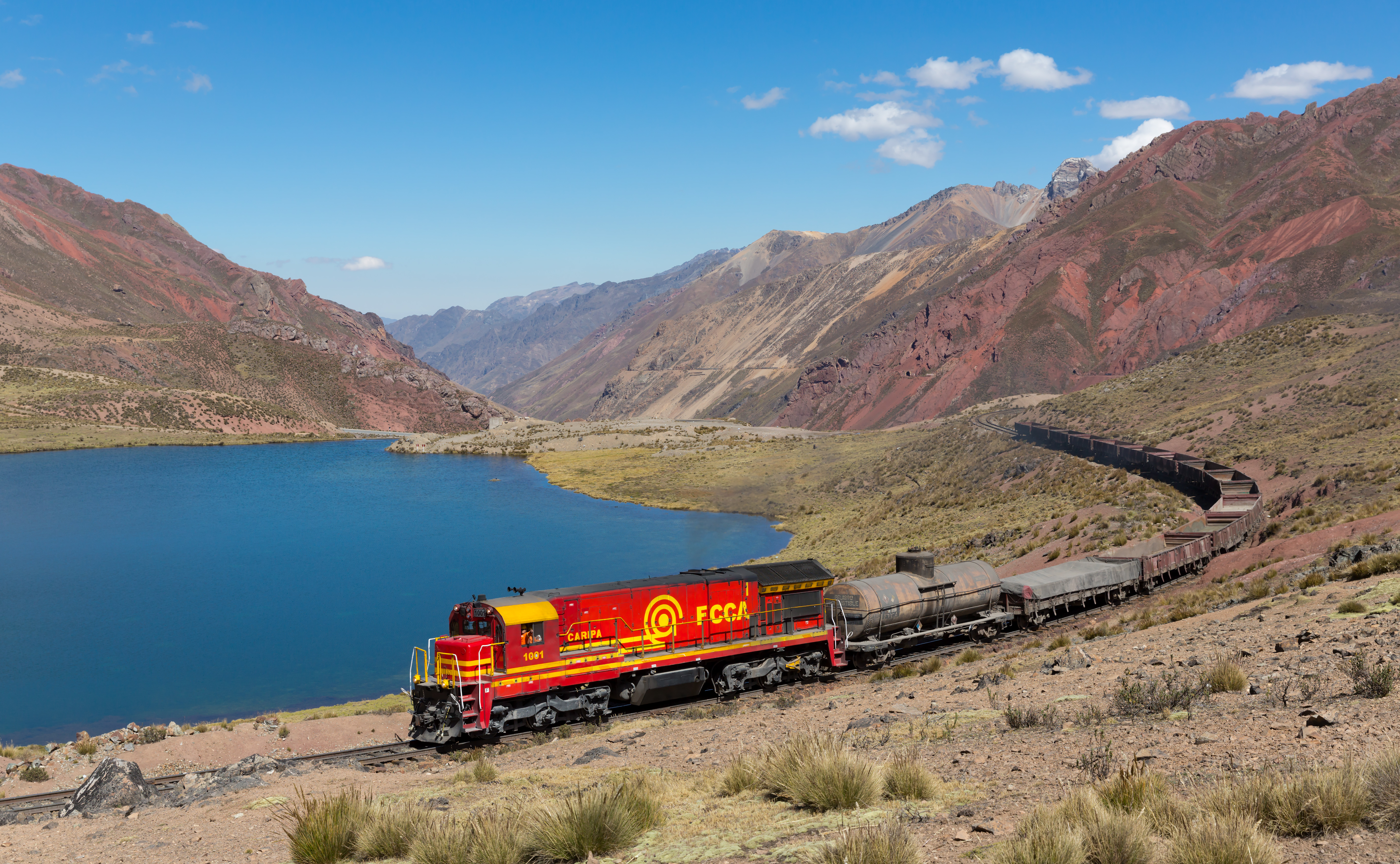
- The train from Lima to La Oroya between Chinchan and the Antikuna pass

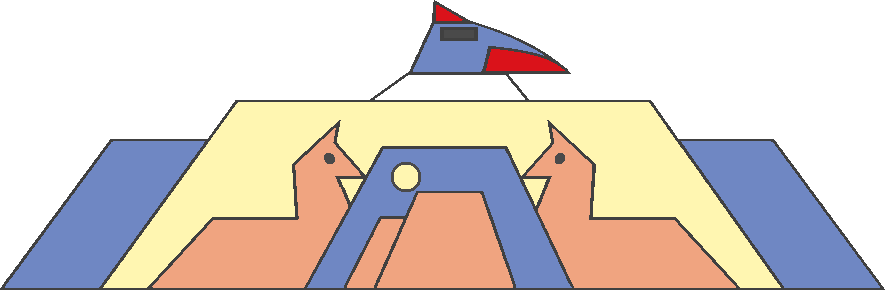
- Coat of arms

- Location of Huarochirí in Lima
- Country: Peru
- Department: Lima
- Capital: Matucana

Government
  - Mayor: Hugo González (2023-2026)

Area
  - Total: 5,657.93 km^{2} (2,184.54 sq mi)
- Elevation: 2,378 m (7,802 ft)

Population
  - Total: 58,145
  - Density: 10.277/km^{2} (26.617/sq mi)
- UBIGEO: 1507

Huarochirí (Quechua: Waruchiri) is a province of the department of Lima, Peru. From the administrative point of view of the Catholic Church in Peru, it forms part of the Territorial Prelature of Yauyos. Its capital is Matucana. The western section is part of the Lima Metropolitan Area.

== Geography ==
The La Viuda and Paryaqaqa or Waruchiri mountain ranges and the Cordillera de la Corte traverse the province. One of the highest peaks of the province is Paryaqaqa at 5,750 metres (18,865 ft) above sea level. Other mountains are listed below:

- Allqa Allqa
- Anta Q'asa
- Anta Ranra
- Antapampa
- Antikuna
- Awqa Pallqa
- Chakraqucha
- Chinchiqucha
- Chumpi
- Chinchirusa
- Chunta (Junín-Lima)
- Chunta (Lima)
- Chuqi Chukchu
- Ch'uspi
- Hatun Ukru
- Inka Kancha
- Janq'uni
- Jirish Mach'ay
- Kashpi
- Kiwyu
- Kunkus Yantaq
- Lichiqucha
- Lichiqucha (Chic-Ya.)
- Liyunqucha
- Llawa P'ukru
- Llipina
- Mankan
- Millpu
- Millu
- Mulli
- Nina Ukru
- Ñuñu
- Pachanqutu
- Paka
- Paqcha
- Paraqti
- Parqu
- Parya Chaka
- P'iti
- Pukaqucha
- Putka
- P'iti
- Phiruruyuq
- Qanchis Kancha
- Qaqa Ranra
- Qarwa Ranra
- Qayqu
- Qullqayuq
- Qullqi
- Qunchupata
- Quñuq P'ukru
- Quri
- Quri Kancha
- Quri Wayin
- Quriwasi
- Raqray
- Rukutu
- Saqsa
- Sarayuq
- Shaqsha Punta
- Shira
- Shiraq
- Sillaqaqa
- Suqlla
- Suyruqucha (Junín-Lima)
- Suyruqucha (Huarochirí)
- Suyuq
- Taksaqucha
- Tarapu
- Tata Qayqu
- Tawllin
- Tikti Mach'ay
- Turiyuq
- Ukrupata
- Uqhu
- Uqsha
- Uqsha Wallqa
- Utush Mikhunan
- Uyshu
- Wachwa
- Wallapi
- Wamanripa (Caramp.)
- Wamanripa (S. Damian)
- Wamanripa (S. Mateo)
- Wamanripayuq
- Wamp'ar
- Waqaypaka
- Wararayuq
- Waras Kancha
- Waskhar
- Waswa Punta
- Wayrakancha
- Willka Pampa
- Wiqu
- Yana Qaqa
- Yana Ulla
- Yana Yana
- Yanaqucha
- Yawriq
- Yuraq Anka (Junín-Lima)
- Yuraq Anka (Lima)
- Yuraqqucha

== Political division ==
The province is divided into thirty-two districts.

- Matucana (Matucana) (seat)
- Antioquia (Antioquia)
- Callahuanca (Callahuanca)
- Carampoma (Carampoma)
- Chicla (Chicla)
- Cuenca (San José de los Chorillos)
- Huachupampa (San Lorenzo de Huachupampa)
- Huanza (Huanza)
- Huarochirí (Huarochirí)
- Lahuaytambo (Lahuaytambo)
- Langa (Langa)
- Laraos (Laraos)
- Mariatana (Mariatana)
- Ricardo Palma (Ricardo Palma)
- San Andrés de Tupicocha (San Andrés de Tupicocha)
- San Antonio (Chaclla)
- San Bartolome (San Bartolome)
- San Damian (San Damian)
- San Juan de Iris (San Juan de Iris)
- San Juan de Tantaranche (San Juan de Tantaranche)
- San Lorenzo de Quinti (San Lorenzo de Quinti)
- San Mateo (San Mateo)
- San Mateo de Otao (San Juan de Lanca)
- San Pedro de Casta (San Pedro de Casta)
- San Pedro de Huancayre (San Pedro)
- Sangallaya (Sangallaya)
- Santa Cruz de Cocachacra (Cocachacra)
- Santa Eulalia (Santa Eulalia)
- Santiago de Anchucaya (Santiago de Anchucaya)
- Santiago de Tuna (Santiago de Tuna)
- Santo Domingo de los Olleros (Santo Domingo de los Olleros)
- Surco (Surco)

== See also ==
- Antaqucha
- Pukaqucha
- P'itiqucha (Huanza)
- P'itiqucha (Quinti)
- Qiwllaqucha
- Tiktiqucha
- Wachwaqucha
- Wamp'arqucha
- Huarochirí Manuscript
- Yuraqmayu
