= Uqhu (Lima) =

Mountain in Peru

- Location within Peru

Highest point
- Elevation: 5,262 m (17,264 ft)
- Coordinates: 11°53′45″S 76°14′29″W

Geography
- Location: Peru, Lima Region
- Parent range: Andes, Cordillera Central

Uqhu (Quechua for swamp, Hispanicized spelling Uco) or Ukhu (Quechua for deep) is a 5,262-metre-high (17,264 ft) mountain in the Cordillera Central in the Andes of Peru. It is located in the Lima Region, Huarochirí Province, on the border of the districts of San Damian and San Mateo. Uqhu is situated northwest of the mountain named Suyruqucha. A little lake called Suyruqucha lies at its feet.
