= Huanza District =

Coordinates: 11.6560°S 76.5034°W

Huanza
- District
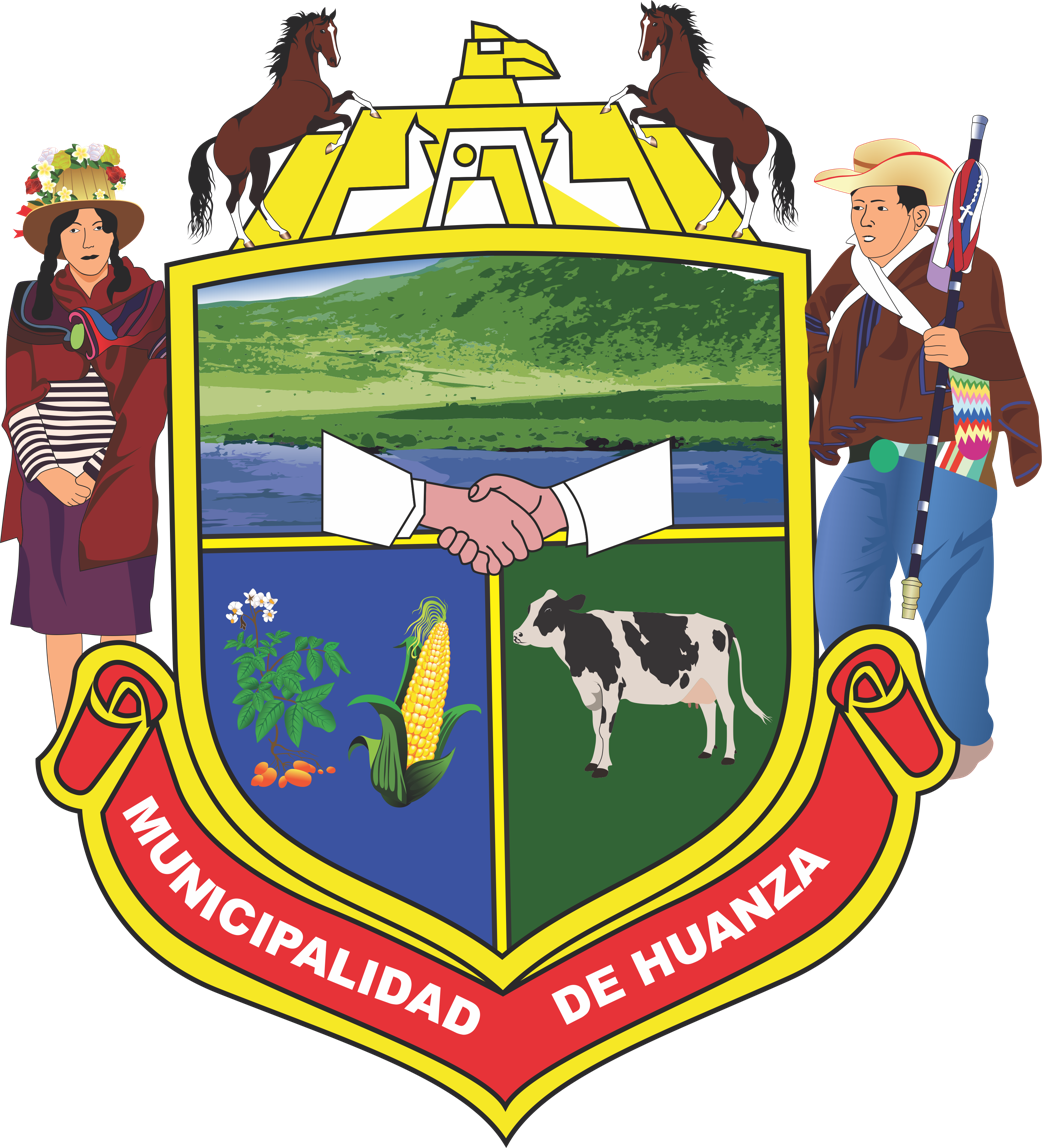
- Coat of arms
- Interactive map of Huanza
- Country: Peru
- Region: Lima
- Province: Huarochirí
- Founded: June 8, 1959
- Capital: Huanza

Government
  - Mayor: Donatila Cecilia Espinoza Rojas (2019-2022)

Area
  - Total: 227.01 km^{2} (87.65 sq mi)
- Elevation: 3,408 m (11,181 ft)

Population (2017)
  - Total: 875
  - Density: 3.85/km^{2} (9.98/sq mi)
- Time zone: UTC-5 (PET)
- UBIGEO: 150708

Huanza District is one of thirty-two districts of the province Huarochirí in Peru.

== Geography ==
The Cordillera de la Corte traverses the district. Some of the highest peaks are Chunta and Kashpi on the northeastern border of the district. Other mountains are listed below:

- Anta Ranra
- Hankapata
- Kiwyu
- Lichiqucha
- Llipi
- Milla
- P'iti
- Qullqi
- Quri Wayin
- Saqsa
- Tunshuqucha
- Uyshu
- Wank'a
- Waskhar

Some of the largest lakes of the district are Pukaqucha, P'itiqucha, Saqsaqucha and Wask'aqucha.
