= Wachwaqucha =

Lake in Peru

- Location within Peru
- Location: Lima Region
- Coordinates: 11°37′33.8″S 76°20′15.5″W
- Basin countries: Peru

Wachwaqucha (Quechua wachwa Andean goose, qucha lake, lagoon, "Andean goose lake", hispanicized spelling Huachuguacocha) is a lake in Peru located in the Lima Region, Huarochiri Province, Carampoma District. It lies northwest of Millpu and Wachwa and southwest of Wamp'arqucha.

== See also ==
- List of lakes in Peru
