= Qullqi (Lima) =

Mountain in Peru

- Location within Peru

Highest point
- Elevation: 5,038 m (16,529 ft)
- Coordinates: 11°34′14″S 76°29′5″W

Geography
- Location: Peru, Lima Region
- Parent range: Andes

Qullqi (Aymara and Quechua for silver, Hispanicized spelling Colqui) is a 5,038-metre-high (16,529 ft) mountain in the Andes of Peru. It is situated in the Lima Region, Huarochirí Province, Huanza District. Qullqi lies east of the Qiwlla River (Quiula) and west of the Qullqi valley (Collque). One of the nearest places is Qullqi (Collque) southeast of the mountain.
