= Wamanripayuq (Lima) =

Mountain in Peru

- Location within Peru

Highest point
- Elevation: 5,000 m (16,000 ft)
- Coordinates: 11°38′01″S 76°22′17″W

Geography
- Location: Peru, Lima Region
- Parent range: Andes

Wamanripayuq (Quechua wamanripa Senecio, -yuq a suffix, "the one with the wamanripa", also spelled Huamanripayoc) is a mountain in the Andes of Peru which reaches an altitude of approximately 5,000 metres (16,404 ft). It is located in the Lima Region, Huarochirí Province, Carampoma District. Wamanripayuq lies east of Awqa Pallqa.
