= P'iti =

Mountain in Peru

- Location within Peru

Highest point
- Elevation: 5,117 m (16,788 ft)
- Coordinates: 11°31′50″S 76°24′51″W

Geography
- Location: Peru, Lima Region
- Parent range: Andes

P'iti (Quechua for dividing by pulling powerfully to the extremes; gap, interruption, also spelled Piti) is a 5,117-metre-high (16,788 ft) mountain in the Andes of Peru. It is situated in the Lima Region, Huarochirí Province, Huanza District. P'iti lies northeast of a lake named P'itiqucha.
