= Suyruqucha (Huarochirí) =

Mountain in Peru

- Location within Peru

Highest point
- Elevation: 5,252 m (17,231 ft)
- Coordinates: 11°54′45″S 76°13′08″W

Geography
- Location: Peru, Lima Region
- Parent range: Andes, Cordillera Central

Suyruqucha (Quechua suyru a very long dress tracked after when worn, qucha lake, Hispanicized spelling Suerococha) is a 5,252-metre-high (17,231 ft) mountain in the Cordillera Central in the Andes of Peru and the name of a little lake near the mountain. The peak of the mountain lies in the Lima Region, Huarochirí Province, on the border of the districts of Huarochirí, San Damian and San Mateo. It is situated southeast of Uqhu.

The mountain is named after a small lake northwest of it and southeast of Uqhu. It lies in the San Mateo District at 11°54′07″S 76°14′16″W.
