= Hash House =

Hash House may refer to:

- hash-house; see Glossary of early twentieth century slang in the United States
- Hash House a go go, a restaurant chain
- Hash House Bikers, an international group of non-competitive bicycling, social clubs
- Hash House Harriers, an international group of non-competitive running, social clubs
- Hash House, Royal Selangor Club, Kuala Lumpur, Malaysia; a club annex
- Hash House, Las Vegas, NV, US; a restaurant, see 2012 season 12 of Chopped
- John T. Hash House, a historic home in Dayton, Oregon, USA
- Hash House Hemp Products, a hemp retailer located in Lake Havasu City, Arizona, USA

== See also ==
- House (disambiguation)
- Hash (disambiguation)
