= Polvos Azules =

Shopping centre in Lima, Peru

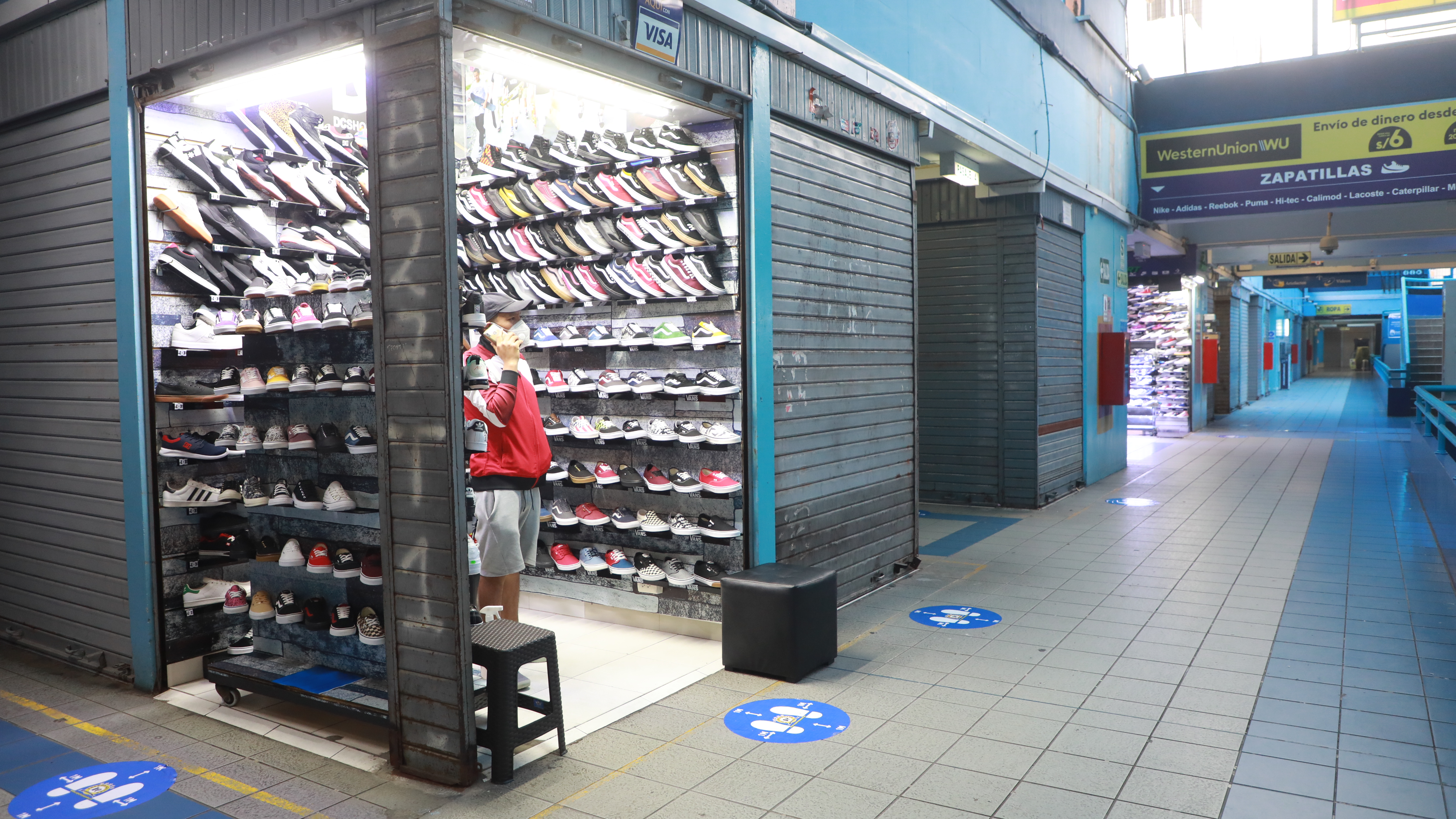
- Location: La Victoria District, Lima
- Address: Paseo de la República
- Opened: June 8, 1981
- Num. of stores: 2,000

Polvos Azules is a shopping centre located in La Victoria District, Lima, Peru. Originally located behind Government Palace, it has since moved to its current location next to the Paseo de la República expressway, keeping the name it inherited from its original location, today the Alameda Chabuca Granda.

== History ==
Prior to its formation, there were places for ambulatory commerce located on the Rímac River. In June 1981, Mayor Eduardo Orrego Villacorta moved the immigrant vendors to what was later known as the Alameda Chabuca Granda, which was named Campo Ferial Polvos Azules. In addition, the Departmental Federation of Street Vendors of Lima (Spanish: Federación Departamental de Vendedores Ambulantes de Lima) was formed for its administration. The place took its name from Polvos Azules Street, so called because on that shore there were some tanneries where indigo dyeing work was carried out on goat skins.

Conditions during their stay were problematic. In January 1993, a fire was reported near the parking lot of the fairgrounds, with million-dollar losses, which motivated workers to move for fear of being evicted due to urban growth. By 1997 they migrated to a stable area, specifically to the Paseo de la República, whose two-story infrastructure was based on an old 16,000 m^{2} textile factory.

The current location has capacity for around 2,000 stores, whose merchants were gradually formalized. Its income in 2011 was S/. 35 million. There are sales of clothing, appliances, toys and crafts. Iconically, it is known for the sale of audiovisual products, mostly pirated, as dozens of stores were established with laboratories for reproducing Peruvian and American films and television series throughout its history. Due to the large volume of counterfeit merchandise, it was the focus of the Office of the United States Trade Representative until 2022.

== See also ==
- Gamarra Moda Plaza
