= Puente Rayitos de Sol =

Bridge in Lima, Peru

Rayitos de Sol Bridge Puente Rayitos de Sol
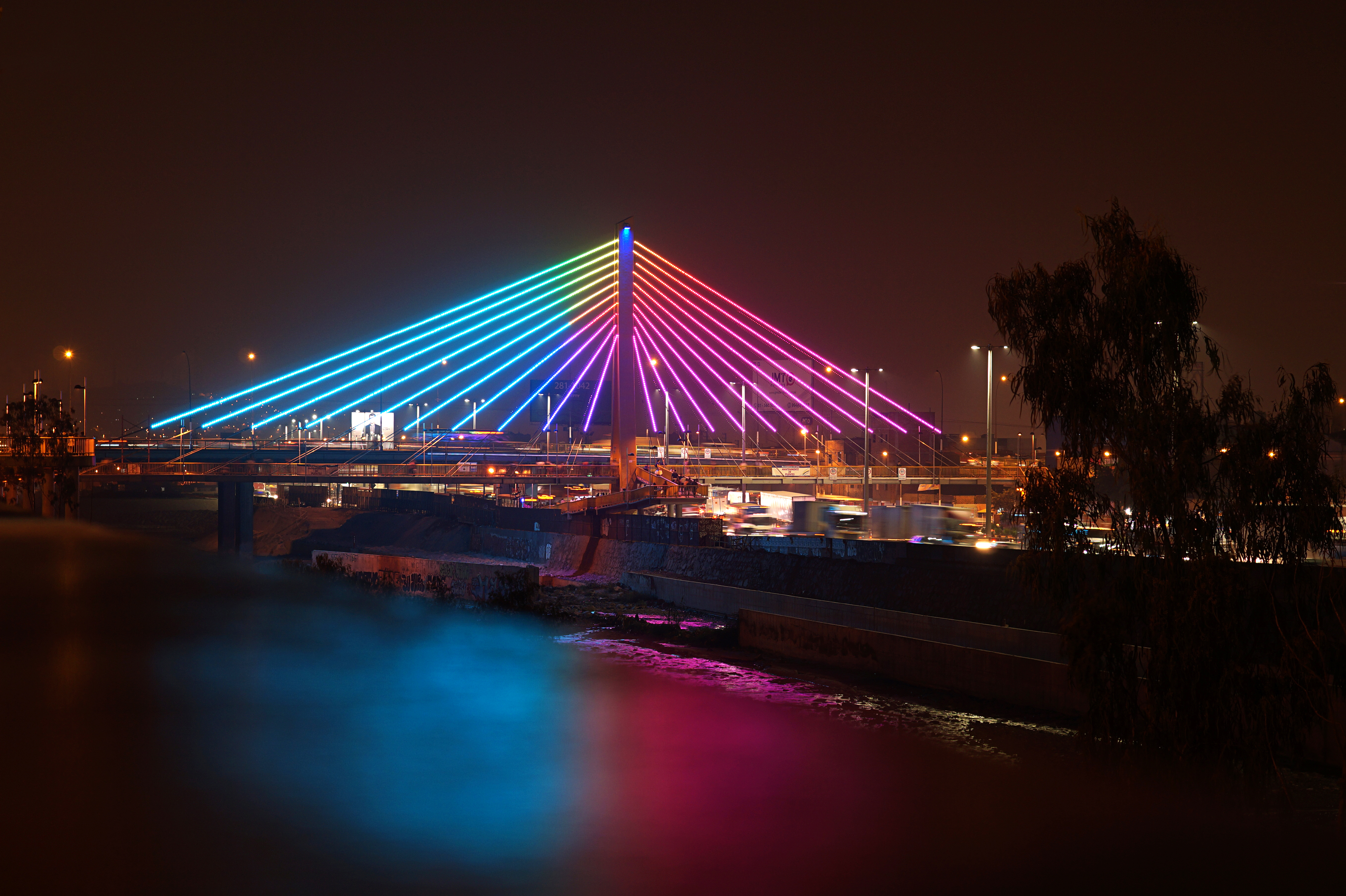
- The bridge in 2016
- Coordinates: 12°02′29″S 77°01′59″W
- Crosses: Rímac river
- Begins: Vía de Evitamiento
- Ends: Al. Chabuca Granda

History
- Construction cost: S/. ≈2,500,000
- Inaugurated: 2006

Rayitos de Sol Bridge (Spanish: Puente Rayitos de Sol) is a pedestrian bridge in the historic centre of Lima, Peru. It crosses the Rímac river, connecting the Vía de Evitamiento with the Alameda Chabuca Granda.

== History ==
The bridge was inaugurated on November 7, 2006, and cost S/. two and a half million (US$ 780,000). Then, a lighting system was installed, consisting of nearly 7,000 LED lights, placed on the 1,500 m of cable-stayed structures that support the bridge, at a cost of S/. 381,000.

In 2011 it was reported that the bridge was oscillating. Flaws in the design were identified and the structure was reinforced. In March 2013 it was temporarily closed, and the same thing happened in April 2017, coinciding in both cases with Holy Week.

== Overview ==
The bridge has an extension of over 216 m and is divided into two sections, one suspension and the other fixed. The hanging part, at one end, is anchored in the fixed section of the pedestrian bridge and attached to the concrete structure by forty steel cables.

== Gallery ==
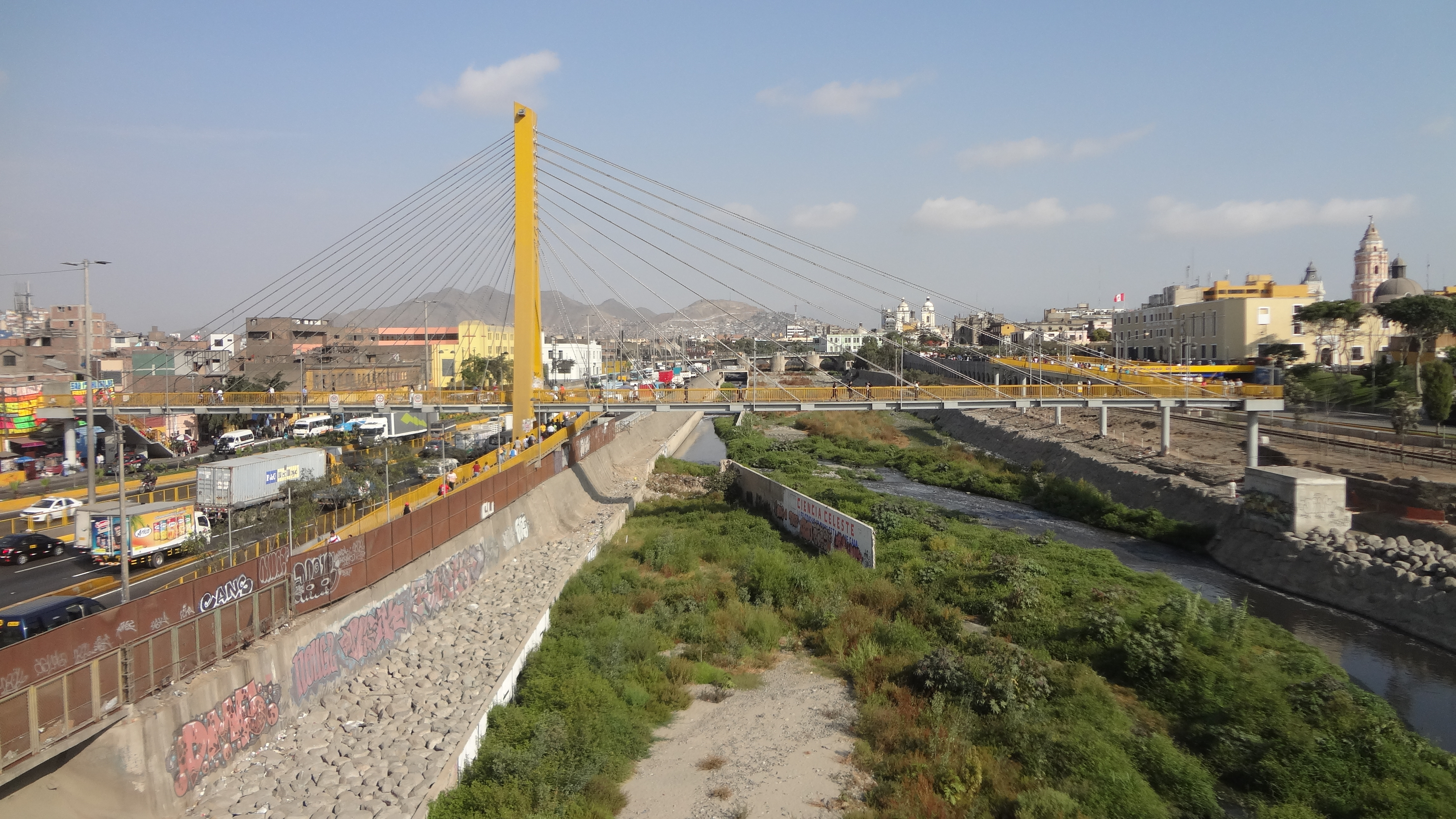
View from neighbouring Tacna bridge

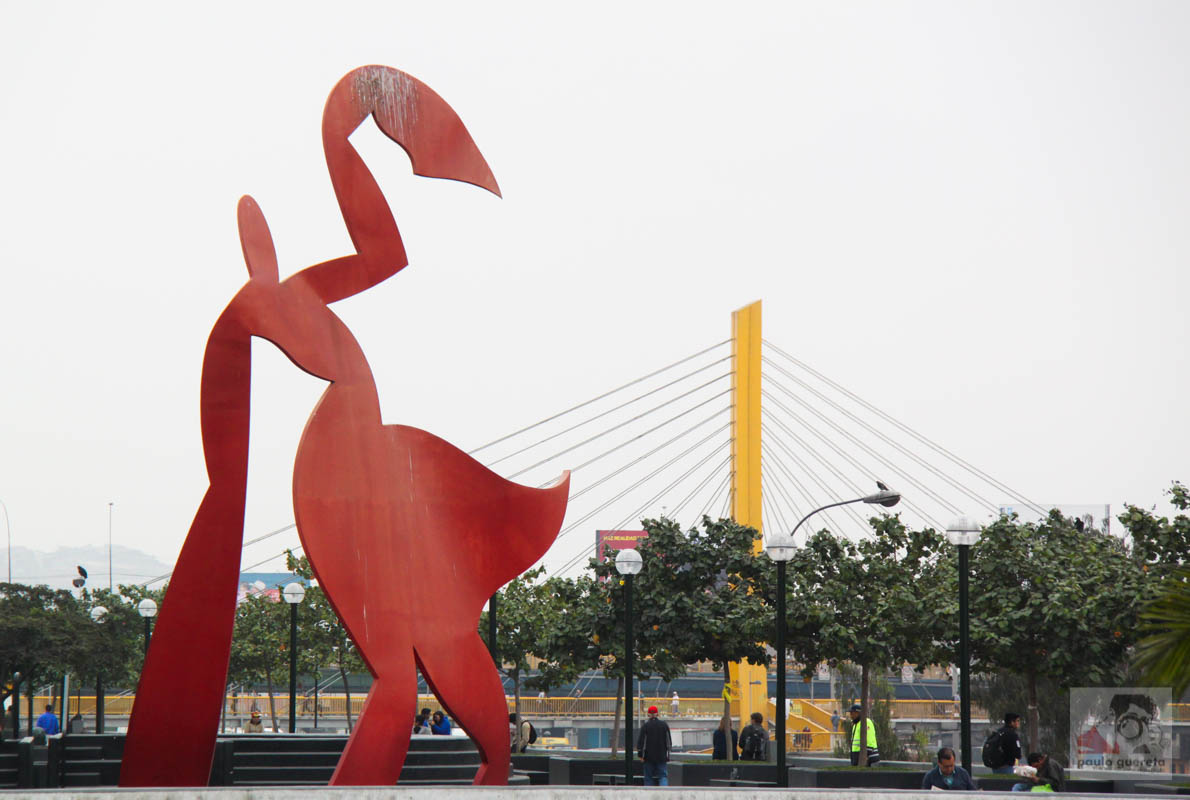
View from the alameda

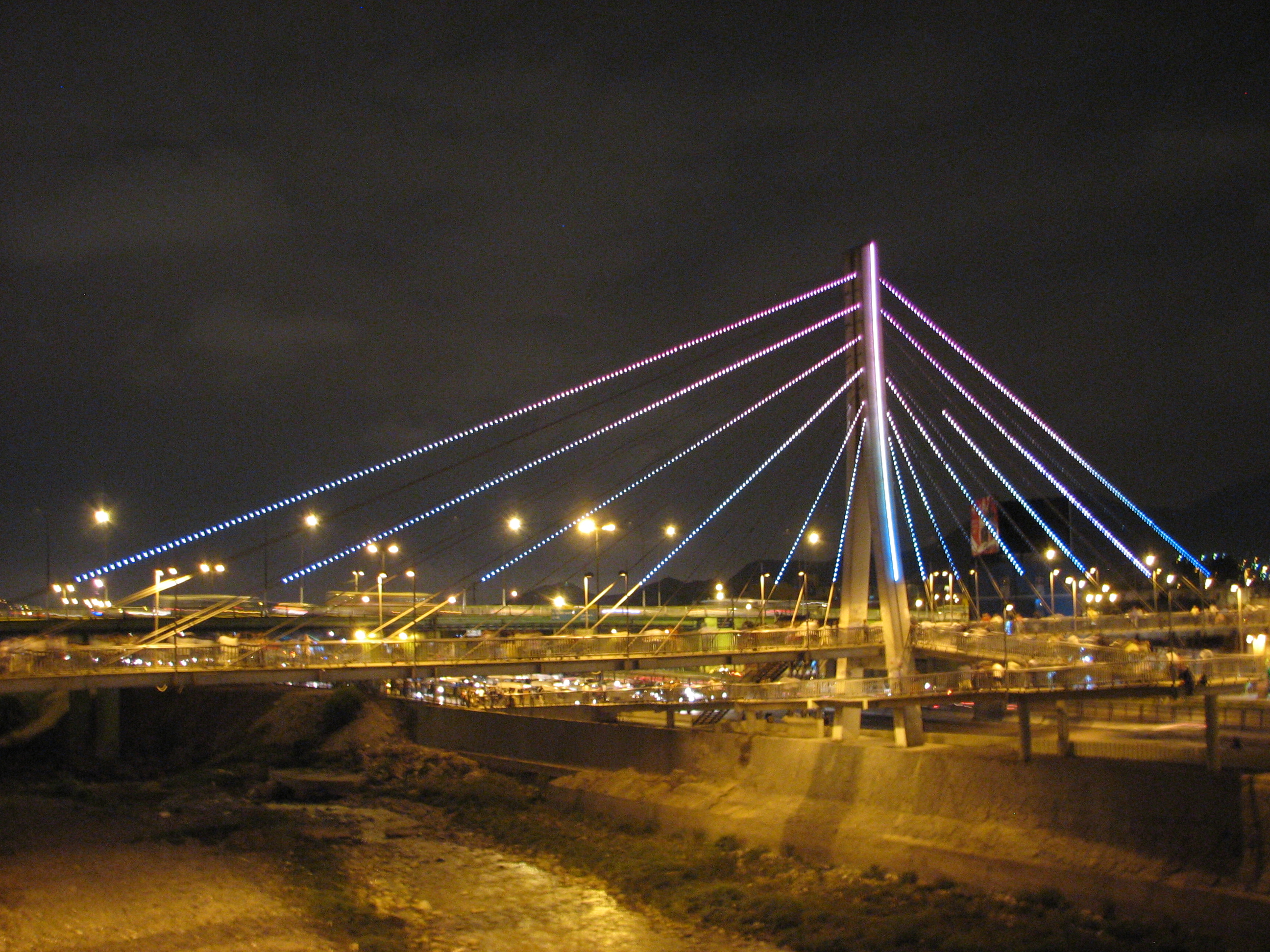
View at night

== See also ==
- Alameda Chabuca Granda
