= Alameda Chabuca Granda =

Promenade in Lima, Peru

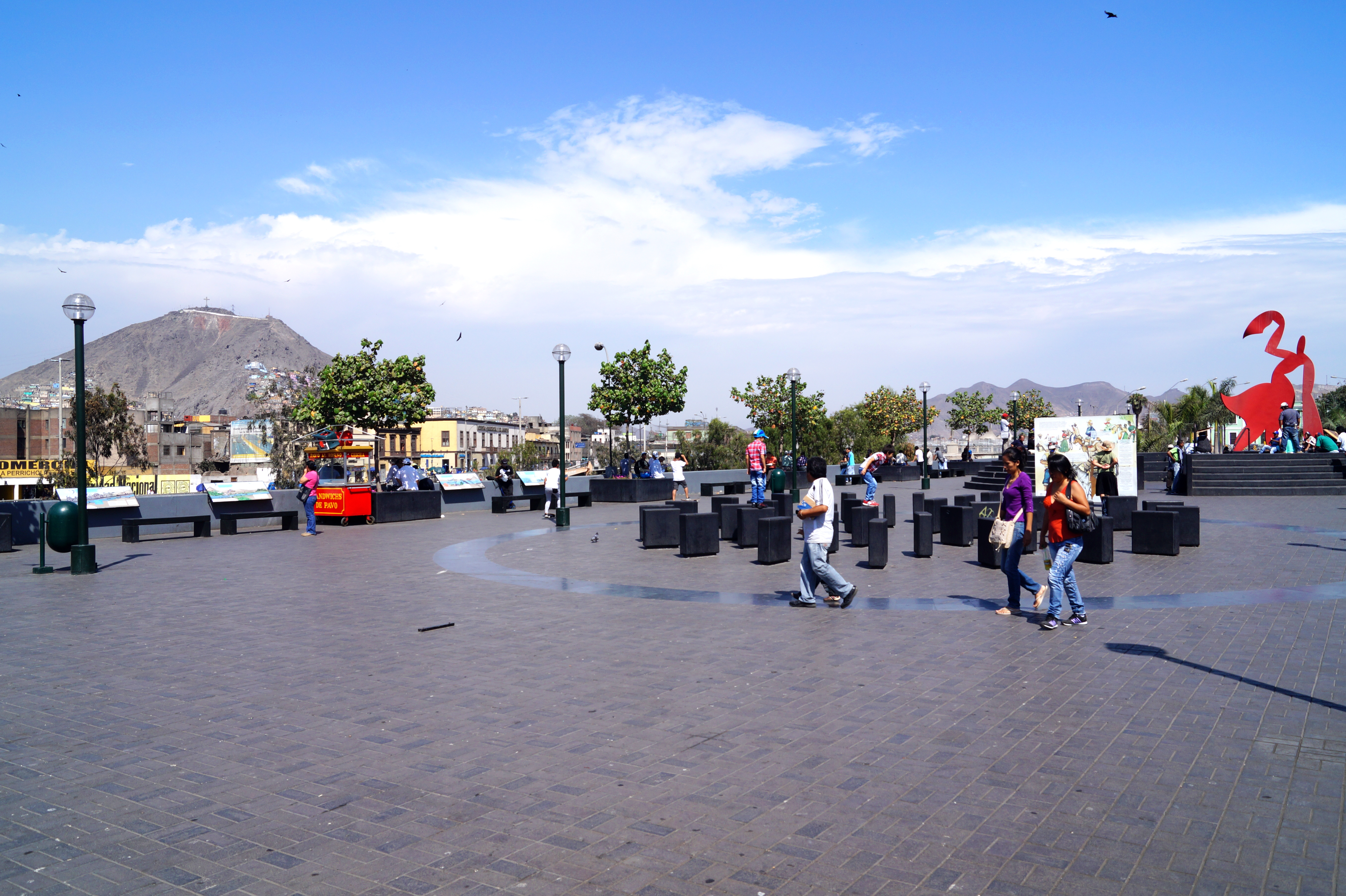
- The alameda in 2015
- Interactive map of Alameda Chabuca Granda
- Part of: Damero de Pizarro
- Namesake: Chabuca Granda
- From: Jirón Santa
- Major junctions: Jirón Camaná, Jirón Rinconada de Santo Domingo
- To: Tacna Avenue (extension road)

Chabuca Granda Promenade (Spanish: Alameda Chabuca Granda) is a pedestrian promenade in the historic centre of Lima, Peru. It is located adjacent to the banks of the Rímac River, and partially incorporates Santa Street (Spanish: Jirón Santa), a single-block street located to the west of Government Palace, between Union and Camaná streets.

It is a mandatory venue for the Art Biennials ("La Gran Semana de Lima") and gastronomy festivals that take place annually in the city. It usually offers modules with typical food and desserts.

== History ==
The promenade is built in the site of the former Polvos Azules marketplace, itself occupying the former site of the Venetian Palace. The name of the market was taken from the name of the street, which was the only block of Santa street, itself named after Santa province.

The new promenade was named in honour of Chabuca Granda, a renowned Peruvian singer-songwriter who created and performed a large number of Creole waltzes and Afro-Peruvian rhythms.

The promenade's three amphitheatres were demolished on June 11, 2026.

=== La marinera ===
The avenue is crowned by a large steel sculpture without chrome and painted in red titled "La marinera", the work of artist Rhony Alhalel, which pays tribute to the marinera, the national dance of Peru.

== See also ==
- Puente Rayitos de Sol, which joins the alameda and the other side of the Rímac river
- Palacio Veneciano
- Chabuca Granda
