= Hashtag (disambiguation) =

Hashtags are metadata indicator marks.

Hashtag may also refer to:

- Number sign or hashtag, the typographical symbol
- HashTag (group), Korean girl group
- Hashtag (EP), 2024 debut EP by Candy Shop
- "Hashtag", by NCT JNJM from Both Sides, 2026
- Hashtag United F.C., or simply "Hashtag", a soccer team from Essex, England, UK
- Hashtags (dancers), a Filipino male dance group
- Hashtag the Panda, a fictional character

== See also ==
- Hash (disambiguation)
- Tag (disambiguation)
