= Palacio Veneciano =

Former building in Lima, Peru

Venetian Palace
- Palacio Veneciano
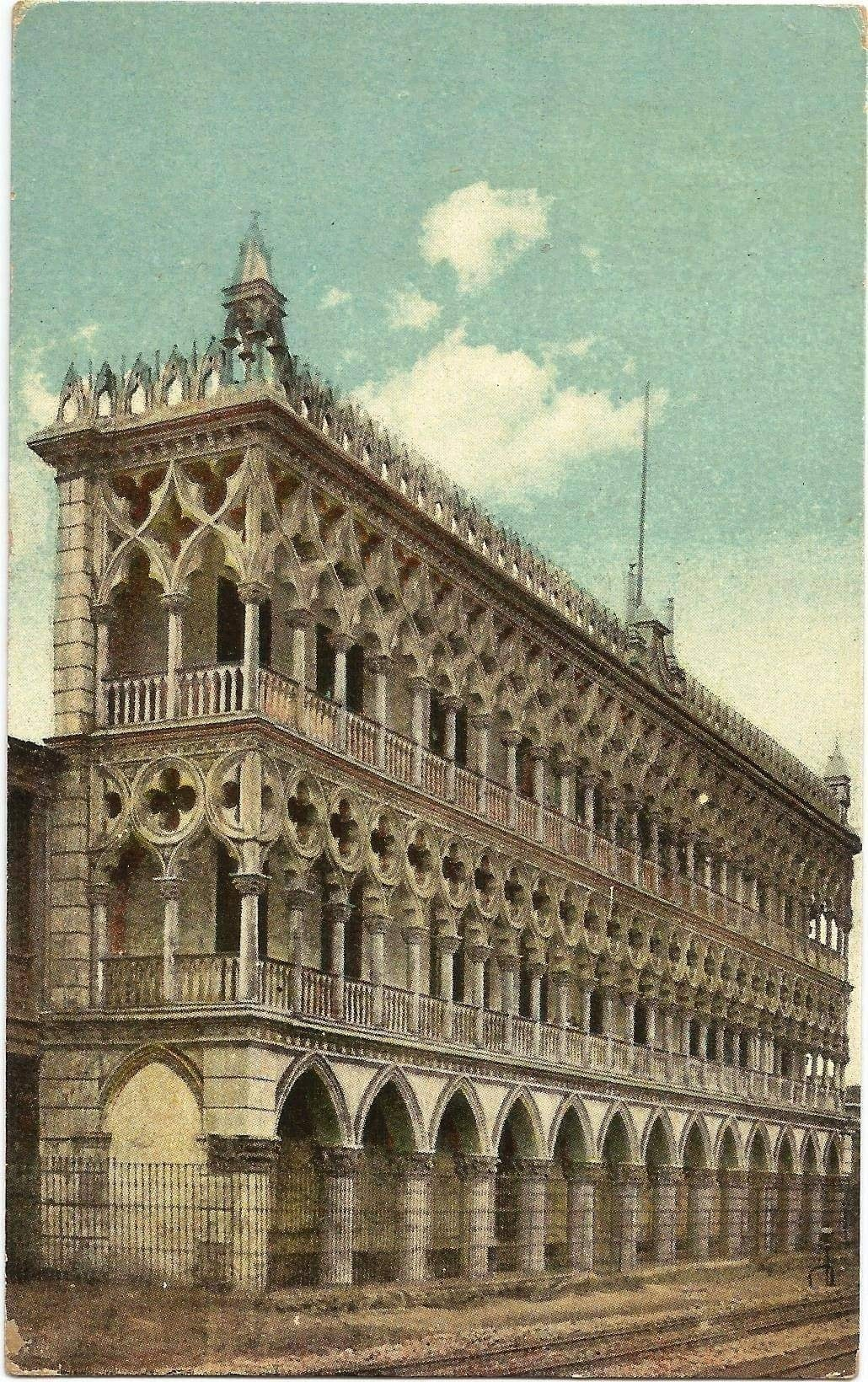
- Interactive map of the Venetian Palace area

General information
- Architectural style: Neoclassical, Venetian-inspired
- Location: Historic Centre of Lima

The Venetian Palace (Spanish: Palacio Veneciano), also known as the Casa Concha or Casa Concha Astete, was a palace in the historic centre of Lima District. The building, inspired by the Doge's Palace of Venice and located in the vicinity of the Puente de Piedra and the Government Palace, was ultimately demolished by the military government of Manuel A. Odría.

== History ==
The Neoclassical palace was built during the 19th century in what was then Polvos Azules street (Spanish: Calle de los Polvos Azules), the property of the Vega del Ren noble family. The owner of the property also owned more land across the Rímac river.

The building's Venetian-inspired posterior façade, which faced the river, was part of the Port of Lima, a project that intended to channelise the river in a similar fashion to the Italian city's waterways. The project was ultimately abandoned.

An underground tunnel that was part of the property passed under the river, ending in a house among the street, where a large amount of gold coins were found by its owner, a man with the last name of Barbieri, who hid his treasure by claiming to have found success in the oil industry. Mr. Barbieri later bought and restored a property owned by the Villar de la Fuente countship located in Piedra St. which later served as the headquarters of the Board of Lima (Spanish: Patronato de Lima).

News of the treasure reached the military government of the time, who unsuccessfully intimidated the owner of both properties into demolishing the property. As a result, he was jailed under conspiracy charges it was expropriated and what was left of the treasure looted. The building's demolition was realised under the pretext that the area would serve as a promenade next to the river. However, such plans did not take place, and the area served first as a parking lot and later as a street market.

The area in which the building was once located is now the Alameda Chabuca Granda.

== See also ==
- Casa Marsano
