= La Atarjea Water Treatment Plant =

Water treatment plant in Lima, Peru

Coordinates: 12.0387°S 76.9762°W

La Atarjea
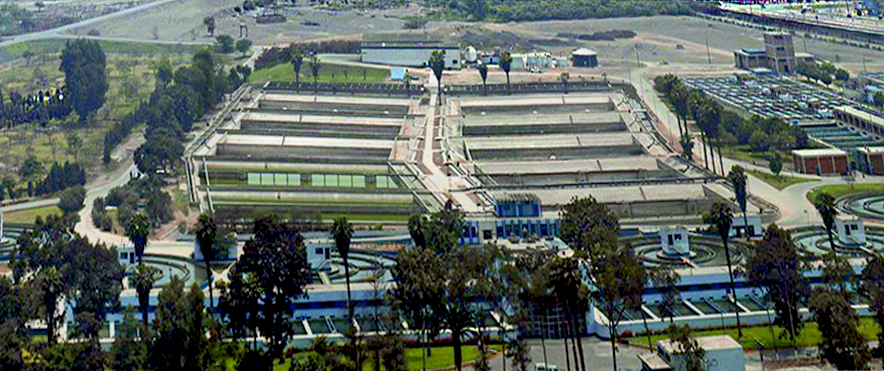
- Interactive map of La Atarjea
- Location: El Agustino
- Estimated output: 16–18 m^{3}/s
- Operation date: July 28, 1956

La Atarjea is a water treatment plant located in El Agustino, a district of Lima, Peru. Originally a spring, it serves the headquarters of SEDAPAL, the city's water treatment company that also services Callao.

== History ==
La Atarjea was originally a spring located in the eastern outskirts of the city of Lima, behind Presbítero Maestro Cemetery. People from Lima drank their water straight from the Rímac River until 1552, when local authorities began looking for alternate sources. An aqueduct was built in 1563 to supply the fountain at the Plaza Mayor and the city's convents.

On December 24, 1953, a freight train of the Ferrocarril Central Andino headed for Lima derailed next to the area, killing seven people.

In 1955, the government of Manuel A. Odría signed a contract with Degrémont in order to construct a proper treatment plant in an 11-month period with a capacity of 5 m^{3}/s, the largest of its time. In the following decade, its capacity was increased to 7.5 m^{3}/s.

== See also ==
- SEDAPAL
