= SEDAPAL =

Government organisation in Peru

Lima Drinking Water and Sewer Service
- Servicio de Agua Potable y Alcantarillado de Lima
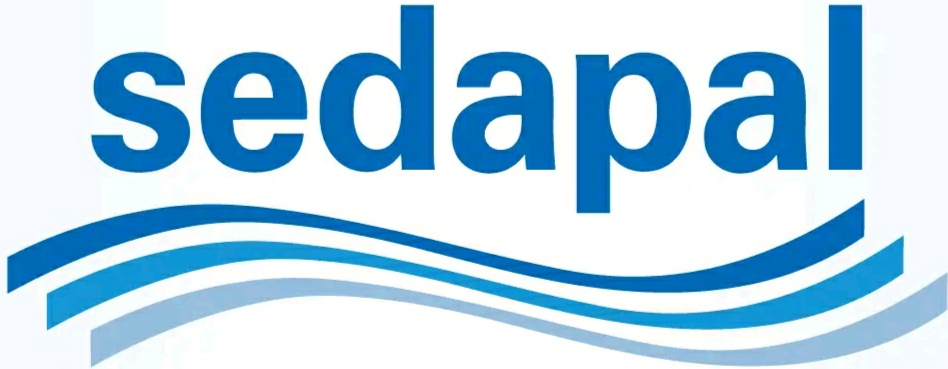

Agency overview
- Formed: June 8, 1962
- Preceding agency: ESAL
- Type: State-owned enterprise
- Jurisdiction: Lima & Callao
- Headquarters: La Atarjea
- Employees: 9,765 (2018)
- Annual budget: S/. 9,726,661,080
- Agency executive: Polo Agüero Sánchez, General manager
- Parent department: Ministry of Housing, Construction and Sanitation
- Website: www.gob.pe/sedapal

The Lima Drinking Water and Sewer Service (Spanish: Servicio de Agua Potable y Alcantarillado de Lima), also known by its acronym SEDAPAL, is a Peruvian state-owned enterprise created in 1962. It manages the drinking water supply of the metropolitan area of Lima and Callao. The water it supplies is treated in La Atarjea in El Agustino, and supplies more than nine million inhabitants of Lima.

== History ==
=== Early years ===
On December 21, 1578, water reached the fountain in the Plaza Mayor for the first time. From then on, the waters of the La Atarjea springs were used. The population of Lima was supplied with pylons.

In 1855, a group of Peruvian businessmen, with the support of President Ramón Castilla, organized a commercial entity that changed clay pipes for cast iron pipes in Lima. Later, this entity was transformed into the Drinking Water Company (Spanish: Empresa de Agua Potable), which administered the service until 1913. That year, the Superior Council of Drinking Water of Lima (Spanish: Consejo Superior de Agua Potable de Lima) was formed, later called the Municipal Board of Drinking Water of Lima (Spanish: Junta Municipal de Agua Potable de Lima).

In 1918, this institution undertook the construction of the La Menacho (El Agustino) reservoir with the application of alumina to the water and the expansion of the distribution network.

In 1920, the Lima Drinking Water Board (Spanish: Junta de Agua Potable de Lima) was established and in that same year, the Municipality of Lima handed over the administration of the water service to The Foundation Company, later passing it to the Public Works Directorate of the Ministry of Public Works.

In 1930, the Superintendency of Drinking Water of Lima (Spanish: Superintendencia de Agua Potable de Lima) was formed, as a dependency of the Ministry of Public Works and Development. The first Water Treatment Plant was also built, which came into operation on July 28, 1956.

=== Later years ===
On June 8, 1962, the Lima Sanitation Corporation (Spanish: Corporación de Saneamiento de Lima, Cosal) was formed. This is the date on which the company celebrates its anniversary, when the first public sanitation company with administrative and financial autonomy was formed.

Seven years later, on March 21, 1969, Cosal was restructured and the Lima Sanitation Company (Spanish: Empresa de Saneamiento de Lima, ESAL) was formed as a decentralized public body of the Ministry of Housing.

On June 12, 1981, the National Service for Drinking Water Supply and Sewerage (Spanish: Servicio Nacional de Abastecimiento de Agua Potable y Alcantarillado, SENAPA) was created, modifying the structure and function of ESAL, establishing the Service for Drinking Water and Sewerage of Lima (Sedapal) as a subsidiary company of Senapa. During those years it absorbed the municipal water companies of Callao and Ventanilla.

In 1992, Sedapal became dependent on the Ministry of the Presidency as a state-owned company, under private law with technical, administrative, economic and financial autonomy. In 2002, after the ministry was deactivated, Sedapal became dependent on the reactivated Ministry of Housing, Construction and Sanitation.

=== Recent history ===
In recent years, Sedapal carried out important works that improved the water supply for all the residents of Lima and Callao: Inlet No. 2 was built, the second stage of the Drinking Water Treatment Plant No. 2, the regulating pond No. 2, 12 sand traps, the Induced Recharge of the Rímac Aquifer and the new treated water reservoir with a capacity of 52,000 cubic meters.

In addition, other works were carried out to improve the water service in Lima: Mark III, Use of the Surface and Underground Waters of the Chillón River, the installation of ten large matrix networks to improve the water supply.

== See also ==
- Rímac River
