= Chaclacayo Group =

The Chaclacayo Group was an arts collective of queer artists founded in Chaclacayo, Peru in 1982 by Sergio Zevallos, Raúl Avellaneda and Helmut Psotta. The collective sought to challenge gender binarism amongst other things.

== History ==
The origin of the Chaclacayo Group can be traced back to the Art School of the Catholic University of Peru in 1982. In March 1982, Helmut Psotta from Germany was appointed as a guest teacher to teach composition and design classes. As a part of the course work, Psotta required his students to gather newspaper cuts related to torture, which triggered hostile reactions from some of the students and the college authorities. As his teaching practices were met with opposition, Psotta and two of his like minded students, Sergio Zevallos and Raúl Avellaneda, moved to a house located in the Chaclacayo country district of Lima.

The move to Chaclacayo was an effort to isolate themselves from the homophobia and social conservatism in the official art scene. Between 1982 and 1989, this house-workshop would become their space for artistic creation. The members of the Chaclacayo Group took photographs, and made drawings, sculptures, collages and performances on various religious iconography, oppression of dissident sexuality and war related violence. The group also occasionally collaborated with other artists.

The emergence of the Chaclacayo Group is closely linked to the emergence of the Peruvian "Subway Movement" (Movida Subte) of the 1980s. The movement consisted of counter cultural responses to the traditional structures of the time, expressed through music, the visual arts, performing arts and poetry. Creations associated with it portrayed various themes social crisis, urban chaos and disappointment of the political class. The Chaclacayo Group shared the themes of the movement especially the need to address the exacerbated violence spread by the press about the Peruvian internal armed conflict.

== Exhibitions ==
In November 1984, the group held the exhibition "Perú, un sueño..." ("Peru, a dream...") at the Lima Art Museum with the help of the German art critic Wieland Schmied.

Shortly before the Fall of the Berlin Wall in 1989, the group moved to Germany explore possibilities there amid the financial difficulties in Peru. Their work was presented under the title of Todesbilder. Peru oder das Ende des europäischen Traums ("Images of death. Peru or the end of the European dream") in various German cities and covered a wide range of topics ranging from colonialism in Latin America to the fall of communism in Europe. It included performances, images, texts and music. The works were later given to the Institute for Foreign Cultural Relations in Stuttgart, the Museum of Bochum, the Badischer Kunstverein in Karlsruhe and the festival Fest III in Dresden shortly before the Chaclacayo Group was dissolved in 1995.

In November 2013, the Lima Art Museum inaugurated the exhibition Un cuerpo ambulante. Sergio Zevallos en el grupo Chaclacayo ("A traveling body. Sergio Zevallos in the Chaclacayo Group") in association with the Centro Cultural España (Spanish Cultural Centre).
