= Hash House Harriers =

International group of non-competitive running social clubs

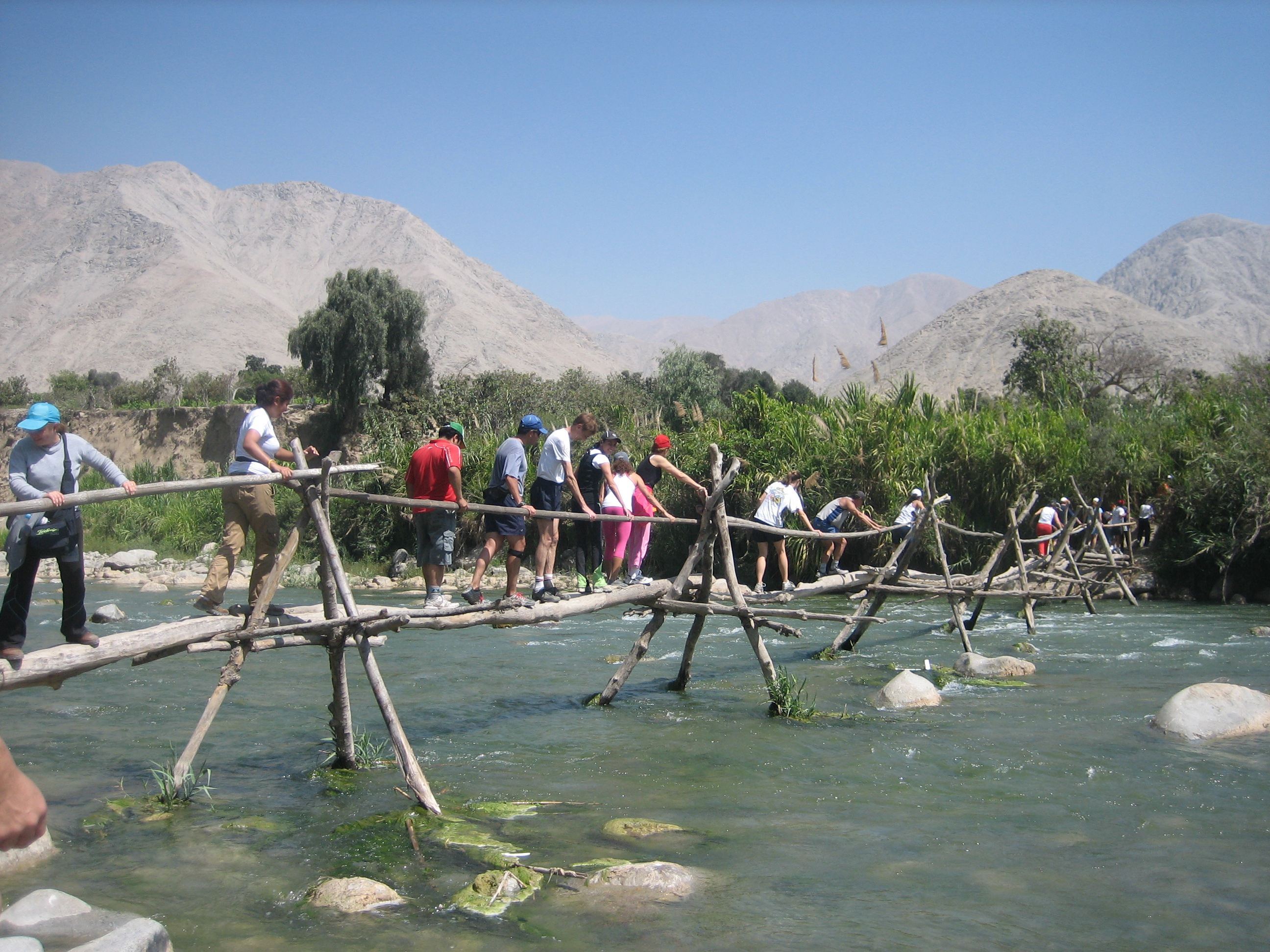
A run of the Lima Hash House Harriers in Lunahuana, Peru.

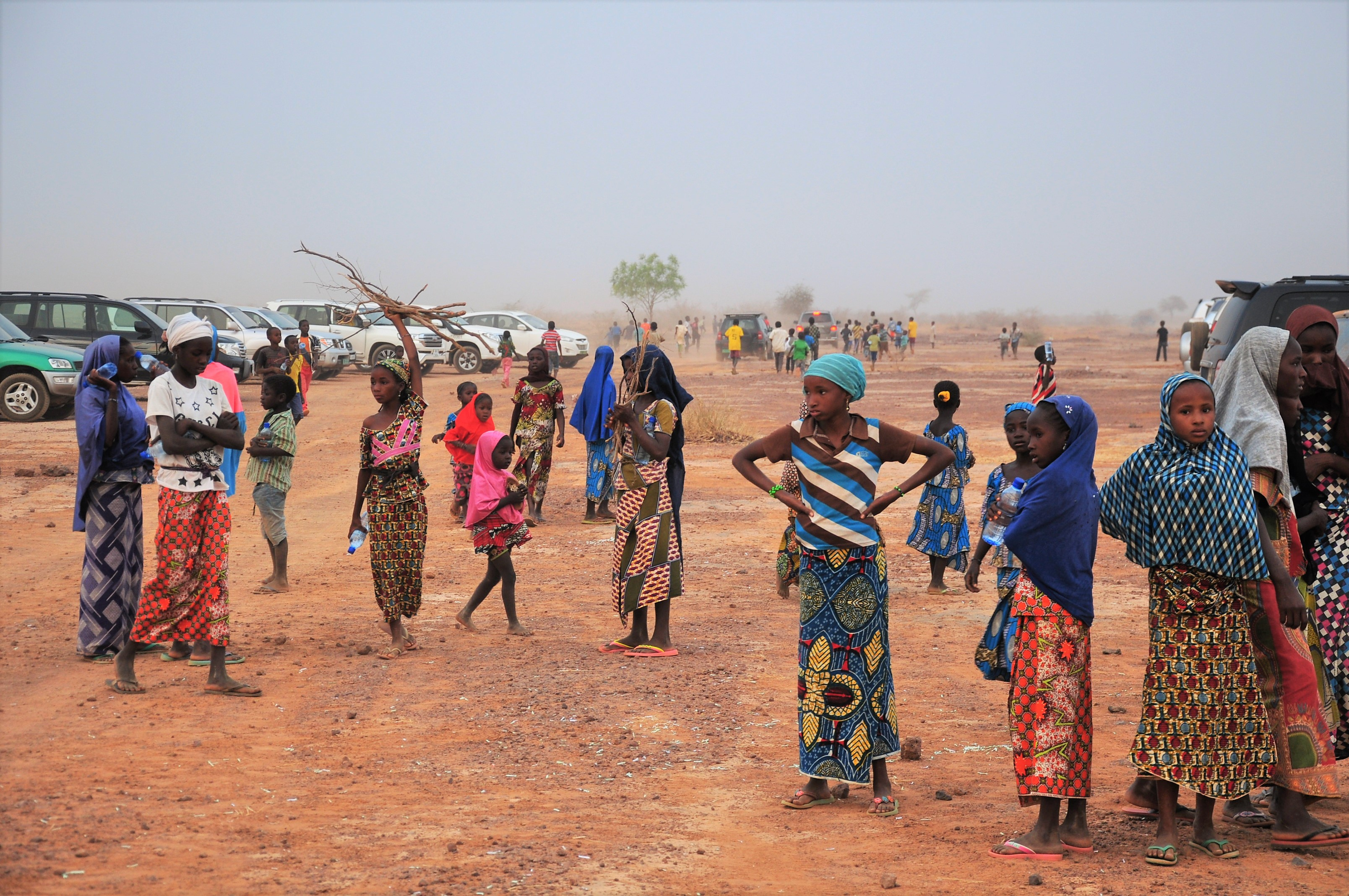
Scene at the end of a run by the Hash House Harriers in the arid landscape around Niamey, Niger. During the run, people from surrounding villages have come to see the sudden influx of cars and strangers. Some girls have obtained a water bottle from the participants, while in the distance boys are running after the departing vehicles as a "goodbye" gesture.

The Hash House Harriers (HHH or H3 or H4) is an international group of non-competitive running social clubs. An event organized by a club is known as a Hash or Run, or a Hash Run. A common denominal verb for this activity is Hashing, with participants calling themselves Hashers. Members are referred to as Harriers or Harriettes based on gender or preference.

The Hash is humorously known as A Drinking Club With A Running Problem, with the preferred beverage of consumption being beer.

== History ==
Hashing originated in December 1938 in Kuala Lumpur, Selangor, then in the Federated Malay States (now Malaysia). A group of British expats began meeting on Friday evenings, to run in a fashion patterned after the traditional British game of hare and hounds, in which one or two "hare" runners scatter a trail of cut paper for the "hounds" to track. Apart from the excitement of chasing the hare and finding the trail, Harriers reaching the end of the trail would partake of beer, ginger beer, and cigarettes. With hash names in parentheses, the original members included Albert Stephen Ignatius Gispert ("G"), Cecil Lee, Frederick Thomson ("Horse"), Ronald Bennett ("Torch"), Eric Galvin, H.M. Doig, and John Woodrow.

A. S. Gispert suggested the name "Hash House Harriers" after the Selangor Club Annex, known as the "Hash House", where several of the original hashers lived and dined. The "Hash House" got its name for "its hodgepodge of edible servings being passed off for food". The term hash was used as an old British slang for "bad food".

Hashing ceased after the Invasion of Malaya during World War II, but several of the original group restarted it in 1946, after the war, and switched to meeting on Monday evenings. A.S.I. Gispert had been killed on 11 February 1942, in the Japanese invasion of Singapore, an event commemorated by many chapters with an annual Gispert Memorial Run.

While attempting to reorganize in the city of Kuala Lumpur after World War II, hashers were informed by the Registrar of Societies that, since they were a "group", they would require a constitution. The objectives of the Hash House Harriers as recorded on the club registration card dated 1950 are:

- To promote physical fitness among our members
- To get rid of weekend hangovers
- To acquire a good thirst and to satisfy it in beer
- To persuade the older members that they are not as old as they feel

In 1962, Ian Cumming founded the second chapter in Singapore. Chapters are commonly called Kennels, following in tradition to similar Hound & Hare clubs. The idea spread through the Far East and the South Pacific, Europe, and North America, expanding rapidly during the mid-1970s.

There are about 1,500 chapters worldwide, with members distributing newsletters, directories, and magazines, and organizing regional and world hashing events. As of 2003, there were even two organized chapters operating in Antarctica.

== Events ==
=== Regular meetings ===
Most hashing clubs gather on a weekly or monthly basis. However, some events occur sporadically, e.g., February 29th, Friday the 13th, Typhoon 'T8' or a full moon.

At a hash, one or more members ("hares") lay a trail, which is then followed by the remainder of the group (the "pack" or "hounds"). Paper, flour, or chalk are usually used to mark the trail. The trail periodically ends at a "check". The pack must find where it begins again; often, the trail includes false trails, short cuts, dead ends, "check backs," and splits. These features are designed to keep the pack together despite differences in fitness level or running or walking speed, as front-runners are forced to slow down to find the "true" trail, allowing stragglers to catch up.

Members sometimes describe their group as "a drinking club with a running problem", indicating that the social element of an event is as important, if not more so, than any athleticism involved. Beer remains an integral part of a hash. However, the balance between running and drinking differs between chapters, with some groups placing more focus on socializing and others on running.

Generally, hash events are open to the public and require no reservation or membership, but most require a small fee, referred to as "hash cash", to cover the costs incurred, such as food or drink, and the club treasurer may also be nicknamed "Hash Cash".

Some hash clubs have a hash home, which could be a bar, restaurant, resort, or a sports club. In that case, the hash always or almost always starts at the hash home. The club may then transport the hashers to some other location to start the run. Other clubs simply advertise the start to membership, usually by posting on a website. The run may finish where it starts, or it may be "A to B," meaning it finishes elsewhere.

It is common to have some combination of runners and walkers within a kennel. At some kennels it is more common that most participants will run and at others, everyone walks. Some kennels meet after dark and use flashlights or headlamps to find the marks, and some meet only during daylight. Some kennels are men only, some women only, but most are mixed. Many are very adult-oriented, which means bawdy drinking songs, etc, and others are family-oriented.

=== Socializing ===
The end of a trail is an opportunity to socialize, have a drink, and observe the traditions of the individual kennel (see Traditions). When the hash officially ends, members may continue socializing at an "on-after", "on-down", "on-on-on", "apres", or "hash bash", an event held at a nearby pub, or restaurant, or private home.

=== Special events ===
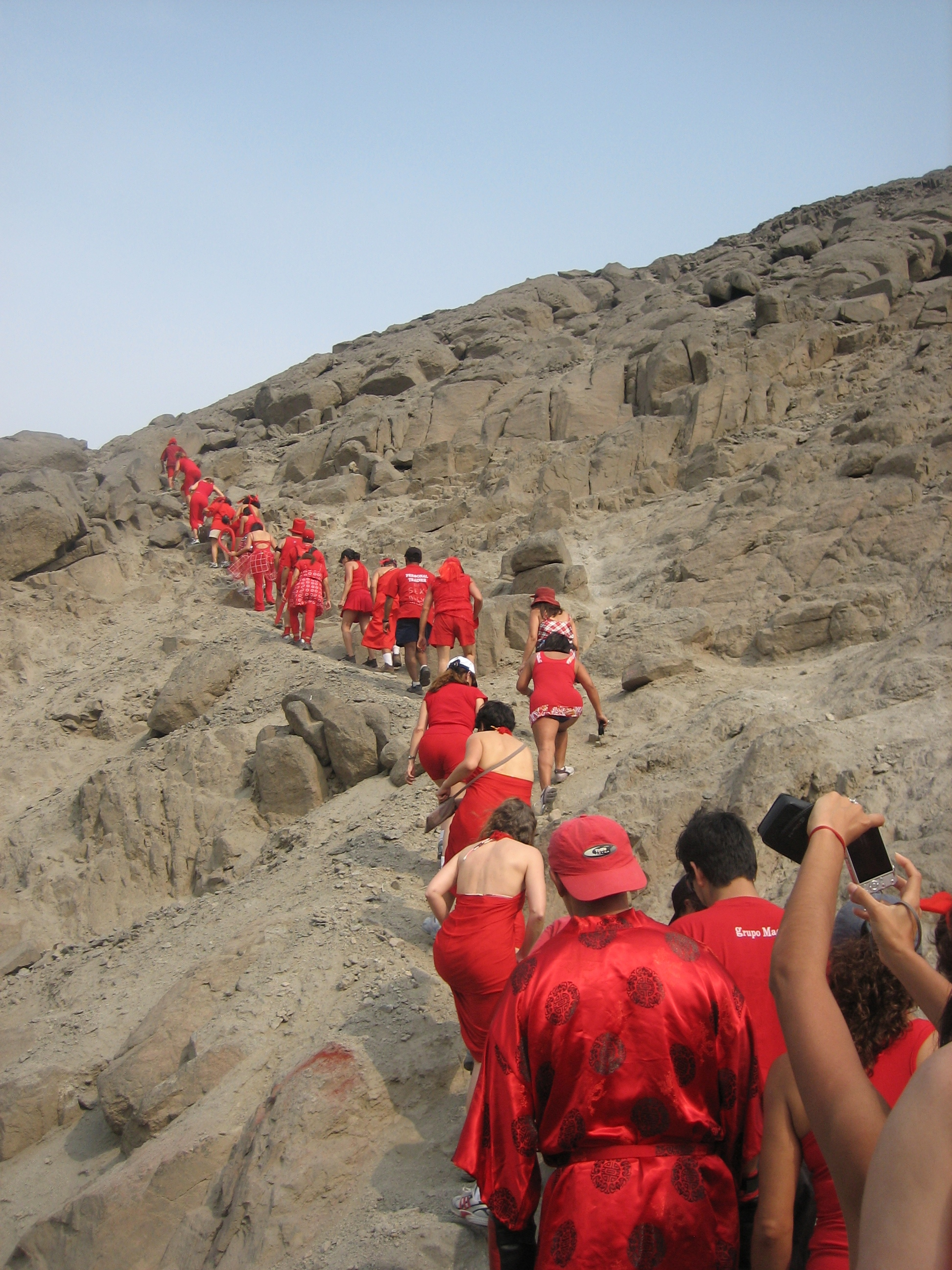
The first Red Dress Run in South America, held in Chaclacayo, Peru,.

In addition to regularly scheduled hashes, a club or chapter may also organize other events or themed runs. Many also hold special events on their anniversaries or when they reach a milestone in the number of runs, e.g. for run number 100, 200, 777, 1,000, etc. This may include multi-day events with several runs and evening celebrations.

=== Red dress runs ===
An event held annually by many chapters is the "Red Dress Run". In 1987, Donna Rhinehart was taken to a hash in Long Beach, California, where she was invited to "wait in the truck" until her host returned. Instead Rhinehart joined the hash in her red dress. The following year, the San Diego Hash House Harriers sent Rhinehart an airline ticket to attend the inaugural "Red Dress Run". Hundreds of hashers wore red dresses for the event which was widely covered by local media. In addressing the crowd, Rhinehart, or "The Lady in Red" as she became known, suggested that such hashes might be held to raise funds for local charities. The event quickly spread around the globe to places such as Beijing, Montreal, Helsinki, Osan/Yangsan Hashers, Moscow, Tokyo, New Orleans, Washington DC, and Hobart, Tasmania. Over the years, it has raised millions of dollars for charity. The New Orleans Hash House Harriers attracted 7,000 participants to their Red Dress Run in 2010, raising more than $200,000 for 50 local charities.

Today the Red Dress Run is a Hash House Harriers' tradition. Rhinehart died in 2013 as the Hash House Harriers were celebrating the 25th anniversary of their Red Dress Run.

=== Variations ===
- Hash House Bikers (Bike hashes or bashes) follow normal hashing traditions with the hare and pack riding bicycles. The two oldest bike hash chapters or kennels are Singapore Bike Hash (July 1989) and Bike-O-Psycho in Orlando, Florida (July 1991).
- River hashes or snorkel hashes (rashes, splashes, or snatches) follow normal hashing traditions, but take place in an aquatic environment with participants using snorkels, fins, kayaks, floats, and other rafts. First documented underwater/scuba Hash trail was in Sharm El Sheikh, Egypt by Cairo H3 in 1990.
- Snowshoe hashes are much like normal trails, but the hare and hounds are in the snow, on snowshoes. Marking trails with white flour or with colored chalk is impractical on snow, so flour can be colored using carpenter's chalk (most common practice) or jello mix (which will be more vibrant when it gets wet from the snow). This practice is commonly used on all winter hash trails in snowy regions, not just snowshoe hashing. Squirts of colored water may be attempted but it has a tendency to be further diluted by the snow and also melts the snow and thus sinks below the surface, becoming less visible than colored flour.
- SKASH is a Ski Hash, accomplished on skis.
- Hash-a-thon, tour-duh-hash, Hash challenge and tri-hash-thon are special "competitive" events. Hash-a-thons involve multiple trails (normally 4) in 24-hour period totaling up to 26.2 miles (a marathon). Tour-duh-Hash is 7 days of hashing. Hash Challenge is a team event (3-4 hashers) who complete a 42 km hash through the Malaysian jungle. Tri-hash-thon is an event consisting of 3 trails: 1 running, 1 swimming/snorkeling/river float, and 1 biking (bash).
- Family hashes welcome children (sometimes called hash house horrors or ankle biters) with soft drinks replacing alcoholic beverages and drinking songs toned down appropriately.
- Pick up hashes – Hashes that follow traditional hashing guidelines minus the pre-selection of a hare. At a pick up hash, the hare is decided randomly at the beginning of the event.
- Disaster Hash – A disaster hash is basically an impromptu hash that can be called by any hash member whenever a disaster occurs. The disaster can be anywhere in the world and can range from an earthquake to a flat tire. The disaster hash differs by two major hash components: the hares, and hash names. The hare is chosen on the spot, given flour, a destination, and a one-minute head start. Whoever catches the hare, becomes the hare, takes the flour, and continues along to the destination. This repeats as many times as the hare is caught. Secondly, disaster hashers are given special disaster hash names. All virgins get named at a disaster hash, usually having to do with the disaster in question, and the disaster hash name is completely separate from an ordinary hash.
- Solo Hash (or sash). A method used by Brighton Hash (BH7) during the Covid pandemic to allow hashing to continue. A route would be laid by a hare in advance and solo (or very small groups) would follow the marks. Usually done virtually using an app.

== Trails ==
Hashing has not strayed far from its roots in Kuala Lumpur (and before that as games 'Hare and Hounds' and 'paper chase'). The hares mark their trail with paper, chalk, sawdust, strings, or colored flour, depending on the environment and weather.

One of the functions of special marks like checks, false trails, check backs, hooks, etc. (see below), is to keep the 'pack' (the 'hounds' or runners) together, as faster runners will usually be the first to find them and so go down false trails, check backs, or are sent to the back by hooks, while the slower runners and walkers will have time to catch up with them.

Special marks may be used to indicate a false trail, a backtrack, a shortcut, or a turn. The most commonly used mark is a "check", indicating that hashers will have to search in any direction to find the continuation of the trail. Trails may contain a "beer check", where the pack stops to consume beer, water, or snacks, allowing any stragglers to catch up to the group.

Trails may pass through any sort of terrain and hashers may run through back alleyways, residential areas, city streets, forests, swamps, deep mud ("shiggy"), or shopping malls; and may climb fences, ford streams, explore storm drains, or scale cliffs in their pursuit of the hare.

=== Signals and terms ===
Hashers often carry horns or whistles to communicate with each other, in addition to verbal communication. Every hash house employs its own set of trail marks, and the names for these marks may vary widely, so newcomers or visitors will have the local markings explained to them before the run at a "chalk talk". The most common term is "on-on", shouted by runners to let others know they are on the right trail. A yell of "R-U?" (pronounced "are you") is a question to other hashers if they are on trail, and should be responded to with either "On-On" or "Looking or Checking."

Sometimes there is a call to "circle up". This is a call from a leader for the hashers to form a circle, be quiet, and pay attention. Circles are called for the "chalk talk", to give news, or for some ceremony such as to thank the hare for the hash.

=== Trail markings ===
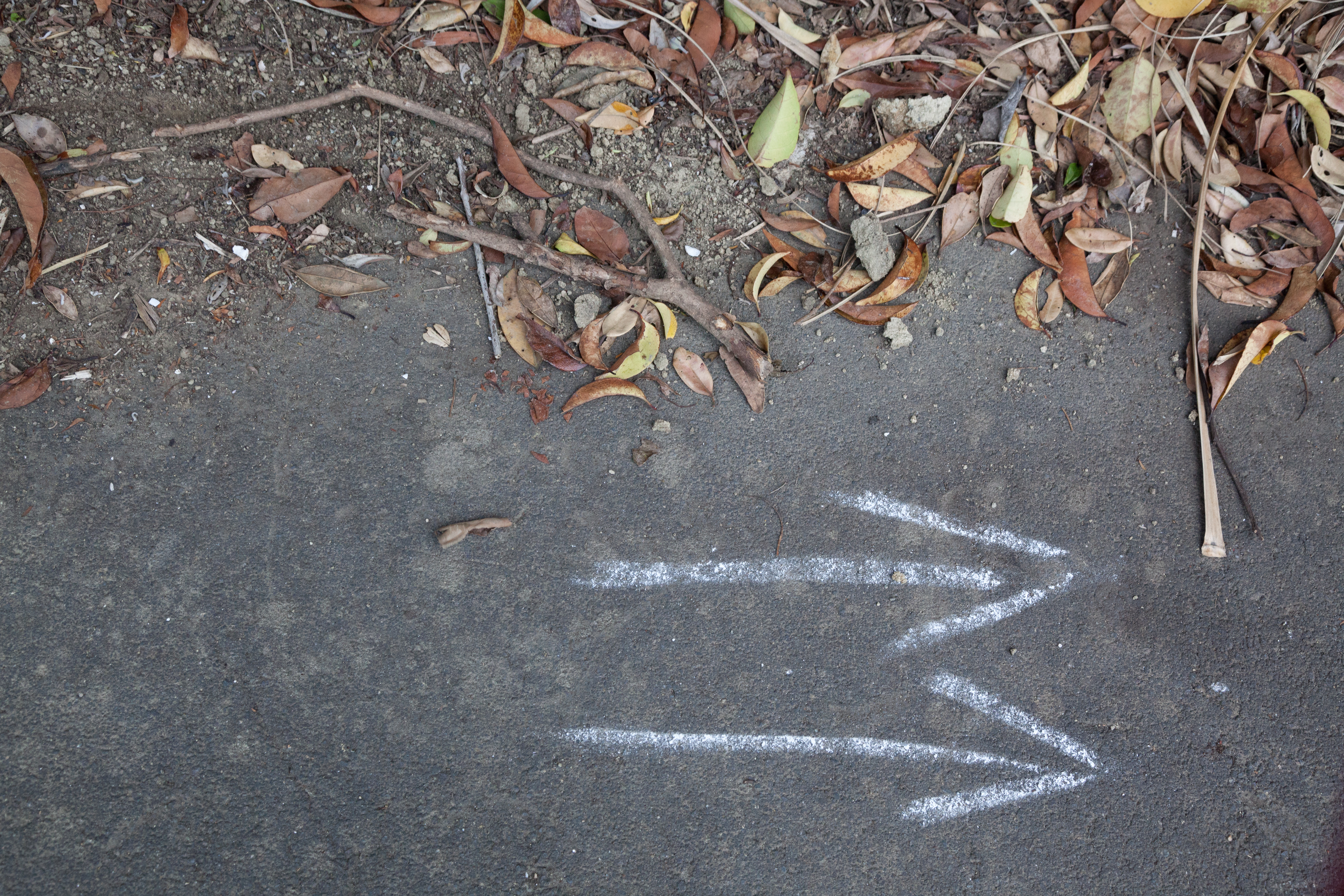
Two chalk arrows on a road surface

Each hare should explain their markings at the start of the trail, as some marks like X or O may have completely different meanings depending on the local custom, and can sometimes even vary from hare to hare within the same kennel.

Many clubs around the world still use shredded or small squares of paper, but due to littering laws and other environmental concerns, most clubs have transitioned to chalk or flour, but other substances may be used too, e.g. sawdust, colored powder, pieces of toilet paper. Trails have been laid in cereal, Kool-Ade, Tang, biodegradable marking ribbon, tape, and even mustard.

Symbol	Description	Meaning
↑, •, |	An arrow, spot, flour blob, or a vertical line	The trail (probably) continues in this direction – unless it is a False trail, that is. (See below.) Some kennels consider an arrow as an indication that one is on True Trail after a Check while others see them as no different than a normal blob of flour, i.e. the pack must still find three of them.
↑≡	An arrow with three lines across it.	True trail. The trail definitely continues in this direction. Sometimes added by the Hare to reassure the pack after checks or on confusing trails.
↿	An arrow that is missing one of the "wings;" a "half arrow".	Pack arrow added by one of the runners as help to other runners. May be right, may be wrong. Could also be an arrow leading to the start of the trail before the run in some kennels.
✕, ◯, ⊗, ⊙, –	An X, O, O with an X, O with a dot, or a horizontal line.	Check: A temporary break in the trail. The pack will have to find where it continues. Often, the Hare may have laid multiple false trails to confuse the pack. To find the true trail, typically the pack must find three marks in a row. It is customary to shout "on one," "on two," "on-on!" when discovering each respective mark. If rules differ, it may be explained before the trail during a custom called "chalk talk." A false trail may end with a "false" mark (see below) or none at all.
✕, F, =, –/↓, ≡	An X, F, or two / three horizontal lines, maybe with an arrow pointing backward	False trail: Go back to the most recent Check and look for True trail in a different direction.
F/YBF or just YBF		An extra special false trail ("You've Been F-ed"). Go back to the most recent Check and look in a different direction.
CB, BC, =, CB/↓	"CB" or "BC" or a double line, maybe with an arrow pointing backward.	Back Check or Check Back. This indicates the pack should go back and look for a side trail branching off somewhere along the way.
◯	An open circle	Depending on the kennel, this may be a check. It may be a 360º whichy-way (see below). It may be a back check. It may be something else. There are no rules.
③, CB 3, (CB 3)/↓	A circle or "CB" + a number, maybe with an arrow pointing backward.	Numbered Back Check / Check Back. The pack should go back as many marks as the number indicates and look for a side trail.
↷	A 'hook' mark with a number adjacent to it	Sometimes called a "fish hook." The first runners, to the number specified at the hook, are to go back to the rear of the pack (often the 'sweep' a hasher assigned to trail the pack to make sure that no one is left alone) before proceeding. e.g. A "↷6" would find the first six runners returning to the back of the pack.
↖︎↗︎	Two or more unmarked arrows pointing in different directions.	Whichy-Way. (Occasionally called a "speed check.") One of the arrows is true, the other is false. One mark will indicate true trail.
↖︎T ↗︎E	Two arrows marked with T and E.	Turkey / Eagle split. The hare is offering a choice. The T will point to a shorter (Turkey) segment of trail, and the E will point to a longer (Eagle) segment. Sometimes the T is marked as a C, standing for Chicken. Sometimes all three are presented.
↖︎SCB	Arrow marked with SCB.	Short Cutting B*s route. Similar to Turkey / Eagle split - the hare is offering a shorter route option.
↖︎R ↗︎W	Two arrows marked with R and W.	R*nners / W*lkers split. If separate Walkers and Runners trails are present then these will be indicated accordingly.
BC, BS, BH, DC, DS, DH, SN, SS		Beer Check / Beer Stop / Beer Here / Drink Check / Drink Stop / Drink Here / Sip (or Shot) Near / Sip (Or Shot) Stop – Any of these can indicate a place on trail wherein the pack will consume some kind of beverage and possibly snacks. The term will vary from kennel to kennel. Sometimes this mark will be preceded by BN or DN.
ON IN, ON INN or ≡	"ON IN", "ON INN" or three horizontal lines.	The end of the trail is near (or at the mark).

=== Trail types ===
There are two types of trails. "Live trails" are laid by hares who are given a head start, while "dead trails" are pre-laid hours or days before the hash begins. Live trails and dead trails are also known as "live hare" and "dead hare" trails respectively. Live trails are closer to the original "hare and hounds" tradition, with the intent of the pack being to catch the hare rather than making it to the end, and are more common in the United States, while the rest of the world tends toward dead trails.

A trail may be "A to A," where the trail returns to the start, or "A to B," where the beginning and end of the trail are widely separated. Some trails are referred to as "A to A′ (prime)," denoting an ending point that is close to (usually short walking distance), but not the same as the start. There is also "B to A," in which the participants are ferried to another location for the run back to the gathering point.

The hash trail depends on the environment of the hash chapter. If there are hills or mountains nearby, that is always the preferred location. Many trails run through rural areas, such as forests, farm areas, jungle, along with or through rivers, etc. In densely populated areas, the hash will often start and finish in a park, and the trails will run on city streets.

== Traditions ==
=== Circles ===
Most hash events end with a group gathering known as "circle", or less commonly as "religion". Led by chapter leadership, the circle provides a time to socialize, sing drinking songs, recognize individuals, formally name members, or inform the group of pertinent news or upcoming events. Circles may be led by the chapter grandmaster (GM), the group's religious advisor (RA), or by a committee. Impromptu input is welcome and solicited.

=== Down-downs ===
A "down-down" is a means of punishing, rewarding, or merely recognizing an individual for any action or behavior according to the customs or whims of the group. Generally, the individual in question is asked to consume without pause the contents of his or her drinking vessel or risk pouring the remaining contents on his or her head. Individuals may be recognized for outstanding service or their status as a visitor or newcomer. Down-downs also serve as punishment for misdemeanors real, imagined, or blatantly made up. Such transgressions may include: failing to stop at the beer check, pointing with a finger, pronouncing the letter "r", or using real names. Commonly, hashers who wear new shoes to an event can be required to drink from that shoe.

Many chapters include an ice seat or throne as part of the down-down ceremony. Those who are to consume a down-down sit on a large block of ice while they await the completion of the down-down song. If the offense that resulted in the down-down is particularly egregious, the hasher may be subjected to a long song with many verses.

=== Hash names ===
In most chapters, the use of real names during an event is discouraged. Members are typically given a "hash name", usually in deference to a particularly notorious escapade, a personality trait, or their physical appearance. In some chapters, the name must be earned – that is, Hashers are not named until they have done something outstanding, unusual, or stupid enough to warrant one. In other chapters, the process is more routine, and Hashers are named after completing a certain number of events (5-10 being the most common) or setting their first run (sometimes referred to as a Virgin Hare).

Naming conventions differ from kennel to kennel, with some focusing on "family-friendly" names (for example: Lost My Way), innuendo (for example, Purple Vein), and some go out of their way to make the name as bawdy, offensive, or politically incorrect as possible. But in general, once named, Hashers will refer to one another by that name at the Hash. More offensive names may be censored in comical ways to comply with the family-friendly tone of some kennels.

Hashers who have not been named are generally referred to as "Just [name]," "No Name [name]" (e.g., "No Name John"), or simply "Virgin."

Naming traditions differ based on kennels. In some, the Grand Master (GM) has the responsibility, while others have the Religious Advisor (RA) do the ceremony. Others still allow the Hares themselves to name the Hasher. In some, the Circle gets to help and shout out suggestions. However, as a general rule, Hashers are not permitted to give themselves a Hash Name due to the obvious conflict of interest. Hashers who do so are often renamed by the chapter at the earliest opportunity and with a more offensive name. Hashers who are named with a name deemed unsatisfactory may be renamed by their kennel or by another kennel. Usually, this backfires as Hashers typically strive to give the complaining Hasher an even more offensive or further inappropriate name. Similarly, new Hashers who pursue a desire for an obviously offensive or inappropriate name may intentionally be given a weaker name, such as "Freckles," "Frog Butt," or "Mr. Poo Poo."

=== Symbols and logos ===
Many Hashes have their own logo for their own Kennel. There are even custom logos made for special events like the [Interhash]. However, due to the running theme, there are many common symbols universally attributed to the Hash that can be seen across multiple items. One such traditional symbol is the outline of a human foot, often including the phrase "On-On."

Hash T-shirts are among the most common things to find at a Hash, and some consider them collection material. Unique Hashes and special events usually have a Hash T-shirt that comes from recognizing participation, and carry the symbols of various Kennels, dates, Hares of the run, event locations, sponsors, and more. A large sample is available in the Digital Hash T-shirt Museum

=== Clothing ===
Hashers occasionally wear specialized clothing on trail or to the closing circles. Common items include thick, knee-high socks (commonly referred to as "Shiggy" socks), kilts, or "happi" coats, while some chapters (aka "kennels" in hare-and-hound chapters) offer "earned" clothing such as bibs or sashes. Shiggy socks are worn to protect the shins and knees of the wearer from thorns, mud, branches, or whatever else they run through. The Hash has its own tartan for members' kilts. Custom happi coats, originating out of Japan, are also commonly seen and made to reflect the local kennel.

=== Hash Hymns ===
Often, kennels will end their ceremonies by singing a hash hymn. At many kennels, this song is a song that celebrates (or denigrates) their own kennel. Others will sing a different song.

"Swing Low, Sweet Chariot" has been used by many kennels for many years as a Hash Hymn. While humorous additions to or renditions of the song itself exist, it is one of the few things that remain consistent throughout the Hashing world. There is some dispute as to the song's origin; however, its persistence in the Hashing world would suggest that it originated from Mother H3 itself, or Royal Selangor Club (RSC), in Malaysia. Many kennels have deliberately stopped this practice due to discomfort with mockery and appropriation, since the song's origins are rooted in U.S. slavery.

== International events ==
There are several international events, where hashers from different groups get together to run and socialize. Still, the most famous is the biennial Interhash, where hashers from around the world gather. The 2006 Interhash—Chiang Mai offered supporting runs in Thailand, Myanmar, Laos, Vietnam, Cambodia, and southwest China.

- 1978 Hong Kong
- 1980 Kuala Lumpur, Malaysia
- 1982 Jakarta, Indonesia
- 1984 Sydney, Australia
- 1986 Pattaya, Thailand
- 1988 Bali, Indonesia
- 1990 Manila, Philippines
- 1992 Phuket, Thailand
- 1994 Rotorua, New Zealand
- 1996 Limassol, Cyprus
- 1998 Kuala Lumpur, Malaysia
- 2000 Hobart, Tasmania, Australia
- 2002 Goa, India
- 2004 Cardiff, Wales
- 2006 Chiang Mai, Thailand
- 2008 Perth, Australia
- 2010 Kuching, Malaysia
- 2012 Jogjakarta, Indonesia
- 2014 Hainan, China
- 2016 Bali, Indonesia
- 2018 Nadi, Fiji
- Cancelled: 2020 Trinidad and Tobago, Trinidad
- 2022 Goa, India - November 2022
- 2024 Queenstown, New Zealand
- 2026 Prambanan-Mendut, Indonesia

In addition to Interhash, there are also many regional and continental hash events, such as the Inter-Americas, InterAfrica, InterGulf, InterScandi, EuroHash, PanAsia and the most recent startup PanSoam (Pan South America). National hash events or "nash hashes" primarily bring together hashers from one particular nation, although visitors from other countries are actively welcomed.

InterAmericas Hashes

- 1984-Costa Rica
- 1985-Atlanta
- 1987-Philadelphia
- 1989-San Diego
- 1991-Waukesha
- 1993-Calgary
- 1995-Orlando
- 1997-Trinidad
- 1999-Pittsburgh
- 2001-Austin
- 2003-Costa Rica
- 2005-Toronto
- 2007-Mexico
- 2009-Colorado
- 2011-Savannah
- 2013-Panama
- 2015-Portland
- 2017-Phoenix
- 2019-HashBoat (Palm Beach, Florida)
- 2021 - postponed to 2023
- 2023-Colombia - canceled
- 2025-New Orleans
