= Ricardo Palma District =

Coordinates: 11.9237°S 76.6649°W

Ricardo Palma
- District
- Interactive map of Ricardo Palma
- Country: Peru
- Region: Lima
- Province: Huarochirí
- Founded: September 15, 1944
- Capital: Ricardo Palma

Government
  - Mayor: Mario Romisoncco (2019-2022)

Area
  - Total: 34.59 km^{2} (13.36 sq mi)
- Elevation: 966 m (3,169 ft)

Population (2017)
  - Total: 6,542
  - Density: 189.1/km^{2} (489.8/sq mi)
- Time zone: UTC-5 (PET)
- UBIGEO: 150714

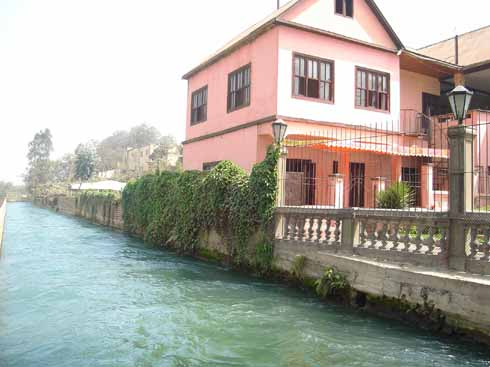
A house in Chosica, situated next to the Rímac River, was photographed in August 2006.

Ricardo Palma District is one of thirty-two districts of the province Huarochirí in Peru.
