= John T. Hash House =

Building in Dayton, Oregon, U.S.

- Monahan House
- U.S. National Register of Historic Places
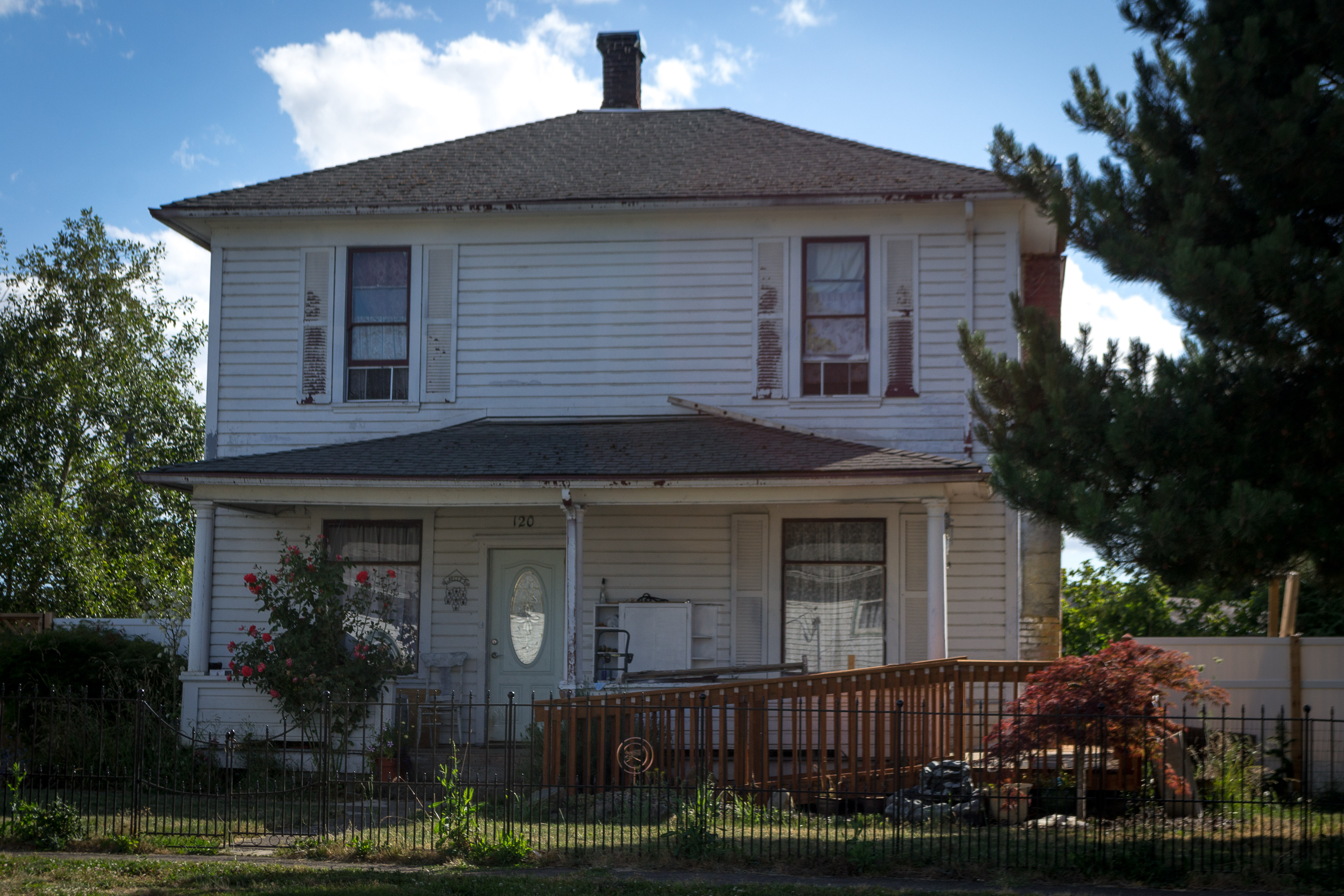

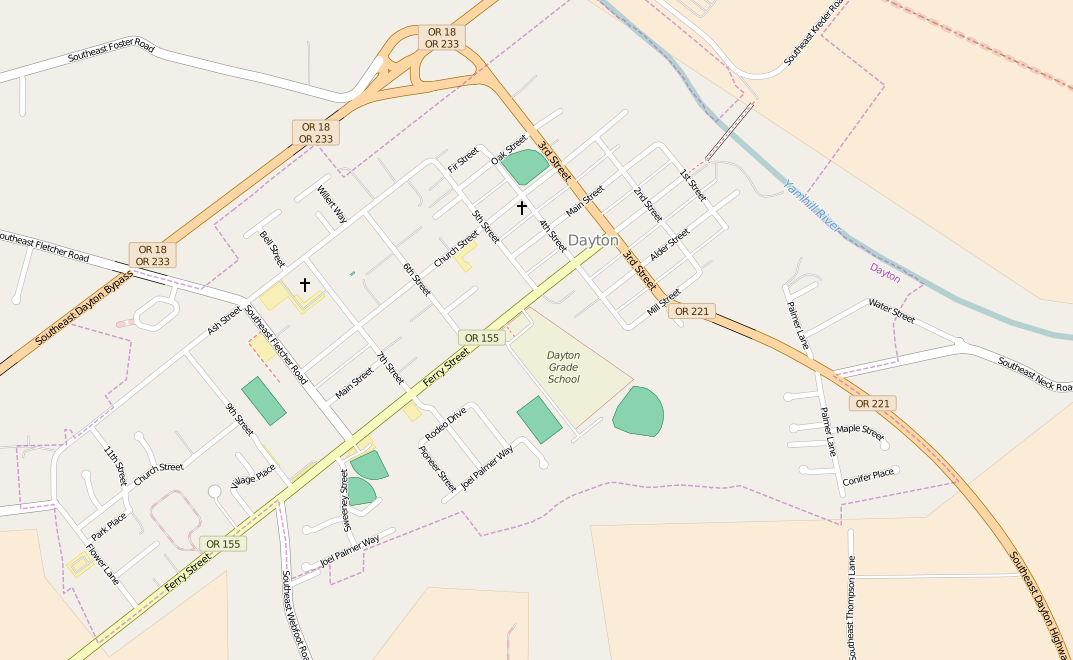
- Location within Dayton OR
- Location: 120 5th Street; Dayton, Oregon
- Coordinates: 45°13′19″N 123°04′51″W
- Built: c. 1912
- Architectural style: Craftsman
- MPS: Dayton MRA
- NRHP reference No.: 87000395
- Added to NRHP: March 16, 1987

John T. Hash House, also known as Monahan House, is a house built in Dayton, Oregon in c. 1912. The property, which also includes a barn as another contributing building, was listed on the National Register of Historic Places in 1987.

The house was deemed significant as "one of the few Craftsman style buildings found in Dayton." As of 1984 the house was in good condition and had undergone only minor alterations from its original form.

The shiplap-sided house has two stories in a square front section, and has a one-story addition at the rear. Its plan is 28 feet (8.5 m) by 62 feet (19 m). The architectural features which make it classifiable as "Craftsman" are not detailed in the available Dayton Historic Resource Survey document about the house, but it is noted that first-floor windows have crown moldings, that the front door has ornamental woodwork and an oval glass-light, and that the porch is supported by three classical, turned columns.
