= Rímac River =

Peruvian river

Rímac
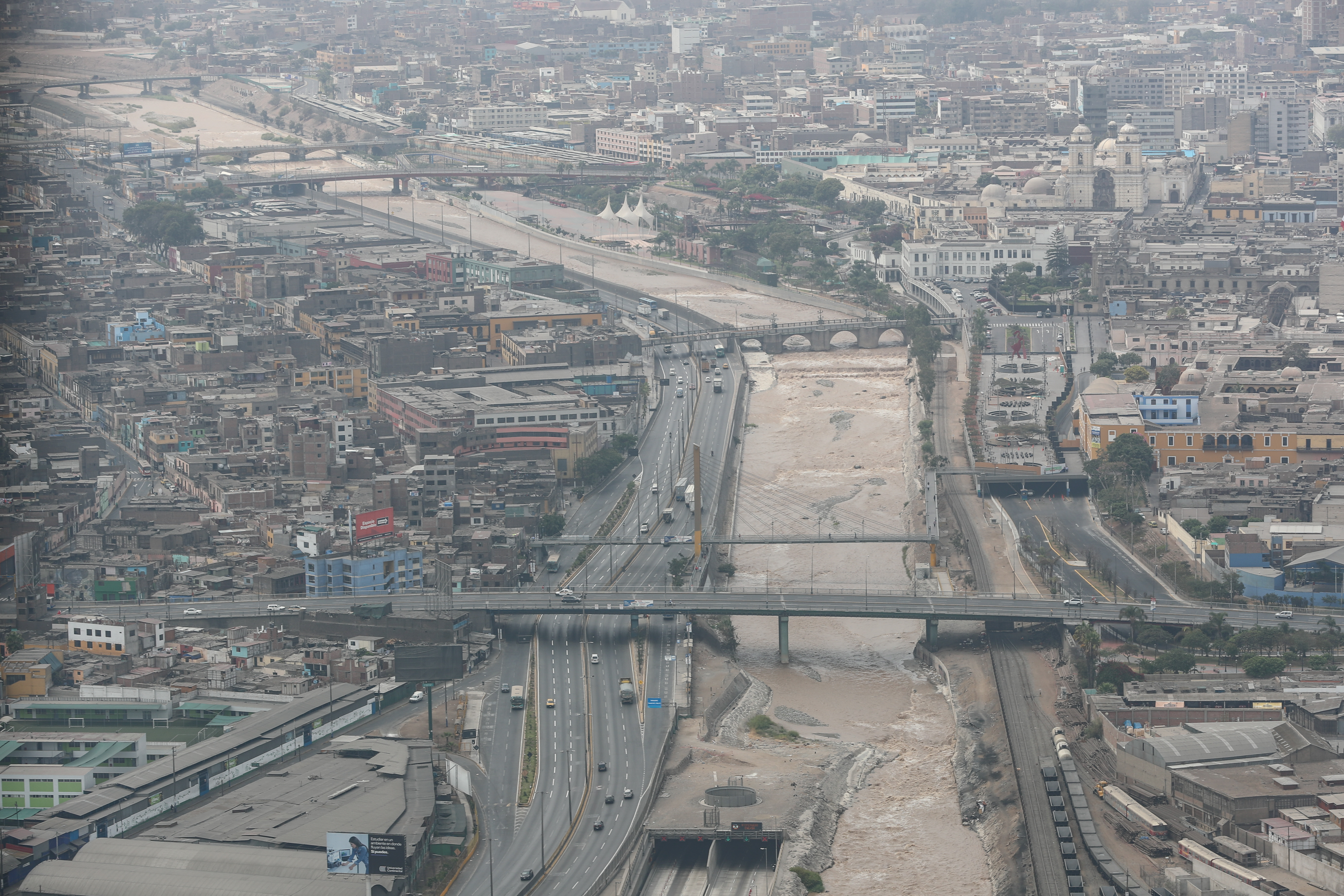
- View of the river in central Lima

- Location of mouth
- Etymology: Quechua
- Native name: Rimaq (Quechua)

Location
- Country: Peru
- Department: Lima

Physical characteristics
- Source: Nevado Paca
  - location: Huarochirí Province, Peru
  - elevation: 5,100 m (16,700 ft)
- Mouth: Pacific Ocean
  - location: Peru
  - coordinates: 11.94730°S 76.70792°W
- Length: 204 km (127 mi)
- Basin size: 3,400 km^{2} (1,300 sq mi)
- Discharge
  - average: 25.8 m^{3}/s (910 cu ft/s)

Basin features
- Tributaries
  - left: Yuraqmayu

The Rímac River [ˈri.mak] is located in western Peru and is the most important source of potable water for the Lima and Callao Metropolitan Area. It belongs to the Pacific Slope, into which it flows after bathing the cities of Lima and Callao, together with the Chillón River, to the north, and the Lurín River, to the south. It is 204 km long and has a basin of 3,312 km², of which 2,237.2 km² is a humid basin. The basin has a total of 191 lagoons, of which only 89 have been studied. The river begins in the highlands of the Huarochirí Province in the Lima Region and its mouth is located in Callao, near Jorge Chávez International Airport.

The river runs through the Rímac Valley (Spanish: Valle del Rímac), one of three valleys in the city of Lima. The city of Lima is located on the delta-shaped valley, as are various towns such as Matucana, Ricardo Palma, Chosica, Chaclacayo and Vitarte, small cities that function as strategic points between the coast and central mountains of Peru. It has a total surface of 3,700 km^{2}.

== Etymology ==
Map of Lima in 1744 featuring the river.

The name Rímac is from the Quechua word rimaq, meaning "speaker, speaking", leading to it being nicknamed El Río Hablador ("the talking river"). This name originates from the fact that a culture called Pachacámac existed in the Lima area. They built some galleries on the edge of the river with a space where a priest could enter without being seen. The inhabitants approached the river that was considered an apu (deity) and consulted it about their inquiries, all in front of said gallery built for it. The priest responded from within, to make believe that it was the river itself that was speaking. This is quite possible the origin of why the Rímac River is called Río Hablador.

In addition, however, and according to a legend, its origin is based on the sacrifice of Rímac, the son of the god Inti, and his sister Chaclla, to free men from a drought. And that if you find yourself on the river bank, you will hear his voice telling stories, hence the name.

The Spanish misunderstood the word Rímac as Lima, which led to the city receiving the latter name, as a derivation of it because its pronunciation had been deformed. However, the term Limaq, without being appropriate in highland Quechua, seems to have been the original in the coastal varieties of Quechua and also in the Mochica language, which preceded Quechua in that area.

== Geography ==
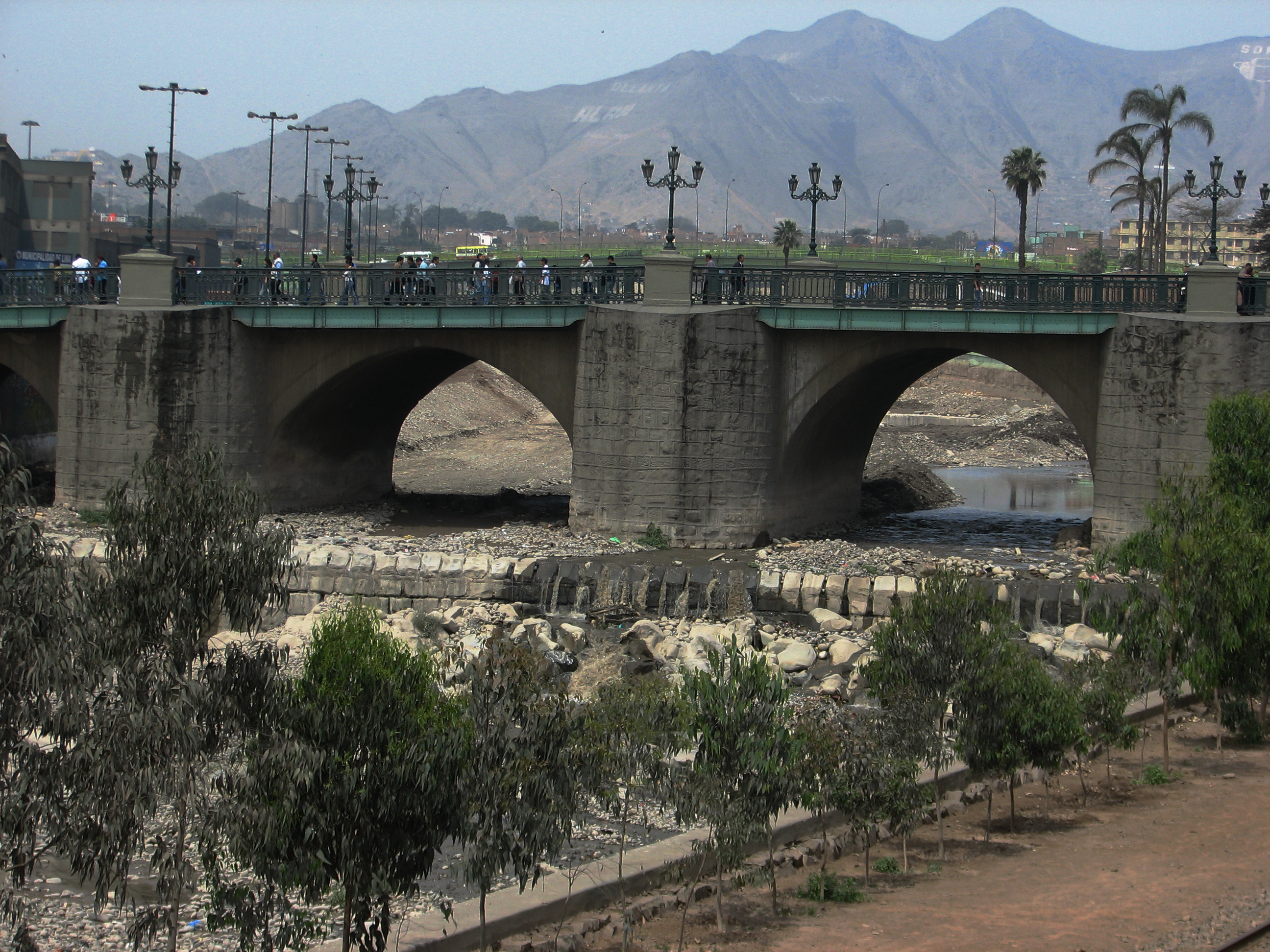
The Puente de Piedra crossing the Rímac.

The Rímac River begins its journey on the western slope of the Andes mountain range at an altitude of approximately 5,508 mamsl in the Nevado Paca, touring the provinces of Lima and Huarochirí, both located in the department of Lima. Among the most important tributaries of the Rímac are the Santa Eulalia River, the San Mateo or Alto Rímac River and the Blanco River.

Parallel to the Rímac River runs the Central Highway and a railway line, which starting from the port of Callao, reaches the city of La Oroya in the department of Junín, to later divide into two (one to the south and the other to the north), but not before going through the Abra de Anticona, better known as Ticlio, located at 4840 mamsl. In its basin we can also find the water treatment plant for Lima, called La Atarjea, managed by the Lima Drinking Water and Sewerage Service Public Company (SEDAPAL), in addition to the hydroelectric power plants of Huampaní Hydroelectric Power Plant, Matucana (also known as Pablo Boner Hydroelectric Power Plant), Huinco Hydroelectric Power Plant, Barbablanca Hydroelectric Power Plant, and Juan Carossio (also known as Moyopampa Hydroelectric Power Plant), all operated by Enel Perú (formerly EDEGEL).

At the height of the city of Lima, the Rímac is crossed by several bridges, the best known of which is the tercentenary Puente de Piedra (wrongly called "Puente Trujillo" today, which is the one next to it), built in the time of viceroy Juan de Mendoza y Luna, Marquis of Montesclaros in 1610, when Peru was part of the Spanish Empire.

On its margins, in the part of the mountains, several tourist restaurants, vacation and recreation centers can be found, as well as a series of clubs, which serve as escape points for the people of Lima in the cold and humid winters. Likewise, several picturesque towns can be found, such as Chosica, Matucana (capital of Huarochirí), San Bartolomé, San Mateo de Huanchor, Ricardo Palma and San Jerónimo de Surco.

A total of 27 mining operations are located in the Rímac river basin, of which seven continue to operate and the other 20 are closed or abandoned. The districts of Chicla, San Mateo, Matucana, Surco, Huanza and Carampoma in Huarochirí are the ones with the highest concentration of work. The most prominent mining centers in the area are Casapalca, Tamboraque, Millontingo, Pacococha, Colqui, Venturosa, Caridad, Lichicocha and Cocachacra.

== Flow ==
The "maximum discharge in 24 hours", which occurred in the Rímac river and registered at the Chosica station, amounts to 385 m³/s (in 1941) and was only repeated on another occasion with 380 m³/s (in 1955) (since there was a record of less than 120 years, the risks of extrapolating are high). However, according to some investigations, an exceptional discharge occurred on March 29, 1925, estimated at 600 m³/s.

The decrease in the flow of the Rímac during the dry season, in addition to the constant growth of Lima, prevented a good supply of drinking water in the city. For this reason, in 1962 the Peruvian government carried out the water transfer project from the Marcapomacocha lagoon, which belongs to the Mantaro river basin, through a 10-kilometre siphon-shaped tunnel at 4,000 mamsl that crosses several glaciers.

== Rímac reserved zone ==
In 1998, the Reserved Zone of the Rímac River Valley was created, which is located between the districts of Lima, Chaclacayo, San Juan de Lurigancho and Ate of the Province of Lima, and tries to take care of the cleanliness and landscape environment of area. Its extension is the one that covers a strip of 28 km. Currently, work is being done on its margins, in different areas, in order to recover its beauty, which has been greatly diminished in recent decades since it is used as a garbage dump by the inhabitants of its margins, in addition to being the draining place of sewage systems.

This area is home to species of fauna such as the Falco sparverius, which uses the waterfalls of the ravines as resting and stalking places. On the banks of rivers with low vegetation, birds such as the gargantuan duck (Anas bahamensis), herons such as the Egretta thula, the Eudocimus albus, the Bubulcus ibis and the Nycticorax nycticorax have been found.

== Proposed projects ==
The river and its surroundings have been the target of several projects, be they to improve the quality of the river or to build structures, such as esplanades surrounding it.

Name	Year	Description
Puerto de Lima	19th century	Proposal by the Condado de la Vega del Ren noble family to channelise the river to create a Port of Lima. The family's palace was designed as part of this project, ultimately abandoned.
Project by Felipe Arancivia	1872–1889	Urbanisation plan that intended to channel the land between Balta Bridge and the Stone Bridge between 1872 and 1899. Projected by engineer Felipe Arancivia, a miscalculation of the budget led to its cancellation in 1909.
Malecón del Rímac	1920s	During the second government of Augusto Leguía, a promenade (also known as the Alameda or Malecón Leguía) was developed, in order to beautify the cutwater of the river during the 1920s. However, it would be demolished at the end of the century.
Gran Parque del Río Hablador	1990s	Part of the Plan Maestro Centro de Lima al 2010, one of several proposals during the 1990s.
Proyecto Las Lagunas del Rímac	2009	It would seek to convert the riverbanks into ecological lungs, by forming artificial lakes (10 small rectangular lagoons), between the Balta and Santa Rosa bridges, which will adorn the Rímac Malecón, forming a Cultural Corridor of the Historic Center together with the Parque de la Muralla and the University Park. Also in that year, efforts were made to channel parts of the section of the River.
Proyecto Río Verde	2011	During the management of Susana Villarán, by the urban architect Augusto Ortiz de Zevallos, the project, also known as the Vía Parque Rímac, was proposed, which sought to recover the banks of the river by redirecting it in order to gain land in the riverside for the creation of a 25-hectare park of green areas with riverside bridges and the development of recreational circuits (such as a theatre for 8,000 people and a Central Park of Lima, known as the Cantagallo Grand Recreational Park), including an artificial lagoon, small squares, avenues and swimming pools public fed with river water. A housing program for the Shipibo community of Cantagallo was also included. However, the management of Luis Castañeda suspended it for the by-pass project of the Vía expressa Línea Amarilla (an underground tunnel that crosses the Rímac that managed to inaugurate in 2018). Although the current mayor of Lima, Rafael López Aliaga, has considered its reactivation in 2023.
Proposal by Martín Vizcarra	March 2017	Due to the El Niño phenomenon, Vizcarra proposed channeling three kilometres of the river to avoid overflows and road collapses due to landslides in sections of the Central Highway.
Parque Fluvial Rímac	2017	The Lima Design Network proposed a contest of ideas under the name for which several architects from competing universities had to propose projects to save the relationship between the river and the city at an urban and public services level, in order to safeguard the limits between nature and the appropriation of man.
Proyecto Especial Paisajístico Río Rímac	2012–present	Part of the Plan Maestro del Centro Histórico de Lima al 2035, through which the Metropolitan Municipality of Lima seeks its recovery as a water, urban and historical landscape, as well as developing it as a metropolitan ecological corridor. In 2012, the government of South Korea was invited in a project for the recovery of the Rimac and the Huaycoloro River, due to its experience with the four rivers that pass through Daegu, a delay was estimated ten years for recovery. In 2013, a project was proposed by the municipalities of San Mateo and Chaclacayo, with the support of the National Water Authority (ANA). In 2015, the final report of the Korean government was presented, through the South Korean International Cooperation Agency (KOICA), and new agreements were signed, selecting the companies K-water, Yooshin Eng. and Pyunghwa Eng. The estamated cost was US$1 billion. A Master Plan was re-proposed in 2017 to reuse the river's treated water in the Taboada Wastewater Treatment Plant, estimating a delay of two to three years. In 2021, research was carried out by Aquafondo to study the water quality in the Chirilu region (Rio Chillon, Rimac and Lurín) for the development of the project, and the CAF was invited to finance the work.

== See also ==
- List of rivers of Peru
- List of rivers of the Americas by coastline
