= Surco District, Huarochirí =

Coordinates: 11°53′06″S 76°26′33″W

Surco
- District
- Interactive map of Surco
- Country: Peru
- Region: Lima
- Province: Huarochirí
- Founded: September 15, 1920
- Capital: Surco

Government
  - Mayor: Fredy Flores Sedano (2019-2022)

Area
  - Total: 102.58 km^{2} (39.61 sq mi)
- Elevation: 2,018 m (6,621 ft)

Population (2017)
  - Total: 1,407
  - Density: 13.72/km^{2} (35.52/sq mi)
- Time zone: UTC-5 (PET)
- UBIGEO: 150732

Surco District is one of thirty-two districts of the province Huarochirí in Peru.
