= Chaclacayo =

District in Lima, Peru

- District
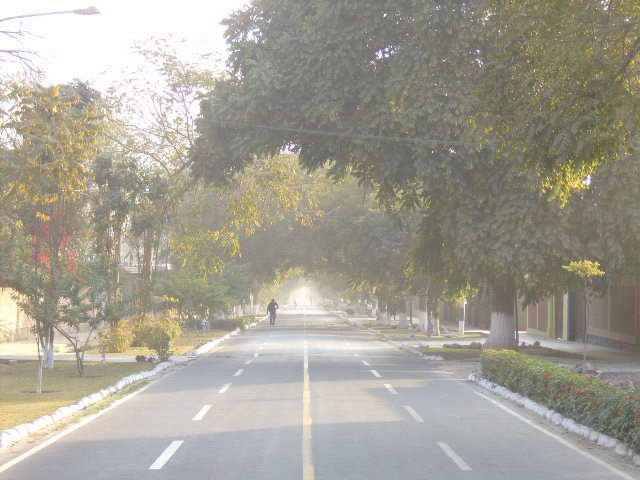
- Chaclacayo Street

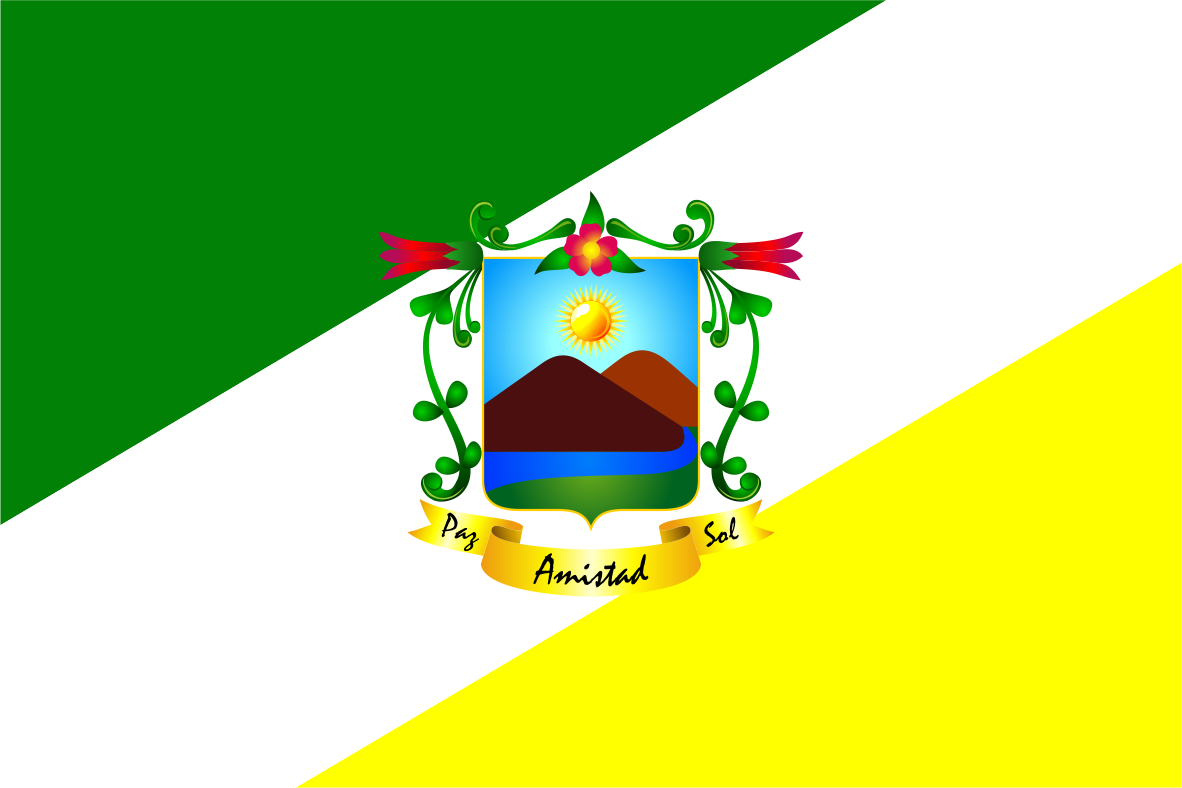
- Flag Coat of arms

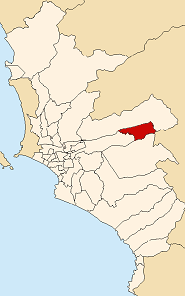
- Location of Chaclacayo in the Lima province
- Coordinates: 11°59′S 76°46′W
- Country: Peru
- Region: Lima
- Province: Lima
- Founded: April 24, 1940
- Capital: Chaclacayo
- Subdivisions: 1 populated center

Government
  - Mayor: Sergio Baigorria (2023–2026)

Area
  - Total: 39.5 km^{2} (15.3 sq mi)
- Elevation: 647 m (2,123 ft)

Population (2023)
  - Total: 46,225
  - Density: 1,170/km^{2} (3,030/sq mi)
- Time zone: UTC-5 (PET)
- UBIGEO: 150107
- Website: munichaclacayo.gob.pe

Chaclacayo is a district of the Lima Province in Peru. Together with Chosica, Chaclacayo is the natural exit district to Central Peru, east of Lima, through the Carretera Central (Central Highway).

== Location ==
Chaclacayo is located at an elevation of 647 m and at the 17th km mark of the Carretera Central, the main road headed East starting in the Lima urban center. Borders: North: Rimac River and Lurigancho (Chosica) South: Cieneguilla West: Ate East: Lurigancho (Chosica)

== History ==
During the colonial era (17th-18th centuries), the corregimiento De la Buena Muerte executed its functions from Chaclacayo. It was then that began the formation of the nine estates that, with the passing of time, would originate the district.

== Geography ==
Chaclacayo is located in the valley of the Rímac River that runs from the Peruvian Andes to the Pacific Ocean. Its weather is typical of the Coastal Andes: During summertime (from December to February) it is warm and sometimes rainy; the rest of the year it is usually sunny, with average temperatures between 14 and 20 °C. The coldest months are June and July, when temperatures can drop to 12 °C.

== Name ==
The name is derived from an Aymara word that means "at the foot of the carrizo". Carrizo is a plant that grows by the Rimac's riverside.

== Main attractions ==
Places to visit in Chaclacayo are the Parque Central, the central park of the district. Around the park there are other landmarks: a well-known bakery, an Evangelical church, a bazaar, and the Chaclacayo District Council.

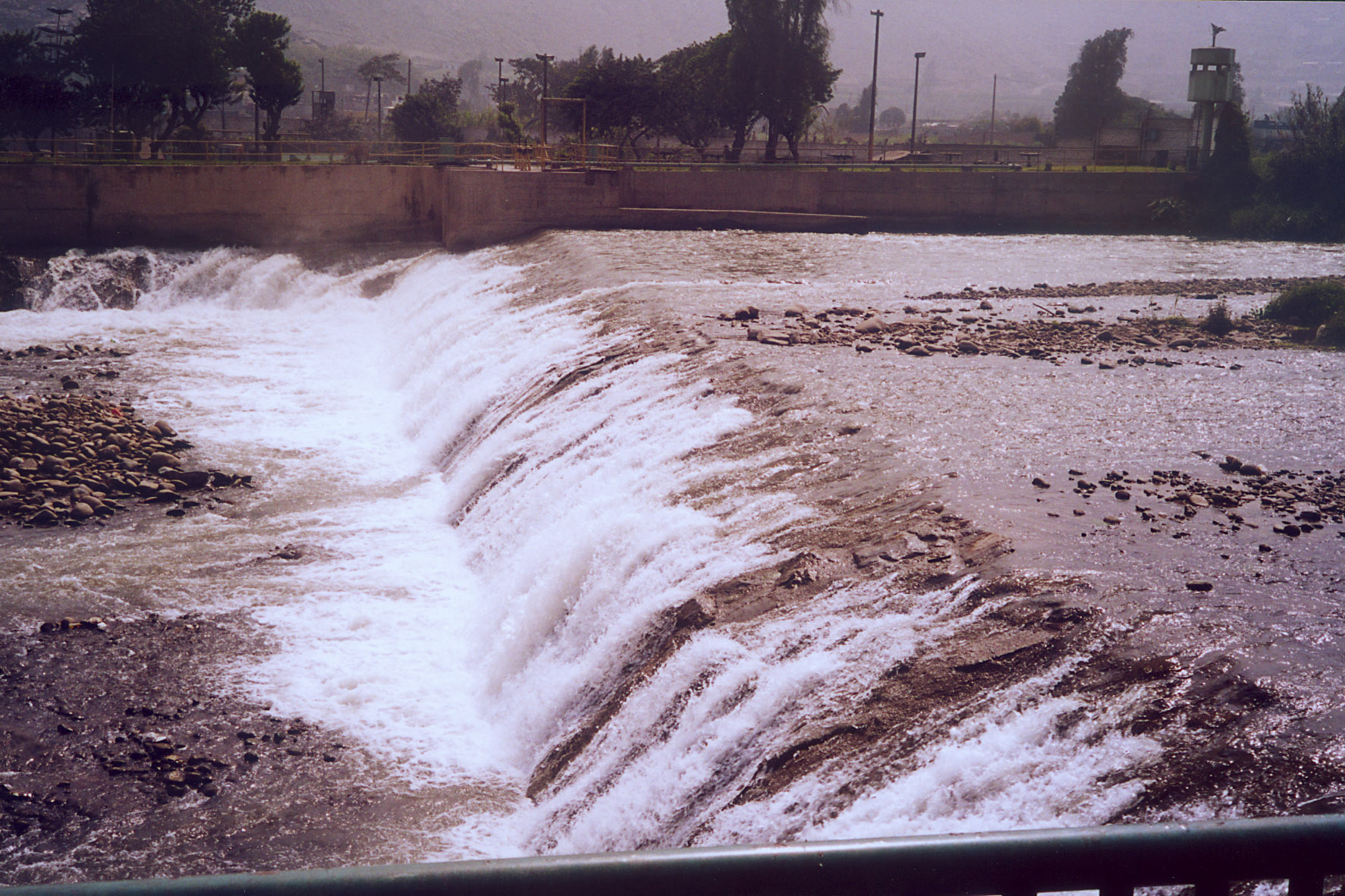
River Rimac, open water areas

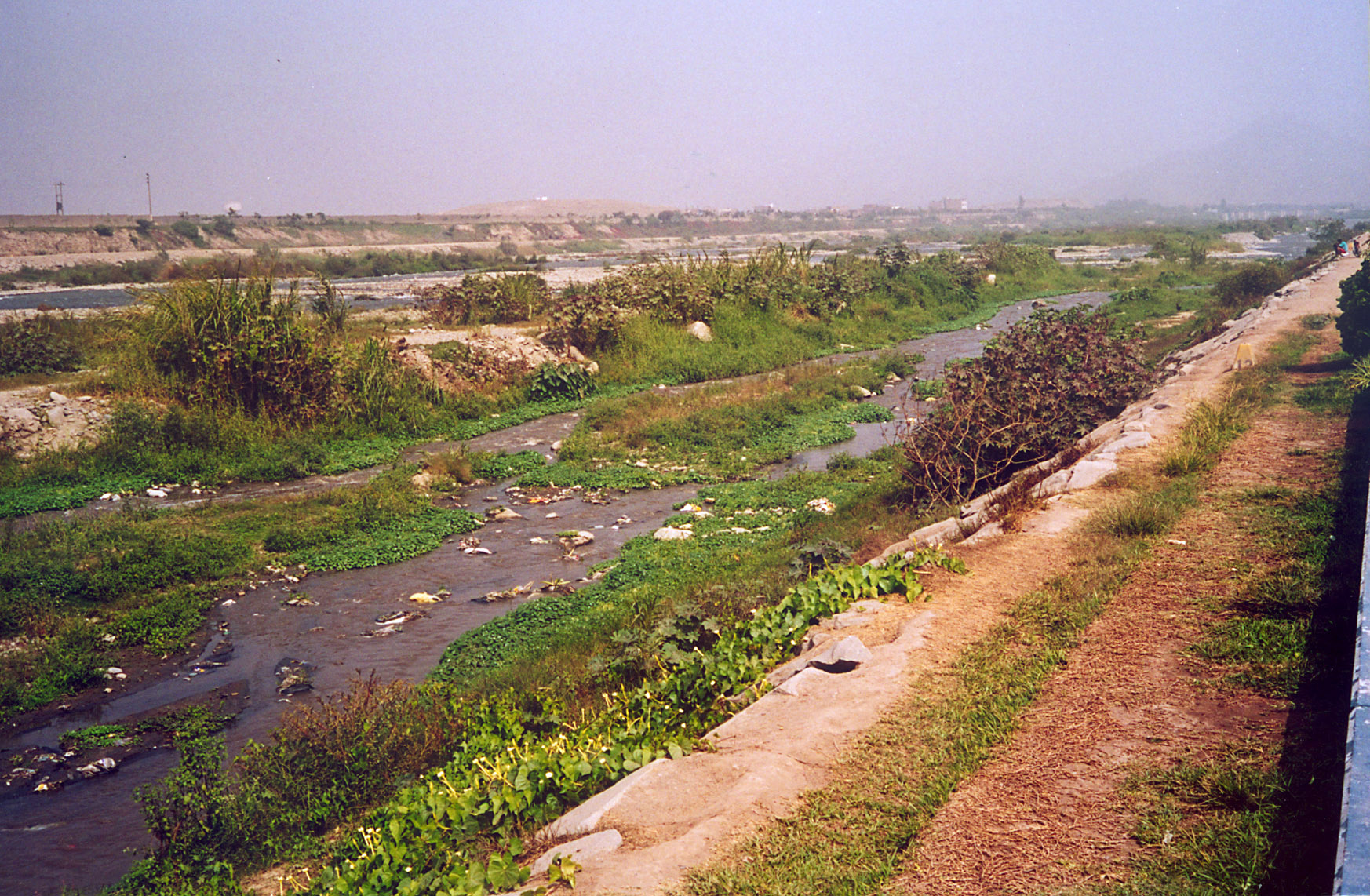
River Rimac, river basin

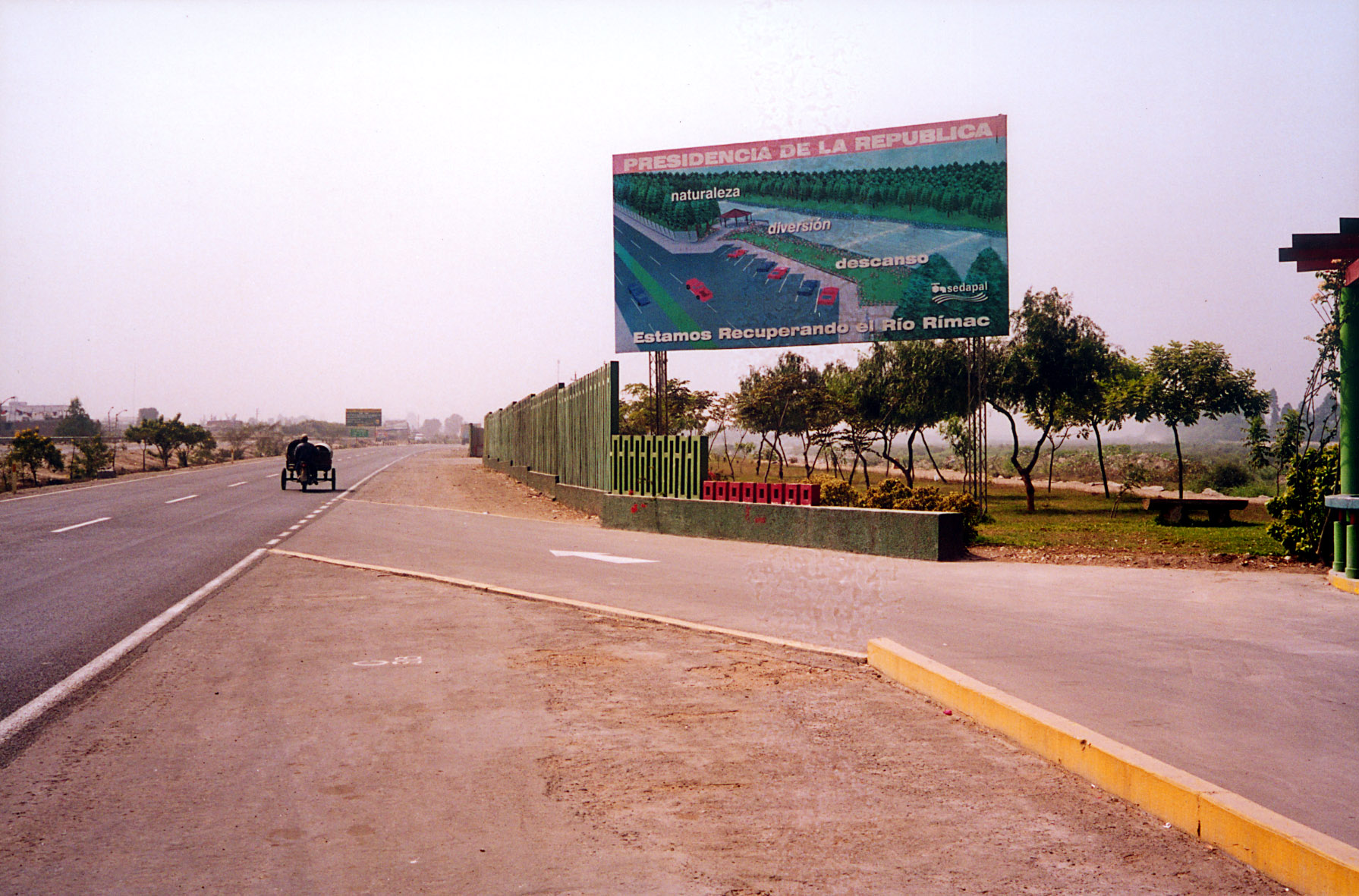
River Rimac, restoration work

== Neighborhoods ==
- Urban Context
  - La Floresta
  - Alfonso Cobian
  - Vírgen de Fátima de Morón
  - Huascata
  - Miguel Grau
  - Villa Rica (villarica9.webnode.es)
  - Santa Rosa
  - Villa Mercedes
  - Santa Ines
  - Los Cóndores
  - Morón
  - Ñaña
  - Huascata
  - La Tapada
  - 3 de Octubre
- Residential Clubs
  - El Cuadro
  - Los Cóndores

== Miscellaneous ==
Due to the district's irregular shape, there is often confusion regarding the jurisdiction of nearby towns such as Huampaní and Ñaña. While some consider these towns part of Chaclacayo, only the areas located beyond the bridge fall within Chaclacayo's boundaries. The sections located before the bridge are part of the neighboring district of Lurigancho.

== Chaclacayo Group ==
The Chaclacayo Group was an arts collective of queer artists founded in Chaclacayo in 1982 by Sergio Zevallos, Raúl Avellaneda and Helmut Psotta. The collective sought to challenge gender binarism and violence amongst other things in the late 1980s and early 1990s.

== See also ==
- Administrative divisions of Peru
