= Hash =

Hash, hashes, hash mark, or hashing may refer to:

== Substances ==
- Hash (food), a coarse mixture of ingredients, often based on minced meat
- Hash (stew), a pork and onion-based gravy found in South Carolina
- Fossil hash, a rock composed primarily of fragmented fossils
- Hash, a nickname for hashish, a cannabis product

== Marks and symbols ==
- Number sign (#), also known as the hash, hash mark, or (in American English) pound sign
  - Checkmate symbol in chess
- Hatch marks, hash marks or tick marks, a form of mathematical notation
  - The individual markings on a graduation (scale)
  - Hash mark (sports), a similar marking on hockey rinks and gridiron football fields
- Service stripe, a military and paramilitary decoration
- Tally mark, a counting notation

== Computing ==
- Hash function, a small, fixed-size pseudorandom index derived in a deterministic way from data; used in hash tables and cryptography
  - Cryptographic hash function, a hash function used to authenticate message integrity
    - Hash chain, a method of producing many single-use keys from a master key or password
  - Geohash, a spatial data structure which subdivides space into buckets of grid shape
  - Hash table, a data structure using hash functions
    - hash (Unix), an operating system command for manipulating a hash table
  - Zobrist hashing, a method of hashing chess positions into a key
- URI fragment, in computer hypertext, a string of characters that refers to a subordinate resource

== Other uses ==
- Hash (EP) ([#]), a 2020 EP by Loona

== See also ==
- Fossil hash, a rock composed primarily of fragmented fossils
- Hachis parmentier, a name for shepherd's pie
- Hash browns
- Hash House (disambiguation)
- Hashtag, a form of metadata often used on social networking websites
- Hatching, graphic procedure and pattern
- All pages with or
