= Hash House Bikers =

International Group of Non-competitive Bicycling Club

Hash House Bikers (also known as bike hashers, or bashers) is an international group of non-competitive bicycling, social, and drinking clubs referred to as chapters or kennels. An event organized by a kennel is known as a bike bash or bash, with participants often calling themselves bashers. Bike hashing is an offshoot of the popular Hash House Harriers running club.

The concept of bike hashing is not new. Walter Rye, President of Thames Hare and Hounds, likely alluded to it in 1887, not long after introduction of the safety bicycle: "Another feature which has tended to lower the sport, is the ridiculous number of prizes given in steeplechases, and the 'pewters' and medals presented to the first men in, or first bicyclist in, and so on, in ordinary runs."

Singapore Bike Hash has claims to be the longest-running bike hash chapter or kennel in the world, having started in July 1989 and still active today. Bangkok Hash House Bikers is not far behind, having been formed in 1992 and attracting a strong contingent every month.

The Orlando Bike-O-Psycho bike hash started in July 1991 after Other Orlando Hash-House Harriers (O2H3) "ran" a few hashes on bikes, the last being their run #257 earlier in June. Don Burlinson, aka Missing Link, had an "aha" moment and decided to form a separate bike hash kennel. He collaborated with two hashers who were proprietors of a local bike shop, Cycle Path, and started the bash: the first bike hash kennel in the western hemisphere.
