= Jorge Chávez Chaparro =

Peruvian university teacher

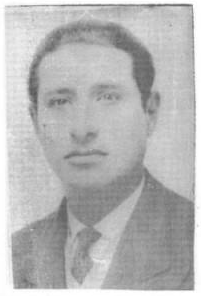

Rector of the University of Cuzco
- In office 1961 – April 27, 1966

Personal details
- Born: January 19, 1911; Cuzco, Peru
- Died: April 27, 1966 (aged 55); Tomas District, Peru

Jorge Chávez Chaparro (Cuzco; January 19, 1911 — Santísima Trinidad de Tomas; April 27, 1966) was a Peruvian educator who served as rector of the National University of Saint Anthony the Abbot in Cuzco from 1961 until his death. He was one of the victims aboard LANSA Flight 501.

== Biography ==
Chávez was born in Cuzco on January 19, 1911, to parents Manuel Chávez Dueñas and Lucía Chaparro Pareja, sister of politician David Chaparro Pareja. He studied at the National School of Sciences and Arts of Cuzco and at the University of Cuzco, where he obtained the degrees of doctor in physical and natural sciences and secondary school teacher, with a specialty in biology (1947–8).

He started working as a professor of the university on May 1, 1940. He worked as professor of the university's faculty of sciences, and as vice-rector from 1956 to 1957. He was distinguished with the classes of the same faculty (1960–61) and of the college of "Las Mercedes" (1940), bearing his name. He worked on the Revista Universitaria, the university's official magazine, writing articles such as: Cursos Principales de Mamíferos del Cuzco y su distribución Zoogeográfica and Apuntes para la Mitología del Cuzco.

He was a member of the Cuzco Scientific Society (Spanish: Sociedad Científica Cuzco). Starting in 1961, he was Rector of the university, belonging to sports and cultural institutions in both Cuzco and Lima. During his tenure as rector, he founded the Fortunato L. Herrera Mixed Application School, which operates under the university.

Chávez was aboard LANSA Flight 501 headed to Lima in order to collect funds for the university when it crashed with no survivors on April 27, 1966. Alongside him were colleagues treasurer César Enríquez Cabrera and accountant José Grajeda Navarrete. A ceremony in their memory was held on the university on May 1, with their bodies present.

Prior to his death, he lived in Kcanchipata street and was married to Tula Gonzáles, with whom he had five children: Jorge, Manuel, David, Lino and Hugo.

== See also ==
- David Chaparro Pareja, maternal uncle and fellow rector of the university from 1938 to 1943
