= Uman (Peru) =

Mountain in Peru

- Location within Peru

Highest point
- Elevation: 5,431 m (17,818 ft)
- Coordinates: 12°10′39″S 75°55′00″W

Geography
- Location: Peru, Lima Region
- Parent range: Andes, Cordillera Central

Uman (Quechua uma head, -n a suffix, also spelled Umán) is a 5,431-metre-high (17,818 ft) mountain in the Cordillera Central in the Andes of Peru. It is located in the Lima Region, Yauyos Province, on the border of the districts of Miraflores and Tanta. Uman lies west of a lake named Pisququcha and northeast of Wayna Qutuni, Qutuni and Altarniyuq.
