= Ukru Ukru =

Mountain in Peru

- Location within Peru

Highest point
- Elevation: 4,800 m (15,700 ft)
- Coordinates: 12°06′24″S 75°59′45″W

Geography
- Location: Peru, Lima Region
- Parent range: Andes, Cordillera Central

Ukru Ukru (Quechua ukru hole, pit, hollow, the reduplication indicates that there is a complex of something, "many holes", also spelled Ucroucro) is a mountain in the Cordillera Central in the Andes of Peru which reaches a height of approximately 4,800 metres (15,748 ft). It is located in the Lima Region, Yauyos Province, Tanta District. Ukru Ukru lies northwest of Paqarin Pawka and Saqsa and north of Muki at a lake named Pawqarqucha.
