= Madean =

Madean may refer to:

- Madean Peak, a mountain in Alaska
- Madean District, a district in Peru
