= Miraflores District, Yauyos =

Coordinates: 12.2742°S 75.8503°W

Miraflores District
- District
- Interactive map of Miraflores District
- Country: Peru
- Region: Lima
- Province: Yauyos
- Founded: March 13, 1936
- Capital: Miraflores

Government
  - Mayor: Lennin Oscar Santiago Davila

Area
  - Total: 226.24 km^{2} (87.35 sq mi)
- Elevation: 3,660 m (12,010 ft)

Population (2017)
  - Total: 229
  - Density: 1.01/km^{2} (2.62/sq mi)
- Time zone: UTC-5 (PET)
- UBIGEO: 151021

Miraflores District is one of thirty-three districts of the province Yauyos in Peru.

== Geography ==
The Miraflores District lies in the Nor Yauyos-Cochas Landscape Reserve. The Cordillera Central traverses the district. Some of the highest mountains of the district are listed below:

- Altarniyuq
- Anqash Punta
- Hatun Pawka
- Isku Isku
- K'isi Kancha
- Llunk'uti
- Millpu K'uchu
- Paqarin Pawka
- Qutuni
- Uman
- Uqish Punta
- Wamalla
- Waman Challpi
- Wayta Wirta
- Winsu
- Yawli Pampa
