= Saqsa (Yauyos) =

Mountain in Peru

- Location within Peru

Highest point
- Elevation: 4,800 m (15,700 ft)
- Coordinates: 12°07′18″S 75°58′53″W

Geography
- Location: Peru, Lima Region
- Parent range: Andes, Cordillera Central

Saqsa (Quechua for multi-colored, also spelled Sagsa) is a mountain in the Cordillera Central in the Andes of Peru which reaches a height of approximately 4,800 metres (15,748 ft). It is located in the Lima Region, Yauyos Province, Tanta District. Saqsa lies northwest of Paqarin Pawka at a lake named Ch'uspiqucha.
