= T'uru =

Mountain in Peru

- Location within Peru

Highest point
- Elevation: 5,100 m (16,700 ft)
- Coordinates: 12°36′24″S 75°45′53″W

Geography
- Location: Peru, Lima Region
- Parent range: Andes, Cordillera Central

T'uru (Quechua for mud, also spelled Toro) is a mountain in the Cordillera Central in the Andes of Peru which reaches an altitude of approximately 5,100 m (16,700 ft). It is situated in the Lima Region, Yauyos Province, in the districts of Colonia and Huantan. T'uru lies southeast of Upyanqa and Wankarqucha east of the lake named Wankarqucha. There is a little lake southeast of the mountain which is named Chullumpiqucha ("lake of the white-tufted grebe", Hispanicized spelling Chullumpicocha).
