= Altarniyoc =

Mountain in Peru

- Location within Peru

Highest point
- Elevation: 5,346 m (17,539 ft)
- Coordinates: 12°12′55″S 75°56′13″W

Geography
- Location: Peru, Lima Region
- Parent range: Andes, Cordillera Central

Altarniyoc (Spanish altar altar, possibly from Quechua -ni, -yuq suffixes, "the one with an altar") is a 5,356-metre-high (17,572 ft) mountain in the Cordillera Central in the Andes of Peru. It is located in the Lima Region, Yauyos Province, on the border of the districts of Miraflores and Tanta. Altarniyoc lies southeast of a lake named Piscococha, southwest of the peak of Uman and northeast of Huayna Cotoni and Ticlla of the Pichcahuajra mountain range.
