= Llamayuq (Lima) =

Mountain in Peru

- Location within Peru

Highest point
- Elevation: 4,800 m (15,700 ft)
- Coordinates: 12°28′23″S 75°38′27″W

Geography
- Location: Peru, Lima Region
- Parent range: Andes, Cordillera Central

Llamayuq (Quechua llama llama, -yuq a suffix, "the one with a llama (or llamas)", also spelled Llamayoc) is a mountain in the Cordillera Central in the Andes of Peru which reaches a height of approximately 4,800 metres (15,748 ft). It is located in the Lima Region, Yauyos Province, Huantán District. Llamayuq lies southeast of T'uruyuq and Wamp'una.
