= LANSA Flight 501 =

1966 aviation accident

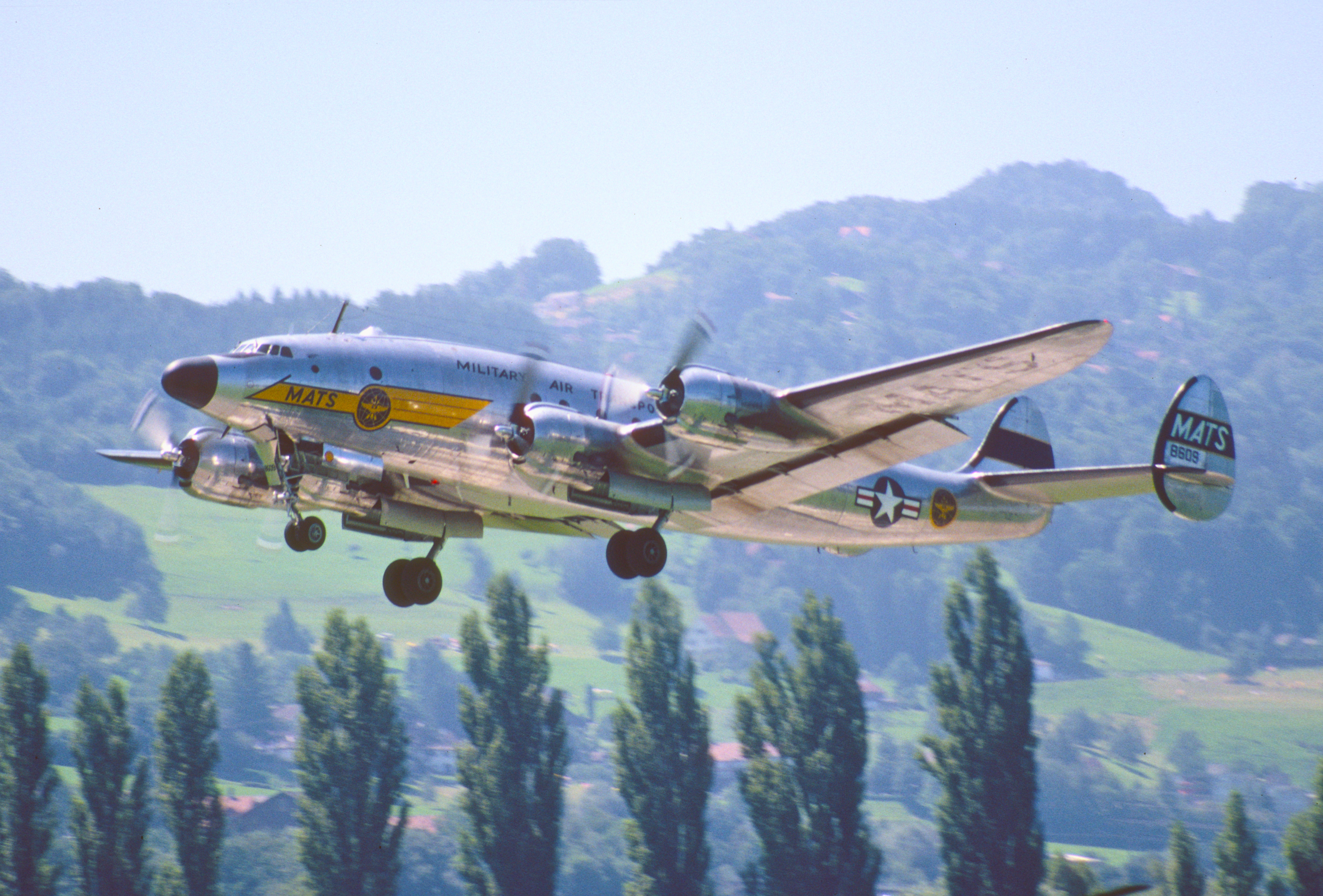
- A Lockheed Constellation similar to the accident aircraft

Accident
- Date: 27 April 1966
- Summary: Controlled flight into terrain due to pilot error
- Site: Mount Talaula, Tomas District, Peru; 12°25′S 76°10′W

Aircraft
- Aircraft type: Lockheed L-749A Constellation
- Operator: LANSA
- Registration: OB-R-771
- Flight origin: Jorge Chávez International Airport, Lima, Peru
- Destination: Alejandro Velasco Astete International Airport, Cusco, Peru
- Occupants: 49
- Passengers: 43
- Crew: 6
- Fatalities: 49
- Survivors: 0

LANSA Flight 501 was a domestic flight from Lima to Cusco operated by a Lockheed L-749 Constellation aircraft registration OB-R-771. On 27 April 1966, Flight 501 crashed into a mountain side in Tomas District, killing all 49 on board.

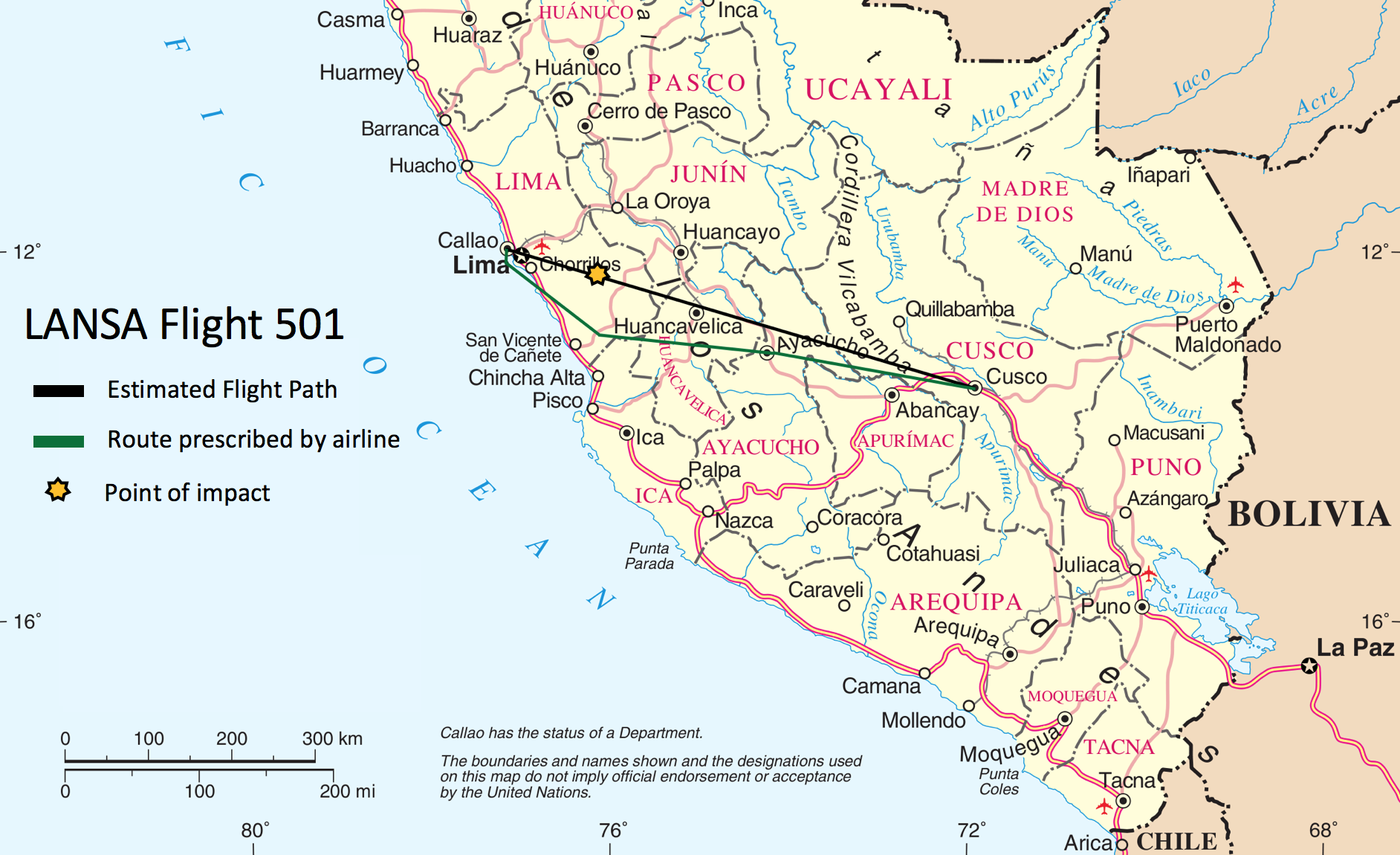
Estimated flight path and route prescribed by airline of LANSA flight 501

== Aircraft and crew ==
The aircraft was a Lockheed L-749 Constellation with initial registration N104A, built in 1947 and was delivered to Eastern Airlines that same year. It remained in service being with numerous airlines across the United States before being acquired by the Peruvian airline LANSA in April 1965, where it was re-registered to OB-R-771. The Constellation had acquired over 48,000 flight hours at the time of the accident.

The maintenance log had reported several minor deficiencies but they were promptly addressed, however records revealed that some of the parts were operated beyond their operating lifetime. Furthermore during the post-crash investigation, residues and sediments had accumulated in the domes of some propellers as a result of maintenance deficiencies.

=== Crew ===
The captain (36) was an American citizen and held an FAA pilots license with type ratings for the Curtiss C-46, Douglas B-23, L-749A and DC-3. Reports indicated he had flown the Lima-Cuzco-Lima route 112 times between January 1965 and the day of the crash.

The co-pilot (22) held a pilots license issued by the Peruvian Directorate General of Civil Aviation, and had flown a total of 963 hours between November 1965 and the day of the crash.

The flight engineer (31) held a flight mechanic's license with ratings for the L-749. He had flown a total of nearly 2,000 hours.

An extra pilot (42) was also on board for a familiarisation flight before training on L-749 aircraft.

Also on board were two stewardesses for the flight.

== Crash ==
Flight 501 departed Lima at 7:40am PET, 10 minutes later than schedule, from runway 15 and was instructed to climb at a heading of 190° until it was 9 nautical miles southwest of the airport, after which it turned towards heading 120°.

At 7:57am PET, the crew reported their position to the airport at Lima and stated "Departed Lima- Callao at 1240Z, climbing, estimating Ayacucho at 1337Z." Shortly just after 8:00am, eyewitnesses reported a low-flying plane over the village of San Pedro de Pilas, with one of them testifying they could read the "LANSA" inscription on the aircraft. Locals had determined Flight 501 was trying to fly towards the mountain range below the peaks.

It is estimated that Flight 501 struck Mount Talaula around 8:05am PET, with the wreckage being recovered the next day. All 49 occupants (which included at least 4 Americans, 2 Swiss, 1 Canadian, 3 Germans and 1 Spaniard) died in the crash and the aircraft was destroyed by fire.

== Investigation ==
Subsequent investigations were conducted to determine the cause.

- The crew were properly certified though the pilot-in-command was selected for the flight at the last minute. Since he had completed the previous day's duties late, it was assumed he had a rest period of only 6½ hours.
- The aircraft was still airworthy and the gross weight at takeoff did not exceed limits. The maintenance log had revealed that some aircraft parts were operating beyond their operating lifetime.
- The weather was reported as clear with no fog.
- Communications between Flight 501 and the control tower at Lima were normal.
- LANSA's flight plan for the Lima-Cuzco route instructed pilots to climb at a heading of 190° until it was 9 nautical miles southwest of the airport, after which it turned towards heading 120° at a straight course towards Ayacucho and then Cuzco.
- The aircraft was seen flying over the village of San Pedro de Pilas at a heading of 100° and then turning left to avoid the mountain which was higher than the aircraft.
- The wreckage was found 5 nm northeast of the village, and 29 nm north of the planned route.
- No evidence of pre-impact malfunctions were found.

It was concluded that the pilot decided to fly a straight route from Las Palmas to Cusco, and was unable to clear the summits due to insufficient climb performance.

== Probable cause ==
Investigations determined the crash to be caused by pilot error, with several assumptions made:

1. The crew violated the planned route regulations provided by the airline.
2. The climb performance was incorrectly calculated in relation to its total weight at takeoff, meaning it may not have been able to climb to the required height to clear the high mountains within 25 minutes of flight time.
3. The elevation of the peaks needed to be cleared were incorrectly calculated.
4. The captain may have overestimated the aircraft's technical abilities. His judgement may had been impaired by the lack of rest and pre-flight preparation. Good weather conditions may had influenced him to choose the direct manner of flight.
5. There was no evidence of a failure on the aircraft before the crash.

== See also ==
- LANSA Flight 502
- LANSA Flight 508
