= Tanta District =

Coordinates: 12°07′17″S 76°00′44″W

Tanta
- District
- Interactive map of Tanta
- Country: Peru
- Region: Lima
- Province: Yauyos
- Founded: February 2, 1956
- Capital: Tanta

Government
  - Mayor: Celestina Victoria Reyes Ysla

Area
  - Total: 347.15 km^{2} (134.04 sq mi)
- Elevation: 4,278 m (14,035 ft)

Population (2017)
  - Total: 479
  - Density: 1.38/km^{2} (3.57/sq mi)
- Time zone: UTC-5 (PET)
- UBIGEO: 151028

Tanta District is one of thirty-three districts of the province Yauyos in Peru. Its seat is the village Tanta.

== Geography ==
The Cordillera Central traverses the district. Some of the highest mountains of the district are listed below:

- Altarniyuq
- Anka Puyku
- Aqupallqa
- Chakraqucha
- Hatun Pawka
- Kachi Kancha
- Qulliq
- Mina Ukru
- Muki
- Paqarin Pawka
- Parya Chaka
- Paryaqaqa
- Pukyu Rumi
- Phiruruyuq
- Puma Rawkha
- Pumaqucha
- Qarwa Qhata
- Runchu
- Qutuni
- Saqsa
- Tunshu Pampa
- Ukru Ukru
- Uman
- Uqsha
- Wayna Qutuni
- Wiñaq
- Wiqu

== See also ==
- Ch'uspiqucha
- Khuchi Mach'ay
- Mulluqucha
- Pawqarqucha
- Pirqa Pirqa
- Pisququcha
- Tikllaqucha
