= Huantán District =

Coordinates: 12.4563°S 75.8116°W

Huantán Wantan
- District
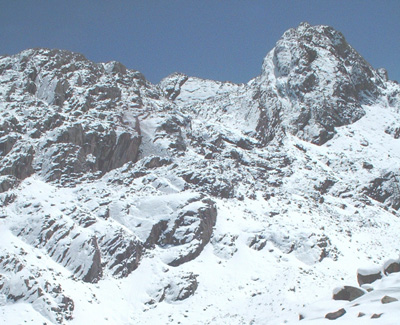
- The mountain Wamp'una; entrance to Qaqa Mach'ay at left centre
- Interactive map of Huantán
- Country: Peru
- Region: Lima
- Province: Yauyos
- Founded: January 2, 1857
- Capital: Huantán

Government
  - Mayor: Erwin Edgardo Guerrero Chulluncuy

Area
  - Total: 516.35 km^{2} (199.36 sq mi)
- Elevation: 3,290 m (10,790 ft)

Population (2005 census)
  - Total: 966
  - Density: 1.87/km^{2} (4.85/sq mi)
- Time zone: UTC-5 (PET)
- UBIGEO: 151016

Huantán District is one of thirty-three districts of the province Yauyos in Peru.

== Geography ==
The Cordillera Central traverses the district. One of the highest peaks of the district is Upyanqa at approximately 5,300 m (17,400 ft). Other mountains are listed below:

- Anta P'unqu
- Awki Sunqu
- Chaka Punta
- Chuntani
- Kaywa
- Llamayuq
- Maray
- Misitu
- Paquchi
- Puma Ranra
- P'allta Rumi
- P'ukru
- P'unqu
- P'unqu Punta
- Ruphasqa
- Sinchi Marka Punta
- Siq'i
- Suni Qaqa
- T'uru
- T'uruyuq
- Wampuru
- Wamp'una
- Wankarqucha
- Waylla
- Wayu Marka
- Yunka Warmi

== See also ==
- Qaqa Mach'ay
