= Kuntur Wachana =

Kuntur Wachana or Kuntur Wachanan (Quechua kuntur condor, wacha birth, to give birth, -na a suffix, 'where the condor is born', -n a suffix, also spelled Condor Huachana, Cóndorhuachana, Condor Wachana; Condorhuachanan, Cóndorhuachanan) may refer to:

- Kuntur Wachana (Bolivia), a mountain in Bolivia
- Kuntur Wachana (Cusco), a mountain in the Cusco Region, Peru
- Kuntur Wachana (film), a Peruvian docudrama
- Kuntur Wachanan, a mountain in the Huánuco Region, Peru
- Kuntur Wachanan (Lima), a mountain in the Lima Region, Peru
