= Hatun Pawka =

Mountain in Peru

- Location within Peru

Highest point
- Elevation: 5,420 m (17,780 ft)
- Coordinates: 12°08′47″S 75°57′10″W

Geography
- Location: Peru, Lima Region
- Parent range: Andes, Cordillera Central

Hatun Pawka (Quechua hatun big, pawka a plant (Escallonia herrerae), Hispanicized spelling Jatunpauca) is a 5,420-metre-high (17,782 ft) mountain in the Cordillera Central in the Andes of Peru. It is located in the Lima Region, Yauyos Province, on the border of the districts of Miraflores and Tanta. Hatun Pawka lies on a ridge southeast of Paqarin Pawka and northeast of a lake named Pisququcha.
