= Kuntur Wachanan (Lima) =

Mountain in Peru

- Location within Peru

Highest point
- Elevation: 4,800 m (15,700 ft)
- Coordinates: 12°05′33″S 75°47′21″W

Geography
- Location: Peru, Lima Region
- Parent range: Andes, Cordillera Central

Kuntur Wachanan (Quechua kuntur condor, wacha birth, to give birth, -na a suffix, 'where the condor is born', -n a suffix, also spelled Cóndorhuachanan) is a mountain in the Cordillera Central in the Andes of Peru which reaches a height of approximately 4,800 metres (15,748 ft). It is located in the Lima Region, Yauyos Province, Huancaya District.
