= Ñawinpukyu =

Ñawinpukyu (Quechua ñawi eye, -n a suffix, pukyu spring of water) may refer to:

== Lakes ==
- Ñawinpukyu (Junín), a lake in the Junín Region, Peru
- Ñawinpukyu (Lima), a lake in the Lima Region, Peru

== Places ==
- Ñahuimpuquio District, a district in the Huancavelica Region, Peru, and its seat Ñahuimpuquio
- a village in the Junín Region
