= Aqupallqa =

Mountain in Peru

- Location within Peru

Highest point
- Elevation: 5,445 m (17,864 ft)
- Coordinates: 12°13′27″S 75°59′28″W

Geography
- Location: Peru, Lima Region
- Parent range: Andes, Cordillera Central

Aqupallqa (Quechua aqu sand, pallqa, p'allqa, p'alqa forked, branched, fork, bifurcation, "sand bifurcation", Hispanicized spellings Acopalca, Acospalca) is a mountain in the Cordillera Central in the Andes of Peru, about 5,445 metres (17,864 ft) high. It is situated in the Lima Region, Yauyos Province, Tanta District. Aqupallqa lies north of the mountain Wayna Qutuni and the lake Tikllaqucha and northwest of the mountain Qutuni.
