= Puma Rawkha =

Mountain in Peru

- Location within Peru

Highest point
- Elevation: 4,800 m (15,700 ft)
- Coordinates: 12°02′33″S 75°56′22″W

Geography
- Location: Peru, Lima Region
- Parent range: Andes, Cordillera Central

Puma Rawkha (Quechua puma cougar, rawkha heap, "cougar heap", also spelled Pumarauca) is a mountain in the Cordillera Central in the Andes of Peru which reaches a height of approximately 4,800 metres (15,748 ft). It is located in the Lima Region, Yauyos Province, Tanta District. Puma Rawkha lies northwest of Pukyu Rumi and northeast of Mina Ukru.
