= K'isi Kancha =

Mountain in Peru

- Location within Peru

Highest point
- Elevation: 5,000 m (16,000 ft)
- Coordinates: 12°13′21″S 75°53′00″W

Geography
- Location: Peru, Lima Region
- Parent range: Andes, Cordillera Central

K'isi Kancha (Quechua k'isi a stipa variety, kancha corral, "stipa corral", Hispanicized spelling Quisicancha) is a mountain in the Cordillera Central in the Andes of Peru which reaches an altitude of approximately 5,000 m (16,000 ft). It is located in the Lima Region, Yauyos Province, Miraflores District, east of Altarniyuq.
