= Huascacocha =

Huascacocha may refer to:

- Huascacocha (Carhuacayan), a lake in Peru
- Huascacocha (Lima), a lake in Peru
