= Ayaviri =

Ayaviri may refer to the following in Peru:

- Ayaviri, Melgar, Puno region
- Ayaviri District, Melgar, Puno region
- Ayaviri, Yauyos, Lima region
- Ayaviri District, Yauyos, Lima region
- Territorial Prelature of Ayaviri
