= Anta P'unqu (Junín) =

Mountain in Peru

- Location within Peru

Highest point
- Elevation: 4,800 m (15,700 ft)
- Coordinates: 12°32′10″S 75°40′22″W

Geography
- Location: Peru, Lima Region
- Parent range: Andes, Cordillera Central

Anta P'unqu (Quechua anta copper, p'unqu pond, reservoir, tank; dam, "copper pond", also spelled Antapongo) is a mountain in the Cordillera Central in the Andes of Peru which reaches a height of approximately 4,800 metres (15,748 ft). It is located in the Lima Region, Yauyos Province, Huantán District. Anta P'unqu lies northwest of Paquchi.
