= Yuraq Ñan =

Mountain in Peru

- Location within Peru

Highest point
- Elevation: 4,600 m (15,100 ft)
- Coordinates: 12°06′13″S 75°52′32″W

Geography
- Location: Peru, Lima Region
- Parent range: Andes, Cordillera Central

Yuraq Ñan (Quechua yuraq white, ñan road, "white road", also spelled Yuracñan) is a mountain in the Cordillera Central in the Andes of Peru which reaches a height of approximately 4,600 metres (15,092 ft). It is located in the Lima Region, Yauyos Province, Huancaya District. Yuraq Ñan lies west of Sankha Ukru.
