= Uqi Uqi =

Mountain in Peru

- Location within Peru

Highest point
- Elevation: 5,000 m (16,000 ft)
- Coordinates: 12°23′32″S 75°39′21″W

Geography
- Location: Peru, Lima Region
- Parent range: Andes, Cordillera Central

Uqi Uqi (Aymara for a species of plant life, uqi brown, grey brown, Quechua uqi lead, lead-colored, the reduplication indicates that there is a group or a complex of something, "a complex of grey-brown color" or "a lot of lead", also spelled Oque Oque) is a mountain in the Cordillera Central in the Andes of Peru which reaches a height of approximately 5,000 metres (16,404 ft). It is located in the Lima Region, Yauyos Province, Laraos District. Uqi Uqi lies northeast of Wamp'una and T'uruyuq.
