= Sique =

Sique may be:

- Hispanisized spelling of Siq'i, a mountain in Peru
- obsolete spelling of Sikh

== See also ==
- Siq
