= Kiwyu =

Mountain in Peru

- Location within Peru

Highest point
- Elevation: 5,000 m (16,000 ft)
- Coordinates: 12°21′14″S 75°55′41″W

Geography
- Location: Peru, Lima Region, Yauyos Province
- Parent range: Andes, Cordillera Central

Kiwyu (Jaqaru for a kind of partridges, Hispanicized spelling Quivio) is a mountain in the Cordillera Central in the Andes of Peru which reaches an altitude of approximately 5,000 metres (16,404 ft). It is located in the Lima Region, Yauyos Province, on the border of the districts of Carani and Yauyos. Kiwyu lies southeast of Llunk'uti at a lake named Llunk'uti.
