= Lake Mullucocha =

Lake in Peru

- Location within Peru
- Location: Lima Region
- Coordinates: 12°02′S 75°58′W
- Basin countries: Peru
- Surface elevation: 4,286 metres (14,062 ft)

Lake Mullucocha (possibly from Quechua mullu small pearl made of fine clay / marine shell which is offered to the divinities, qucha lake, lagoon) is a lake in Peru located in the Lima Region, Yauyos Province, Tanta District. Mullucocha, situated at a height of about 4,286 metres (14,062 ft), lies southeast of the Pariacaca mountain range, east of P'itiqucha and northeast of Paucarcocha.

Lake Mullucocha is situated next to an ancient road part of the Inca road system.

== See also ==
- List of lakes in Peru
- Nor Yauyos-Cochas Landscape Reserve
- Pirqa Pirqa
