= David Chaparro Pareja =

Peruvian politician (1875–1963)

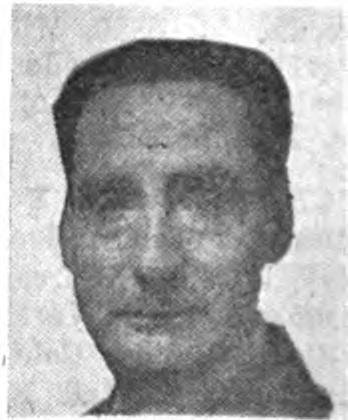

Provincial Mayor of Cuzco
- In office 1938–1942
- In office 1911–1912

Personal details
- Born: March 29, 1875; Cuzco, Peru
- Died: July 27, 1963 (aged 88); Lima, Peru
- Awards: Order of Merit

David Segundo Chaparro Pareja (Cuzco; March 29, 1875 — Lima; July 27, 1963) was a Peruvian teacher, politician and jurist. He held a parliamentary position in the Peruvian congress for Cuzco Province.

== Early life ==
Chaparro was born on March 29, 1875, in Cuzco. He was the son of José Valentín Chaparro and María Carmen Pareja. His sister Lucía was the mother of Jorge Chávez Chaparro, rector of the University of Cuzco from 1961 to 1966. He studied at Saint Anthony the Abbot Seminary and in the National College of Sciences. His higher education studies were at the University of Cuczo and the University of Arequipa, graduating from the latter in 1904. He participated in the unsuccessful coup d'état in 1908, fighting in the battle of Calca. After another coup in 1909 that led to the declaration of a national amnesty, he left his refuge in the valley of Lares.

== Career ==
=== Professional career ===
In 1910 he was appointed associate professor at the National University of Saint Anthony the Abbot in Cuzco, in 1911 he was appointed accidental professor of the Philosophy of Law and Civil Law courses; and in 1913 he was elevated to senior professor.

He held various judicial positions, in addition to being a member of the Superior Court of Justice of Cuzco in 1932. He was deputy director of the National College of Sciences, while in 1938 he was elected rector of the San Antonio Abad National University for a period 5 years; As soon as two years had passed since this election, by virtue of the New Organic Law of Education that was promulgated in 1941, he proceeded to a new election, being re-elected. In this role, he instituted for the first time the Social Assistance service so that students would have hospital medical services and medications in case of illness.

Together with Luis Pardo and Manuel Briceño, he is part of the former Archeology Board that in 1946, under technical advice, directed the intervention of the platforms on the east side of the Intihuatana sector because they were in a very poor state of conservation. In 1943 he received the Order of Merit of Chile, in the rank of commander. In 1960, he was appointed professor emeritus.

=== Political career ===
He served as a substitute deputy for the province of Calca between 1907 and 1912 during the governments of José Pardo y Barreda and the first presidency of Augusto B. Leguía, and in 1913 as a deputy for the province of Cuzco; In this context, he was part of various Constitution, Legislation and other commissions. Additionally, he served as mayor of Cuzco for the periods of 1911-1912 and 1938–1942.

== See also ==
- Jorge Chávez Chaparro

Preceded by ?	Rector of the University of Cuzco; 1939–1946	Succeeded by Alfredo Yépez Miranda
Preceded by Roberto Garmendia Castañeda	Provincial Mayor of Cuzco; 1938–1942	Succeeded by ?
Preceded by ?	Provincial Mayor of Cuzco; 1911–1912	Succeeded by ?
Preceded by -	Deputy for Cuzco; July 28, 1913–December 9, 1918	Succeeded by -
Preceded by -	Substitute Deputy for Calca; July 28, 1907–December 23, 1912	Succeeded by -
