= Wiñaq (Peru) =

Mountain in Peru

- Location within Peru

Highest point
- Elevation: 4,800 m (15,700 ft)
- Coordinates: 12°05′07″S 76°01′45″W

Geography
- Location: Peru, Lima Region
- Parent range: Andes, Cordillera Central

Wiñaq (Quechua for "growing", "the one that grows" or a kind of tree (Tabebuia nodosa), also spelled Huiñac) is a mountain in the Cordillera Central in the Andes of Peru which reaches a height of approximately 4,800 metres (15,748 ft). It is located in the Lima Region, Yauyos Province, Tanta District. Wiñaq lies west of a lake named Pawqarqucha and south of P'itiqucha.
