= Líneas Aéreas Nacionales =

Líneas Aéreas Nacionales, or National Airlines (abbreviated LAN or LANSA), may refer to:

- LATAM Ecuador formerly Líneas Aéreas Nacionales del Ecuador
- LATAM Chile formerly Lan Chile
- Líneas Aéreas Nacionales S.A., Peru
- LATAM Perú formerly LAN Perú S.A.
