= Omas =

Omas may refer to:

- Omaswati, Indonesian comedian
- Places in Peru:
  - Omas District
  - Omas City
