= Runchu =

Mountain in Peru

- Location within Peru

Highest point
- Elevation: 5,165 m (16,946 ft)
- Coordinates: 12°11′53″S 76°03′19″W

Geography
- Location: Peru, Lima Region
- Parent range: Andes, Cordillera Central

Runchu (Quechua for shrew opossum, also spelled Runcho) is a 5,165-metre-high (16,946 ft) mountain in the Cordillera Central in the Andes of Peru. It is located in the Lima Region, Yauyos Province, on the border of the districts of San Joaquín and Tanta. Runchu lies northwest of Tikllaqucha. It is situated on the western border of the Nor Yauyos-Cochas Landscape Reserve.
