= Kachi Raqra =

Mountain in Peru

- Location within Peru

Highest point
- Elevation: 4,600 m (15,100 ft)
- Coordinates: 12°03′54″S 75°50′34″W

Geography
- Location: Peru, Lima Region
- Parent range: Andes, Cordillera Central

Kachi Raqra (Quechua kachi salt, raqra fissure, crack, crevice, "salt crack (or crevice)", also spelled Cachiracra) is a mountain in the Cordillera Central in the Andes of Peru which reaches a height of approximately 4,600 metres (15,092 ft). It is located in the Lima Region, Yauyos Province, Huancaya District.
