= Putinza District =

Coordinates: 12°40′08″S 75°56′58″W

Putinza
- District
- Interactive map of Putinza
- Country: Peru
- Region: Lima
- Province: Yauyos
- Founded: October 6, 1964
- Capital: San Lorenzo de Putinza

Government
  - Mayor: Adelmo Ferrand Quispe Rojas

Area
  - Total: 66.44 km^{2} (25.65 sq mi)
- Elevation: 1,977 m (6,486 ft)

Population (2005 census)
  - Total: 481
  - Density: 7.24/km^{2} (18.8/sq mi)
- Time zone: UTC-5 (PET)
- UBIGEO: 151023

Putinza District is one of thirty-three districts of Yauyos Province, Lima Department, Peru. Its capital is San Lorenzo de Putinza and it is the prime apple producer in the Province. Common surnames in this district are: Sandoval, Samaniego, Alcala, Jesusi and Huapaya.
