= Rinriyuq =

Mountain in Peru

- Location within Peru

Highest point
- Elevation: 4,600 m (15,100 ft)
- Coordinates: 12°12′02″S 75°49′25″W

Geography
- Location: Peru, Lima Region
- Parent range: Andes, Cordillera Central

Rinriyuq (Quechua rinri ear, -yuq a suffix, "the one with an ear (or ears)", also spelled Rinrioc) is mountain in the Cordillera Central in the Andes of Peru which reaches a height of approximately 4,600 metres (15,092 ft). It is located in the Lima Region, Yauyos Province, on the border of the districts of Huancaya and Vitis, west of Huancaya.
