= Hongos District =

Coordinates: 12.8105°S 75.7652°W

Hongos
- District
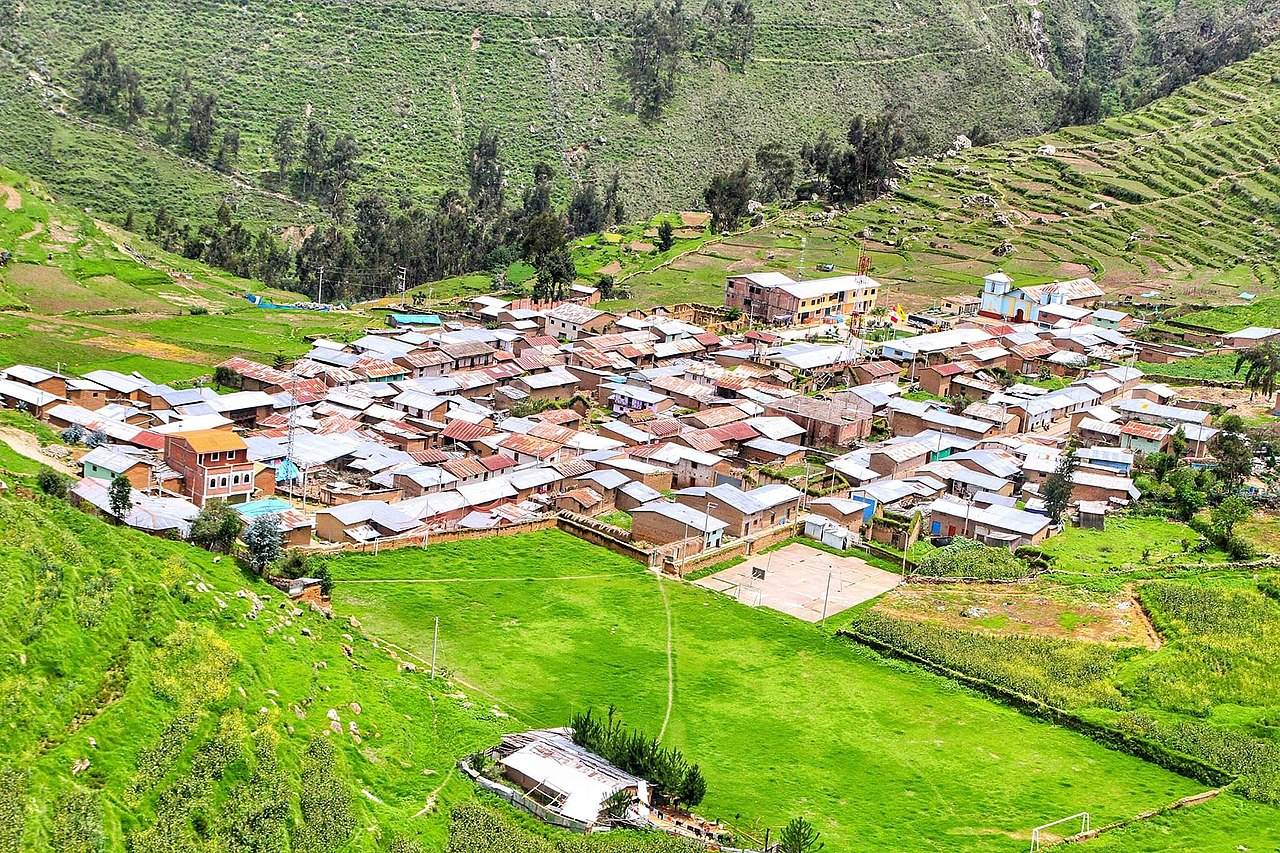
- A panoramic image view of Hongos
- Interactive map of Hongos
- Country: Peru
- Region: Lima
- Province: Yauyos
- Founded: January 29, 1965
- Capital: Hongos

Government
  - Mayor: Albino Huaman Poma

Area
  - Total: 103.8 km^{2} (40.1 sq mi)
- Elevation: 3,205 m (10,515 ft)

Population (2005 census)
  - Total: 455
  - Density: 4.38/km^{2} (11.4/sq mi)
- Time zone: UTC-5 (PET)
- UBIGEO: 151012

Hongos District is one of thirty-three districts of the province Yauyos in Peru.
