= Wachwa Runtuna =

Mountain in Peru

- Location within Peru

Highest point
- Elevation: 5,000 m (16,000 ft)
- Coordinates: 12°16′19″S 75°44′34″W

Geography
- Location: Peru, Lima Region
- Parent range: Andes, Cordillera Central

Wachwa Runtuna (Quechua wachwa Andean goose, runtu egg, -na a suffix, "where the Andean goose lays eggs", also spelled Huachhua Runtuna) is a mountain in the Cordillera Central in the Andes of Peru which reaches a height of approximately 5,000 metres (16,404 ft). It is located in the Lima Region, Yauyos Province, on the border of the districts of Alis and Tomas, south of Tomas.
