= Yauyos province =

Province of Peru

Coordinates: 12.4641°S 75.9233°W

Yauyos
- Province
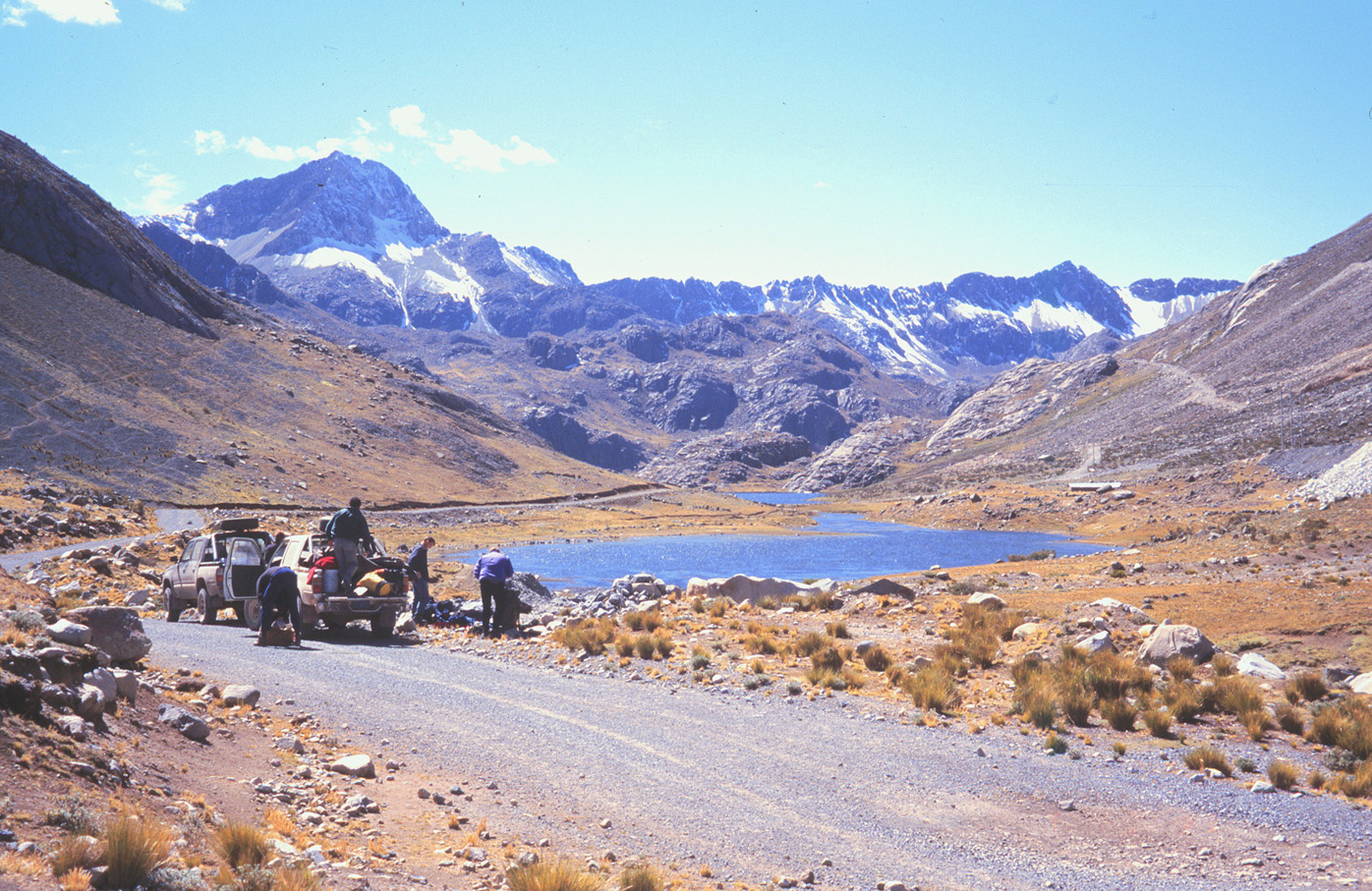
- Lake Pumaqucha

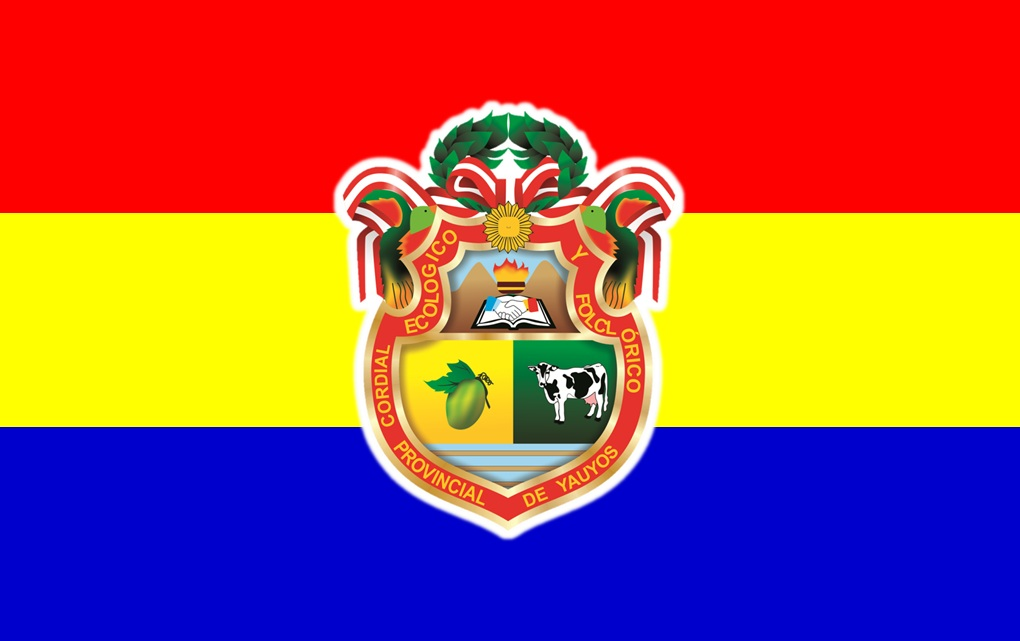
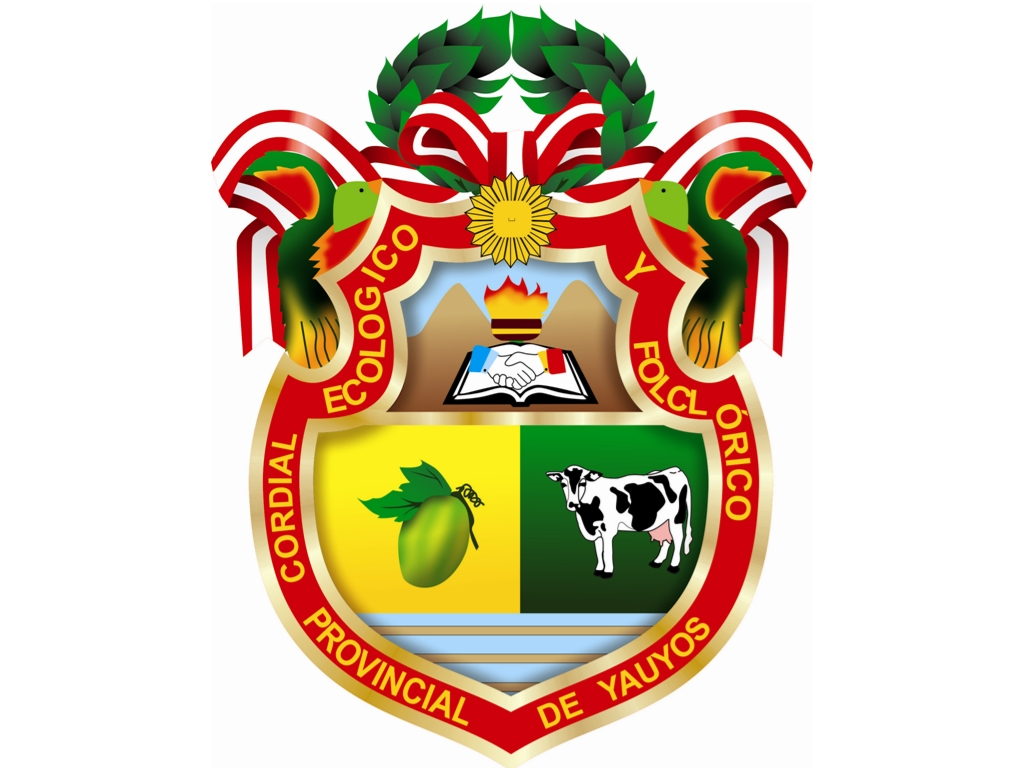
- Flag Coat of arms

- Location of Yauyos in Lima
- Country: Peru
- Department: Lima
- Capital: Yauyos

Government
  - Mayor: Elva Filomena Dionisio Inga (2019-2022)

Area
  - Total: 6,901.58 km^{2} (2,664.71 sq mi)
- Elevation: 2,874 m (9,429 ft)

Population
  - Total: 20,463
  - Density: 2.9650/km^{2} (7.6792/sq mi)
- UBIGEO: 1510
- Website: www.muniyauyos.gob.pe

Yauyos is a province of the department of Lima, Peru. From the administrative point of view of the Catholic Church in Peru, it forms part of the Territorial Prelature of Yauyos. Its capital is Yauyos.

== Boundaries ==
- North: province of Huarochirí
- East: Junín Region, Huancavelica Region
- South: Ica Region
- West: province of Cañete

== Geography ==
The Nor Yauyos-Cochas Landscape Reserve lies in the province of Yauyos. Aqupallqa, Llunk'uti, Qutuni, Runchu, T'uru and Wankarqucha of the Cordillera Central of Peru belong to the highest mountains of the province. They all reach altitudes above 5,000 m (16,000 ft). Other mountains of the province include:

- Altarniyuq
- Anka Puyku
- Anta P'unqu
- Aqu P'unqu
- Aqu Puyku Punta
- Aqupallqa
- Awki Sunqu
- Chaka Punta
- Chakraqucha
- Chili Punta
- Chuntani
- Hatun Pawka
- Hatun Punta
- Kachi Kancha
- Kachi Raqra
- Kancha Q'asa
- Kaywa
- Kima Rumi
- Kiwyu
- Kulliq
- Kunkayuq
- Kuntur Punta
- Kuntur Waqta
- K'isi Kancha
- Llamayuq
- Marayniyuq
- Mina Ukru
- Misitu
- Mit'u
- Muchka
- Muki (Huancaya-Tomas)
- Muki (Tanta)
- Palta Rumi
- Paqarin Pawka
- Paquchi
- Parya Chaka
- Paryaqaqa
- Pinkuyllu
- Puka Puka
- Pukap Siqin
- Pukyu Rumi
- Puma Ranra
- Puma Rawkha
- Pumaqucha
- Phiruruyuq
- P'allqa
- Qarwa Qhata
- Qullqiyuq Punta
- Qutuni
- Quyllur
- Q'umir Pampa
- Rinriyuq
- Runchu
- Ruphasqa
- Sankha Ukru
- Sapallan Warmi
- Saqsa
- Sinchi Marka Punta
- Siq'i
- Tunshu Pampa
- T'uruyuq
- Uchku
- Ukru Ukru
- Uman
- Upyanqa
- Uqi Uqi
- Uqish Punta
- Uqsha
- Wachwa Runtu
- Wachwa Runtuna
- Wamalla
- Wamanripa
- Wampuru
- Wamp'una
- Waylla
- Waylla Waqran
- Wayna Qutuni
- Wayu Marka
- Wila Wila
- Winsu
- Wiñaq
- Wiqu
- Yana Punta
- Yana P'unqu
- Yana Uqsha
- Yana Urqu
- Yunka Warmi
- Yuraq Ñan

Some of the largest lakes of the province are listed below:

- Challwaqucha
- Ch'uspiqucha
- Mulluqucha
- Ñawinpukyu
- Papaqucha
- Pawqarqucha
- Pikiqucha
- Pisququcha
- Pumaqucha
- Qiwllaqucha
- Quchapampa
- Tikllaqucha
- Wask'aqucha

== History ==
During the 2007 Peru earthquake, Yauyos suffered major damage.

== Political division ==
The capital of this province is the city of Yauyos. The province extends over an area of 6,901.58 square kilometers (2,664.71 sq mi) and is divided into 33 districts:

- Yauyos
- Alis
- Ayauca
- Ayaviri
- Azángaro
- Cacra
- Carania
- Catahuasi
- Chocos
- Cochas
- Colonia
- Hongos
- Huampara
- Huancaya
- Huangascar
- Huantán
- Huañec
- Laraos
- Lincha
- Madean
- Miraflores
- Omas
- Putinza
- Quinches
- Quinocay
- San Joaquín
- San Pedro de Pilas
- Tanta
- Tauripampa
- Tomas
- Tupe
- Viñac
- Vitis

== Demographics ==
The province has a population of 28,000 inhabitants as of 2002. One distinctive cultural trait of the province is that the Tupe district is home to the small ethnic minority who speak the indigenous Jaqaru/Kawki language, a linguistic curiosity as the only surviving relative of Aymara, spoken far to the south in the Altiplano. Besides that, several archaic Quechua dialects are spoken in some districts (Huacarpana, Apurí, Madean, Viñac, Azángaro, Huangáscar, Chocos, Cacra, Hongos, Tanta, Lincha, Tomás, Alis, Huancaya, Vitis, and Laraos). However, all these dialects and languages, respectively, are in danger of extinction.

== See also ==
- Jaqaru language
- Khuchi Mach'ay
- Pirqa Pirqa
- Qaqa Mach'ay
- Sima Pumaqucha
- Wamanmarka
