= Quinocay District =

Coordinates: 12.3625°S 76.2266°W

Quinocay
- District
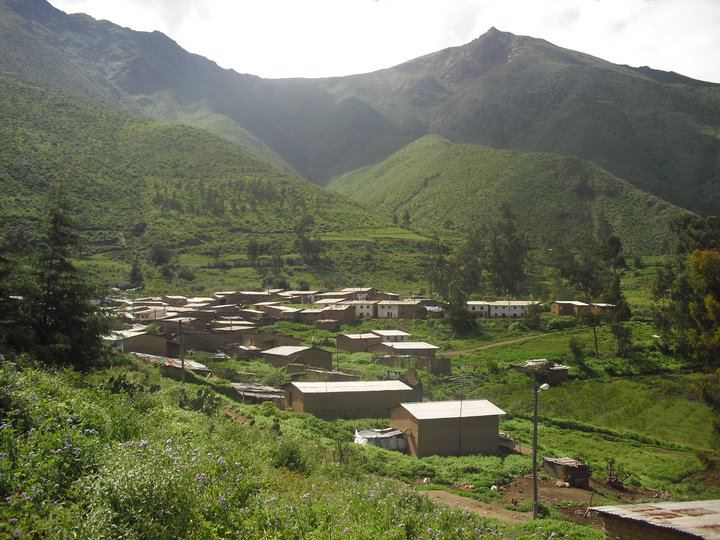
- Quinocay
- Interactive map of Quinocay
- Country: Peru
- Region: Lima
- Province: Yauyos
- Founded: March 25, 1960
- Capital: Quinocay

Government
  - Mayor: Clemente Angel Manta Martinez

Area
  - Total: 153.13 km^{2} (59.12 sq mi)
- Elevation: 2,652 m (8,701 ft)

Population (2005 census)
  - Total: 542
  - Density: 3.54/km^{2} (9.17/sq mi)
- Time zone: UTC-5 (PET)
- UBIGEO: 151025

Quinocay District is one of thirty-three districts of the province Yauyos in Peru.
