= Wamanripa (Yauyos) =

Mountain in Peru

- Location within Peru

Highest point
- Elevation: 4,600 m (15,100 ft)
- Coordinates: 12°10′55″S 75°49′00″W

Geography
- Location: Peru, Lima Region
- Parent range: Andes, Cordillera Central

Wamanripa (local name for Senecio or a species of it, also applied for Laccopetalum giganteum, also spelled Huamanripa) is mountain in the Cordillera Central in the Andes of Peru which reaches a height of approximately 4,600 metres (15,092 ft). It is located in the Lima Region, Yauyos Province, Huancaya District.
