= Chocos District =

Chocos
- District
- Interactive map of Chocos
- Coordinates: 13°19′S 75°47′W
- Country: Peru
- Region: Lima
- Province: Yauyos
- Founded: April 7, 1954
- Capital: Chocos

Government
  - Mayor: Estiguar Mariño Gutierrez Postillon

Area
  - Total: 213.37 km^{2} (82.38 sq mi)
- Elevation: 2,749 m (9,019 ft)

Population (2005 census)
  - Total: 1,149
  - Density: 5.385/km^{2} (13.95/sq mi)
- Time zone: UTC-5 (PET)
- UBIGEO: 151009

Chocos District is one of thirty-three districts of the province Yauyos in Peru.
