= Huañec District =

Coordinates: 12.2944°S 76.1388°W

Huañec
- District
- Interactive map of Huañec
- Country: Peru
- Region: Lima
- Province: Yauyos
- Capital: Huañec

Government
  - Mayor: Wiston Manolo Reyes Ramos

Area
  - Total: 37.54 km^{2} (14.49 sq mi)
- Elevation: 3,202 m (10,505 ft)

Population (2005 census)
  - Total: 415
  - Density: 11.1/km^{2} (28.6/sq mi)
- Time zone: UTC-5 (PET)
- UBIGEO: 151017

Huañec District is one of thirty-three districts of the province Yauyos in Peru.
