= Kima Rumi (Lima-Junín) =

Mountain in Peru

- Location within Peru

Highest point
- Elevation: 4,600 m (15,100 ft)
- Coordinates: 12°01′23″S 75°49′35″W

Geography
- Location: Peru, Lima Region, Junín Region
- Parent range: Andes, Cordillera Central

Kima Rumi (Ancash Quechua kima three (kimsa), Quechua rumi stone, "three stones", also spelled Quimarumi) is a mountain in the Cordillera Central in the Andes of Peru which reaches a height of approximately 4,600 metres (15,092 ft). It is located in the Junín Region, Jauja Province, Canchayllo District, and in the Lima Region, Yauyos Province, Huancaya District.
