= Alis District =

Alis
- District
- Interactive map of Alis
- Coordinates: 12.2810°S 75.7864°W
- Country: Peru
- Region: Lima
- Province: Yauyos
- Founded: February 23, 1920
- Capital: Alis

Government
  - Mayor: Gusman Domingo Obispo Taipe

Area
  - Total: 142.06 km^{2} (54.85 sq mi)
- Elevation: 3,233 m (10,607 ft)

Population (2005 census)
  - Total: 380
  - Density: 2.7/km^{2} (6.9/sq mi)
- Time zone: UTC-5 (PET)
- UBIGEO: 151002

Alis District is one of thirty-three districts of the province Yauyos in Peru.

== See also ==
- Muchka
- Puka Puka
- Sapallan Warmi
- Wachwa Runtuna
