= Puka Puka (Lima) =

Mountain in Peru

- Location within Peru

Highest point
- Elevation: 4,800 m (15,700 ft)
- Coordinates: 12°15′09″S 75°47′11″W

Geography
- Location: Peru, Lima Region
- Parent range: Andes, Cordillera Central

Puka Puka (Quechua puka red, the reduplication indicates that there is a complex of something, "a complex of red color", also spelled Pucapuca) is mountain in the Cordillera Central in the Andes of Peru which reaches a height of approximately 4,800 metres (15,748 ft). It is located in the Lima Region, Yauyos Province, on the border of the districts of Alis and Vitis, north of Alis.
