= Quinches District =

Coordinates: 12°18′27″S 76°08′32″W

Quinches
- District
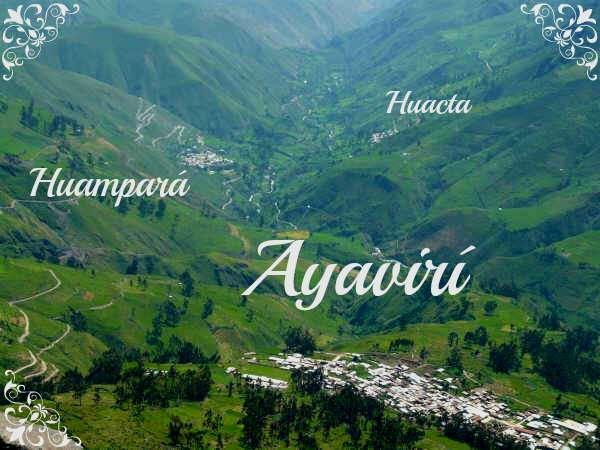
- The Ayaviri valley in the districts Ayaviri and Quinches
- Interactive map of Quinches
- Country: Peru
- Region: Lima
- Province: Yauyos
- Founded: January 2, 1857
- Capital: Quinches

Government
  - Mayor: Rafael Arcangel Ramos Martinez

Area
  - Total: 113.33 km^{2} (43.76 sq mi)
- Elevation: 2,962 m (9,718 ft)

Population (2005 census)
  - Total: 1,026
  - Density: 9.053/km^{2} (23.45/sq mi)
- Time zone: UTC-5 (PET)
- UBIGEO: 151024

Quinches District is one of thirty-three districts of the province Yauyos in Peru.

== See also ==
- Wayna Qutuni
