= Ayaviri District, Yauyos =

Coordinates: 12.3825°S 76.1373°W

Ayaviri Ayawiri
- District
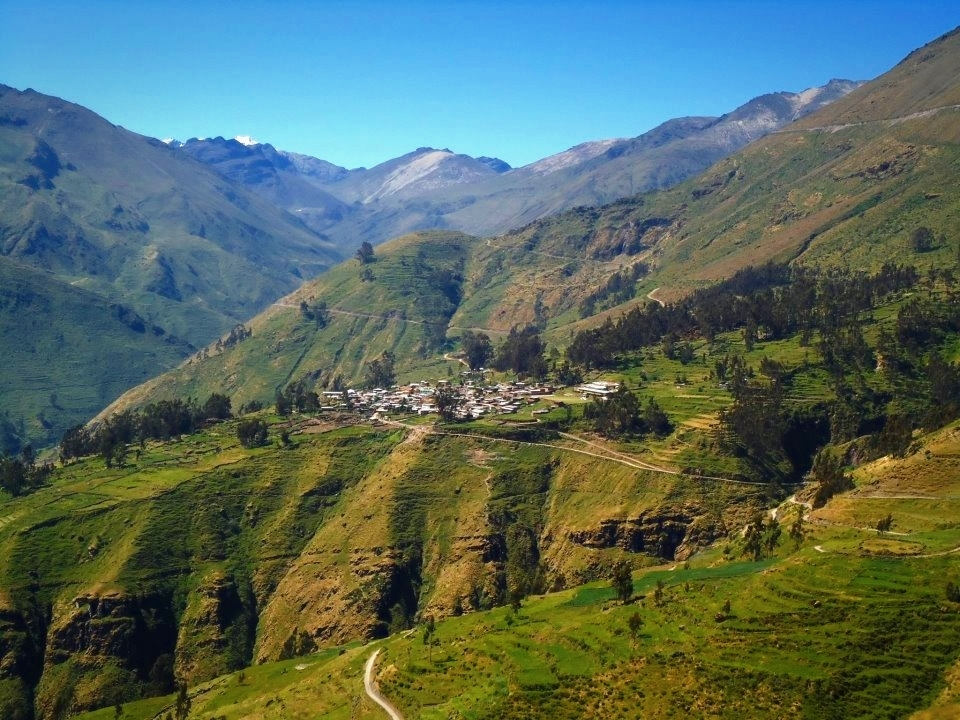
- Lateral view of Ayaviri
- Interactive map of Ayaviri
- Country: Peru
- Region: Lima
- Province: Yauyos
- Founded: August 4, 1821
- Capital: Ayaviri

Government
  - Mayor: Elizabeth Helma Lorenzo Felix

Area
  - Total: 238.83 km^{2} (92.21 sq mi)
- Elevation: 3,235 m (10,614 ft)

Population (2017 census)
  - Total: 565
  - Density: 2.37/km^{2} (6.13/sq mi)
- Time zone: UTC-5 (PET)
- UBIGEO: 151004

Ayaviri or Ayawiri (Aymara) is one of thirty-three districts of the province Yauyos in Peru.

== See also ==
- Llunk'uti
- Qutuni
- Wask'aqucha
- Wayna Qutuni
