= Qullqiyuq Punta =

Mountain in Peru

- Location within Peru

Highest point
- Elevation: 4,600 m (15,100 ft)
- Coordinates: 12°07′39″S 75°41′52″W

Geography
- Location: Peru, Lima Region
- Parent range: Andes, Cordillera Central

Qullqiyuq Punta (Quechua qullqi silver, -yuq a suffix, punta peak; ridge, "the peak (or ridge) with silver", also spelled Collquiyoc Punta) is a mountain in the Cordillera Central in the Andes of Peru which reaches a height of approximately 4,600 metres (15,092 ft). It is located in the Lima Region, Yauyos Province, Tomas District.
