= Ayauca District =

Coordinates: 12°35′32″S 76°02′12″W

Ayauca
- District
- Interactive map of Ayauca
- Country: Peru
- Region: Lima
- Province: Yauyos
- Founded: August 16, 1920
- Capital: Ayauca

Government
  - Mayor: Freddy Moises Soriano Leandro

Area
  - Total: 438.79 km^{2} (169.42 sq mi)
- Elevation: 3,125 m (10,253 ft)

Population (2017)
  - Total: 1,145
  - Density: 2.609/km^{2} (6.758/sq mi)
- Time zone: UTC-5 (PET)
- UBIGEO: 151003

Ayauca District is one of thirty-three districts of the province Yauyos in Peru.
