= Vitis District =

Coordinates: 12.2239°S 75.8079°W

Vitis
- District
- Interactive map of Vitis
- Country: Peru
- Region: Lima
- Province: Yauyos
- Founded: February 7, 1944
- Capital: Vitis
- Subdivisions: Chunararran

Government
  - Mayor: Edgardo Max Reinoso Fernandez

Area
  - Total: 101.79 km^{2} (39.30 sq mi)
- Elevation: 3,616 m (11,864 ft)

Population (2005 census)
  - Total: 515
  - Density: 5.06/km^{2} (13.1/sq mi)
- Time zone: UTC-5 (PET)
- UBIGEO: 151033

Vitis District is one of thirty-three districts of the Yauyos Province in Peru.

Vitis has a small annex 42 kilometers from the center of town, named Chunuraran, which is inaccessible by road and is used by the townsfolk for their cows, llamas, and alpacas. Few people really live in Chunuraran throughout the entire calendar year. From Chunuraran as well as the path to the annex views of a small mini-chain of snow-covered mountains can be seen. As is the case with the rest of the Sierra mountains in Peru, much of the snow of these mountains has receded a significant amount in the past decades, and the last of the permanent snow-covered mountains in the Yauyos Province will have disappeared completely within the next few decades.

== Origins ==
The origins of the people of the town of Vitis lie in its archaeological sites, Quchawasi (Cochashuasi, Cochaswasi) and Huallugina (or Huayllugina). With claims to existence before the times of the Incan Empire, Quchawasi and Huallugina (or Huayllugina) are about an hour's walk from the town of Vitis and are composed of fallen houses as well as the remains of an old irrigation system.

From Quchawasi (Quechua qucha lake, wasi house, "lake house") one has a view of two rivers, the Cañete River and Puente River, as well as of the lake Pikiqucha down below. The people of Vitis call Quchawasi "Mini Machu Picchu" because it is on top of a flat part of the mountain and two rivers can be seen from it, as is the case with Machu Picchu. Higher up the mountain is Huallugina (or Huayllugina). From both sites views of dozens of mountain tops, sometimes snow-covered, can be seen.

== See also ==
- Muchka
- Puka Puka
- Rinriyuq
- Waylla Waqran
- Winsu
