= Papaqucha (Lima) =

Lake in Peru

- Location within Peru
- Location: Peru; Lima Region
- Coordinates: 12°06′30″S 75°50′03″W

Papaqucha (Quechua papa potato, qucha lake, "potato lake", hispanicized spelling Papacocha) is a lake in Peru located in the Lima Region, Yauyos Province, Huancaya District. It lies at the Cañete River, near the town of Vilca.
