= LANSA Flight 502 =

1970 aviation accident in Peru

- OB-R-939, the aircraft involved, pictured shortly before the accident

Accident
- Date: August 9, 1970
- Summary: Pilot error due to mishandled engine failure caused by inadequate maintenance
- Site: San Jerónimo, near Quispiquilla Airport, Cusco, Peru; 13°32′16.36″S 71°57′57.73″W (approx.)
- Total fatalities: 101
- Total injuries: 1

Aircraft
- Aircraft type: Lockheed L-188A Electra
- Aircraft name: Tupac Amaru
- Operator: Líneas Aéreas Nacionales S. A. (Peru)
- Registration: OB-R-939
- Flight origin: Quispiquilla Airport, Cusco, Peru
- Destination: Jorge Chávez International Airport, Lima, Peru
- Occupants: 100
- Passengers: 92
- Crew: 8
- Fatalities: 99
- Injuries: 1
- Survivors: 1

Ground casualties
- Ground fatalities: 2

LANSA Flight 502 was a Lockheed L-188A Electra operated by Líneas Aéreas Nacionales Sociedad Anónima (LANSA) which crashed shortly after takeoff from Quispiquilla Airport near Cusco, Peru, on August 9, 1970, after losing all power from one of its four engines. The turboprop airliner, registered OB-R-939, was bound from Cusco to Lima, carrying 8 crew and 92 passengers. All but one of the occupants died from injuries sustained from impact forces and post-crash fire. Two people on the ground were also killed. There were 49 American high school exchange students on board, all of whom perished. A Peruvian government investigation concluded that the accident was caused by improper execution of engine-out procedures by the flight crew and lack of proper maintenance. LANSA was fined and its operations were suspended for 90 days. At the time, the crash was the deadliest ever in Peruvian history before being surpassed by Faucett Perú Flight 251 in 1996.

== Background ==
More than half of the passengers belonged to a single group, sponsored by the Buffalo, New York, based International Fellowship student exchange program, consisting of 49 American high school exchange students, along with their teachers, family members, and guides, who were returning after a visit to the nearby Machu Picchu to their host families in the Lima area. The daughter of the mayor of Lima was also accompanying the group. The Peruvian passengers included a couple on their honeymoon.

August 9, 1970, was a Sunday, and Flight 502 was originally scheduled to depart Cuzco at 8:30 am, (Note: Note that LANSA 1968 flight timetable shows 10:15 am as 'daily' departure time of Flight 502 from Cuzco to Lima, although NYT article reports it was scheduled as 08:30 am for flight 502.) but since many of the members of the American group wanted to visit the nearby Pisac native handicraft market prior to leaving for Lima, the airline postponed the departure time to 2:45 pm.

Quispiquilla Airport, since renamed to Alejandro Velasco Astete International Airport, is located about 5 km (3 mi) east-southeast of the city of Cusco, in a small valley high on the Andes, at an elevation of 3,310 metres (10,860 ft) above mean sea level. Higher mountainous terrain surrounds the single east-west runway airport in all directions. Since it was August, it was winter time in Peru, as in the rest of the Southern Hemisphere.

== Crash ==
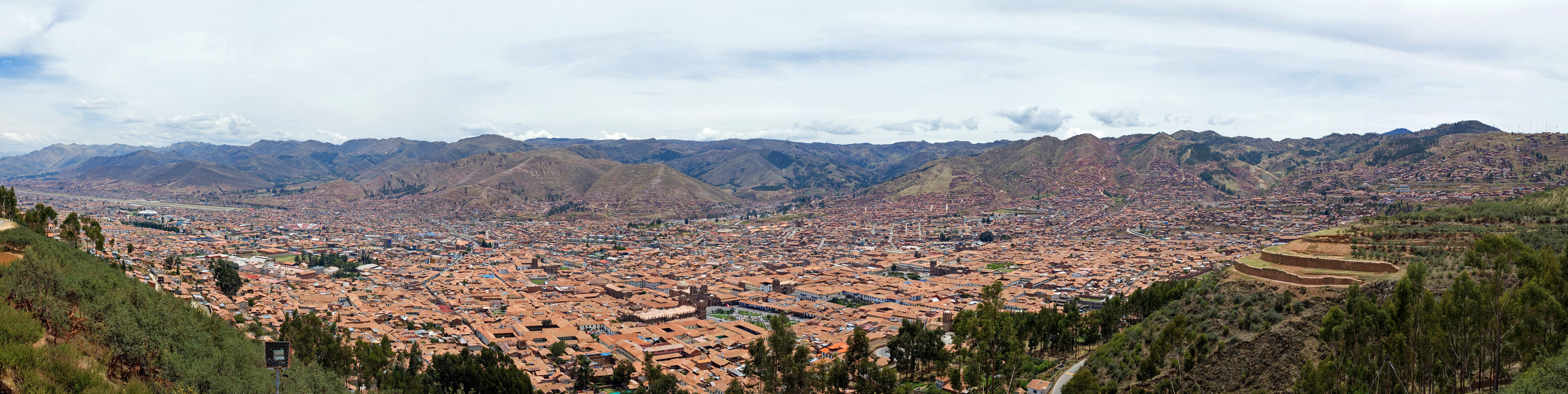
LANSA Flight 502's entire flight path, from takeoff to crash, is encompassed within this panoramic view of Cusco. The runway is seen to the left (east), and rising terrain is seen along the extended takeoff path to the right (west).

At about 2:55 pm, the four-engine Electra turboprop began its takeoff run to the west. At some point during the takeoff run or initial climb, the number three engine (Note: Number three engine is inboard, right side.) failed and caught fire. The crew continued the takeoff and climb, per standard procedure, using power from the remaining three engines. The pilot radioed the control tower declaring an emergency, and the control tower cleared the flight for an immediate landing. The number three engine was engulfed in flames as the crew incorrectly retracted the flaps and maneuvered the plane into a left turn back to the runway. The plane entered a 30° to 45° bank, then rapidly lost altitude and crashed into hilly terrain about 2.4 kilometres (1.5 mi) west-southwest of the runway, above the village of San Jerónimo. The fuel on board caught fire and all aboard perished except the copilot, 26-year-old Juan Loo, who was found in the wreckage of the cockpit badly burned but alive. Two farm workers were killed on the ground.

== Investigation and aftermath ==
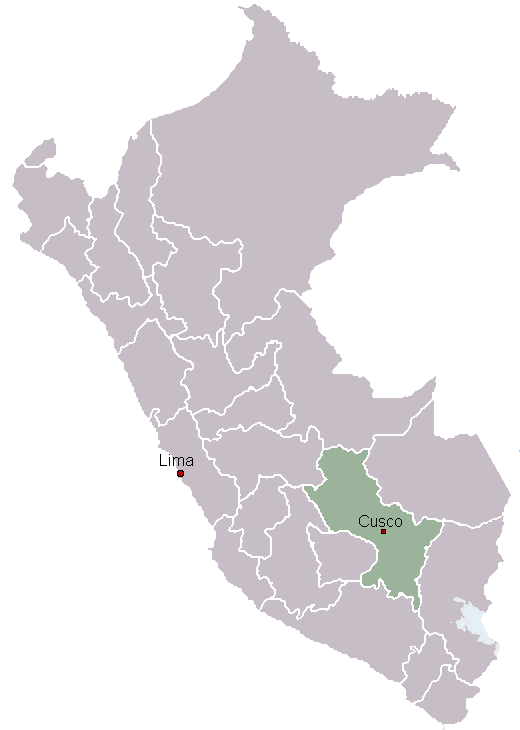
Map of Peru depicting Flight 502 origin and intended destination

The crash was investigated by the Peruvian government, which published a Final Report on 3 September 1970. The report concluded that the accident was caused by failure of the number 3 engine immediately after takeoff, followed by failure of the flight crew to properly execute the appropriate engine-out procedures, which led to the crash. There was also evidence of failure by LANSA to perform proper maintenance on the aircraft, which could have prevented the engine failure. (Note: From Final Report (in Spanish): "...Acción operativa indebida al retractar el flap de ala después del decollaje, procedimiento en que había sido instruido el piloto, lo que impidió que el avión en la configuración en que se encontraba: tres motores operativos, peso bruto cerca al máximo autorizado y temperatura ambiente alta, adoptara un régimen de ascenso suficiente en relación con la gradiente del suelo, para alcanzar una altura sobre el terreno que permitiera la maniobra con seguridad para regresar de inmediato al Aeropuerto... [English: ...Improper operational action by retracting the wing flap after taking off, a procedure in which the pilot had been instructed, which prevented the aircraft in the configuration it was in: three operational engines, gross weight close to the maximum authorized and high ambient temperature, adopt a rate of climb sufficient in relation to the gradient of the ground, to reach a height above the ground that would allow the maneuver safely to return immediately to the airport...]" Key points: improper retraction of flaps and failure to maintain terrain clearance.)

The Peruvian government subsequently fined LANSA and some of its employees, and suspended the airline's operating license for 90 days as a consequence.

Approximately a year after the suspension ended, the airline lost its last working aircraft with the crash of LANSA Flight 508, and ceased operations. Since LANSA began operations in 1963 until its demise in 1972, three of its flights ended in a fatal crash: LANSA 501, 502 and 508, with a total of 241 fatalities. (Note: Fatality count (flight): 49 (501), 101 (502) and 91 (508))

About a year after the accident, a monument—a large white cross with an attached nameplate—was erected on the spot of the crash site to commemorate the victims of LANSA flight 502. In 2006, because of encroaching development, the Peruvian owner of the land where the memorial was originally located, under pressure from the U.S. Senator from New York, Charles E. Schumer, the U.S. Department of State and the U.S. Consulate General in Peru, agreed to relocate the memorial 46 m (150 ft) away to protect the site.

== See also ==
- LANSA Flight 508, aviation disaster in 1971 also with a sole survivor
- List of accidents and incidents involving commercial aircraft
- List of sole survivors of aviation accidents and incidents
