= Cacra District =

Coordinates: 12.8127°S 75.7831°W

Cacra
- District
- Interactive map of Cacra
- Country: Peru
- Region: Lima
- Province: Yauyos
- Founded: July 15, 1936
- Capital: Cacra

Government
  - Mayor: Taumaturgo Proculo Ordoñez Molleda

Area
  - Total: 213.79 km^{2} (82.54 sq mi)
- Elevation: 2,790 m (9,150 ft)

Population (2005 census)
  - Total: 1,167
  - Density: 5.459/km^{2} (14.14/sq mi)
- Time zone: UTC-5 (PET)
- UBIGEO: 151006

Cacra District is one of thirty-three districts of the province Yauyos in Peru.
