= Catahuasi District =

Coordinates: 12.7997°S 75.8919°W

Catahuasi
- District
- Interactive map of Catahuasi
- Country: Peru
- Region: Lima
- Province: Yauyos
- Founded: June 6, 1986
- Capital: Catahuasi

Government
  - Mayor: Josias Sergio Luciani Mateo

Area
  - Total: 123.86 km^{2} (47.82 sq mi)
- Elevation: 1,179 m (3,868 ft)

Population (2005 census)
  - Total: 1,310
  - Density: 10.6/km^{2} (27.4/sq mi)
- Time zone: UTC-5 (PET)
- UBIGEO: 151008

Catahuasi District is one of thirty-three districts of the province Yauyos in Peru.
