= Huascacocha (Lima) =

Lake in Peru

- Location within Peru
- Location: Peru; Lima Region
- Coordinates: 12°18′31.9″S 75°58′33.3″W

Huascacocha or Wask'aqucha (Quechua wask'a rectangle / long, qucha lake, "rectangle lake" or "long lake", Hispanicized spelling Huascacocha) is a lake in Peru located in the Lima Region, Yauyos Province, Ayaviri District, Yauyos quinches District. It is situated at a height of about 4,250 metres (13,944 ft). Huascacocha lies between the mountains Huayna Cotoni and Qutuni in the north and Llongote in the south, southeast of the lake Tikllaqucha.
