= Winsu =

Mountain in Peru

- Location within Peru

Highest point
- Elevation: 5,000 m (16,000 ft)
- Coordinates: 12°12′34″S 75°51′17″W

Geography
- Location: Peru, Lima Region
- Parent range: Andes, Cordillera Central

Winsu (Quechua for firstborn child, also spelled Huinso) is mountain in the Cordillera Central in the Andes of Peru which reaches a height of approximately 5,000 metres (16,404 ft). It is located in the Lima Region, Yauyos Province, on the border of the districts of Miraflores and Vitis.
