= Cochas District, Yauyos =

Coordinates: 12°17′47″S 76°09′32″W

Cochas
- District
- Interactive map of Cochas
- Country: Peru
- Region: Lima
- Province: Yauyos
- Founded: July 22, 1960
- Capital: Cochas

Government
  - Mayor: Prudencio Pablo Javier Lopez

Area
  - Total: 27.73 km^{2} (10.71 sq mi)
- Elevation: 2,831 m (9,288 ft)

Population (2005 census)
  - Total: 106
  - Density: 3.82/km^{2} (9.90/sq mi)
- Time zone: UTC-5 (PET)
- UBIGEO: 151010

Cochas District is one of thirty-three districts of the province Yauyos in Peru.
