= Viñac District =

Coordinates: 12.9305°S 75.7805°W

Viñac Wiñaq
- District
- Interactive map of Viñac
- Country: Peru
- Region: Lima
- Province: Yauyos
- Capital: Viñac

Government
  - Mayor: Teodardo Dionisio Carrion Huaman

Area
  - Total: 165.23 km^{2} (63.80 sq mi)
- Elevation: 3,315 m (10,876 ft)

Population (2005 census)
  - Total: 1,914
  - Density: 11.58/km^{2} (30.00/sq mi)
- Time zone: UTC-5 (PET)
- UBIGEO: 151032

Viñac District is one of thirty-three districts of the Yauyos Province in the Lima Region of Peru.
