= Pirca Pirca, Lima =

Archaeological site in Peru

Pirca Pirca
- Location within Peru
- 12°4′25″S 76°00′34″W
- Location: Yauyos Province, Lima Region, Peru

Pirca Pirca (possibly from Aymara and Quechua pirqa wall) is an archaeological site in Peru. It is located in the Lima Region, Yauyos Province, Tanta District. Pirca Pirca was declared a National Cultural Heritage of Peru by Resolución Viceministerial No. 011-2013-VMPCIC-MC on February 7, 2013. It lies north of Lake Paucarcocha.

== See also ==
- Khuchi Mach'ay
