= Carania District =

Coordinates: 12.3455°S 75.8697°W

Carania
- District
- Interactive map of Carania
- Country: Peru
- Region: Lima
- Province: Yauyos
- Founded: December 3, 1901
- Capital: Carania

Government
  - Mayor: Hilario Miguel Clemente Reyes

Area
  - Total: 122.13 km^{2} (47.15 sq mi)
- Elevation: 3,827 m (12,556 ft)

Population (2005 census)
  - Total: 335
  - Density: 2.74/km^{2} (7.10/sq mi)
- Time zone: UTC-5 (PET)
- UBIGEO: 151007

Carania District is one of thirty-three districts of the province Yauyos in Peru.

== See also ==
- Kiwyu
- Llunk'uti
- Wamanmarka
