= Upyanqa =

Mountain in Peru

- Location within Peru

Highest point
- Elevation: 5,300 m (17,400 ft)
- Coordinates: 12°32′41″S 75°46′57″W

Geography
- Location: Peru, Lima Region
- Parent range: Andes, Cordillera Central

Upyanqa (Quechua upyay to drink, -nqa an archaic nominalising suffix to indicate a place destinated for something, "(a place) for drinking", hispanicized spelling Upianca) is a mountain in the Cordillera Central in the Andes of Peru which reaches an altitude of approximately 5,300 m (17,400 ft). It is located in the Lima Region, Yauyos Province, in the districts of Colonia and Huantan, north and northeast of a lake and a mountain named Wankarqucha. Upyanqaqucha is the name of a small lake northwest of Upyanqa.
