= Huangascar District =

Coordinates: 12.8990°S 75.8315°W

Huangascar
- District
- Interactive map of Huangascar
- Country: Peru
- Region: Lima
- Province: Yauyos
- Capital: Huangascar

Government
  - Mayor: Sabino Falconieri Lazaro Quispe

Area
  - Total: 50.46 km^{2} (19.48 sq mi)
- Elevation: 2,537 m (8,323 ft)

Population (2005 census)
  - Total: 724
  - Density: 14.3/km^{2} (37.2/sq mi)
- Time zone: UTC-5 (PET)
- UBIGEO: 151015

Huangascar District is one of thirty-three districts of the province Yauyos in Peru.
