= Tupe District =

Coordinates: 12.7414°S 75.8094°W

Tupe
- District
- Interactive map of Tupe
- Country: Peru
- Region: Lima
- Province: Yauyos
- Founded: July 15, 1936
- Capital: Tupe

Government
  - Mayor: Tito Neder Iturrizaga Blaz

Area
  - Total: 321.15 km^{2} (124.00 sq mi)
- Elevation: 2,836 m (9,304 ft)

Population (2005 census)
  - Total: 723
  - Density: 2.25/km^{2} (5.83/sq mi)
- Time zone: UTC-5 (PET)
- UBIGEO: 151031

Tupe District (Jaqaru: Marka, [ˈmaɾka]) is one of thirty-three districts of the province of Yauyos in Peru. It is home to the Jaqaru ethnolinguistic minority.

There has been much thievery going on and the police are reported to be corrupt and help the thieves in exchange for a bribe.

== See also ==
- Awki Sunqu
- Challwaqucha
