= Huampara District =

Coordinates: 12°21′39″S 76°09′58″W

Huampara
- District
- Interactive map of Huampara
- Country: Peru
- Region: Lima
- Province: Yauyos
- Founded: May 13, 1936
- Capital: Huampara

Area
  - Total: 54.03 km^{2} (20.86 sq mi)
- Elevation: 2,478 m (8,130 ft)

Population (2005 census)
  - Total: 286
  - Density: 5.29/km^{2} (13.7/sq mi)
- Time zone: UTC-5 (PET)
- UBIGEO: 151013

Huampara District is one of thirty-three districts of the province Yauyos in Peru.
