= San Joaquín District, Peru =

Coordinates: 12.2841°S 76.1469°W

San Joaquín District
- District
- Interactive map of San Joaquín District
- Country: Peru
- Region: Lima
- Province: Yauyos
- Founded: October 11, 1954
- Capital: San Joaquín

Area
  - Total: 41.24 km^{2} (15.92 sq mi)
- Elevation: 2,947 m (9,669 ft)

Population (2005 census)
  - Total: 243
  - Density: 5.89/km^{2} (15.3/sq mi)
- Time zone: UTC-5 (PET)
- UBIGEO: 151026

San Joaquín District is one of thirty-three districts of the province Yauyos in Peru.

== See also ==
- Runchu
