= Lincha District =

Coordinates: 12.7998°S 75.6672°W

Lincha
- District
- Interactive map of Lincha
- Country: Peru
- Region: Lima
- Province: Yauyos
- Founded: July 7, 1959
- Capital: Lincha

Government
  - Mayor: León Jorge Guerra Vicente

Area
  - Total: 221.22 km^{2} (85.41 sq mi)
- Elevation: 3,458 m (11,345 ft)

Population (2005 census)
  - Total: 896
  - Density: 4.05/km^{2} (10.5/sq mi)
- Time zone: UTC-5 (PET)
- UBIGEO: 151019

Lincha District is one of thirty-three districts of the province Yauyos in Peru.
