= Waylla Waqran =

Mountain in Peru

- Location within Peru

Highest point
- Elevation: 4,600 m (15,100 ft)
- Coordinates: 12°12′51″S 75°47′14″W

Geography
- Location: Peru, Lima Region
- Parent range: Andes, Cordillera Central

Waylla Waqran (Quechua waylla meadow, waqra horn, "meadow horn", -n a suffix, also spelled Huayllahuacrán) is mountain in the Cordillera Central in the Andes of Peru which reaches a height of approximately 4,600 metres (15,092 ft). It is located in the Lima Region, Yauyos Province, on the border of the districts of Huancaya and Vitis.
