= Pikiqucha =

Lake in Peru

- Location within Peru
- Location: Lima Region
- Coordinates: 12°15′11″S 75°48′36″W
- Basin countries: Peru

Pikiqucha (Quechua piki flea, qucha lake, "flea lake", hispanicized spellings Piquecocha, Piquicocha) is a lake in Peru. It is situated in the Lima Region, Yauyos Province, Vitis District, south of Vitis.

== See also ==
- List of lakes in Peru
