= Qiwllaqucha (Lima) =

Lake in Peru

- Location within Peru
- Location: Peru; Lima Region
- Coordinates: 12°06′01″S 75°44′41″W
- Max. length: 1.14 km (0.71 mi)
- Max. width: 0.34 km (0.21 mi)
- Surface elevation: 4,353 m (14,281 ft)

Qiwllaqucha (Quechua qillwa, qiwlla, qiwiña gull, qucha lake, "gull lake", Hispanicized spelling Quiulacocha, Quiullacocha) is a lake in Peru located in the Lima Region, Yauyos Province, Tomas District. It is situated at a height of about 4,353 metres (14,281 ft), about 1.14 km long and 0.34 km at its widest point. Qiwllaqucha lies in the north of the district, south of the lakes Qarwaqucha and Wichqaqucha and north west of the lakes Pachas and Kunturmach'ay.
