= Awki Sunqu =

Mountain in Peru

- Location within Peru

Highest point
- Elevation: 5,050 m (16,570 ft)
- Coordinates: 12°34′36″S 75°36′47″W

Geography
- Location: Peru, Lima Region
- Parent range: Andes, Cordillera Central

Awki Sunqu (Quechua awki prince; a mythical figure of the Andean culture; grandfather, sunqu heart, "the prince's (Awki's or grandfather's) heart", Hispanicized spelling Auquisonco) is a mountain in the Cordillera Central in the Andes of Peru which reaches an altitude of approximately 5,050 m (16,570 ft). It is located in the Lima Region, Yauyos Province, in the districts of Huantan and Tupe. It lies west of the lakes named Wich'iqucha and Quylluqucha, south of Chuntani.
