= Yauyos =

- Town
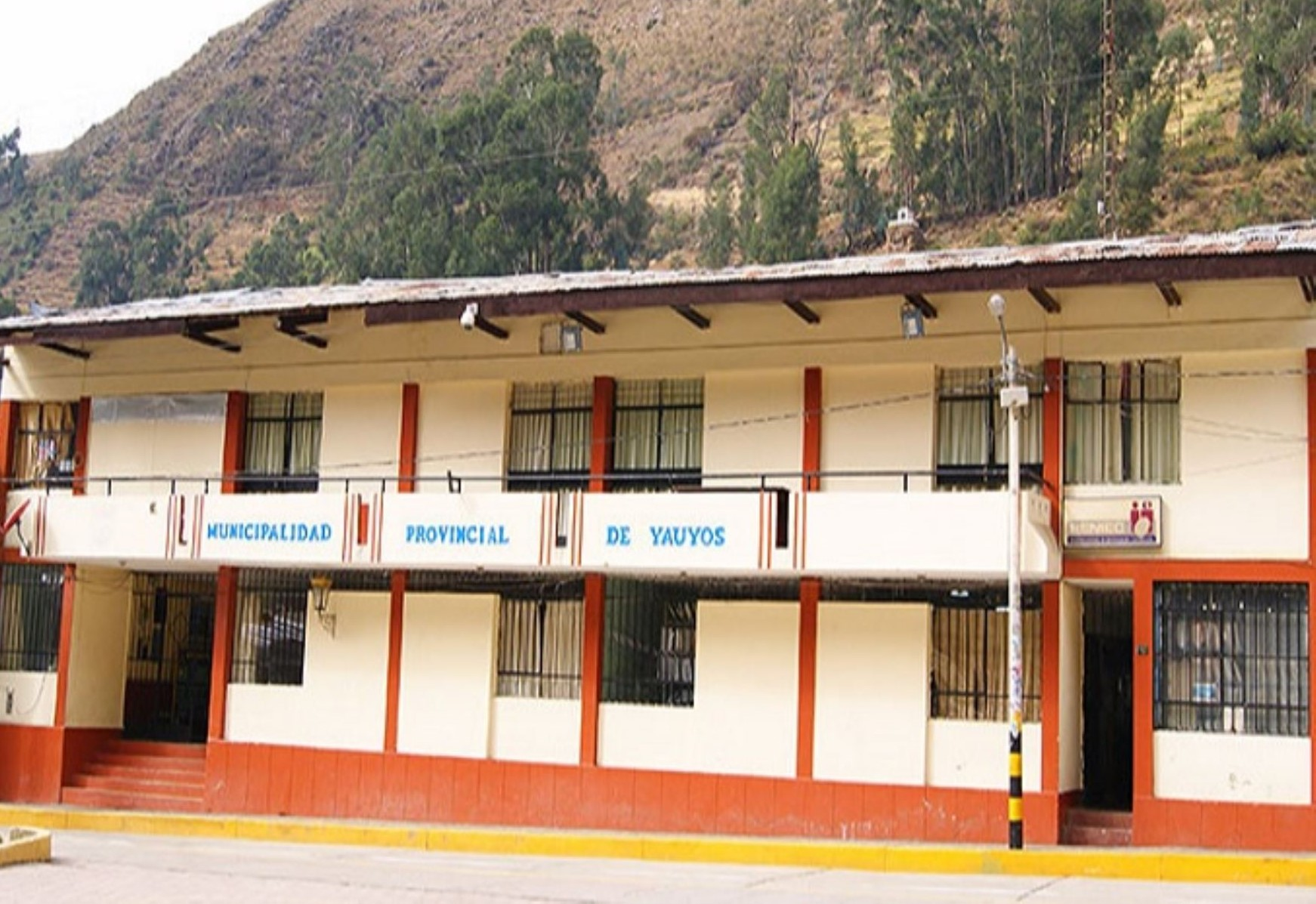
- Yauyos in 2021

- Location within Peru
- Coordinates: 12.4594°S 75.9072°W
- Country: Peru
- Region: Lima
- Province: Yauyos
- District: Yauyos

Government
  - Mayor: Elva Filomena Dionisio Inga (2019-2022)
- Elevation: 2,874 m (9,429 ft)
- Time zone: UTC-5 (PET)

Yauyos is a town in Central Peru, capital of the province Yauyos in the region Lima. The city is the seat of the Territorial Prelature of Yauyos.
