= Puma Ranra (Lima) =

Mountain in Peru

- Location within Peru

Highest point
- Elevation: 5,200 m (17,100 ft)
- Coordinates: 12°26′58″S 75°44′35″W

Geography
- Location: Peru, Lima Region
- Parent range: Andes, Cordillera Central

Puma Ranra (Quechua puma cougar, puma, ranra stony, stony place, also spelled Pumarangra) is a mountain in the Cordillera Central in the Andes of Peru which reaches an altitude of approximately 5,200 m (17,100 ft). It is situated in the Lima Region, Yauyos Province, in the districts of Huantan and Laraos.
