= Huancaya District =

Coordinates: 12.2034°S 75.7993°W

Huancaya
- District
- Interactive map of Huancaya
- Country: Peru
- Region: Lima
- Province: Yauyos
- Founded: November 15, 1915
- Capital: Huancaya

Government
  - Mayor: Abanto Justo Miranda Ravichagua

Area
  - Total: 283.6 km^{2} (109.5 sq mi)
- Elevation: 3,554 m (11,660 ft)

Population (2005 census)
  - Total: 484
  - Density: 1.71/km^{2} (4.42/sq mi)
- Time zone: UTC-5 (PET)
- UBIGEO: 151014

Huancaya District is one of thirty-three districts of the province Yauyos in Peru.

== Geography ==
The Cordillera Central traverses the district. Some of the highest mountains of the district are listed below:

- Atuq Sayk'u
- Chaka Marka
- Ch'ampa Pata
- Kachi Raqra
- Kima Rumi
- Kuntur Wachanan
- Liyun Mach'ay
- Marayniyuq
- Muki
- Pukyu Pata
- Pukyu Rumi
- Puywan Urqu
- Q'ara Mach'ay
- Rinriyuq
- Sankha Ukru
- Silla Pata
- Wamanripa
- Waylla Ñawin
- Waylla Waqran
- Yana Salla
- Yuraq Ñan

== See also ==
- Papaqucha
