= Muchka =

Mountain in Peru

- Location within Peru

Highest point
- Elevation: 4,600 m (15,100 ft)
- Coordinates: 12°15′29″S 75°47′32″W

Geography
- Location: Peru, Lima Region
- Parent range: Andes, Cordillera Central

Muchka (Quechua for mortar, also spelled Muchca) is a mountain in the Cordillera Central in the Andes of Peru which reaches a height of approximately 4,600 metres (15,092 ft). It is located in the Lima Region, Yauyos Province, on the border of the districts of Alis and Vitis, northwest of Alis.
