= LANSA (Peru) =

Peruvian airline (1963–1972)

Lineas Aéreas Nacionales S.A.
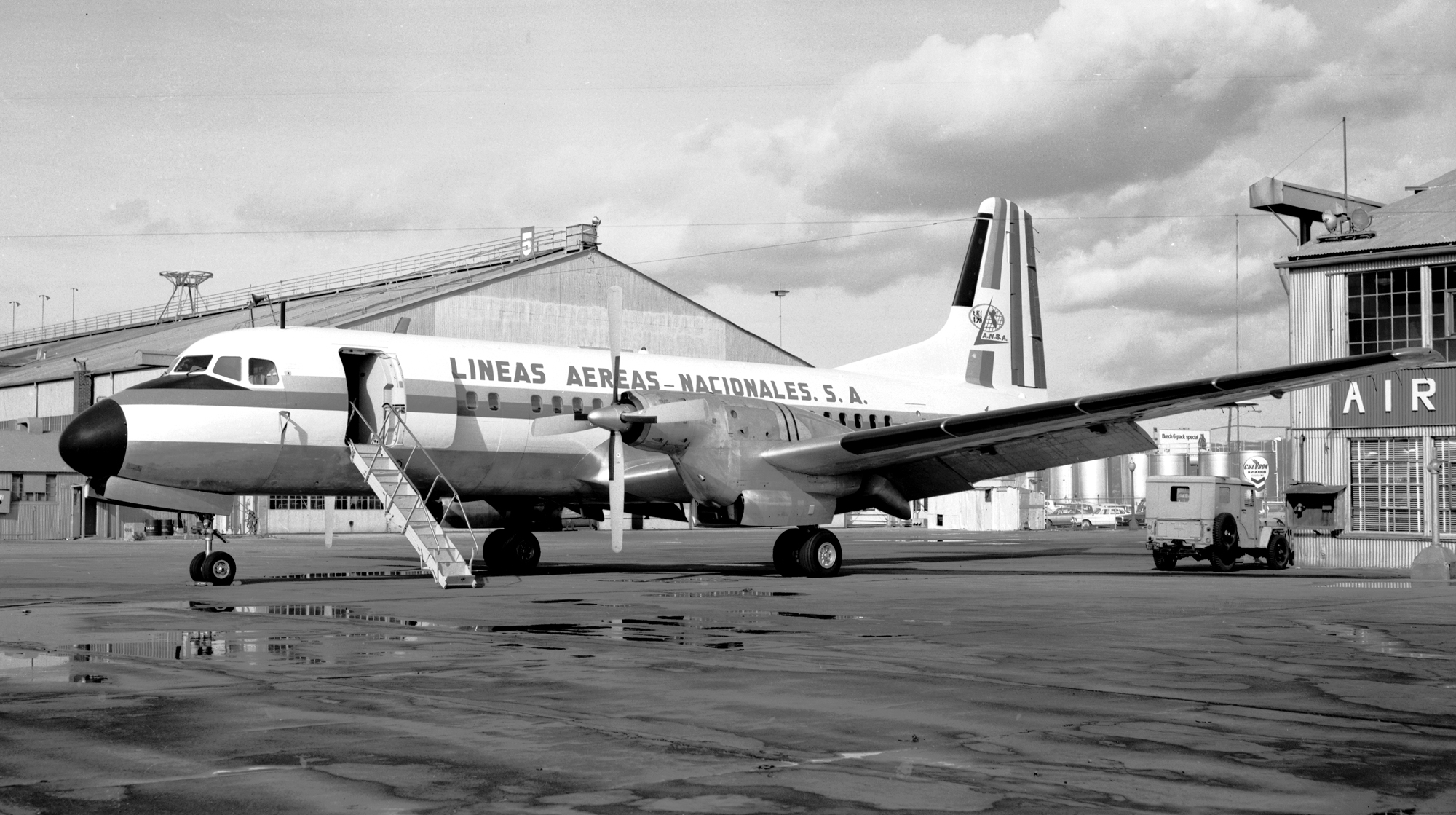
- A NAMC YS-11 at Oakland International Airport in 1967
| IATA | ICAO | Call sign |
|---|---|---|
| - | - | - |
- Founded: 1963
- Ceased operations: January 4, 1972
- Hubs: Jorge Chavez International Airport
- Focus cities: Cusco; Pucallpa
- Fleet size: 19
- Destinations: 11
- Headquarters: Lima, Peru
- Key people: Juan Checa (President)

Lineas Aéreas Nacionales S.A. (commonly known as LANSA) was a Peruvian commercial airline headquartered in Lima, Peru, which was established in 1963. After its last Lockheed Electra crashed on Christmas Eve 1971, LANSA ceased operation, and lost its operating authority on January 4, 1972, when its working capital was exhausted.

== History ==
LANSA was founded in 1963, and began flight operations in January 1964 with internal connections. In 1965 33.3% was bought by Eastern Air Lines. From May to September 1966, the company suspended its flight activities while undergoing far-reaching reorganization and passed completely under Peruvian control. With the arrival of the NAMC YS-11 in 1967, LANSA increased the number of flights to 9 national airports, including Cuzco and Iquitos.

By January 4, 1972, the Peruvian government revoked LANSA's operating certificate. The airline had already ceased all operations, following the crash of Flight 508 in which its last airworthy Lockheed L-188 Electra was lost on December 24, 1971. All other aircraft had already been phased out, were lost in accidents or grounded in Lima as inoperative.

== Destinations ==
- Peru
  - Arequipa (Rodríguez Ballón International Airport)
  - Cusco (Alejandro Velasco Astete International Airport)
  - Huancayo (Francisco Carle Airport)
  - Iquitos (Coronel FAP Francisco Secada Vignetta International Airport)
  - Lima (Jorge Chavez International Airport)
  - Piura (FAP Captain Guillermo Concha Iberico International Airport)
  - Pucallpa (Pucallpa Airport)
  - Tacna (Coronel FAP Carlos Ciriani Santa Rosa International Airport)
  - Trujillo (FAP Captain Carlos Martínez de Pinillos International Airport)
- Honduras
  - La Ceiba (Golosón International Airport)
- United States
  - Miami (Miami International Airport)

== Fleet ==
Over the years, LANSA operated the following aircraft:

- 9 Lockheed L-749 Constellation
- 2 Lockheed L-1049 Super Constellation
- 4 Lockheed L-188A Electra
- 4 NAMC YS-11

== Accidents and incidents ==
- 27 April 1966, LANSA Flight 501, Tomas, Peru, 49 fatalities
- 9 August 1970, LANSA Flight 502, Cusco, Peru, 101 fatalities
- 24 December 1971, LANSA Flight 508, Puerto Inca, Peru, 91 fatalities
