= Yauyos District, Yauyos =

Peruvian district in Yauyos Province

Coordinates: 12.4597°S 75.9187°W

Yauyos Yawyu
- District
- Interactive map of Yauyos
- Country: Peru
- Region: Lima
- Province: Yauyos
- Capital: Yauyos

Government
  - Mayor: Elva Filomena Dionisio Inga (2019-2022)

Area
  - Total: 327.17 km^{2} (126.32 sq mi)
- Elevation: 2,874 m (9,429 ft)

Population (2017)
  - Total: 1,481
  - Density: 4.527/km^{2} (11.72/sq mi)
- Time zone: UTC-5 (PET)
- UBIGEO: 151001

Yauyos District is one of thirty-three districts of the Yauyos Province in Peru.

== Geography ==
One of the highest peaks of the district is Llunk'uti at approximately 5,780 m (18,960 ft). Other mountains are listed below:

- Awki Marka
- Chuqi Marka
- Ch'uspi
- Kiwyu
- Kuraq Marka
- Ñawpa Wasi
- Pallpa
- Qullpacha
- Tampu
- Wiqu
- Yawar Qucha
