= Azángaro District, Yauyos =

Coordinates: 13.0000°S 75.8369°W

Azángaro
- District
- Interactive map of Azángaro
- Country: Peru
- Region: Lima
- Province: Yauyos
- Founded: February 15, 1955
- Capital: Azángaro

Government
  - Mayor: Adler Lino Gutierrez Chuquispuma

Area
  - Total: 79.84 km^{2} (30.83 sq mi)
- Elevation: 3,465 m (11,368 ft)

Population (2005 census)
  - Total: 696
  - Density: 8.72/km^{2} (22.6/sq mi)
- Time zone: UTC-5 (PET)
- UBIGEO: 151005

Azángaro District is one of thirty-three districts of the province Yauyos in Peru.
