= Wamanmarka, Lima =

Archaeological site in Peru

Coordinates: 12.3746°S 75.8579°W

Wamanmarka
- Interactive map of Wamanmarka
- Location: Lima Region, Peru
- Region: Andes

Site notes
- Height: 3,800 m (12,500 ft)

Wamanmarka or Waman Marka (Quechua waman falcon, marka village, Hispanicized spelling Huamanmarca) is a pre-Hispanic archaeological site in the Lima Region of Peru. It was declared a National Cultural Heritage by Resolución Directoral Nacional No. 326/INC on October 30, 1997. Wamanmarka is located in the Yauyos Province, Carania District, at a height of 3,800 m (12,500 ft).
