= Sapallan Warmi =

Mountain in Peru

- Location within Peru

Highest point
- Elevation: 4,800 m (15,700 ft)
- Coordinates: 12°19′09″S 75°41′36″W

Geography
- Location: Peru, Lima Region
- Parent range: Andes, Cordillera Central

Sapallan Warmi (Quechua sapalla only, unique, -n a suffix, warmi woman, also spelled Sapallanhuarmi) is a mountain in the Cordillera Central in the Andes of Peru which reaches a height of approximately 4,800 metres (15,748 ft). It is located in the Lima Region, Yauyos Province, Alis District.
