= Tauripampa District =

Coordinates: 12°36′56″S 76°09′36″W

Tauripampa Tawripampa
- District
- Interactive map of Tauripampa
- Country: Peru
- Region: Lima
- Province: Yauyos
- Capital: Tauripampa

Government
  - Mayor: Joaquin Marcial Escalante Saavedra

Area
  - Total: 530.86 km^{2} (204.97 sq mi)
- Elevation: 3,519 m (11,545 ft)

Population (2005 census)
  - Total: 648
  - Density: 1.22/km^{2} (3.16/sq mi)
- Time zone: UTC-5 (PET)
- UBIGEO: 151029

Tauripampa District is one of thirty-three districts of the province Yauyos in Peru.
