= Marayniyuq (Yauyos) =

Mountain in Peru

- Location within Peru

Highest point
- Elevation: 4,800 m (15,700 ft)
- Coordinates: 12°02′47″S 75°50′13″W

Geography
- Location: Peru, Lima Region
- Parent range: Andes, Cordillera Central

Marayniyuq (Quechua maran, maray batan or grindstone, maray to tear down, to knock down, -ni, -yuq suffixes, "the one with the grind stone", also spelled Marayniyoc) is a mountain in the Cordillera Central in the Andes of Peru which reaches a height of approximately 4,800 metres (15,748 ft). It is located in the Lima Region, Yauyos Province, Huancaya District.
