= Muki (Huancaya-Tomas) =

Mountain in Peru

- Location within Peru

Highest point
- Elevation: 4,800 m (15,700 ft)
- Coordinates: 12°06′51″S 75°45′29″W

Geography
- Location: Peru, Lima Region
- Parent range: Andes, Cordillera Central

Muki (Quechua for asphyxia, also for a goblin who lives in caves, also spelled Muqui) is a mountain in the Cordillera Central in the Andes of Peru which reaches a height of approximately 4,800 metres (15,748 ft). It is located in the Lima Region, Yauyos Province, on the border of the districts of Huancaya and Tomas.
