= Ñawinpukyu (Lima) =

Lake in Peru

- Location within Peru
- Location: Peru; Lima Region
- Coordinates: 12°07′15″S 75°38′46″W

Ñawinpuyku (Quechua ñawi button hole / eye, -n a suffix, pukyu spring of water / source / well, hispanicized spelling Ñahuinpuquio) is a lake in Peru located in the Lima Region, Yauyos Province, Tomas District. Ñawinpukyu is situated near the eastern border of the district, southeast of the village Kimsakancha (Quimsacancha) and northwest of the village Yanamach'ay.
