= Omas District =

Coordinates: 12°30′53″S 76°17′21″W

Omas Umas
- District
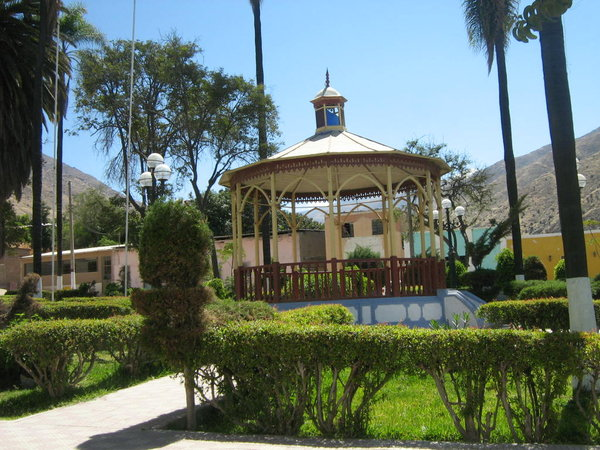
- Plaza de Armas of Omas, Peru
- Interactive map of Omas
- Country: Peru
- Region: Lima
- Province: Yauyos
- Founded: July 28, 1821
- Capital: Omas

Government
  - Mayor: Luis Alberto Ponce Fernandez

Area
  - Total: 295.35 km^{2} (114.04 sq mi)
- Elevation: 1,539 m (5,049 ft)

Population (2005 census)
  - Total: 686
  - Density: 2.32/km^{2} (6.02/sq mi)
- Time zone: UTC-5 (PET)
- UBIGEO: 151022

Omas District is one of thirty-three districts of the province Yauyos in Peru.
