= San Pedro de Pilas District =

Coordinates: 12.4545°S 76.2266°W

San Pedro de Pilas
- District
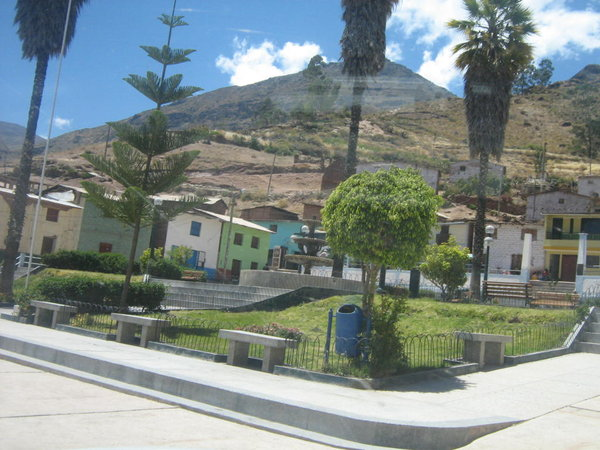
- San Pedro de Pilas
- Interactive map of San Pedro de Pilas
- Country: Peru
- Region: Lima
- Province: Yauyos
- Founded: October 11, 1957
- Capital: San Pedro de Pilas

Government
  - Mayor: Melquiades Quispe

Area
  - Total: 97.39 km^{2} (37.60 sq mi)
- Elevation: 2,656 m (8,714 ft)

Population (2005 census)
  - Total: 453
  - Density: 4.65/km^{2} (12.0/sq mi)
- Time zone: UTC-5 (PET)
- UBIGEO: 151027

San Pedro de Pilas District is one of thirty-three districts of the province Yauyos in Peru.
