= Llongote =

Mountain in Peru

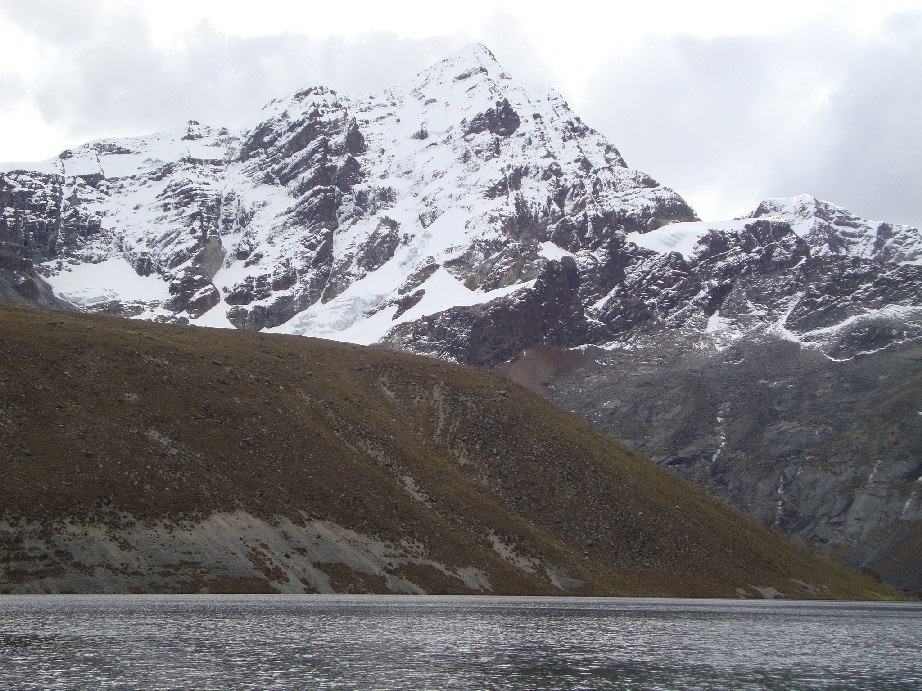
- Llongote

Highest point
- Elevation: 5,780 m (18,960 ft)
- Coordinates: 12°19′45″S 75°56′53″W

Geography
- Location within Peru
- Location: Peru, Lima Region
- Parent range: Andes, Cordillera Central

Llongote is a mountain in the Cordillera Central in the Andes of Peru which reaches a height of approximately 5,780 metres (18,963 ft). It is located in the Lima Region, Yauyos Province, in the districts of Ayaviri, Carania and Yauyos. Llongote lies south of Qutuni and southeast of Huayna Cotoni and the lake named Huascacocha. It is situated on the southern border of the Nor Yauyos-Cochas Landscape Reserve.
