= Paquchi (Peru) =

Mountain in Peru

- Location within Peru

Highest point
- Elevation: 5,000 m (16,000 ft)
- Coordinates: 12°32′40″S 75°39′52″W

Geography
- Location: Peru, Lima Region
- Parent range: Andes, Cordillera Central

Paquchi (Aymara for reddish, light brown, also spelled Pacuche) is a mountain in the Cordillera Central in the Andes of Peru which reaches a height of approximately 5,000 metres (16,404 ft). It is located in the Lima Region, Yauyos Province, Huantán District.
