= Cuchi Machay =

Archaeological site in Peru

Khuchi Mach'ay
- Location: Peru, Lima Region, Yauyos Province
- Region: Andes

Cuchi Machay (possibly from in the Quechua spelling Khuchi Mach'ay or Khuchimach'ay, khuchi pig, mach'ay cave, "pig cave") is an archaeological site with rock paintings in Peru. It is located in the Lima Region, Yauyos Province, Tanta District. Cuchi Machay was declared a National Cultural Heritage of Peru by Resolución Viceministerial No. 011-2013-VMPCIC-MC on February 7, 2013.

Cuchi Machay lies near the lakes Mullucocha and La Escalera.
