= Pukyu Rumi =

Mountain in Peru

- Location within Peru

Highest point
- Elevation: 4,800 m (15,700 ft)
- Coordinates: 12°02′45″S 75°55′28″W

Geography
- Location: Peru, Lima Region
- Parent range: Andes, Cordillera Central

Pukyu Rumi (Quechua pukyu spring, well, rumi stone, "spring stone", also spelled Puquiorumi) is a mountain in the Cordillera Central in the Andes of Peru which reaches a height of approximately 4,800 metres (15,748 ft). It is located in the Lima Region, Yauyos Province, on the border of the districts of Huancaya and Tanta.
