= Siq'i =

Mountain in Peru

- Location within Peru

Highest point
- Elevation: 5,075 m (16,650 ft)
- Coordinates: 12°31′14″S 75°36′40″W

Geography
- Location: Peru, Lima Region
- Parent range: Andes, Cordillera Central

Siq'i (Quechua for scratch, Hispanicized spelling Sique) is a 5,075-metre-high (16,650 ft) mountain in the Cordillera Central in the Andes of Peru. It is located in the Lima Region, Yauyos Province, in the districts of Huantan and Laraos. It lies between two groups of lakes northeast of Awki Sunqu and Chuntani and southeast of Misitu.
