= Madean District =

Coordinates: 12°56′42″S 75°48′39″W

Madean
- District
- Interactive map of Madean
- Country: Peru
- Region: Lima
- Province: Yauyos
- Founded: March 26, 1965
- Capital: Madean

Government
  - Mayor: Arturo Díaz Reynoso

Area
  - Total: 220.72 km^{2} (85.22 sq mi)
- Elevation: 3,300 m (10,800 ft)

Population (2017)
  - Total: 570
  - Density: 2.6/km^{2} (6.7/sq mi)
- Time zone: UTC-5 (PET)
- UBIGEO: 151020

Madean District is one of thirty-three districts of the province Yauyos in Peru.
