= Madean Peak =

Mountain in Alaska, United States

Coordinates: 61°22′44″N 146°44′31″W

Madean Peak is a summit in Copper River Census Area, Alaska, in the United States. With an elevation of 7,618 feet (2,322 m), Madean Peak is the 217th highest summit in the state of Alaska.

Madean Peak was named in the 1950s.
