= Kaywa =

Mountain in Peru

- Location within Peru

Highest point
- Elevation: 4,800 m (15,700 ft)
- Coordinates: 12°34′17″S 75°34′01″W

Geography
- Location: Peru, Huancavelica Region, Junín Region
- Parent range: Andes

Kaywa (Quechua for a Cyclanthera species, (Cyclanthera pedata or Cyclanthera brachybotrys) Hispanicized spelling Cayhua) is a mountain in the Andes of Peru, about 4,800 m (15,748 ft) high. It is situated in the Huancavelica Region, Huancavelica Province, Acobambilla District, and in the Lima Region, Yauyos Province, Huantán District. Kaywa lies west of Wich'iqucha and northwest of Quylluqucha.
