= Ticlla (mountain) =

Mountain in Peru

- Qutuni
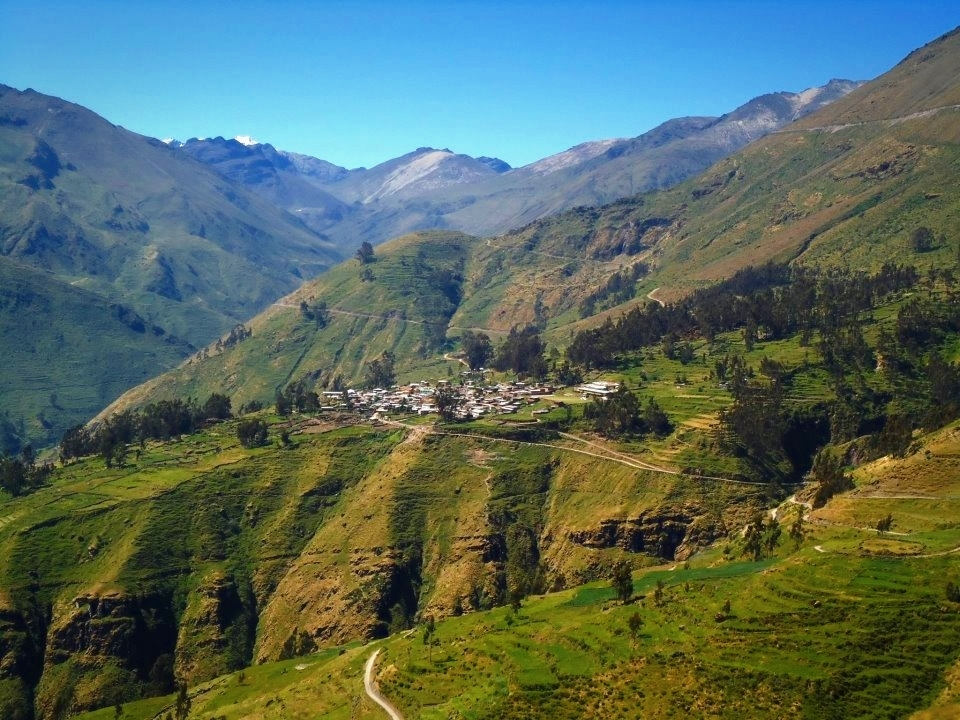
- Snow-covered mountains northeast of Ayaviri where Tiklla is situated

Highest point
- Elevation: 5,897 m (19,347 ft)
- Coordinates: 12°15′23″S 75°57′24″W

Geography
- Location within Peru
- Location: Lima Region, Peru
- Parent range: Andes, Cordillera Central, Pichqa Waqra

Climbing
- First ascent: 1-1963 from west: From E., difficult-1966: S.E. face to 5600m (ice)-1987

Ticlla or Qutuni (Aymara qutu heap, pile, -ni a suffix to indicate ownership, "the one with a heap", Hispanicized spellings Cotoni, Cutuni), also called Tiklla (Quechua for eyelash; two-colored, Hispanicized spellings Ticcla, Ticlla) or Tiqlla (Quechua for 'with alternating colors'), is a 5,897-metre-high (19,347 ft) mountain in the Cordillera Central in the Andes of Peru. Strictly speaking the popular name Ticlla refers to a group of peaks of the Qutuni-Ticlla cirque. The highest mountain of the massif is named Qutuni. It lies in a sub-range of the Cordillera Central named Pichqa Waqra (Quechua for "five horns", also spelled Pichcahuajra).

It is located in the Lima Region, Yauyos Province, on the border of the districts Ayaviri, Miraflores and Tanta. It lies on the southern border of the Nor Yauyos-Cochas Landscape Reserve. Ticlla is situated southeast Aqupallqa and the lake named Tikllaqucha, northeast of Wayna Qutuni ("young Qutuni") and north of Llunk'uti and the lake named Wask'aqucha. One of the nearest villages is Qutuni (Cutuni), situated west of the mountain.
