= T'uruyuq =

Mountain in Peru

- Location within Peru

Highest point
- Elevation: 5,400 m (17,700 ft)
- Coordinates: 12°25′14″S 75°39′58″W

Geography
- Location: Peru, Lima Region
- Parent range: Andes, Cordillera Central

T'uruyuq (Quechua t'uru mud, -yuq a suffix, "the one with mud", Hispanicized spelling Toroyoc) is a mountain in the Cordillera Central in the Andes of Peru which reaches an altitude of approximately 5,400 m (17,700 ft). It is located in the Lima Region, Yauyos Province, in the districts of Huantan and Laraos. T'uruyuq lies southwest of Lanranyuq and northeast of Wamp'una.
