= Wankarqucha =

Mountain in Peru

- Location within Peru

Highest point
- Elevation: 5,271 m (17,293 ft)
- Coordinates: 12°34′58″S 75°47′25″W

Geography
- Location: Peru, Lima Region
- Parent range: Andes, Cordillera Central

Wankarqucha (Quechua wankar a kind of drum, qucha lake, "drum lake", Hispanicized spelling Huancarcocha) is a 5,271-metre-high (17,293 ft) mountain in the Cordillera Central in the Andes of Peru and the name of the lake at its feet. It is situated in the Lima Region, Yauyos Province, in the districts of Colonia and Huantan.

The lake named Wankarqucha lies south of the mountain at 12°36′31″S 75°47′21″W.
