= National School of Sciences and Arts of Cuzco =

School in Peru

Coordinates: 13.5192°S 71.9818°W

Colegio Nacional de Ciencias y Artes del Cuzco
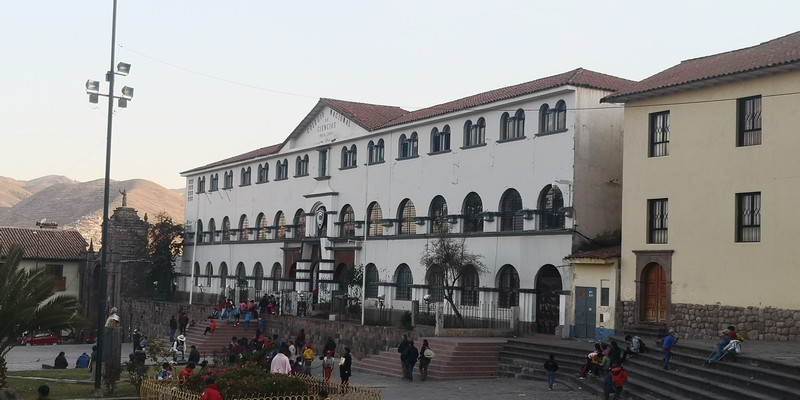
- Cuzco; Peru

Information
- Type: Public School (I.E.E.)
- Motto: ¡Ciencias glorioso! ¡Por siempre victorioso! (Sciences [school] victorious! For ever victorious!)
- Established: 8 July 1825
- Founder: Simón Bolívar

The National School of Sciences and Arts of Cuzco (Spanish: Colegio Nacional de Ciencias y Artes del Cuzco) is a public school in Cuzco, Peru. According to the Congress of Peru, it's the oldest school in Peru.

The school was founded by Simón Bolívar by Decree of July 8, 1825 on the basis of the old San Bernardo School erected for the children of the conquistadores and the San Francisco de Borja School, whose objective was to teach the first letters to the children of the caciques. The premises of the Jesuits were given as the premises and as income those that belonged to the Bethlehemites, to the consolidated schools, to the Census Fund, and to the temporalities of the department.

Since 1972 the property is part of the Monumental Zone of Cuzco declared as a Historical Monument of Peru. Likewise, in 1983, being part of the historic center of Cuzco, it is part of the central area declared by UNESCO as a World Heritage Site.

== See also ==
- National University of San Marcos, the oldest university of Peru
