= Paqarin Pawka =

Mountain in Peru

- Location within Peru

Highest point
- Elevation: 5,200 m (17,100 ft)
- Coordinates: 12°07′46″S 75°58′01″W

Geography
- Location: Peru, Lima Region
- Parent range: Andes, Cordillera Central

Paqarin Pawka (Quechua paqarin dawn, morning, pawka a plant (Escallonia herrerae), Hispanicized spelling Pajarinpauca) is a mountain in the Cordillera Central in the Andes of Peru, about 5,200 m (17,060 ft) high. It is located in the Lima Region, Yauyos Province, on the border of the districts of Miraflores and Tanta. Paqarin Pawka lies on a ridge northwest of Hatun Pawka and east of a lake named Ch'uspiqucha.
