= Ticllacocha =

Lake in Peru

- Location within Peru
- Location: Lima Region
- Coordinates: 12°14′S 76°01′W
- Basin countries: Peru
- Surface elevation: 4,475 metres (14,682 ft)

Ticllacocha (possibly from Quechua tiklla two-colored / eyelash, qucha lake, lagoon,) is a lake in Peru located in the Lima Region, Yauyos Province, Tanta District. It is situated at a height of about 4,475 metres (14,682 ft), south of the lakes Paucarcocha, Chuspicocha and Piscococha and northwest of the mountains Ticlla and Huayna Cotoni.

== See also ==
- Nor Yauyos-Cochas Landscape Reserve
- List of lakes in Peru
