= Tomas District =

Coordinates: 12.2383°S 75.7460°W

TOMAS _{Santisima Trinidad de Tomas}
- Distrito del Perú
- Interactive map of TOMAS
- Country: Peru
- Region: Lima
- Province: Yauyos
- Founded: October 16, 1933
- Capital: Tomas

Government
  - Mayor: Elmer Avelino Bonilla Castillo

Area
  - Total: 299.27 km^{2} (115.55 sq mi)
- Elevation: 3,540 m (11,610 ft)

Population (2005 census)
  - Total: 596
  - Density: 1.99/km^{2} (5.16/sq mi)
- Time zone: UTC-5 (PET)
- UBIGEO: 151030
- Website: Municipalidad de Tomas

Tomas District is one of thirty-three districts of the Yauyos Province in Peru.

The district of Tomas was official founded on October 16, 1933. Placed just above the Canyon of Uchco and surrounded by three majestic mountains (Tunshupalpa, Uman Huarco and La Libertad) Tomas is one of the highest districts within the province of Yauyos. It is located on the border of the Junin department and is within the boundaries of the Nor Yauyos-Cochas Landscape Reserve (Reserva Paisajistica Nor Yauyos Cochas). The community of Tomas has about 600 alpacas, a herd of 30 vicugnas, among other Andean Camelids.

The community of Tomas provides a hotel, in-home hospitality services, three in-home restaurants, and tourist sites. These sites include Caida de Angel (Angel Falls), the Camino de Ayacoto (Ayacoto trail) a 2 to 3-hour route passing through two sets of pre-Inca ruins the Unidad de Produccion de Alpacas Contadera (Andean Alpaca Farm), and hikes along the Sinwa River with local residents. The community is located at an altitude of approximately 11,500 feet above sea level in rural Peru.

== Geography ==
One of the highest peaks of the district is Wachwa Runtuna at approximately 5,000 m (16,000 ft). Other mountains are listed below:

- Ch'illka Ch'illka
- Hatun Pampa
- K'allapa
- Llant'ayuq Punta
- Muki
- Qarwa Qutu
- Qucha Pata
- Qullqiyuq Punta
- Ranra Punta
- Suraw Punta
- Tunshu Pallpa
- Wayunka Punta
- Wiru Qucha
- Yana Pukyu
- Yuraq Mach'ay

== See also ==
- Qiwllaqucha
- Ñawinpukyu
