= Lake Paucarcocha =

Lake in Peru

- Location within Peru
- Location: Lima Region
- Coordinates: 12°04′53″S 76°00′00″W
- Primary inflows: Cañete River
- Primary outflows: Cañete River
- Catchment area: 213.6 km^{2} (82.5 sq mi)
- Basin countries: Peru
- Surface elevation: 4,284 m (14,055 ft)

Lake Paucarcocha (possibly from Quechua pawqar multi-coloured, qucha lake, lagoon, "multi-coloured lake") is a lake in Peru located in the Lima Region, Yauyos Province, Tanta District. It is situated at a height of about 4,284 metres (14,055 ft), about 6.5 km long and 0.87 km at its widest point. It has a catchment area of 213.6 km^{2}. Lake Paucarcocha lies south of the Pariacaca mountain range, between P'itiqucha in the northwest and Piscococha and Chuspicocha in the southeast. Moreover, the lake is located inside the valley of the Cañete River, being this river its primary inflow and outflow source.

The archaeological site of Pirca Pirca is situated north of the lake.

== See also ==
- Cuchi Machay
- List of lakes in Peru
- Nor Yauyos-Cochas Landscape Reserve
