= Chuspicocha (Yauyos) =

Lake in Lima, Peru

- Location within Peru Location within South America
- Location: Lima Region
- Coordinates: 12°08′01″S 75°58′52″W
- Basin countries: Peru
- Max. length: 2.7 km (1.7 mi)
- Max. width: 1.35 km (0.84 mi)
- Surface elevation: 4,491 m (14,734 ft)

Chuspicocha (possibly from Quechua ch'uspi insect, generic name of flies or two-winged insects; fly, qucha lake, "fly lake" or "insect lake") is a lake in Peru located in the Lima Region, Yauyos Province, Tanta District. It is situated at a height of about 4,625 metres (15,174 ft), about 1.02 km long and 0.4 km at its widest point. Chuspicocha lies south of the Pariacaca mountain range and Paucarcocha and north of Ticllacocha and Piscococha, near the village of Tanta.

== See also ==
- Nor Yauyos-Cochas Landscape Reserve
- List of lakes in Peru
