= Piscococha =

Lake in Moquegua, Peru

- Location within Peru
- Location: Lima Region
- Coordinates: 12°10′30″S 75°58′10″W
- Basin countries: Peru
- Surface elevation: 4,484 metres (14,711 ft)

Piscococha (possibly from Quechua pisqu bird, qucha lake, lagoon, "bird lake") is a lake in Peru located in the Lima Region, Yauyos Province, Tanta District. Piscococha is situated at a height of about 4,484 metres (14,711 ft), south of the lakes Paucarcocha and Chuspicocha and northeast of the lake Ticllacocha.

== See also ==
- Nor Yauyos-Cochas Landscape Reserve
- List of lakes in Peru
