= Cordillera Central (Peru) =

Part of the Andes in Peru

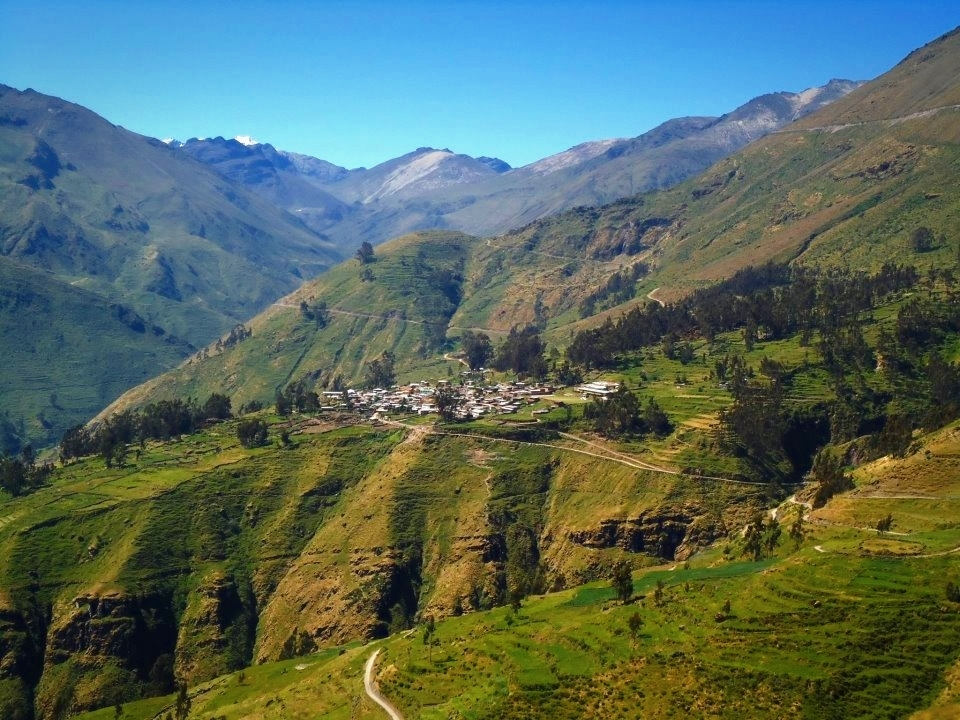
- Snow-covered mountains of the Cordillera Central northeast of Ayaviri

Highest point
- Peak: Qutuni
- Elevation: 5,897 m (19,347 ft)

Dimensions
- Length: 60 km (37 mi) N–S

Geography
- Location within Peru
- Country: Peru
- Region(s): Junín Region, Lima Region
- Range coordinates: 12°15′23″S 75°57′24″W
- Parent range: Andes

The Cordillera Central (Spanish for central mountain range) is part of the Andes in Peru. It extends in a northerly direction approximately between 11º 39’ and 12º 37’S and 75º 30’ and 76º 20’W (or between 11°37' and 12°26'S and 75°30' and 76°18'W) for about 60 km to 100 km. It contains the Paryaqaqa (P), Yauyos (Y) and Pichqa Waqra (PW) mountain ranges. It is located in the Junín Region and in the Lima Region.

The name Cordillera Central is also applied to one of the three ranges that cross Peru in a northwesterly direction between the Cordillera Occidental ("the western range") where the Cordillera Central of the Junín and Lima Regions is located and the Cordillera Oriental ("the eastern range"). The mountaineer Evelio Echevarría uses the term for the La Viuda range and the Khaskaqucha range.

== Mountains ==
The highest mountain in the range is Qutuni at 5,897 m (19,347 ft) (or 5,817 m (19,085 ft)) in the Pichqa Waqra range. Other mountains are listed below:

- Llunk'uti, 5,780 m (18,960 ft) (Y)
- Tunshu, 5,660 m (18,570 ft) (P)
- Qullqi P'ukru, 5,658 m (18,563 ft) (P)
- Qarwachuku, 5,507 m (18,068 ft) (P)
- Paka, 5,500 metres (18,045 ft) (P)
- Suyruqucha, 5,500 m (18,000 ft) (P)
- Wallakancha, 5,500 m (18,000 ft) (P)
- Wayna Qutuni, 5,463 m (17,923 ft) (PW)
- Aqupallqa, 5,445 m (17,864 ft) (Y)
- Uman, 5,431 m (17,818 ft) (Y)
- Hatun Pawka, 5,420 m (17,780 ft) (Y)
- Antashayri, 5,400 m (17,700 ft) (P)
- Nina Ukru, 5,400 m (17,700 ft) (P)
- Pachanqutu, 5,400 m (17,700 ft) (P)
- Paqcha, 5,400 m (17,700 ft) (P)
- Tanraniyuq, 5,400 m (17,700 ft)
- T'uruyuq, 5,400 m (17,700 ft)
- Wayllakancha, 5,400 m (17,700 ft) (P)
- Kunkus Yantaq, 5,354 m (17,566 ft) (P)
- Wararayuq, 5,354 m (17,566 ft) (P)
- Tuku Mach'ay, 5,350 m (17,550 ft) (P)
- Altarniyuq, 5,346 m (17,539 ft) (Y)
- Yana Yana, 5,303 m (17,398 ft)
- Qayqu 5,300 metres (17,388 ft) (P)
- Tata Qayqu, 5,300 metres (17,388 ft) (P)
- Putka, 5,300 m (17,400 ft) (P)
- Upyanqa, 5,300 m (17,400 ft)
- Waqaypaka, 5,300 metres (17,388 ft)
- Wayrakancha, 5,300 metres (17,388 ft)
- Yantayuq, 5,300 m (17,400 ft) (P)
- Wankarqucha, 5,271 m (17,293 ft)
- Uqhu, 5,262 m (17,264 ft)
- Suyruqucha, 5,252 m (17,231 ft)
- Chumpi, 5,250 m (17,220 ft) (P)
- Yawriq, 5,235 m (17,175 ft)
- Utush Mikhunan, 5,228 m (17,152 ft)
- Chaka Punta, 5,200 m (17,100 ft)
- Ch'uspi, 5,200 m (17,100 ft) (P)
- Paqarin Pawka, 5,200 m (17,100 ft) (Y)
- Puma Ranra, 5,200 m (17,100 ft)
- Quri, 5,200 m (17,100 ft)
- Quriwasi, 5,200 m (17,100 ft) (P)
- Uqhu, 5,200 m (17,100 ft) (P)
- Ukhu Qhata, 5,200 m (17,100 ft) (P)
- Wiqu, 5,200 m (17,100 ft) (P)
- Runchu, 5,165 m (16,946 ft) (Y)
- Chuqi Chukchu, 5,154 m (16,909 ft)
- Wamanripa, 5,110 m (16,770 ft) (P)
- Kiwyu Waqanan, 5,100 m (16,700 ft) (P)
- Putka, 5,100 m (16,700 ft)
- Qayqu, 5,100 m (16,700 ft) (P)
- Qullqayuq, 5,100 m (16,700 ft)
- T'uru, 5,100 m (16,700 ft)
- Siq'i, 5,075 m (16,650 ft)
- Awki Sunqu, 5,050 m (16,570 ft)
- Anta P'unqu, 5,000 m (16,000 ft)
- Chhuqu P'ukru, 5,000 m (16,000 ft)
- Hatun Punta, 5,000 m (16,000 ft)
- Kancha Q'asa, 5,000 m (16,000 ft)
- Kiwyu, 5,000 m (16,000 ft)
- Kunkus, 5,000 metres (16,404 ft) (P)
- Kunkus (Yauli), 5,000 metres (16,404 ft) (P)
- K'isi Kancha, 5,000 metres (16,404 ft)
- Mulli, 5,000 m (16,000 ft)
- Paquchi, 5,000 m (16,000 ft)
- Paraqti, 5,000 m (16,000 ft)
- Parya Chaka, 5,000 m (16,000 ft) (P)
- Quñuq P'ukru, 5,000 metres (16,404 ft)
- Ruphasqa, 5,000 m (16,000 ft)
- Suyuq, 5,000 m (16,000 ft) (P)
- Turiyuq, 5,000 m (16,000 ft) (P)
- Uqi Uqi, 5,000 m (16,000 ft)
- Uqsha Wallqa, 5,000 m (16,000 ft) (P)
- Wachwa Runtuna, 5,000 m (16,000 ft)
- Wamanripa (Lima), 5,000 m (16,000 ft)
- Wamanripa (Junín), 5,000 m (16,000 ft)
- Wampuru, 5,000 m (16,000 ft)
- Wamp'una, 5,000 m (16,000 ft)
- Wayu Marka, 5,000 m (16,000 ft)
- Winsu, 5,000 m (16,000 ft)
- Yana Punta, 5,000 m (16,000 ft)
- Qaqa Ranra, 4,900 m (16,100 ft)
- Anta P'unqu, 4,800 m (15,700 ft)
- Chili Punta, 4,800 m (15,700 ft)
- Hatun Ukru, 4,800 m (15,700 ft)
- Kaywa, 4,800 m (15,700 ft)
- Kuntur Wachanan, 4,800 m (15,700 ft)
- Kuntur Waqta, 4,800 m (15,700 ft)
- Llamayuq, 4,800 m (15,700 ft)
- Marayniyuq, 4,800 m (15,700 ft)
- Muki, 4,800 m (15,700 ft) (Huancaya-Tomas)
- Muki, 4,800 m (15,700 ft) (Tanta)
- Pinkuyllu, 4,800 m (15,700 ft)
- Puka Puka, 4,800 m (15,700 ft)
- Pukyu Rumi, 4,800 m (15,700 ft)
- Puma Rawkha, 4,800 m (15,700 ft)
- P'allqa, 4,800 m (15,700 ft)
- Rukutu, 4,800 m (15,700 ft)
- Sapallan Warmi, 4,800 m (15,700 ft)
- Saqsa, 4,800 m (15,700 ft)
- Uchku, 4,800 m (15,700 ft)
- Ukru Ukru, 4,800 m (15,700 ft)
- Uqsha, 4,800 m (15,700 ft)
- Wachwa Runtu, 4,800 m (15,700 ft)
- Wallapi, 4,800 m (15,700 ft) (P)
- Wanin, 4,800 m (15,700 ft)
- Wiñaq, 4,800 m (15,700 ft)
- Yana P'unqu, 4,800 m (15,700 ft)
- Yana Uqsha, 4,800 m (15,700 ft)
- Yana Urqu (Alis-Laraos), 4,800 m (15,700 ft)
- Yana Urqu (Laraos), 4,800 m (15,700 ft)
- Yanta Pallana, 4,800 m (15,700 ft)
- Atuq Sayk'u, 4,600 m (15,100 ft)
- Chakraqucha, 4,600 m (15,100 ft)
- Ch'uychu, 4,600 m (15,100 ft)
- Kachi Raqra, 4,600 m (15,100 ft)
- Kawituyuq, 4,600 m (15,100 ft)
- Kima Rumi, 4,600 m (15,100 ft)
- Kuntur Tiyana, 4,600 m (15,100 ft)
- Muchka, 4,600 m (15,100 ft)
- Pukap Siqin, 4,600 m (15,100 ft)
- Qullqiyuq Punta, 4,600 m (15,100 ft)
- Rinriyuq, 4,600 m (15,100 ft)
- Sankha Ukru, 4,600 m (15,100 ft)
- Tuqtu, 4,600 m (15,100 ft)
- Wamanripa, 4,600 m (15,100 ft)
- Waylla Waqran, 4,600 m (15,100 ft)
- Yuraq Kancha, 4,600 m (15,100 ft)
- Yuraq Ñan, 4,600 m (15,100 ft)
- Challwayuq, 4,400 m (14,400 ft)
- Qiwllaqucha, 4,400 m (14,400 ft)
- Waqraqucha, 4,400 m (14,400 ft)
- Muntirayuq, 4,200 m (13,800 ft)
- Kuntur Sinqa, 4,000 m (13,000 ft)
