= Huayna Cotoni =

Mountain in Peru

- Location within Peru

Highest point
- Elevation: 5,463 m (17,923 ft)
- Coordinates: 12°16′02″S 75°59′04″W

Geography
- Location: Peru, Lima Region
- Parent range: Andes, Cordillera Central, Pichqa Waqra

Huayna Cotoni or Wayna Qutuni(Aymara wayna young (man), bachelor, qutu heap, pile, -ni a suffix to indicate ownership ("the one with a heap"), Qutuni a neighboring mountain, "young Qutuni", Hispanicized spellings Huayna Cotoni, Huaynacotoni, Huaynacutuni) is a mountain in the Cordillera Central in the Andes of Peru, about 5,463 metres (17,923 ft) high. It is located in the Lima Region, Yauyos Province, on the border of the districts of Ayaviri, Quinches and Tanta. Huayna Cotoni is in a sub-range of the Cordillera Central named Pichqa Waqra (Quechua for "five horns", also spelled Pichcahuajra) on the southern border of the Nor Yauyos-Cochas Landscape Reserve. It lies between the lakes named Tikllaqucha in the north and Huayna Cotoni in the south, southwest of the peak of Qutuni and south of Aqupallqa.

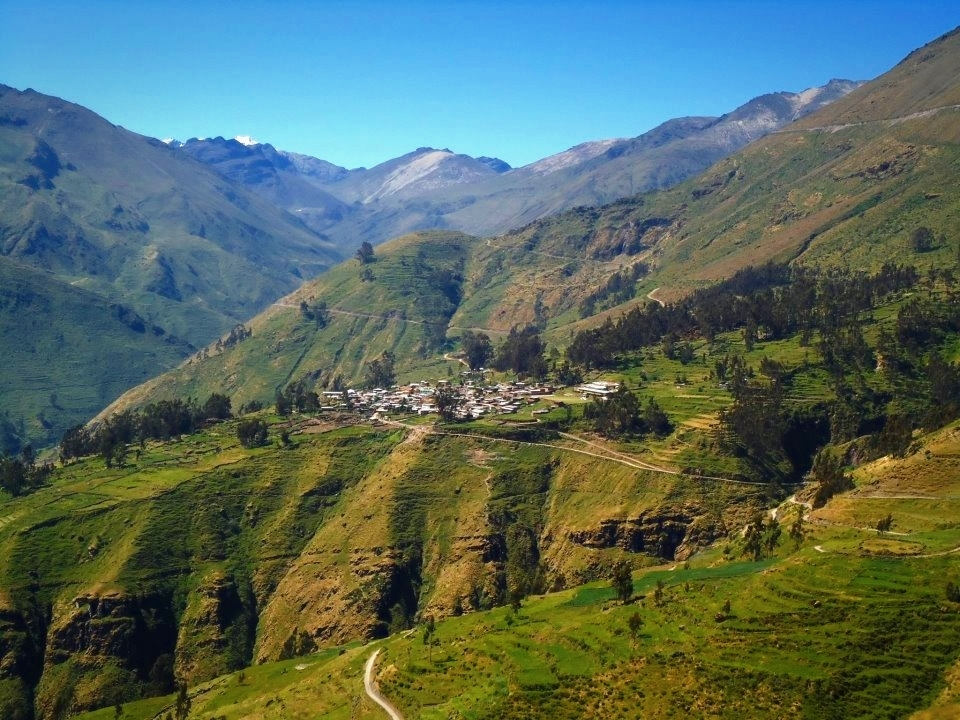
Snow-covered mountains northeast of Ayaviri where Huayna Cotoni and Qutuni (behind it) are situated
