= Suyruqucha (Junín-Lima) =

Mountain in the Andes of Peru

- Location within Peru

Highest point
- Elevation: 5,500 m (18,000 ft)
- Coordinates: 11°56′20″S 76°03′07″W

Geography
- Location: Peru, Lima Region, Junín Region
- Parent range: Andes, Paryaqaqa mountain range

Suyruqucha (Quechua suyru a very long dress tracked after when worn, qucha lake, also spelled Suiricocha) is a mountain in the Paryaqaqa or Waruchiri mountain range in the Andes of Peru, about 5,500 metres (18,045 ft) high. It is located in the Junín Region, Jauja Province, Canchayllo District, in the Yauli Province, Suitucancha District, and in the Lima Region, Huarochiri Province, Quinti District. It lies on the western border of the Nor Yauyos-Cochas Landscape Reserve. It is situated northwest of Qullqip'ukru. Wararayuq lies west of it.

Suyruqucha (Suiricocha) is also the name of a lake west of the mountain at 11°57′08″S 76°04′14″W and the name of a place at the lake (Suiricocha / Suirococha).
