= Uqsha =

Mountain in Peru

- Location within Peru

Highest point
- Elevation: 4,800 m (15,700 ft)
- Coordinates: 12°05′18″S 76°03′42″W

Geography
- Location: Peru, Lima Region
- Parent range: Andes, Cordillera Central

Uqsha (local Quechua for a high altitude grass (uqsa), also spelled Ocsha) is a mountain in the Cordillera Central in the Andes of Peru, about 4,800 m (15,748 ft) high. It is located in the Lima Region, Huarochirí Province, Quinti District, and in the Yauyos Province, Tanta District, southwest of the lake named P'itiqucha. Uqsha lies northeast of Waswa Punta and southeast of Hatun Ukru. It is situated on the western border of the Nor Yauyos-Cochas Landscape Reserve.
