= Tunshu =

Mountain in Peru

- Location within Peru

Highest point
- Elevation: 5,660 m (18,570 ft)
- Coordinates: 11°53′35″S 75°59′01″W

Geography
- Location: Peru, Junín Region
- Parent range: Andes, Paryaqaqa

Tunshu is a 5,660-metre-high (18,570 ft) mountain in the Pariacaca mountain range in the Andes of Peru. It is located in the Junín Region, Jauja Province, Canchayllo District and in the Yauli Province, Suitucancha District. Tunshu lies north of Pariacaca and northwest of Tukumach'ay and the lake named Qarwaqucha. It is situated on the northern border of the Nor Yauyos-Cochas Landscape Reserve.
