= Canchayllo District =

Coordinates: 11.8030°S 75.7171°W

Canchayllo
- District
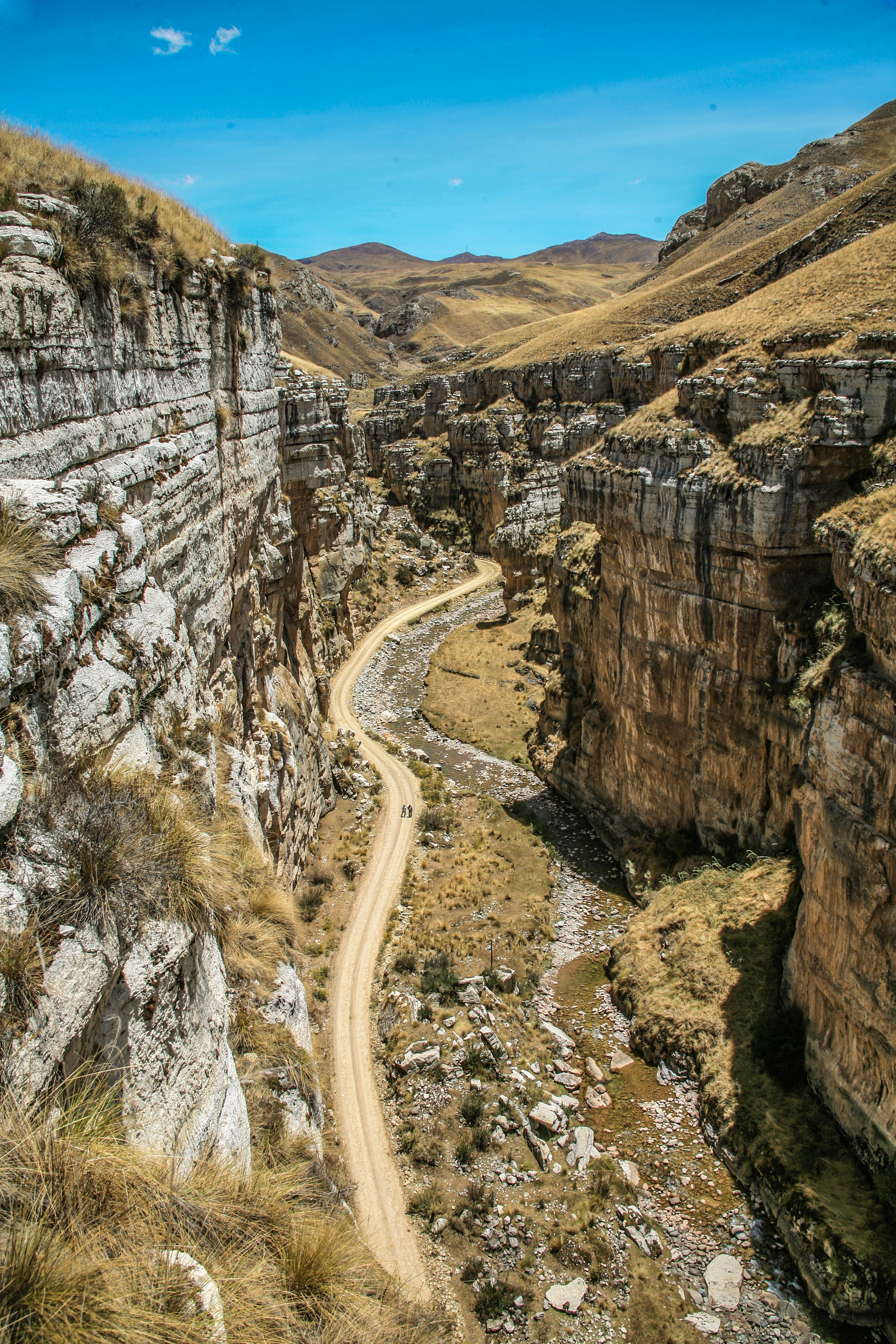
- A canyon in the Nor Yauyos-Cochas Landscape Reserve in Canchayllo District
- Interactive map of Canchayllo
- Country: Peru
- Region: Junín
- Province: Jauja
- Founded: October 15, 1954
- Capital: Canchayllo

Government
  - Mayor: Raul Ricardo Zavala Rojas

Area
  - Total: 974.69 km^{2} (376.33 sq mi)
- Elevation: 3,609 m (11,841 ft)

Population (2005 census)
  - Total: 2,304
  - Density: 2.364/km^{2} (6.122/sq mi)
- Time zone: UTC-5 (PET)
- UBIGEO: 120405

Canchayllo District is one of thirty-four districts of the Jauja Province in Peru. Its seat is Canchayllo.

== Geography ==
The district lies in the Nor Yauyos-Cochas Landscape Reserve. The Paryaqaqa mountain range traverses the district. The highest mountain of the district is Paryaqaqa (Tulluqutu) at 5,750 metres (18,865 ft). Other mountains are listed below:

- Ankapa Wachanan
- Anta Qucha
- Aqu Ranra
- Challwa Qucha
- Ch'uychu
- Kima Rumi
- Khuchi Pata
- K'ulluq
- Marayniyuq
- Marka Wat'a
- Mayu Kancha
- Muntiruyuq
- Muyu Pampa
- Pampa Marka
- Pawkara
- Puywan
- Qiwllaqucha
- Qullqa Tampu
- Qullqi P'ukru
- Qura Kancha
- Quriwasi
- Qutu Puyku
- Surawniyuq
- Suyruqucha
- Tuku Mach'ay
- Tunshu
- Ushpa Punta
- Winchus
- Wiraqucha
- Wira Qullpa
- Wiskas
- Yana Urqu
- Yuraq Kancha
- Yuraqqucha

Some of the largest lakes of the province are Antaqucha, Asulqucha, Challwaqucha, Llaksaqucha, Mankhaqucha, Qarwaqucha, Ñawinqucha, Warmiqucha, Wich'iqucha and Yuraqqucha.

== See also ==
- Quri Winchus
