= Wiraqucha (Junín) =

Mountain in Peru

- Location within Peru

Highest point
- Elevation: 4,600 m (15,100 ft)
- Coordinates: 12°01′43″S 75°43′13″W

Geography
- Location: Peru, Junín Region
- Parent range: Andes

Cerro Huiracocha or Wiraqucha (see Viracocha#Etymology for etymology) is a mountain in the Andes of Peru, about 4,600 metres (15,092 ft) high. It is located in the Junín Region, Jauja Province, Canchayllo District. Wiraqucha lies east of the lakes named Llaksaqucha, Mankhaqucha and Chakip'aki (Chaquipaque), south of Challwaqucha and north of the mountain named Chakip'aki. It is situated on the eastern border of the Nor Yauyos-Cochas Landscape Reserve.
