= Ch'uspiqucha (Huarochirí) =

Lake in Peru

- Location within Peru
- Location: Lima Region
- Coordinates: 11°59′58″S 76°00′55″W
- Basin countries: Peru
- Max. length: 1.02 km (0.63 mi)
- Max. width: 0.4 km (0.25 mi)
- Surface elevation: 4,625 m (15,174 ft)

Ch'uspiqucha (Quechua ch'uspi insect, generic name of flies or two-winged insects / fly, qucha lake, lagoon, "fly lake" or "insect lake", hispanicized spelling Chuspicocha) is a lake in Peru located in the Lima Region, Huarochirí Province, Quinti District. It is situated at a height of about 4,625 metres (15,174 ft), about 1.02 km long and 0.4 km at its widest point. Ch'uspiqucha lies south of the mountain Qullqip'ukru of the Paryaqaqa mountain range and north of the lakes named P'itiqucha, Parya Chaka and Ch'uspi.

== See also ==
- Nor Yauyos-Cochas Landscape Reserve
- List of lakes in Peru
