= Nina Ukru =

Mountain in Peru

- Location within Peru

Highest point
- Elevation: 5,400 m (17,700 ft)
- Coordinates: 11°59′24″S 76°01′39″W

Geography
- Location: Peru, Lima Region
- Parent range: Andes, Paryaqaqa

Nina Ukru (Quechua nina fire, ukru hole, pit, hollow, "fire hollow", Hispanicized spelling Ninaucro) is a mountain in the Paryaqaqa or Waruchiri mountain range in the Andes of Peru, about 5,400 metres (17,717 ft) high. It is situated in the Lima Region, Huarochirí Province, Quinti District. Nina Ukru lies southwest of Qullqip'ukru and west of Paryaqaqa.
