= Lake Azulcocha =

- Location within Peru
- Location: Junín Region, Jauja Province
- Coordinates: 11°56′20″S 76°00′14″W
- Basin countries: Peru

Azulcocha Dam
- Location within Peru
- Country: Peru

Dam and spillways
- Height: 8.5 m (28 ft)

Power Station
- Operator: Electroperu

Lake Azulcocha (possibly from Spanish azul, blue; and Quechua qucha, lake) is a lake in the Pariacaca mountain range in the Andes of Peru. It is located in the Junín Region, Jauja Province, Canchayllo District. It lies northwest of Pariacaca, the highest mountain of the range. The lake belongs to the watershed of the Mantaro River.

In 1997 the Azulcocha dam was erected at the southeastern end of the lake at 11°56′41.23″S 75°59′45.31″W. The dam is 8.5 m (28 ft) high. It is operated by Electroperu.

== See also ==
- List of lakes in Peru
