= San Lorenzo de Quinti District =

Coordinates: 12.1472°S 76.2104°W

San Lorenzo de Quinti Q'inti
- District
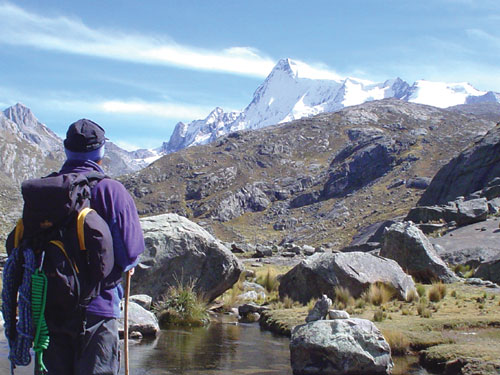
- Paryaqaqa
- Interactive map of San Lorenzo de Quinti
- Country: Peru
- Region: Lima
- Province: Huarochirí
- Capital: San Lorenzo de Quinti

Government
  - Mayor: Justo David Traslaviña Davila

Area
  - Total: 467.58 km^{2} (180.53 sq mi)
- Elevation: 2,680 m (8,790 ft)

Population (2005 census)
  - Total: 1,631
  - Density: 3.488/km^{2} (9.034/sq mi)
- Time zone: UTC-5 (PET)
- UBIGEO: 150721

San Lorenzo de Quinti District is one of thirty-two districts of the province Huarochirí in Peru.

== Geography ==
The Paryaqaqa or Waruchiri mountain range is the north-eastern border of the district. One of the highest peaks of the district is Paryaqaqa at 5,750 metres (18,865 ft) above sea level. Other mountains are listed below:

- Chakraqucha
- Chumpi
- Ch'uspi
- Hatun Ukru
- Mankhan
- Nina Ukru
- Paqcha
- Parqu
- Parya Chaka
- Paryaqaqa
- Qaqa Ranra
- Qayqu
- Qullqip'ukru
- Quriwasi
- Suyruqucha
- Suyuq
- Turiyuq
- Uqsha
- Uqsha Wallqa
- Wallapi
- Wararayuq
- Waswa Punta
- Wiqu
- Yanaqucha

== See also ==
- Ch'uspiqucha
- P'itiqucha
