= Uqsha Wallqa =

Mountain in Peru

- Location within Peru

Highest point
- Elevation: 5,000 m (16,000 ft)
- Coordinates: 11°55′03″S 76°06′02″W

Geography
- Location: Peru, Lima Region
- Parent range: Andes, Paryaqaqa

Uqsha Wallqa (Quechua uqsha a high altitude grass, wallqa collar, hispanicized spelling Ocsahualca) is a mountain in the Paryaqaqa mountain range in the Andes of Peru, about 5,000 metres (16,404 ft) high. It is situated in the Lima Region, Huarochirí Province, on the border of the districts of San Mateo and Quinti. It lies northwest of Paqcha and Wararayuq and southeast of Wamanripa.
