= Wiqu (Lima) =

Mountain in Peru

- Location within Peru

Highest point
- Elevation: 5,200 m (17,100 ft)
- Coordinates: 12°01′07″S 75°59′53″W

Geography
- Location: Peru, Lima Region
- Parent range: Andes

Wiqu (Quechua twisted, bent, crooked, also spelled Hueco) is a mountain in the Paryaqaqa or Waruchiri mountain range in the Andes of Peru, about 5,200 m (17,060 ft) high. It is located in the Lima Region, Huarochirí Province, Quinti District, and in the Yauyos Province, Tanta District. Wiqu lies southwest of Paryaqaqa and northeast of Parya Chaka.
