= Wamp'una =

Mountain in Peru

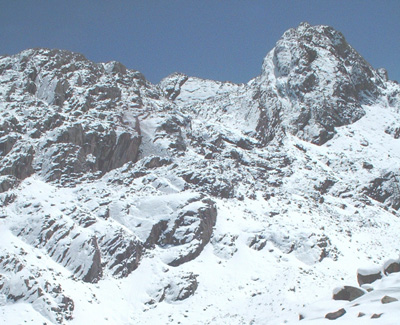
- Wamp'una with entrance to Qaqa Mach'ay at left centre

Highest point
- Elevation: 5,000 m (16,000 ft)
- Coordinates: 12°26′02″S 75°40′03″W

Geography
- Location within Peru
- Location: Peru, Lima Region
- Parent range: Andes, Cordillera Central

Wamp'una (Quechua wamp'u boat, -na a suffix, also spelled Huampuna) is a mountain in the Cordillera Central in the Andes of Peru, about 5,000 metres (16,404 ft) high. It contains one of the highest surveyed caves in the word, Qaqa Mach'ay. Wamp'una is located in the Lima Region, Yauyos Province, on the border of the districts of Huantán and Laraos. It lies southwest of T'uruyuq, southeast of the lake named Pumaqucha. It is situated on the southern border of the Nor Yauyos-Cochas Landscape Reserve.

== See also ==
- Pumaqucha
- Sima Pumaqucha
