= Parya Chaka =

Mountain in Peru

- Location within Peru

Highest point
- Elevation: 5,000 m (16,000 ft)
- Coordinates: 12°01′38″S 76°00′38″W

Geography
- Location: Peru, Lima Region
- Parent range: Andes, Paryaqaqa

Parya Chaka (Quechua parya reddish, copper or sparrow, chaka bridge, "reddish (copper or sparrow) bridge", Hispanicized spelling Pariachaca) is a mountain in the south of the Paryaqaqa or Waruchiri mountain range in the Andes of Peru, about 5,000 m (16,404 ft) high. It is also the name of a lake near the mountain. The mountain is located in the Lima Region, Huarochirí Province, Quinti District, and in the Yauyos Province, Tanta District. It is situated southwest of Paryaqaqa. It is situated within the borders of the Nor Yauyos-Cochas Landscape Reserve.

The lake named Parya Chaka is west of the mountain at 12°01′49″S 76°01′34″W. It lies in a row between Ch'uspiqucha in the northeast and P'itiqucha in the southwest.
