= Tuqtu =

Tuqtu (Quechua for "broody hen", also spelled Tucto, Tuctu) may refer to:

- Tuqtu (Ancash), a mountain in the Ancash Region, Peru
- Tuqtu (Canas-Chumbivilcas), a mountain on the border of the provinces of Canas and Chumbivilcas, Cusco Region, Peru
- Tuqtu (Canchis-Quispicanchi), a mountain on the border of the provinces of Canchis and Quispicanchi, Cusco Region, Peru
- Tuqtu (Junín), a mountain in the Junín Region, Peru
