= SP3 =

SP3 may refer to:

- sp^{3} hybrids, a type of orbital hybridisation
- Sp3 transcription factor, a protein and the gene which encodes it
- Savoia-Pomilio SP.3, a reconnaissance and bomber aircraft built in Italy
- USS Zipalong (SP-3), an armed motorboat
- 1971 SP3 or 3922 Heather, a main-belt asteroid discovered on September 26, 1971
- 1984 SP3 or 3155 Lee, a main-belt asteroid discovered on September 28, 1984
- SP3, a model of steam toy made by British manufacturer Mamod
- Service pack 3, for computer software
- Socket SP3, a CPU socket for AMD processors
- SP3, a sink in the Sima Pumacocha, a cave in Peru
- Surface Pro 3, a 2-in-1 personal computer by Microsoft
