= Ñawinqucha (Jauja) =

- Location within Peru
- Location: Peru; Junín Region, Jauja Province
- Coordinates: 11°52′03″S 75°53′04″W

Ñawinqucha Dam
- Location within Peru
- Country: Peru

Dam and spillways
- Height: 4 m (13 ft)

Power Station
- Operator: Electroperu

Ñawinqucha (Quechua ñawi button hole / eye, -n a suffix, qucha lake, hispanicized spelling Nahuincocha) is a lake in Peru located in the Junín Region, Jauja Province, Canchayllo District, northeast of the Paryaqaqa mountain range. The lake belongs to the watershed of the Mantaro River.

In 1995 the 4 m (13 ft) high Ñawinqucha dam was erected at the eastern end of the lake at 11°52′02″S 75°52′46″W. The dam is operated by Electroperu.
