= Laraos District =

Laraos Laraw
- District
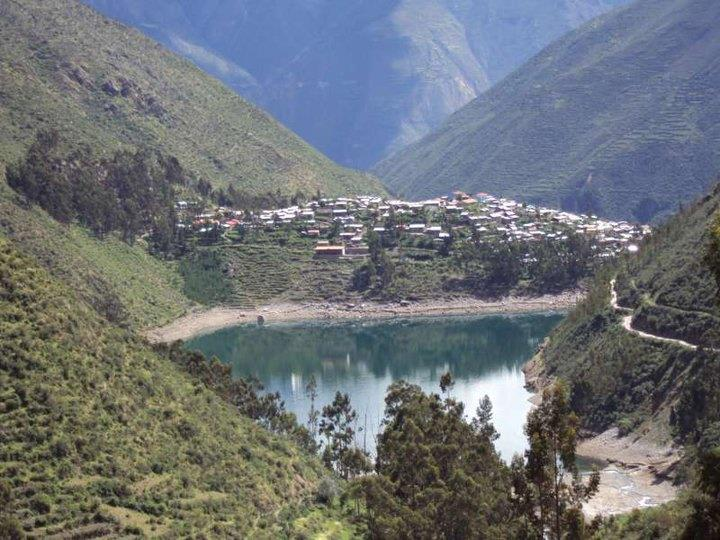
- View of the town of Laraos
- Interactive map of Laraos
- Coordinates: 12.3468°S 75.7856°W
- Country: Peru
- Region: Lima
- Province: Yauyos
- Capital: Laraos

Government
  - Mayor: Albin Laureano Brañez Huallullo

Area
  - Total: 403.76 km^{2} (155.89 sq mi)
- Elevation: 3,563 m (11,690 ft)

Population (2017)
  - Total: 546
  - Density: 1.35/km^{2} (3.50/sq mi)
- Time zone: UTC-5 (PET)
- UBIGEO: 151018

Laraos District is one of thirty-three districts of the province Yauyos in the Lima Region in Peru.

Elderly people in Laraos still speak an archaic Quechua dialect. As no more children speak the language, it is in imminent danger of extinction.

== History ==
The Laraos District is one of oldest of the Yauyos Province, and its history is ample and emerges from the pre-incan times. Its preceding town is Sinchimarka, cradle of forgers, but simultaneously brave and militant men, like all the tribes who conformed the Yauyos, who were tenacious resistants before being conquered by the incan leader Pachakutiq. The pre-incan towns of Laraos are: Wanllapata, Waqramarka, Wayawmarka and Callawarqui. Sinchimarka is an incan citadel.

In 1586, being viceroy Don Fernando de Torres of Portugal, the first mayor of Yauyos, Don Diego Dávila Briceño, made the territorial demarcation and formed four parishes or curatos with more than four towns each one, entrusted at the service of the Dominican priests. These were: Santo Domingo de Yauyos, Santo Domingo de Laraos, San Cristóbal de Huánec and Santa Maria de Pampas.

It is to say that with the Spanish conquest, the natives of Sinchimarka were forced to become transferred to the present location of the district. Thus this one acquires the denomination of Santo Domingo de Cocha Laraos, being one of the most important towns and then they contributed in the process of cristanization of the inhabitants of Yauyos.

== Etymology ==
Its name comes from a derivative of the word Jaqi or Jaqaru Larawpukyu (laraw paved street, pukyu spring, "spring in the paved street", Hispanicized Laraupugio). With the Andean transculturization it is transformed into Laraus (plural), so it means paved streets, and with the castellanization it is pronounced Laraos.

== Political division ==
The farming community of Laraos was recognized the 2 of September 1938. Their annexes are San Juan de Langaico and Lanca. Its populated centers are Llapay and Tintin. The town is divided into ten main streets: Callhuapampa, Ansaya, Larpa, Callampa, Súniqui, Cancayllu, Achallanca, Warcaña, Caracara and Chunchillo.

== Geography ==
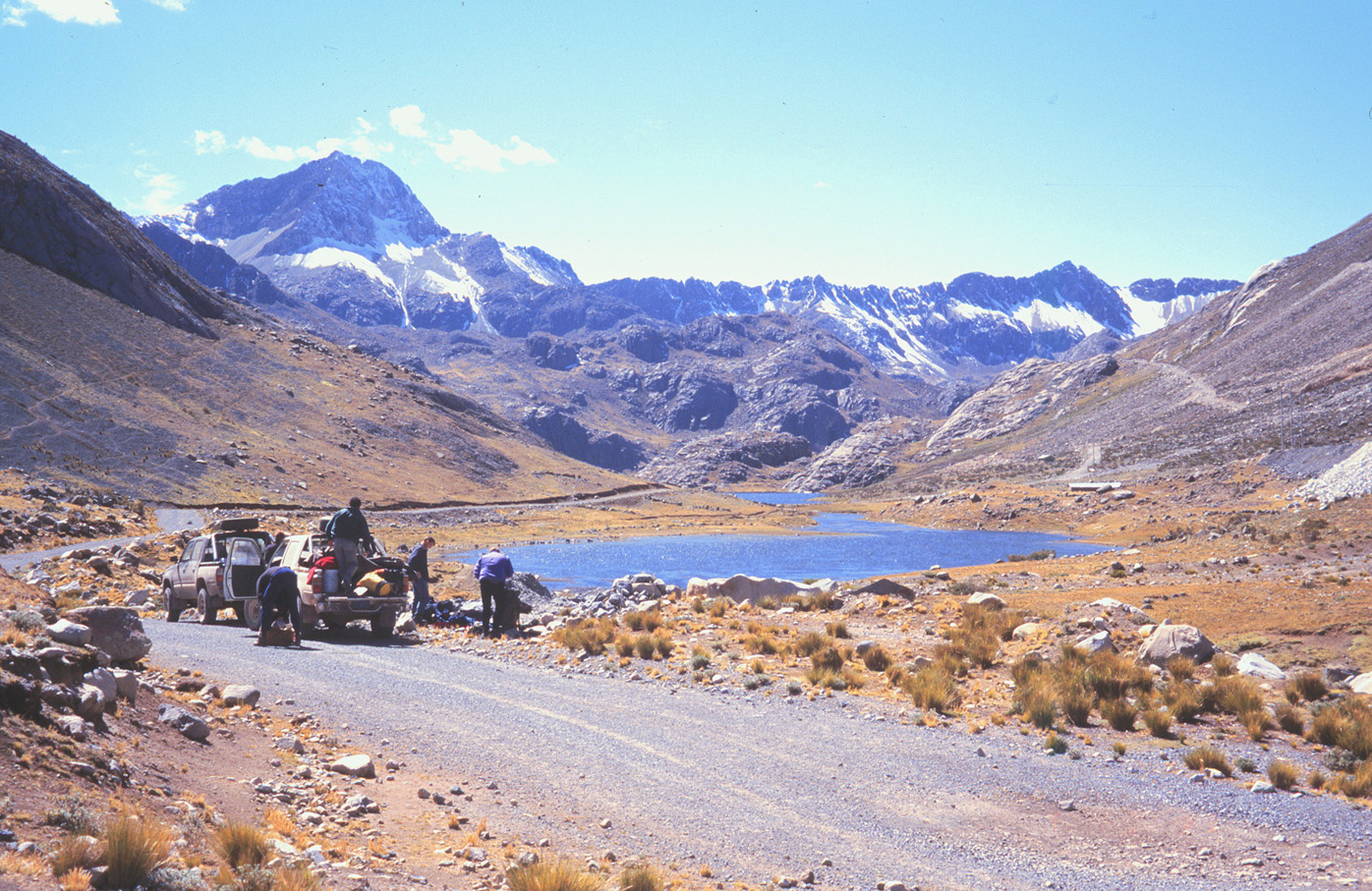
Pumaqucha ("cougar lake") in the Laraos District

The Cordillera Central traverses the district. One of the highest peaks of the district is Tanraniyuq at approximately 5,400 m (17,700 ft). Other mountains are listed below:

- Aqu P'unqu
- Chili Punta
- Hatun Punta
- Kancha Q'asa
- Kuntur Waqta
- Misitu
- Pinkuyllu
- Pukap Siqin
- Puma Ranra
- P'allqa
- Q'umir Pampa
- Sinchi Marka Punta
- Siq'i
- Tanraniyuq
- T'uruyuq
- Uchku
- Uqi Uqi
- Wachwa Runtu
- Wamanripa
- Wamp'una
- Wayu Marka
- Yana Punta
- Yana P'unqu
- Yana Uqsha
- Yana Urqu

== See also ==
- Pumaqucha
- Qaqa Mach'ay
- Quchapampa
- Sima Pumaqucha
