= Lake Cochabamba =

Lake in Lima Region, Peru

Lake Cochapampa
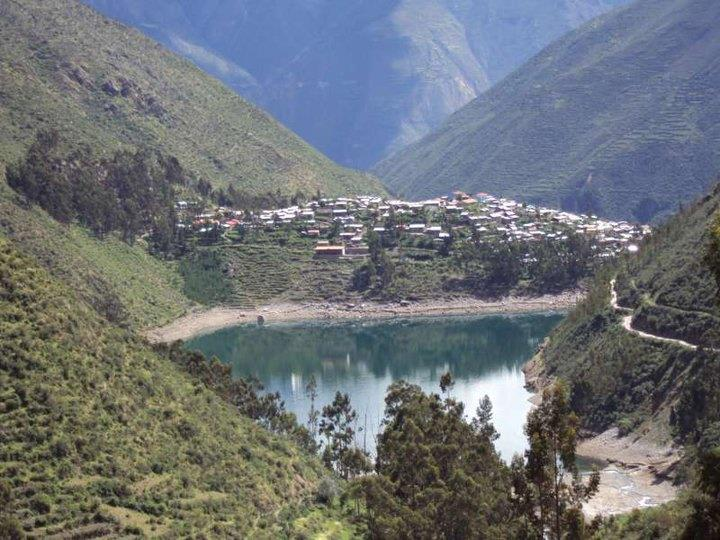
- Lake Cochapampa and the village of Laraos.

- Location within Peru
- Location: Lima Region
- Coordinates: 12°21′2.02″S 75°46′57″W
- Basin countries: Peru
- Surface elevation: 3,373 m (11,066 ft)

Lake Cochapampa (possibly from Quechua qucha lake, pampa a large plain) is a lake in Peru located in the Laraos District, Yauyos Province of Lima Region. It is situated at a height of about 3,373 m (11,066 ft) near Laraos within the Nor Yauyos-Cochas Landscape Reserve.

== See also ==
- List of lakes in Peru
- Lake Pumacocha (Lima)
