= Uchku =

Mountain in Peru

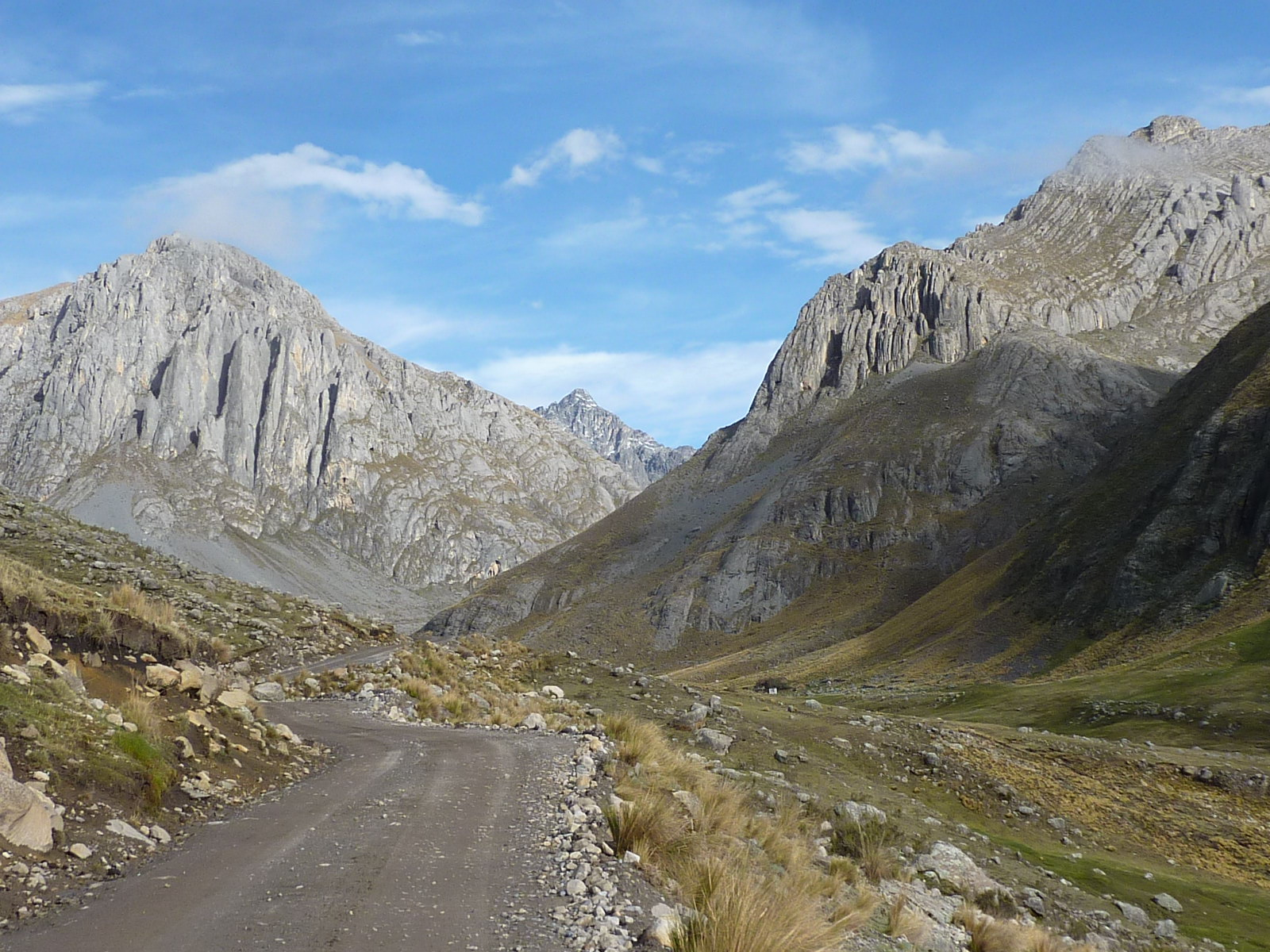
- Uchku (on the left)

Highest point
- Elevation: 4,800 m (15,700 ft)
- Coordinates: 12°23′05″S 75°42′05″W

Geography
- Location within Peru
- Location: Peru, Lima Region
- Parent range: Andes, Cordillera Central

Uchku (Quechua for hole, pit, also spelled Uchco) is mountain in the Cordillera Central in the Andes of Peru which reaches a height of approximately 4,800 metres (15,748 ft) high. It is located in the Lima Region, Yauyos Province, Laraos District. Uchku lies southwest of a lake named Pumaqucha. The entrance to Sima Pumaqucha, one of the deepest caves of South America, is on the southern slope of the mountain.

== Gallery ==
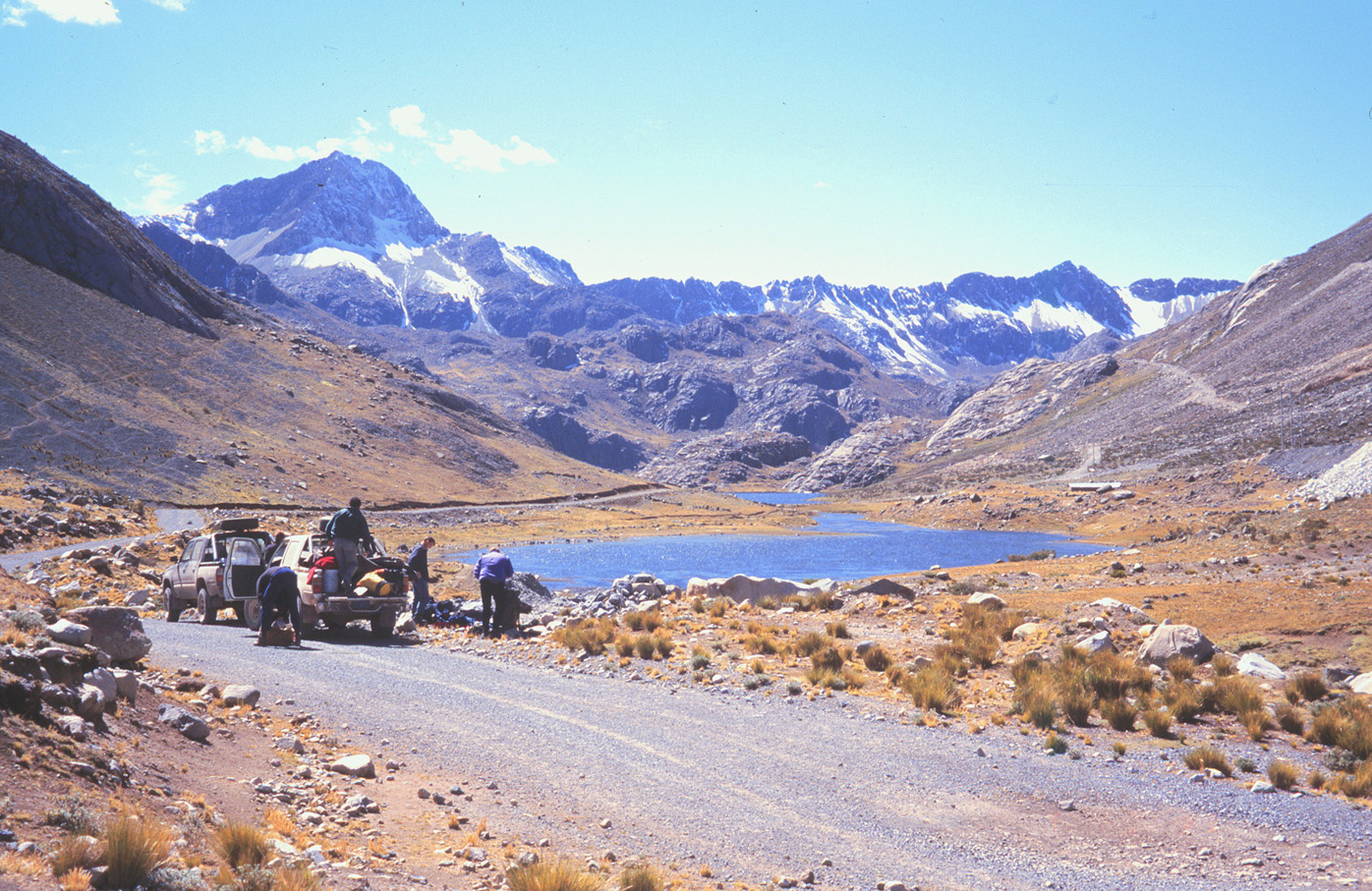
Cavers at Pumaqucha offloading equipment for Sima Pumaqucha. The southern slopes of Uchku are on the left.
