= Ch'uspiqucha =

Ch'uspiqucha (Quechua ch'uspi insect, fly, qucha lake, "insect lake" or "fly lake", Hispanicized spellings and names Chuspi, Chuspiccocha, Chuspicocha) may refer to:

- Ch'uspiqucha (Huánuco), a mountain at a lake of that name in the Huánuco Region, Peru
- Ch'uspiqucha (Huarochirí), a lake in the Huarochirí Province, Lima Region, Peru
- Ch'uspiqucha (Yauyos), a lake in the Yauyos Province, Lima Region, Peru
