= Corihuasi =

Mountain in Peru

- Location within Peru

Highest point
- Elevation: 5,200 m (17,100 ft)
- Coordinates: 11°59′30″S 76°00′40″W

Geography
- Location: Peru, Lima Region, Junín Region
- Parent range: Andes, Pariacaca

Corihuasi (possibly from Quechua quri gold, wasi house, "gold house") is a mountain in the Pariacaca or Huarochiri mountain range in the Andes of Peru, about 5,200 metres (17,060 ft) high. It is located in the Junín Region, Jauja Province, Canchayllo District, and in the Lima Region, Huarochiri Province, Quinti District. Corihuasi lies between the mountains Colquepucro in the north-west and Pariacaca in the south-east. It is situated on the western border of the Nor Yauyos-Cochas Landscape Reserve.

Satellite images from 1998, 2005, 2010, 2011 and 2012 show that the Corihuasi glacier which flows to the northeast has retreated. The glacier lies at 11°58′58″S 76°00′35″W.
