= Parqu =

Mountain in Peru

- Location within Peru

Highest point
- Elevation: 4,800 m (15,700 ft)
- Coordinates: 12°01′40″S 76°05′47″W

Geography
- Location: Peru, Lima Region
- Parent range: Andes

Parqu (Quechua parquy irrigation Hispanicized spelling Parjo) is a mountain west of the Paryaqaqa or Waruchiri mountain range in the Andes of Peru, about 4,800 m (15,748 ft) high. It is situated in the Lima Region, Huarochirí Province, Quinti District. Parqu lies between the Qarwapampa valley in the west and the Mankaqutu valley in the east, west of the lake named Suyuqqucha.
