= Antaqucha =

Antaqucha (Quechua for "copper lake", hispanicized spellings Antaccocha, Antacocha, Antajocha, also Antaqocha) may refer to:

- Antaqucha (Apurímac), a lake in the Apurímac Region, Peru
- Antaqucha (Jauja), a lake in the Jauja Province, Junín Region, Peru
- Antaqucha (Junín), a lake in the Junín District, Junín Province, Junín Region, Peru
- Antaqucha (Lima), a lake in the Lima Region, Peru
