= Qayqu (Lima) =

Mountain in Peru

- Location within Peru

Highest point
- Elevation: 5,100 m (16,700 ft)
- Coordinates: 11°58′46″S 76°04′02″W

Geography
- Location: Peru, Lima Region
- Parent range: Andes, Paryaqaqa

Qayqu (Quechua for a type of hunt, hispanicized spelling Jaico) is a mountain in the Paryaqaqa mountain range in the Andes of Peru, about 5,100 metres (16,732 ft) high. It is situated in the Lima Region, Huarochirí Province, Quinti District. It lies southwest of Qullqi P'ukru.
