= Lake Ñahuimpuquio (Junín) =

Lake in Peru

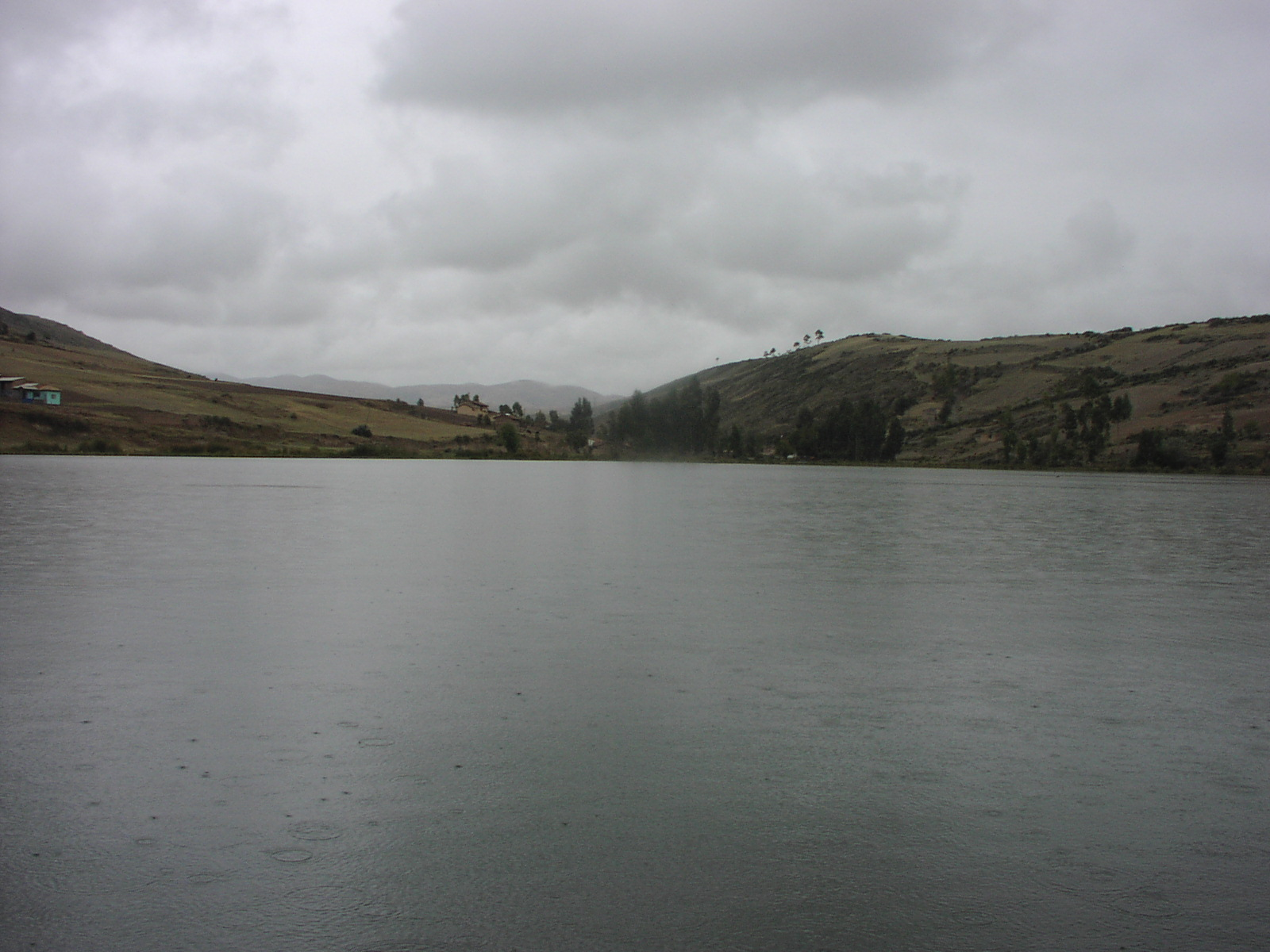
- Lake Ñahuimpuquio

- Location within Peru
- Location: Peru; Junín
- Coordinates: 12°04′14″S 75°20′19″W
- Surface elevation: 3,400 m (11,200 ft)

Lake Ñahuimpuquio (possibly from Quechua ñawi button hole / eye, -n a suffix, pukyu spring of water / source / well) is a lake in Peru located in the Junín Region, Chupaca Province, Ahuac District. Ñahuimpuquio lies northwest of Ahuac and next to the village of Ñahuimpuquio at 3,400 metres (11,155 ft) above sea level.

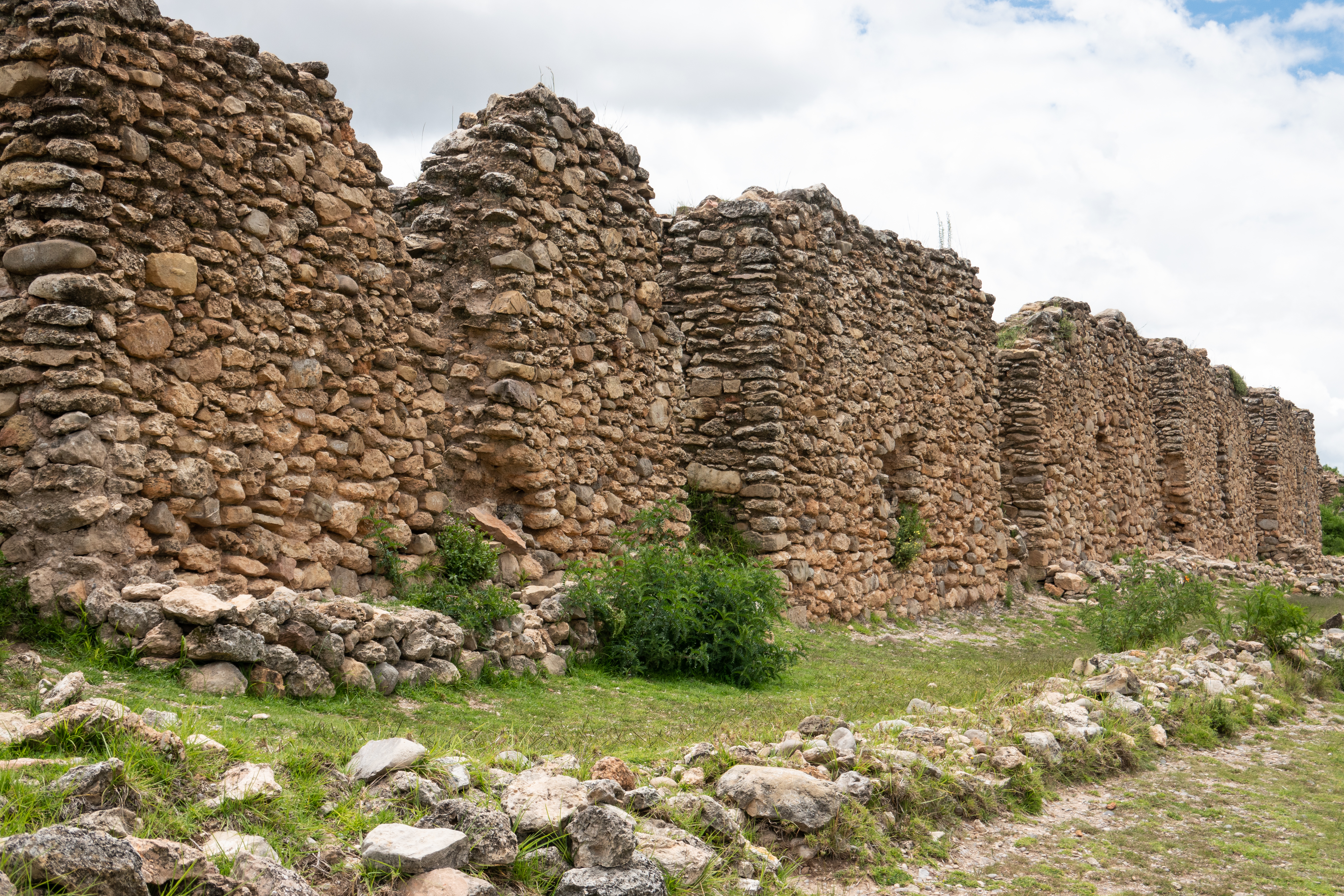
Arwaturo Archaeological Site

Lake Ñahuimpuquio is one of the main tourist attractions at the town of Chupaca since the town and the archaeological remains of Arwaturo are close to the lake; visiting the three places can be done in an hour walk.
