= Yana P'unqu =

Mountain in Peru

- Location within Peru

Highest point
- Elevation: 4,800 m (15,700 ft)
- Coordinates: 12°22′00″S 75°41′08″W

Geography
- Location: Peru, Lima Region
- Parent range: Andes, Cordillera Central

Yana P'unqu (Quechua yana black, p'unqu pond, reservoir, tank; dam, "black pond", also spelled Yanapunco) is mountain Cordillera Central in the Andes of Peru which reaches a height of approximately 4,800 metres (15,748 ft). It is located in the Lima Region, Yauyos Province, Laraos District. Yana P'unqu lies north of a lake named Pumaqucha.
