= Pukap Siqin =

Mountain in Peru

- Location within Peru

Highest point
- Elevation: 4,600 m (15,100 ft)
- Coordinates: 12°23′34″S 75°35′49″W

Geography
- Location: Peru, Lima Region
- Parent range: Andes, Cordillera Central

Pukap Siqin (Quechua puka red, siqi line, -p, -n suffixes, also spelled Pucapsiquin) is a mountain in the Cordillera Central in the Andes of Peru which reaches a height of approximately 4,600 metres (15,092 ft). It is located in the Lima Region, Yauyos Province, Laraos District.
