= Ahuac District =

Ahuac Awaq
- District
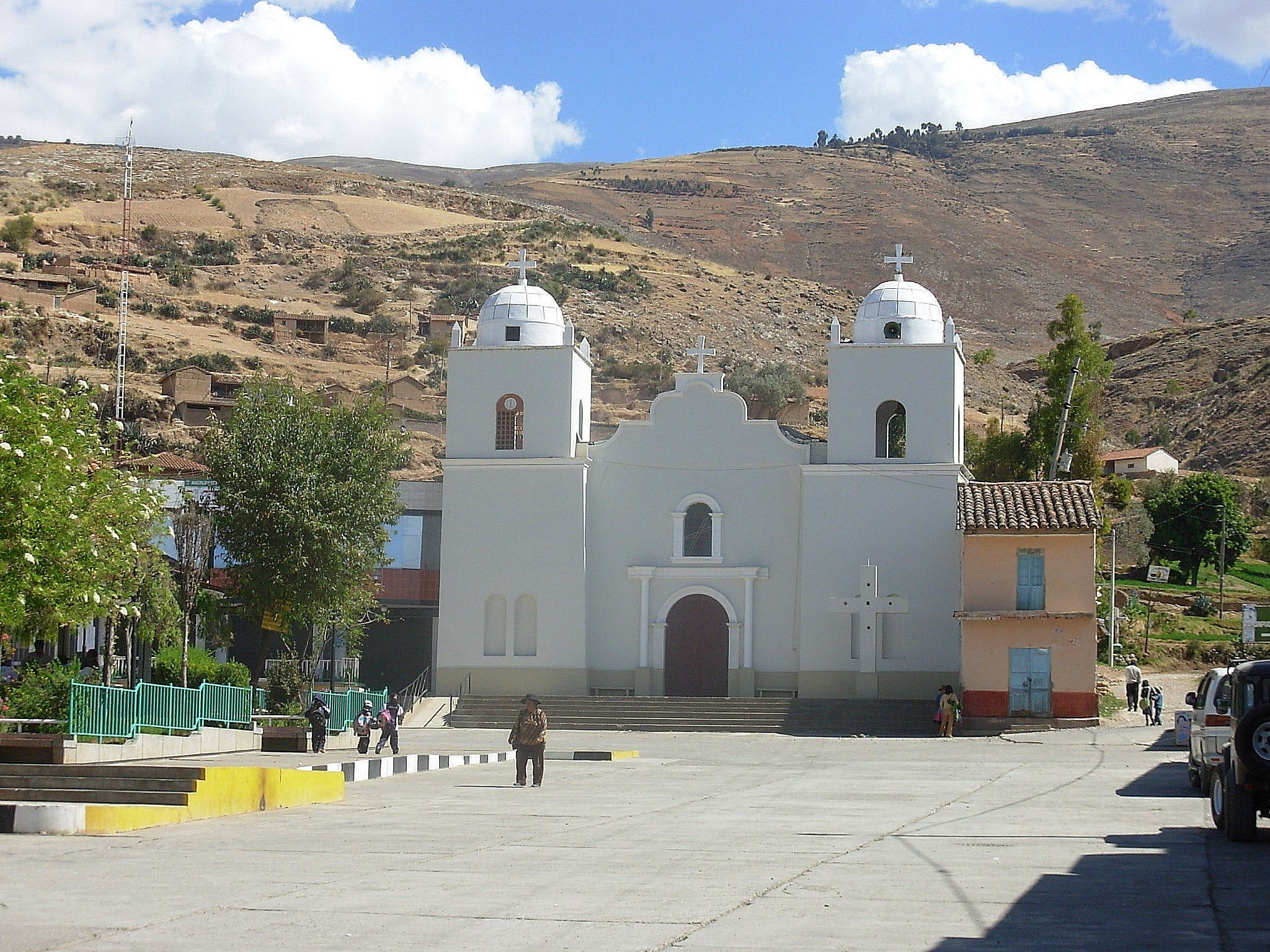

- Location of Ahuac District in Peru
- Coordinates: 12°04′50″S 75°21′20″W
- Country: Peru
- Region: Junín
- Province: Chupaca
- Founded: November 14, 1905
- Capital: Ahuac

Government
  - Mayor: Dario Antonio Rojas Romo

Area
  - Total: 72.04 km^{2} (27.81 sq mi)
- Elevation: 3,315 m (10,876 ft)

Population (2005 census)
  - Total: 7,198
  - Density: 99.92/km^{2} (258.8/sq mi)
- Time zone: UTC-5 (PET)
- UBIGEO: 120902

Ahuac District is one of nine districts of the province Chupaca in Peru.

== See also ==
- Ñawinpukyu
