= Yanacancha District, Chupaca =

Coordinates: 12.2018°S 75.3872°W

Yanacancha Yanakancha
- District
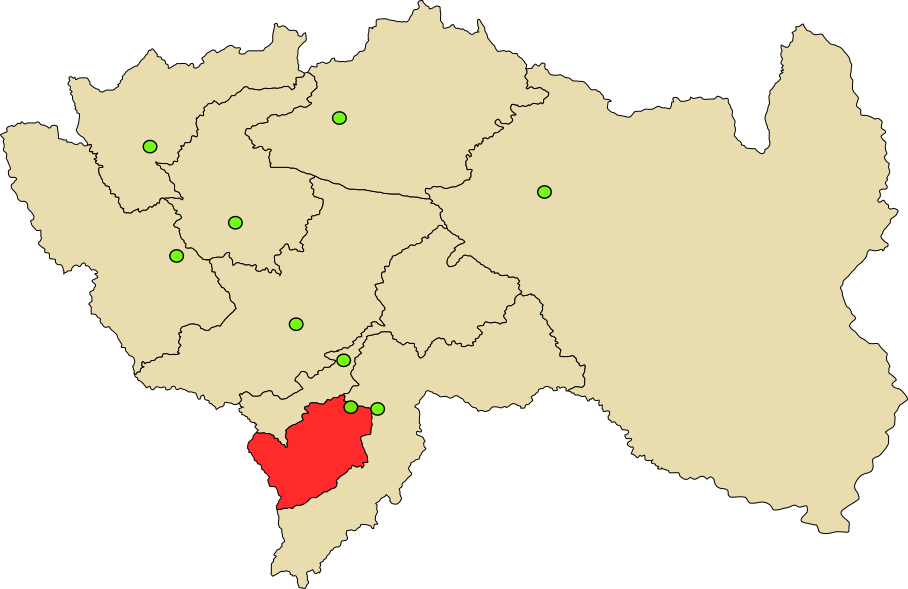
- Interactive map of Yanacancha
- Country: Peru
- Region: Junín
- Province: Chupaca
- Founded: July 14, 1961
- Capital: Yanacancha

Government
  - Mayor: Delfin Ricse Quispe

Area
  - Total: 751.86 km^{2} (290.29 sq mi)
- Elevation: 3,806 m (12,487 ft)

Population (2005 census)
  - Total: 3,350
  - Density: 4.46/km^{2} (11.5/sq mi)
- Time zone: UTC-5 (PET)
- UBIGEO: 120909

Yanacancha District is one of nine districts of the province Chupaca in Peru.

== Climate ==
Climate data for Laive, Yanacancha, elevation 3,833 m (12,575 ft), (1991–2020)
Month	Jan	Feb	Mar	Apr	May	Jun	Jul	Aug	Sep	Oct	Nov	Dec	Year
Mean daily maximum °C (°F)	15.1 (59.2)	14.7 (58.5)	14.6 (58.3)	15.1 (59.2)	15.5 (59.9)	15.5 (59.9)	15.6 (60.1)	15.7 (60.3)	15.7 (60.3)	15.7 (60.3)	16.3 (61.3)	15.4 (59.7)	15.4 (59.7)
Mean daily minimum °C (°F)	2.4 (36.3)	3.0 (37.4)	2.9 (37.2)	0.8 (33.4)	−2.3 (27.9)	−5.4 (22.3)	−5.9 (21.4)	−4.9 (23.2)	−1.5 (29.3)	0.5 (32.9)	0.2 (32.4)	2.1 (35.8)	−0.7 (30.8)
Average precipitation mm (inches)	110.5 (4.35)	112.9 (4.44)	91.4 (3.60)	45.5 (1.79)	13.8 (0.54)	5.7 (0.22)	7.7 (0.30)	11.9 (0.47)	26.3 (1.04)	47.0 (1.85)	40.7 (1.60)	90.7 (3.57)	604.1 (23.77)
Source: National Meteorology and Hydrology Service of Peru

== See also ==
- Kuntur Tiyana
- Qiwllaqucha
- Tuqtu
- Wachwa Runtu
