= Kuntur Tiyana =

Mountain in Peru

- Location within Peru

Highest point
- Elevation: 4,600 m (15,100 ft)
- Coordinates: 12°16′24″S 75°30′52″W

Geography
- Location: Peru, Junín Region
- Parent range: Andes, Cordillera Central

Kuntur Tiyana (Quechua kuntur condor, tiyana seat, "condor seat", also spelled Cóndortiana) is a mountain in the Cordillera Central in the Andes of Peru which reaches a height of approximately 4,600 metres (15,092 ft). It is located in the Junín Region, Chupaca Province, Yanacancha District.
