= Huamancaca Chico District =

Coordinates: 12.0814°S 75.2433°W

Huamancaca Chico Wamanqaqa
- District
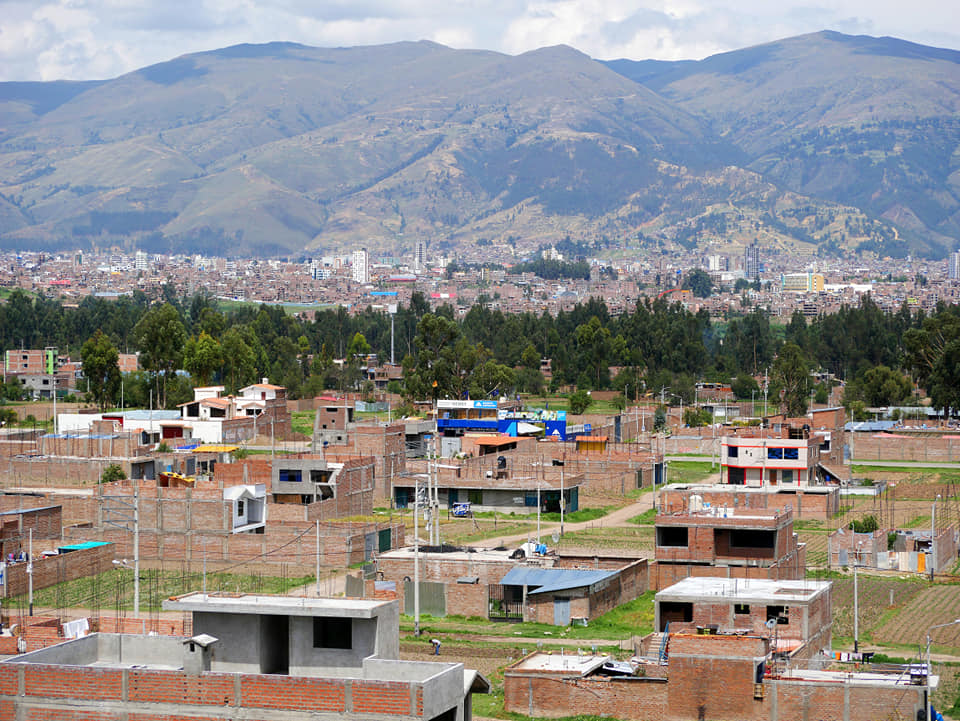
- Interactive map of Huamancaca Chico
- Country: Peru
- Region: Junín
- Province: Chupaca
- Founded: March 6, 1962
- Capital: Huamancaca Chico

Government
  - Mayor: Wilbert Victor Avila Paucar

Area
  - Total: 11.3 km^{2} (4.4 sq mi)
- Elevation: 3,186 m (10,453 ft)

Population (2005 census)
  - Total: 4,365
  - Density: 386/km^{2} (1,000/sq mi)
- Time zone: UTC-5 (PET)
- UBIGEO: 120905

Huamancaca Chico District is one of nine districts of the province Chupaca in Peru.
