= Chalhuacocha (Junín) =

Lake in Junín, Peru

- Location within Peru
- Location: Peru; Junín Region
- Coordinates: 12°00′27″S 75°43′28″W
- Surface elevation: 4,331 m (14,209 ft)

Chalhuacocha (possibly from Quechua challwa fish, qucha lake, "fish lake") is a lake in Peru located in the Junín Region, Jauja Province, Canchayllo District. It lies northeast of the lakes Llacsacocha and Mancacocha, east of the mountain Chalhuacocha and north of the mountain Huiracocha.
