= San Juan de Yscos District =

Coordinates: 12.1005°S 75.2964°W

San Juan de Yscos
- District
- Interactive map of San Juan de Yscos
- Country: Peru
- Region: Junín
- Province: Chupaca
- Founded: September 5, 1940
- Capital: Yscos

Government
  - Mayor: Honorio Jorge Samaniego Lermo

Area
  - Total: 23.85 km^{2} (9.21 sq mi)
- Elevation: 3,240 m (10,630 ft)

Population (2005 census)
  - Total: 2,655
  - Density: 111.3/km^{2} (288.3/sq mi)
- Time zone: UTC-5 (PET)
- UBIGEO: 120906

San Juan de Yscos District is one of nine districts of the province Chupaca in Peru.
