= Wachwa Runtu =

Mountain in Peru

- Location within Peru

Highest point
- Elevation: 4,800 m (15,700 ft)
- Coordinates: 12°23′28″S 75°33′50″W

Geography
- Location: Peru, Junín Region, Lima Region
- Parent range: Andes, Cordillera Central

Wachwa Runtu (Quechua wachwa Andean goose, runtu egg, "Andean goose egg", also spelled Huachhuarunto) is a mountain in the Cordillera Central in the Andes of Peru which reaches a height of approximately 4,800 metres (15,748 ft). It is located in the Junín Region, Chupaca Province, Yanacancha District, and in the Lima Region, Yauyos Province, Laraos District.
