= Abismo Guy Collet =

Cave in Brazil

Coordinates: 0°51′23″S 63°22′18″W

- Interactive map of Abismo Guy Collet
- Location: Barcelos, Amazonas, Brazil
- Depth: 671 metres (2,201 ft)
- Discovery: 2006
- Geology: quartzite

The Abismo Guy Collet (SP-090) is the deepest cave in South America, and the deepest in the world that is formed in quartzite. Located in a tepui in northern Brazil near the border with Venezuela, this cave was first explored by cavers in 2006 to a depth of 671 m (2,201 ft).

Sima Pumacocha in Peru held the previous depth record in South America, determined to be 638 m (2,093 ft) deep in 2004.
