= Yuraq Kancha (Junín) =

Mountain in Peru

- Location within Peru

Highest point
- Elevation: 4,600 m (15,100 ft)
- Coordinates: 11°59′53″S 75°50′06″W

Geography
- Location: Peru, Junín Region
- Parent range: Andes, Cordillera Central

Yuraq Kancha (Quechua yuraq white, kancha corral, enclosure, frame, also spelled Yuraccancha) is a mountain in the Cordillera Central in the Andes of Peru, which reaches a height of approximately 4,600 metres (15,092 ft). It is located in the Junín Region within the Jauja Province and Canchayllo District.
