= Qiwllaqucha (Jauja) =

Mountain in Peru

- Location within Peru

Highest point
- Elevation: 4,400 m (14,400 ft)
- Coordinates: 11°58′01″S 75°49′41″W

Geography
- Location: Peru, Junín Region
- Parent range: Andes, Cordillera Central

Qiwllaqucha (Quechua qillwa, qiwlla, qiwiña gull, qucha lake, "gull lake", also spelled Quiullacocha) is a mountain in the Cordillera Central in the Andes of Peru which reaches a height of approximately 4,400 metres (14,436 ft). It is located in the Junín Region, Jauja Province, Canchayllo District.
