= Chongos Bajo District =

Coordinates: 12.1330°S 75.2683°W

Chongos Bajo
- District
- Copón Church
- Interactive map of Chongos Bajo
- Country: Peru
- Region: Junín
- Province: Chupaca
- Founded: October 5, 1854
- Capital: Chongos Bajo

Government
  - Mayor: Timoteo Munive Guerra

Area
  - Total: 102.74 km^{2} (39.67 sq mi)
- Elevation: 3,269 m (10,725 ft)

Population (2005 census)
  - Total: 4,696
  - Density: 45.71/km^{2} (118.4/sq mi)
- Time zone: UTC-5 (PET)
- UBIGEO: 120903

Chongos Bajo District is one of nine districts of the province Chupaca in Peru.

== History ==
On 19 July 2026, a M_{w} 5.1 earthquake struck Chongos Bajo District, killing five people and injuring 21 others.
