= Huachac District =

Coordinates: 12.0188°S 75.3478°W

Huachac
- District
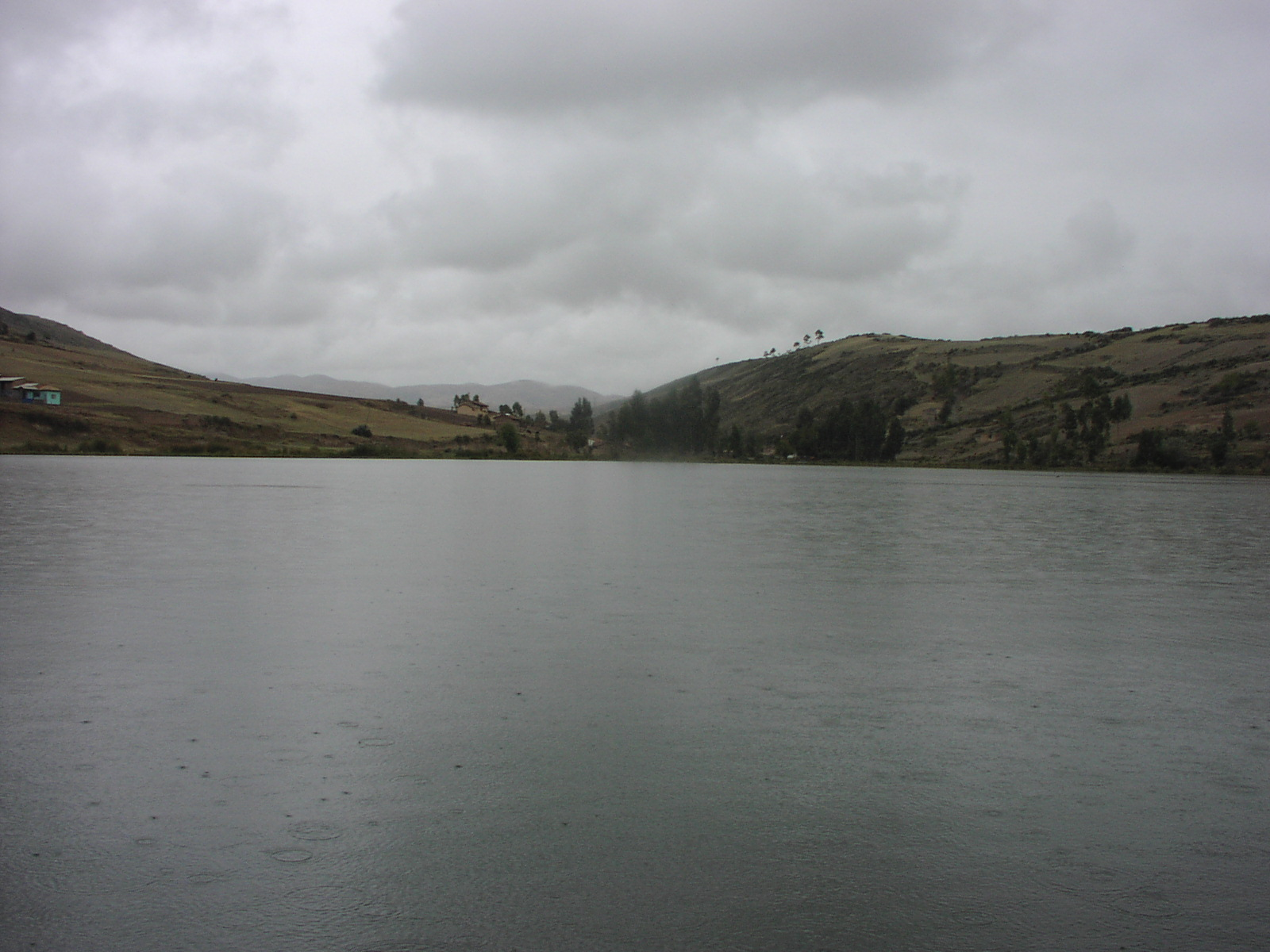
- Interactive map of Huachac
- Country: Peru
- Region: Junín
- Province: Chupaca
- Founded: January 8, 1941
- Capital: Huachac

Government
  - Mayor: José Luis Munive Cerron

Area
  - Total: 20.15 km^{2} (7.78 sq mi)
- Elevation: 3,355 m (11,007 ft)

Population (2005 census)
  - Total: 3,040
  - Density: 151/km^{2} (391/sq mi)
- Time zone: UTC-5 (PET)
- UBIGEO: 120904

Huachac District is one of nine districts of the province Chupaca in Peru.

== Climate ==
Climate data for Huayao, Huachac, elevation 3,321 m (10,896 ft), (1991–2020)
Month	Jan	Feb	Mar	Apr	May	Jun	Jul	Aug	Sep	Oct	Nov	Dec	Year
Mean daily maximum °C (°F)	19.6 (67.3)	19.2 (66.6)	19.0 (66.2)	19.8 (67.6)	20.5 (68.9)	20.1 (68.2)	20.0 (68.0)	20.6 (69.1)	20.8 (69.4)	20.9 (69.6)	21.5 (70.7)	20.3 (68.5)	20.2 (68.3)
Mean daily minimum °C (°F)	6.7 (44.1)	7.0 (44.6)	6.9 (44.4)	5.2 (41.4)	2.5 (36.5)	0.8 (33.4)	0.3 (32.5)	1.9 (35.4)	4.4 (39.9)	5.5 (41.9)	5.5 (41.9)	6.4 (43.5)	4.4 (40.0)
Average precipitation mm (inches)	114.9 (4.52)	120.1 (4.73)	96.4 (3.80)	51.0 (2.01)	15.5 (0.61)	6.4 (0.25)	6.9 (0.27)	12.8 (0.50)	35.3 (1.39)	53.3 (2.10)	57.5 (2.26)	94.6 (3.72)	664.7 (26.16)
Source: National Meteorology and Hydrology Service of Peru
