= Qiwllaqucha (Junín) =

Lake in Peru

- Location within Peru
- Location: Peru; Junín Region
- Coordinates: 12°18′59″S 75°30′49″W
- Max. length: 2.23 km (1.39 mi)
- Max. width: 0.76 km (0.47 mi)
- Surface elevation: 4,536 m (14,882 ft)

Qiwllaqucha (Quechua qillwa, qiwlla, qiwiña gull, qucha lake, "gull lake", hispanicized spelling Quiullacocha) is a lake in Peru located in the Junín Region, Chupaca Province, Yanacancha District. It is situated at a height of about 4,536 metres (14,882 ft), about 2.23 km long and 0.76 km at its widest point.
