= Tres de Diciembre District =

Coordinates: 12.1131°S 75.2463°W

Tres de Diciembre
- District
- Interactive map of Tres de Diciembre
- Country: Peru
- Region: Junín
- Province: Chupaca
- Founded: July 14, 1959
- Capital: Tres de Diciembre

Government
  - Mayor: Virgilio Aquiles Munive Orrego

Area
  - Total: 20.2 km^{2} (7.8 sq mi)
- Elevation: 3,180 m (10,430 ft)

Population (2017 census)
  - Total: 2,665
  - Density: 132/km^{2} (342/sq mi)
- Time zone: UTC-5 (PET)
- UBIGEO: 120908

Tres de Diciembre District is one of nine districts of the province Chupaca in Peru.
