= Qarwaqucha (Junín) =

- Location within Peru
- Location: Junín Region
- Coordinates: 11°56′40″S 75°57′52″W
- Basin countries: Peru

Qarwaqucha Dam
- Location within Peru

Dam and spillways
- Height: 12 m (39 ft)

Power Station
- Operator: Electroperú S.A.

Qarwaqucha (Quechua qarwa yellowish, qucha lake, hispanicized spelling Carhuacocha) is a lake in Peru located in the Junín Region, Jauja Province, Canchayllo District. It lies southeast of the peaks of Tunshu and Tukumach'ay and west of a lake named Wayllakancha (Huayllacancha). It belongs to the watershed of the Mantaro River.

The Qarwaqucha dam was built in 1995. It is 12 m (13 yd) high. It was constructed by GUICONSA and is operated by Electroperú S.A.

== See also ==
- List of lakes in Peru
