= Chupaca province =

Coordinates: 12°03′36″S 75°17′24″W

Chupaca
- Province
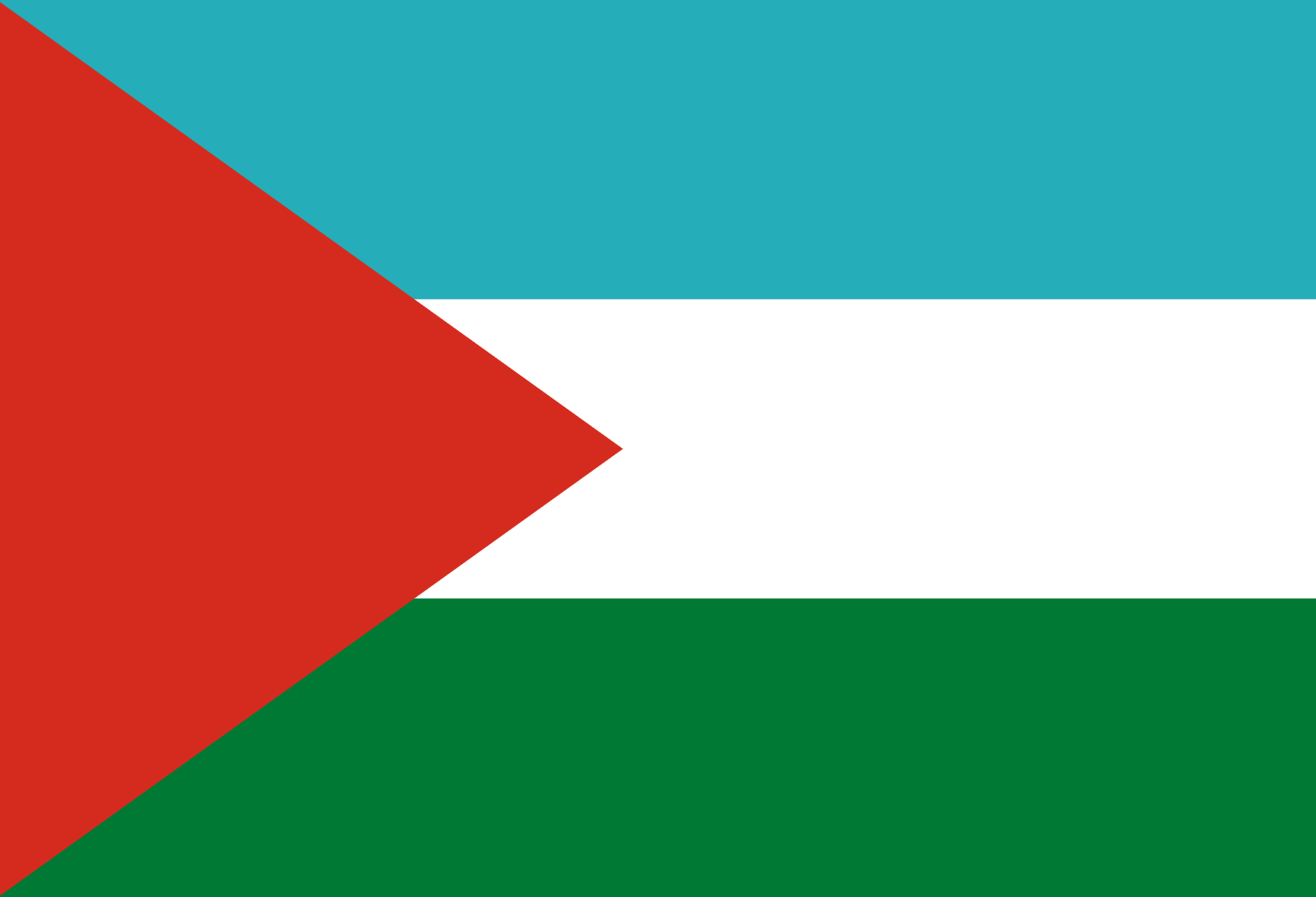
- Flag Coat of arms

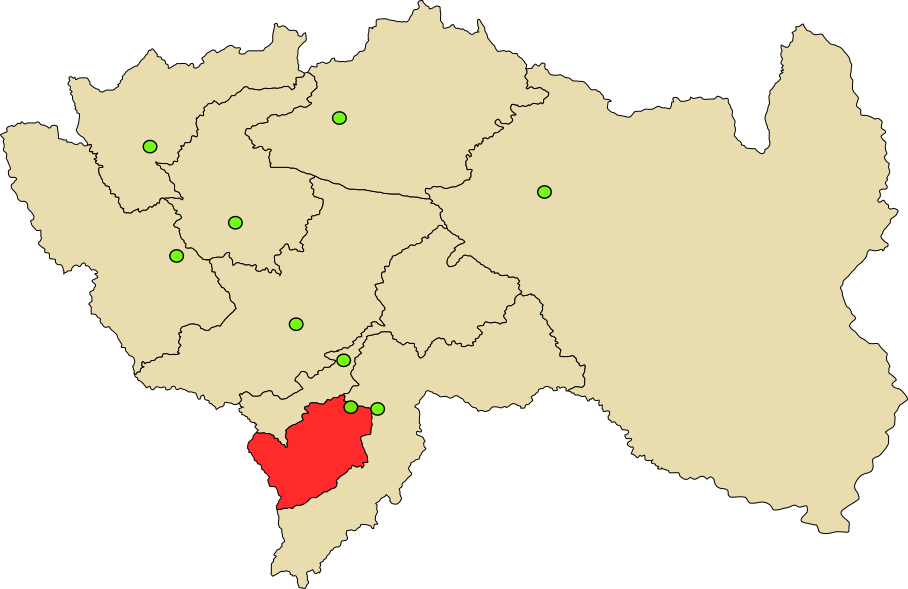
- Location of Chupaca in the Junín Region
- Country: Peru
- Region: Junín
- Capital: Chupaca

Government
  - Mayor: Luis Alberto Bastidas Vasquez

Area
  - Total: 1,153.05 km^{2} (445.20 sq mi)
- Elevation: 3,263 m (10,705 ft)

Population
  - Total: 51,340
  - Density: 44.53/km^{2} (115.3/sq mi)
- UBIGEO: 1209
- Website: www.munichupaca.gob.pe

Chupaca, located in central Peru, is one of the nine provinces that compose the Junín Region, bordering to the north with the province of Concepción, to the east with the province of Huancayo, to the south with the Huancavelica Region, and to the west with the Lima Region. The province has a population of approximately 57,000 inhabitants, and the capital is Chupaca.

== Geography ==
Chupaca is located 297 kilometers [km] (185 mi) from Lima and has a temperate and dry climate. Located within the province is the lake Ñawinpukyu 15 km (9.3 mi) west of the city Huancayo, with surface water spanning 7 hectares (17 acres), where the breeding of trout, mule trips, and boating occur.

One of the highest peaks of the province is Wachwa Runtu at approximately 4,800 m (15,700 ft). Other mountains are listed below:

- Amaru Punta
- Aqus Sirk'a
- Atuq Wachana
- Chunta
- Ch'ampa Qutu
- Ch'uwata
- Kimsa Utra
- Kuntur
- Liswar Punta
- Kunkan Punta
- Kuntur Tiyana
- Llant'a Pallana
- Mina Ulu
- Misayuq
- Mit'u Pampa
- Mit'u Pukyu
- Ñuñun Urqu
- Paka Qutu
- Puka Qutu
- Puka Saywa
- Puriq Ch'ampa
- Puywanniyuq
- Q'ala Ulu
- Saywa
- Titi Mina
- Tullpayuq
- Tuqtu
- T'asta
- Wamanripa
- Waqrasniyuq
- Wayta Wayta
- Wiska Wiska
- Yana Ulu
- Yana Urqu
- Yanasniyuq
- Yantayuq

== Political division ==
The province is divided into nine districts (with main towns).

- Ahuac District (Ahuac)
- Chongos Bajo District (Chongos Bajo)
- Chupaca District (Chupaca)
- Huachac District (Huachac)
- Huamancaca Chico District (Huamancaca Chico)
- San Juan de Jarpa District (Jarpa)
- San Juan de Yscos District (Yscos)
- Tres de Diciembre District (Tres de Diciembre)
- Yanacancha District (Yanacancha)

== Places of interest and importance ==
- Huayao - 12 km (7.5 mi) from Huancayo; facilities including a Geophysical Observatory, where meteorological studies, nuclear physics, and other topics are studied.
- Ñawinpukyu - The name of the lake comes from a Quechua word meaning "eye spring". It is 5 minutes from the Ahuac and 11 kilometers (7 mi) from Huancayo. To the flank of the lake, there is a hill with the archaeological remains of the Arwaturu.

== History ==
Furthest back in the known history of the province of Chupaca the Arwaturu tribe located alongside the lake named Ñawinpukyu constructed buildings from stone and mud that aligned to the north and to the south in such a way that they received all the rays from the sun.

Low the Chongos; a town 20 kilometers (12 mi) south of Huancayo has a church dating back to 1540 with altars carved in baroque style.

== See also ==
- Qiwllaqucha
