= San Juan de Jarpa District =

Coordinates: 12.1239°S 75.4359°W

San Juan de Jarpa
- District
- Interactive map of San Juan de Jarpa
- Country: Peru
- Region: Junín
- Province: Chupaca
- Founded: October 16, 1933
- Capital: Jarpa

Government
  - Mayor: Alejandro Camac Salvatierra

Area
  - Total: 129 km^{2} (50 sq mi)
- Elevation: 3,646 m (11,962 ft)

Population (2005 census)
  - Total: 3,573
  - Density: 27.7/km^{2} (71.7/sq mi)
- Time zone: UTC-5 (PET)
- UBIGEO: 120907

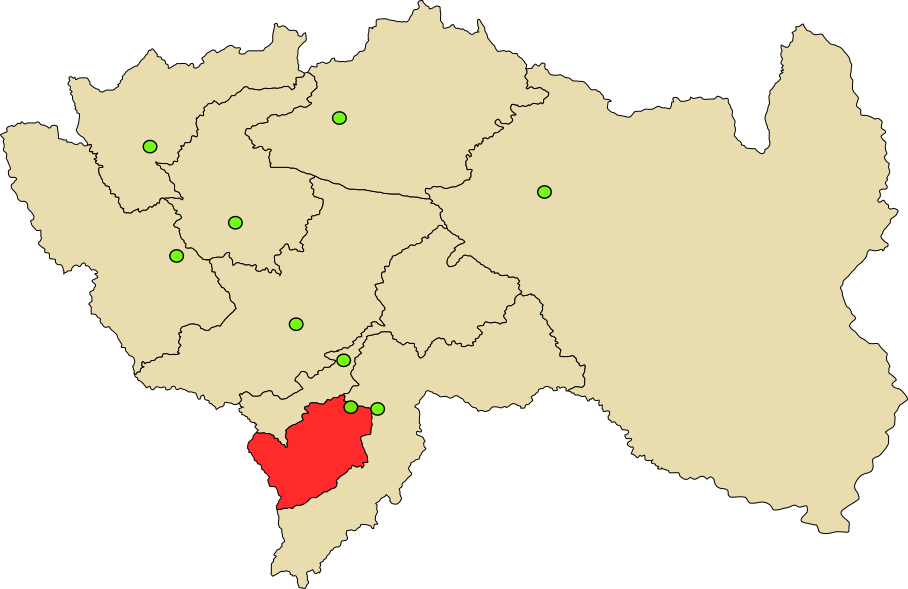
Chupaca Province

San Juan de Jarpa District is one of nine districts of the province Chupaca in Peru.

== Climate ==
Climate data for San Juan de Jarpa, elevation 3,660 m (12,010 ft), (1991–2020)
Month	Jan	Feb	Mar	Apr	May	Jun	Jul	Aug	Sep	Oct	Nov	Dec	Year
Mean daily maximum °C (°F)	15.9 (60.6)	15.6 (60.1)	15.3 (59.5)	15.9 (60.6)	16.5 (61.7)	16.2 (61.2)	16.0 (60.8)	16.5 (61.7)	16.7 (62.1)	16.9 (62.4)	17.5 (63.5)	16.3 (61.3)	16.3 (61.3)
Mean daily minimum °C (°F)	5.2 (41.4)	5.8 (42.4)	5.6 (42.1)	4.1 (39.4)	1.8 (35.2)	0.0 (32.0)	−0.6 (30.9)	0.6 (33.1)	2.6 (36.7)	3.9 (39.0)	4.1 (39.4)	5.0 (41.0)	3.2 (37.7)
Average precipitation mm (inches)	114.7 (4.52)	147.8 (5.82)	136.7 (5.38)	61.4 (2.42)	24.2 (0.95)	5.7 (0.22)	9.4 (0.37)	12.3 (0.48)	40.3 (1.59)	63.1 (2.48)	64.4 (2.54)	106.2 (4.18)	786.2 (30.95)
Source: National Meteorology and Hydrology Service of Peru
