= Yuraqqucha (Jauja) =

- Location within Peru
- Location: Junín Region
- Coordinates: 11°53′45″S 75°50′31″W
- Basin countries: Peru

Yuraqqucha Dam
- Location within Peru

Dam and spillways
- Height: 3.5 m (11 ft)

Power Station
- Operator: Electroperu

Yuraqqucha (Quechua yuraq white, qucha lake, "white lake", hispanicized spelling Yuraccocha) is a lake in Peru.

== Overview ==
It is situated in the Junín Region, Jauja Province, Canchayllo District, east of Wich'iqucha. It belongs to the watershed of the Mantaro River.

In 1995, the Yuraqqucha dam was erected at the northern end of the lake at 11°53′12.7″S 75°50′36.8″W. It is 3.5 m (3.8 yd) in height. It is operated by Electroperu.

== See also ==
- List of lakes in Peru
