= Chakraqucha (Lima) =

Mountain in Peru

- Location within Peru

Highest point
- Elevation: 4,600 m (15,100 ft)
- Coordinates: 12°08′25″S 76°03′58″W

Geography
- Location: Peru, Lima Region
- Parent range: Andes, Cordillera Central

Chakraqucha (Quechua chakra field, qucha lake, "field lake", hispanicized spelling Chacracocha) is a mountain, lying south of a small lake of the same name in the Cordillera Central in the Andes of Peru, about 4,600 m (15,100 ft) high. It is located in both the Lima Region, Huarochirí Province, Quinti District, and in the Yauyos Province, Tanta District.

The lake named Chakraqucha lies north of the mountain at 12°07′53″S 76°04′10″W.
