= Wich'iqucha (Jauja) =

- Location within Peru
- Location: Junín Region
- Coordinates: 11°53′26″S 75°52′21″W
- Basin countries: Peru

Wich'iqucha Dam
- Location within Peru

Dam and spillways
- Height: 5.5 m (18 ft)

Power Station
- Operator: Electroperu

Wich'iqucha (Quechua wich'i a large, wide-mouthed pitcher, qucha lake, "pitcher lake", Hispanicized spelling Vichecocha) is a lake in Peru. It is situated in the Junín Region, Jauja Province, Canchayllo District, west of Yuraqqucha. The lake belongs to the watershed of the Mantaro River.

The Wich'iqucha dam was built in 1995. It is 5.5 m (6.0 yd) high. It is operated by Electroperu.

== See also ==
- List of lakes in Peru
