= Kuntur Waqta =

Mountain in Peru

- Location within Peru

Highest point
- Elevation: 4,800 m (15,700 ft)
- Coordinates: 12°20′34″S 75°36′10″W

Geography
- Location: Peru, Lima Region
- Parent range: Andes, Cordillera Central

Kuntur Waqta (Quechua kuntur condor, waqta side, flank, "condor side", Hispanicized spelling Cóndorhuacta) is a mountain in the Cordillera Central in the Andes of Peru which reaches an altitude of approximately 4,800 m (15,700 ft). It is located in the Lima Region, Yauyos Province, Laraos District.
