= Tukumach'ay (Jauja) =

Mountain in Peru

- Location within Peru

Highest point
- Elevation: 5,350 m (17,550 ft)
- Coordinates: 11°55′09″S 75°58′33″W

Geography
- Location: Peru, Junín Region
- Parent range: Andes, Paryaqaqa mountain range

Tukumach'ay or Tuku Mach'ay (Quechua tuku owl, t'uqu a niche in the wall, mach'ay a cave / a niche in the wall, Hispanicized spelling Tucumachay) is a mountain in the Paryaqaqa or Waruchiri mountain range in the Andes of Peru, about 5,350 metres (17,552 ft) high. It is situated in the Junín Region, Jauja Province, Canchayllo District. Tukumach'ay lies north-east of the Paryaqaqa, between the mountain Tunshu in the northwest and the lake Qarwaqucha in the southeast.
