= Chupaca District =

Coordinates: 12.0622°S 75.2888°W

Chupaca
- District
- Interactive map of Chupaca
- Country: Peru
- Region: Junín
- Province: Chupaca
- Capital: Chupaca

Government
  - Mayor: Marco Antonio Mendoza Ortiz

Area
  - Total: 21.91 km^{2} (8.46 sq mi)
- Elevation: 3,263 m (10,705 ft)

Population (2017)
  - Total: 20,341
  - Density: 928.4/km^{2} (2,405/sq mi)
- Time zone: UTC-5 (PET)
- UBIGEO: 120901

Chupaca District is one of nine districts of the province Chupaca in Peru.
