= Hatun Ukru =

Mountain in Peru

- Location within Peru

Highest point
- Elevation: 4,800 m (15,700 ft)
- Coordinates: 12°04′35″S 76°05′42″W

Geography
- Location: Peru, Lima Region
- Parent range: Andes, Cordillera Central

Hatun Ukru (Quechua hatun big, ukru hole, pit, hollow, "big hollow", Hispanicized spelling Atunucro) is a mountain in the Cordillera Central in the Andes of Peru, about 4,800 m (15,748 ft) high. It is situated in the Lima Region, Huarochirí Province, Quinti District. Hatun Ukru lies southwest of a lake named P'itiqucha.
