= Kunkus (Yauli) =

Mountain in Peru

- Location within Peru

Highest point
- Elevation: 5,000 m (16,000 ft)
- Coordinates: 11°48′51″S 76°04′12″W

Geography
- Location: Peru, Junín Region
- Parent range: Andes, Paryaqaqa

Kunkus (Ancash Quechua kunkush Puya raimondii, hispanicized spelling Cuncus) is a mountain in the Paryaqaqa mountain range in the Andes of Peru which reaches an altitude of approximately 5,000 m (16,000 ft). It is located in the Junín Region, Yauli Province, Yauli District. Kunkus lies northwest of Putka and Yantayuq.
