= Quri Winchus =

Archaeological site in Peru

- Interactive map of Quri Winchus
- 11°51′20.6″S 75°44′48.8″W
- Cultures: Wanka
- Location: Peru, Junín Region, Jauja Province, Canchayllo District

Site notes
- Height: 3,850 m (12,630 ft)
- Area: 2.2 ha (5.4 acres)

Quri Winchus (Quechua quri gold, winchus hummingbird, "gold hummingbird", hispanicized spellings Cori Vinchos, Cori-Vinchos, Corivinchos) is an archaeological site with remains of circular buildings of the Wanka period in Peru. It is located in the Junín Region, Jauja Province, Canchayllo District. The site was declared a National Cultural Heritage by Resolución Directoral Nacional No. 925 on September 18, 2001. It is situated at a height of 3,850 m (12,630 ft) at the foot of a mountain named Winchus (Vinchos).

== See also ==
- Hatunmarka
- Tunanmarka
- Waqlamarka
