= Chupaca =

- Town
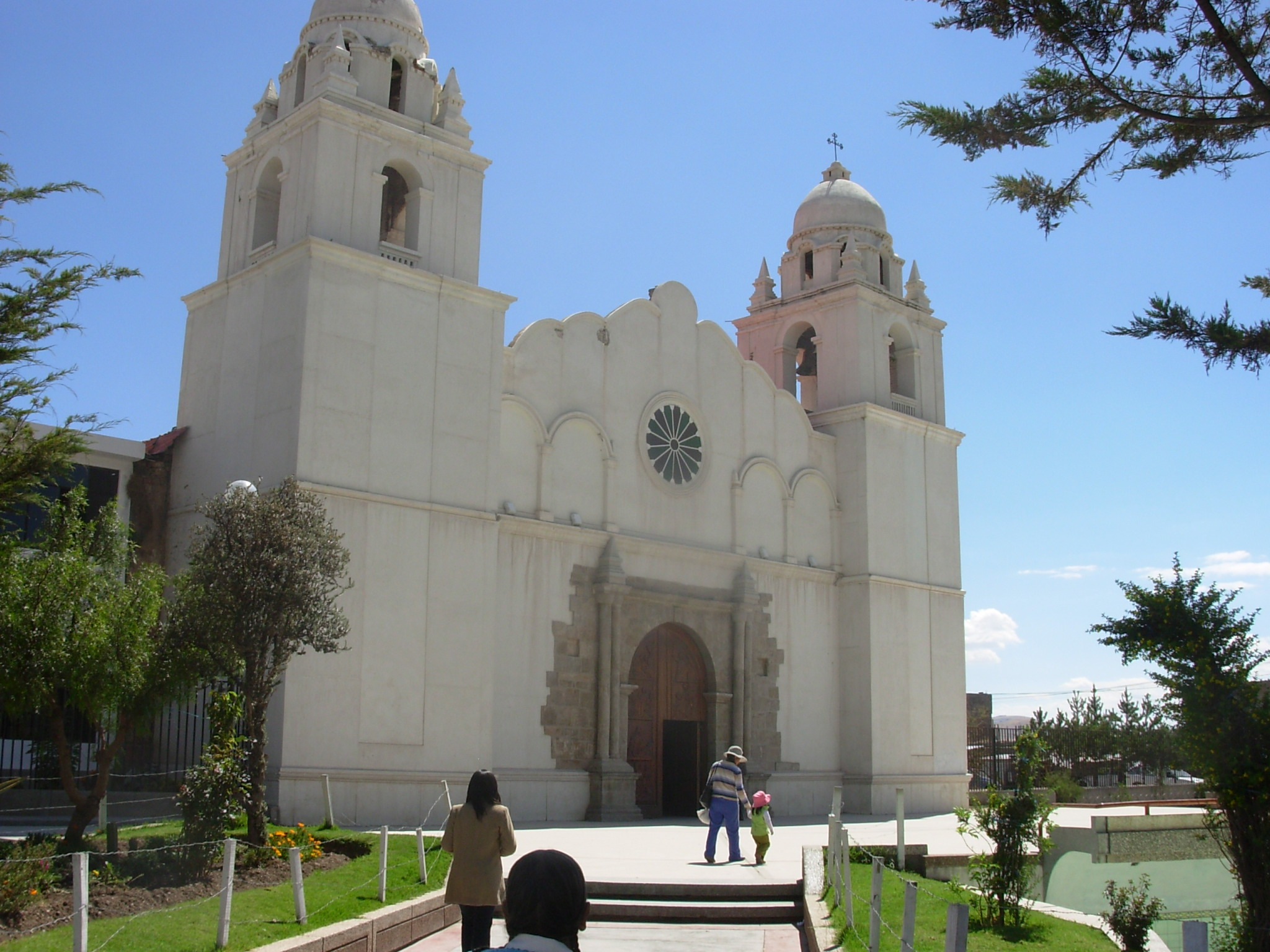
- A church in Chupaca

- Location within Peru
- Coordinates: 12°13′43.21″S 75°17′13.84″W
- Country: Peru
- Region: Junín
- Province: Chupaca
- District: Chupaca

Government
  - Mayor: Marco Antonio Mendoza Ortiz
- Elevation: 3,263 m (10,705 ft)

Population
  - Total: 9,877
- Time zone: UTC-5 (PET)
- Website: www.munichupaca.gob.pe

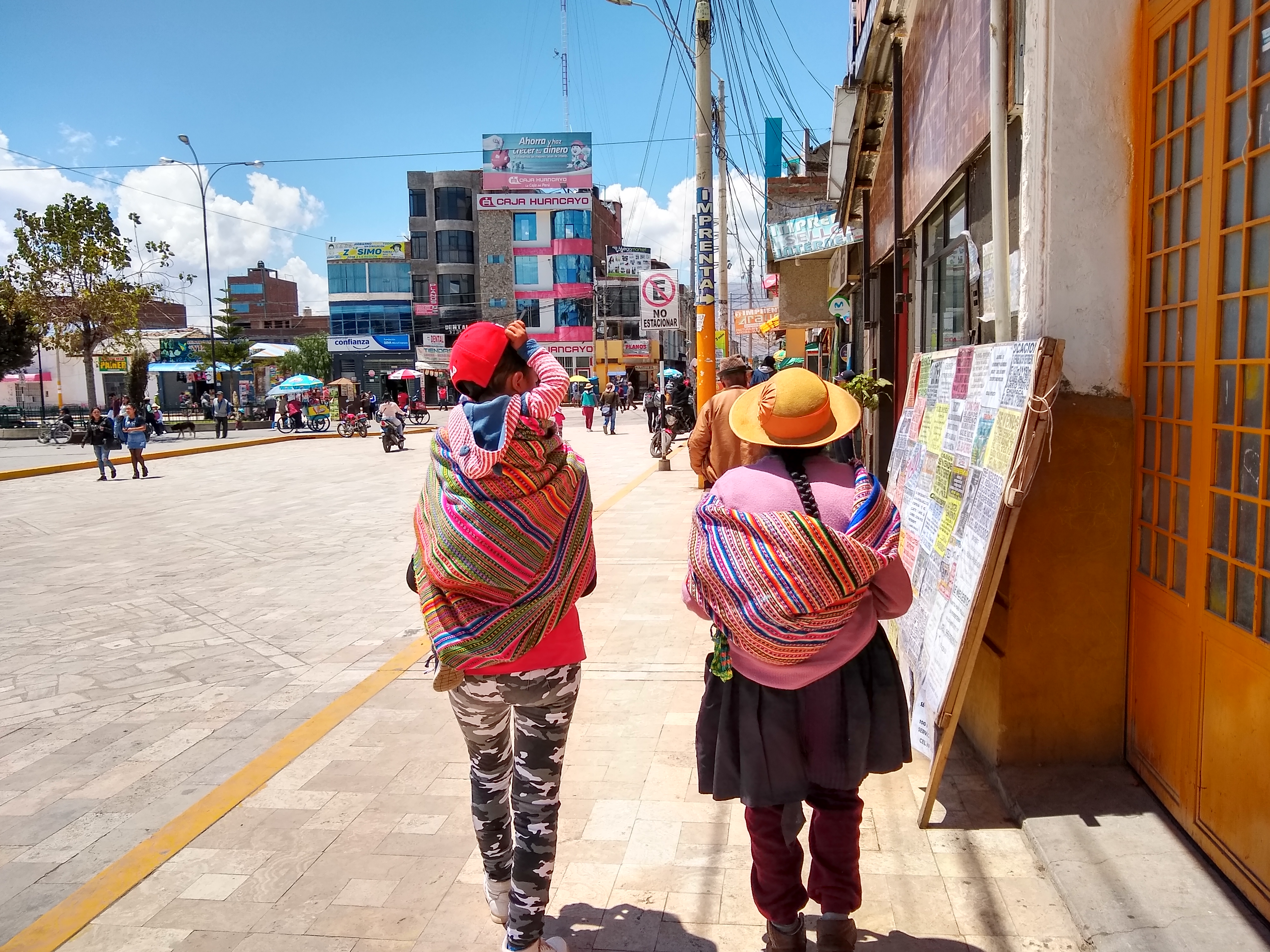
Women at town square in Chupaca Peru

Chupaca is a town in central Peru, capital of the province Chupaca in the region Junín.
