= Antaqucha (Jauja) =

Lake in Jauja Province, Peru

- Location within Peru
- Location: Junín Region, Jauja Province
- Coordinates: 11°54′8.8″S 75°55′3.2″W
- Basin countries: Peru

Antaqucha (Quechua anta copper, qucha lake, "copper lake", Hispanicized spelling Antacocha) is a lake in Peru located in the Junín Region, Jauja Province, Canchayllo District. It belongs to the watershed of the Mantaro River.

There are plans to build a 7.4 m (24 ft) high dam at the lake.

== See also ==
- List of lakes in Peru
