= P'itiqucha (Quinti) =

Lake in Peru

- Location within Peru
- Location: Lima Region
- Coordinates: 12°03′06″S 76°01′52″W
- Basin countries: Peru
- Max. length: 2.79 km (1.73 mi)
- Max. width: 0.56 km (0.35 mi)
- Surface elevation: 4,410 m (14,470 ft)

P'itiqucha (Quechua p'iti to divide by pulling powerfully to the extremes / gap, interruption, qucha lake, lagoon, "gap lake", hispanicized spelling Peticocha, Piticocha) is a lake in Peru located in the Lima Region, Huarochiri Province, Quinti District. It is situated at a height of about 4,410 metres (14,469 ft), about 2.79 km long and 0.56 km at its widest point. P'itiqucha lies south of the Paryaqaqa mountain range and the lakes named Ch'uspiqucha and Paryachaka, west of Mulluqucha and northwest of Pawqarqucha.

The sea ground of P'itiqucha is elevated in the middle which almost divides it into two parts. The naming of the lake refers to this interruption.

== See also ==
- Nor Yauyos-Cochas Landscape Reserve
- List of lakes in Peru
