= Wararayuq =

Mountain in Peru

- Location within Peru

Highest point
- Elevation: 5,354 m (17,566 ft)
- Coordinates: 11°57′12″S 76°05′15″W

Geography
- Location: Peru, Lima Region
- Parent range: Andes, Paryaqaqa

Wararayuq (Quechua warara horn, -yuq a suffix to indicate ownership, "the one with a horn", Hispanicized spelling Huararayoc) is a 5,354-metre-high (17,566 ft) mountain in the Paryaqaqa mountain range in the Andes of Peru. It is located in the Lima Region, Huarochirí Province, Quinti District. Wararayuq lies northwest of Qullqi P'ukru.
