= Mancacocha =

Lake in Peru

- Location within Peru
- Location: Peru; Junín Region
- Coordinates: 12°01′41″S 75°44′22″W
- Surface elevation: 4,414 m (14,482 ft)

Mancacocha (possibly from Quechua mankha a gap deformed by continuous use, qucha lake) is a lake in Peru located in the Junín Region, Jauja Province, Canchayllo District. It lies east of the lake Llacsacocha, southwest of the lake Chalhuacocha and south of the mountain Chalhuacocha (possibly from Quechua Challwaqucha). Mancacocha is connected with the lake Chaquipaque (possibly from Quechua Chakip'aki for "foot fracture") southeast of it, situated at the foot of the mountain Chaquipaque.
