= Wamanripa (San Mateo) =

Mountain in Peru

- Location within Peru

Highest point
- Elevation: 5,110 m (16,770 ft)
- Coordinates: 11°54′17″S 76°06′36″W

Geography
- Location: Peru, Lima Region, Huarochirí Province, San Mateo District
- Parent range: Andes, Paryaqaqa

Wamanripa (local name for Senecio or a species of it, also applied for Laccopetalum giganteum, Hispanicized spelling Huamanripa) is a 5,110-metre-high (16,765 ft) mountain in the Paryaqaqa mountain range in the Andes of Peru. It is situated in the Lima Region, Huarochirí Province, San Mateo District. Wamanripa lies northwest of Phaqcha and Uqsha Wallqa and northeast of Waqaypaka.
