= Lake Llacsacocha =

Lake in Junín, Peru

- Location within Peru
- Location: Peru; Junín Region
- Coordinates: 12°01′43″S 75°45′18″W
- Surface elevation: 4,393 m (14,413 ft)

Lake Llacsacocha (possibly from Quechua llaksa puna teal (Anas puna); fearful; melting of metals; metal; bronze; a small ceremonial collar, qucha lake) is a lake in Peru located in the Junín Region, Jauja Province, Canchayllo District. It lies northeast of a lake with the same name, southwest of Chalhuacocha and west of Mancacocha.
