= Qaqa Mach'ay =

Limestone cave in Yauyos, Lima, Peru

Qaqa Mach'ay (Quechua for "rock cave") is a limestone cave located in the Yauyos Province of the Lima Region in central Peru, high in the Andes Mountains that was explored and surveyed in 2004 by an international expedition. At 4,930m above sea level, it is the highest surveyed cave in the world (subsequent GPS measurements suggest this elevation is understated). The entrance to the cave is in the mountain named Wamp'una.

== Cave description ==
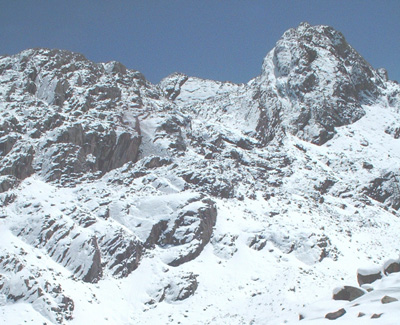
The mountain named Wamp'una; entrance to Qaqa Mach'ay at left centre

"It is thought that Qaqa Mach'ay is an abandoned glacial sink formed on a geologically-favourable bedding plane. Its enormous entrance, approximately fifty metres long, thirty metres wide and fifty metres deep, leads to a square-shaped descending passage twenty metres high and twenty metres wide. Although this large passage is almost completely blocked by boulders, two possible continuations were noted. Blue Lips Passage essentially follows the left (as you face into the cave) wall down past boulders and ice masses. Four pitches of 20m, 10m, 10m and 5m lead to a disappointing boulder ruckle 104m below the entrance. Red Face Passage descends down pitches of 18m, 9m, 4m and 38m to a breakdown floor at –125m. Both passages draught slightly. These passages were named for the effects of high altitude, cold and sun on the cavers’ complexions. About a third of the rigging in these passages was off ice screws. No open leads remain in the cave."

- excerpt from Pumaqucha 2004 Expedition Report (unpublished)

== See also ==
- Pumaqucha
- Sima Pumaqucha
