= Sima Pumacocha =

Limestone cave in Peru

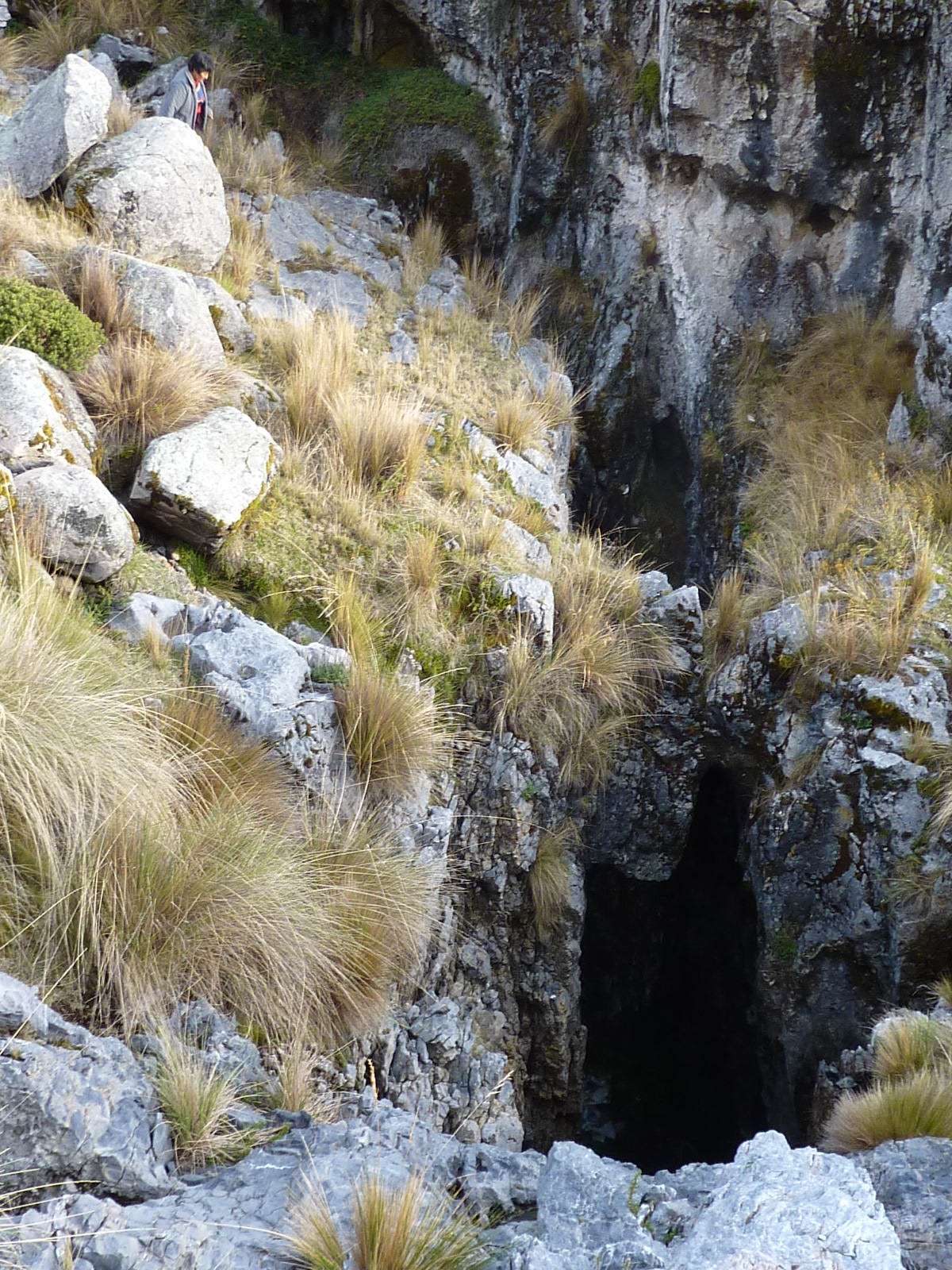
Pumaqucha cave entrance

Sima Pumacocha (possibly from Spanish sima deep and dark cavern/abyss, Quechua puma cougar, puma, qucha lake) is a limestone cave located in the Lima Region, Yauyos Province, Laraos District, in central Peru near the village of Laraos, high in the Andes mountains. At 638 meters deep, it held the record for deepest known cave in South America from 2001 to 2006 when it was surpassed by Abismo Guy Collet. With the entrance being 4372 meters above sea level and the depth being over 500 meters, it is the highest major cave in the world. It is located at 12.3914°S 75.7°W.

== Setting ==
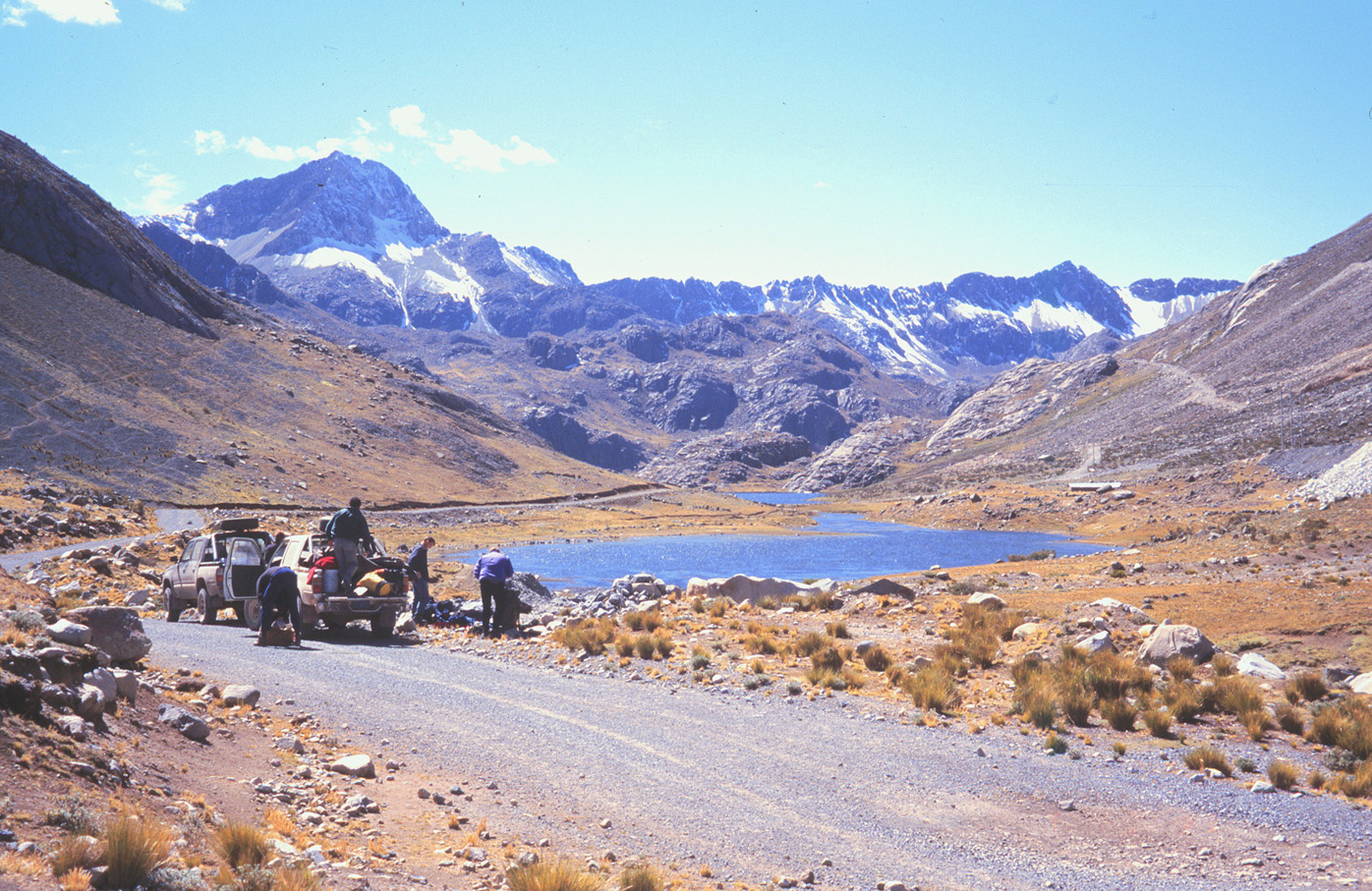
Cavers at Pumaqucha ("cougar lake") offloading equipment for Sima Pumaqucha. The mountain in the background is Léon Pitakana.

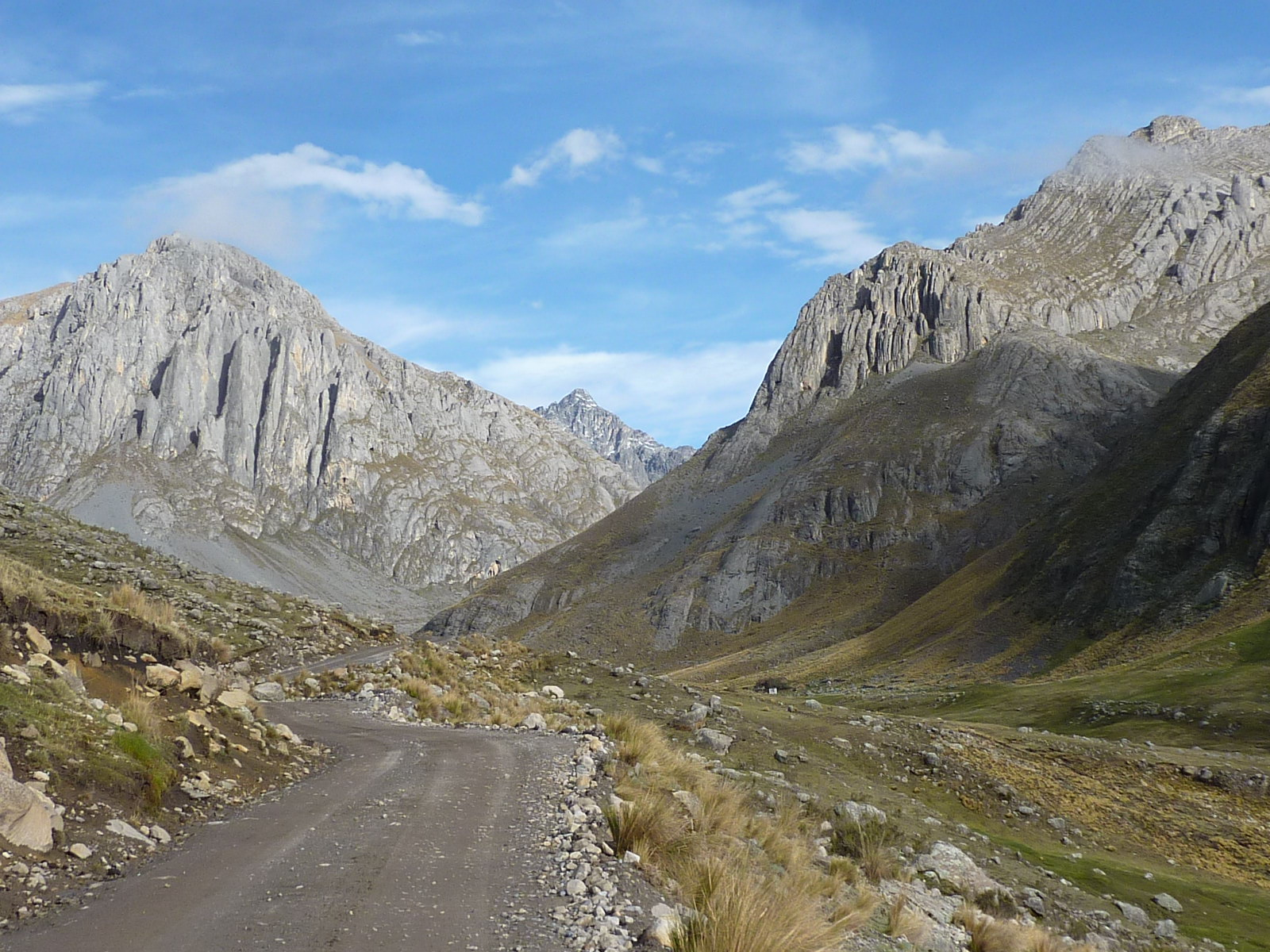
Rock formations 700 meters from road and cave entrance.

At 4,300 m to 4,400 m above sea level, the Pumaqucha valley is a typical Andes 'puna' – high, treeless, and surrounded by 5,000 m peaks. The valley is traversed by a dirt road serving active and abandoned mines nearby, and is dotted with stone huts used by locals tending flocks of sheep, llamas and alpacas. At the head of the valley is Pumaqucha, a small lake which along with its catchment area sits atop Miocene age granodiorite. Where the lake's outfall stream meets near-vertically bedded Cretaceous age Jumasha limestones, it has carved a short, shallow canyon containing several abandoned and one active sinkpoint where the entire stream disappears underground. Underlying the limestone is the Lower Cretaceous Pariatambo Formation.

A small concrete canal, intended to keep the lake outfall on the surface by diverting it around the canyon, is in poor shape and normally does not function at all. When local repairs occur, the active sinkpoint (SP1) becomes enterable, but considerable water then leaks into the abandoned sinks (SP2 and SP3).

On a regional scale, the long, irregular band of limestone containing Sima Pumaqucha and several other caves runs roughly south-southeast to north-northwest. The Pumaqucha waters sink at an elevation of 4,375 m above sea level, and are thought to resurge in the Rio Alis valley some 14 km to the north at an elevation of about 3,300 m above sea level.

== Description ==
Following the steeply-dipping limestone beds, Sima Pumaqucha generally consists of several vertical shafts connected by short sections of horizontal to steeply-sloping passages. Although closely grouped together, the three main entrances each lead to extensive independent passages before meeting underground. SP1 and SP2 are within 60 m of each other but their passages join at about the –300 m level, while SP3, a further 30 m away, is thought to join the main cave at a depth of –550 m based on observations of relative water volumes (SP3 is blocked at –120 m). All three entrances lead to big shafts: SP1 has the deepest shaft in the Andes (282 m), SP2 leads to the 113-meter-deep Ammonite Shaft, and SP3 is a 120 m shaft. Several fossilized ammonites up to 20 cm in diameter were observed within Ammonite Shaft’s walls. Below the junction of SP1 and SP2 are several wet shafts between 15 m and 75 m in depth, leading to a gravelled sump at –638 m. All explored passages have been surveyed, with a total length of 1,427 m.

== Exploration ==
Sima Pumaqucha was explored and surveyed during three international expeditions.

- In June 2001 an expedition of five cavers ran out of rope and time at the head of The Perfect Storm at about –375 m.
- In September 2002 an expedition of nine cavers reached the sump at –638 m, and located other cave entrances within the same limestone formation.
- In September 2004 an expedition of fourteen cavers explored the SP1 series and five other caves, including Qaqa Mach'ay.

== See also ==
- Qaqa Mach'ay
- Wamp'una
