= Colquepucro =

Mountain in Peru

- Location within Peru

Highest point
- Elevation: 5,658 m (18,563 ft)
- Coordinates: 11°58′22″S 76°01′20″W

Geography
- Location: Peru, Lima Region, Junín Region
- Parent range: Andes, Pariacaca mountain range

Colquepucro or Collquepucro (possibly from Quechua qullqi money, silver, p'ukru - s. gorge; ravine; gully; hollow; valley) is a mountain in the Pariacaca or Huarochirí mountain range in the Andes of Peru, about 5,658 metres (18,563 ft) high. It is situated in the Junín Region, Jauja Province, Canchayllo District and in the Lima Region, Huarochiri Province, Quinti District. Colquepucro lies north-east of the mountains Corihuasi and Pariacaca.
