= Nor Yauyos-Cochas Landscape Reserve =

Protected area in Peru

Coordinates: 12°02′09″S 75°51′42″W

- Reserva Paisajística Nor Yauyos-Cochas
- IUCN category V (protected landscape/seascape)
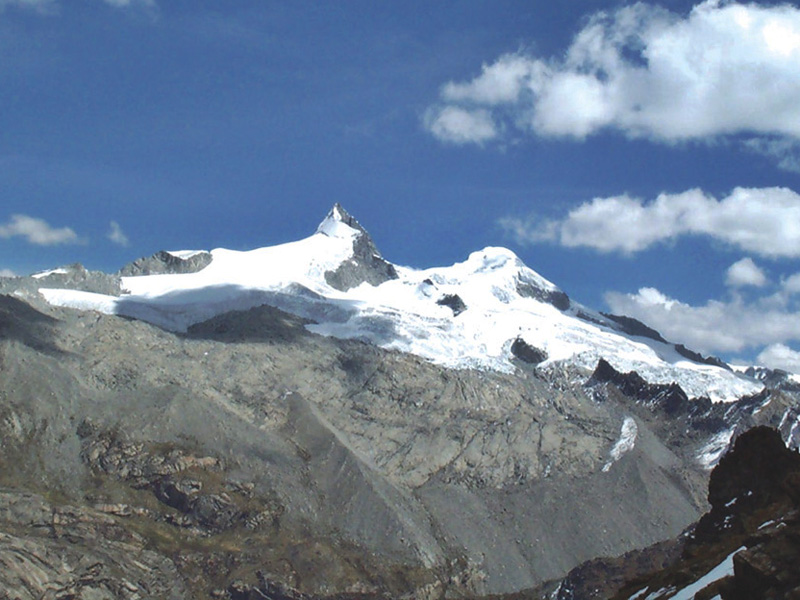
- Pariacaca (5,750 m)
- Location: Peru; Lima Region, Yauyos Province; Junín Region, Jauja Province
- Area: 2,212.68 km^{2} (854.32 mi^{2})
- Established: 2001
- Governing body: SERNANP
- Website: Reserva Paisajística Nor Yauyos-Cochas (in Spanish)

The Nor Yauyos-Cochas Landscape Reserve (Spanish: Reserva Paisajística Nor Yauyos-Cochas) is a protected area in Peru located in the Lima Region, Yauyos Province and in the Junín Region, Jauja Province. It lies with the Peruvian Yungas and Central Andean wet puna ecoregions.

Sima Pumaqucha, one of the deepest caves of South America, and Qaqa Mach'ay, the highest surveyed cave in the world, are situated in the reserve.

== Archaeological sites ==
Some of the archaeological sites within the reserve are Khuchi Mach'ay, Pirqa Pirqa, Quchawasi (Cochashuasi), Qutu Qutu (Coto Coto) and Wamanmarka (Huamanmarca).

== Gallery ==
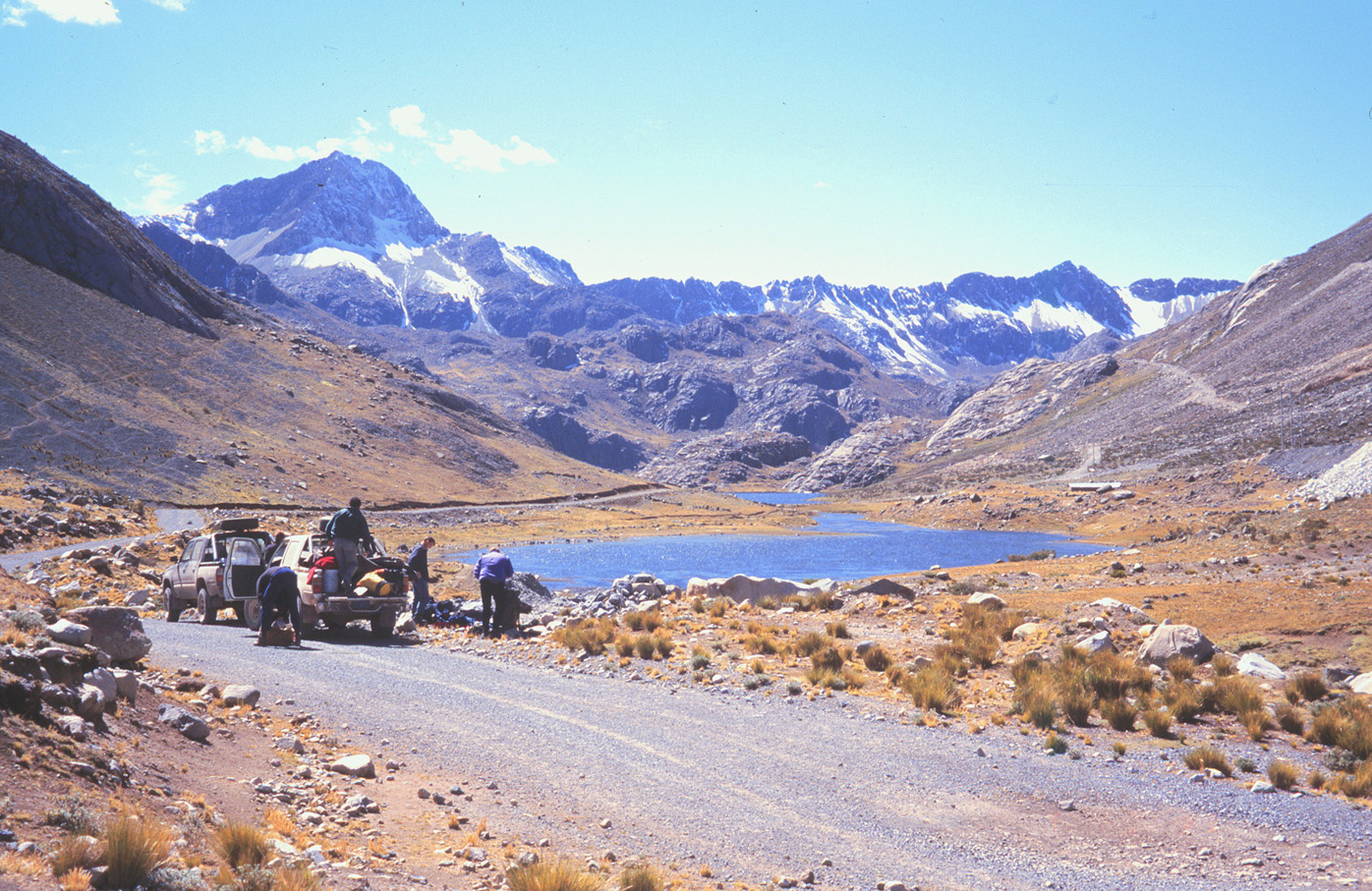
The lake Pumaqucha near the cave Sima Pumaqucha with the mountain León Pitakana (left) in the background

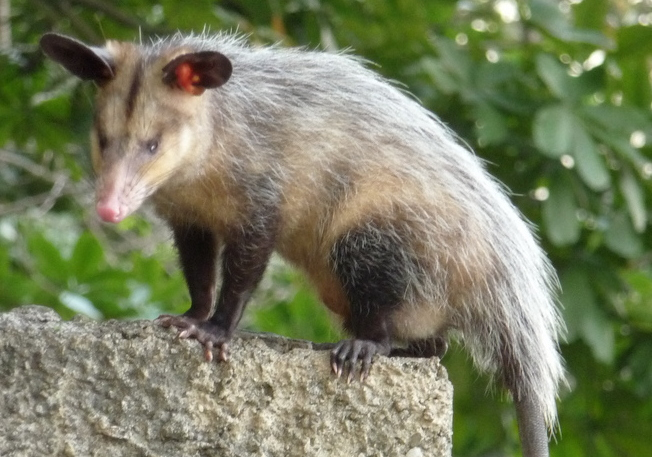
Common opossum

== See also ==
- Paryaqaqa mountain range
- Lake Pumacocha (Lima)
- Lake Cochabamba

== See also ==
- Natural and Cultural Peruvian Heritage
