= Lake Pumacocha (Lima) =

Lake in Peru

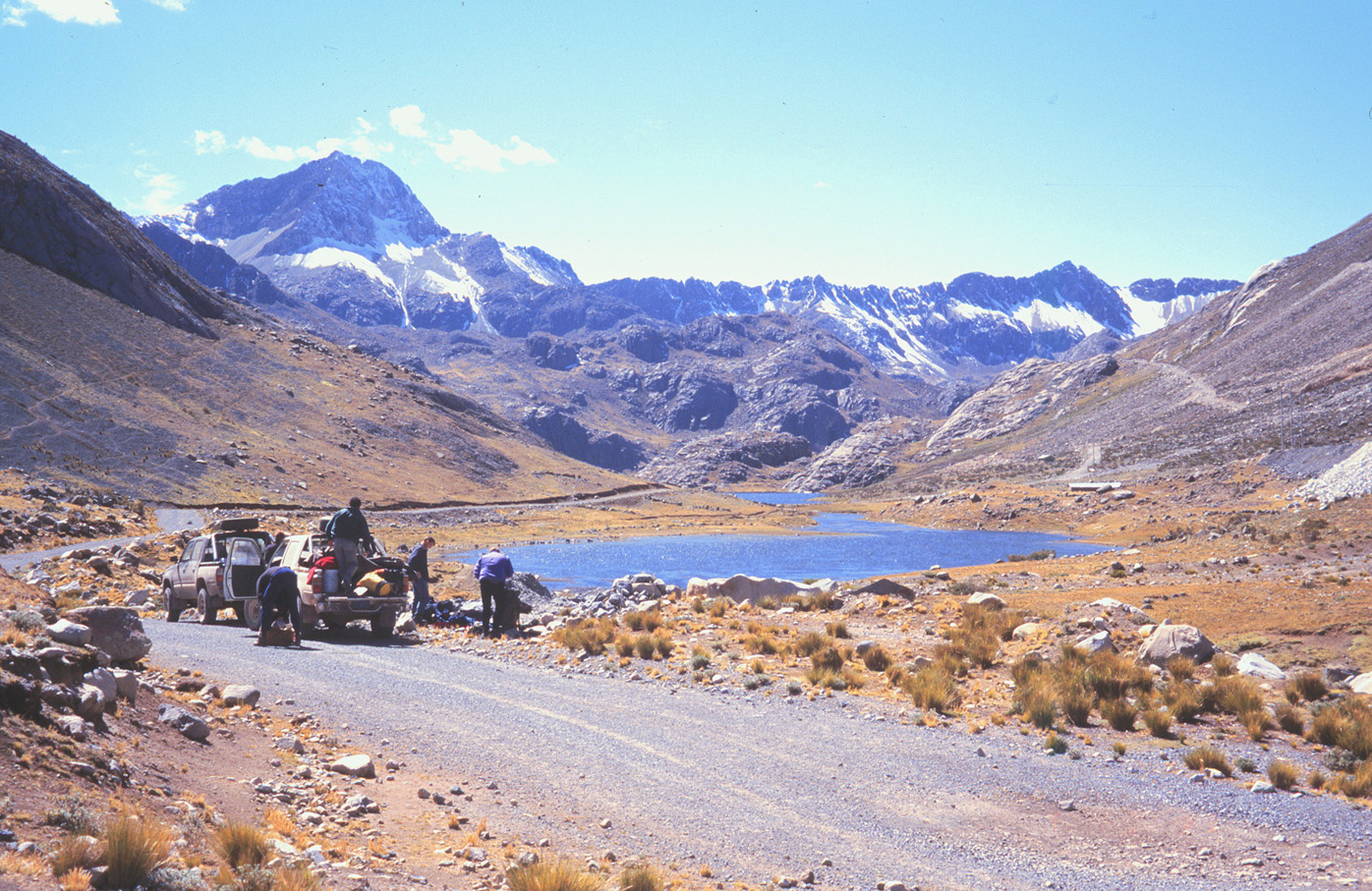
- Explorers at Lake Pumacocha offloading equipment for Sima Pumaqucha.

- Location within Peru
- Location: Lima Region
- Coordinates: 12°23′4.3″S 75°40′33.3″W
- Basin countries: Peru
- Max. length: 2 km (1.2 mi)
- Max. depth: 26 m (85 ft)
- Surface elevation: 4,388 m (14,396 ft)

Lake Pumacocha (possibly from Quechua puma cougar, puma, qucha lake) is a lake in Peru located in Laraos District, Yauyos Province, Lima. It has an elevation of 4,388 m and about 2 km long. Sima Pumaqucha which is considered the deepest cave in the Andes is located near the lake.

== See also ==
- Qaqa Mach'ay
- List of lakes in Peru
