= Pariacaca mountain range =

Mountain range in Peru

- Huarochirí mountain range
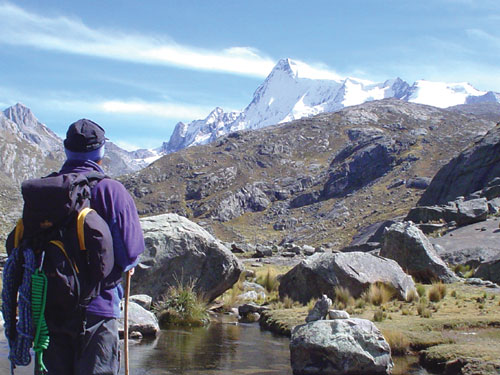
- Pariacaca, south peak

Highest point
- Peak: Pariacaca
- Elevation: 5,750 m (18,860 ft)

Geography
- Country: Peru
- Region(s): Junín Region, Lima Region
- Parent range: Andes

The Pariacaca mountain range (possibly from Quechua parya reddish, sparrow, qaqa rock, Paryaqaqa or Parya Qaqa, a regional deity, a mountain god (apu)), also called Huarochirí mountain range lies in the Andes of Peru. It is located in the Junín Region, in the provinces of Jauja and Yauli, and in the Lima Region, in the provinces of Huarochirí and Yauyos. It is part of the Cordillera Central of Peru.

== Mountains ==
The highest mountain in the range is Pariacaca at 5,750 metres (18,865 ft). Other peaks are listed below:

- Tunshu, 5,660 m (18,570 ft)
- Colquepucro, 5,658 m (18,563 ft)
- Carhuachuco, 5,507 m (18,068 ft)
- Paka, 5,500 m (18,000 ft)
- Suyruqucha, 5,500 m (18,000 ft)
- Huallacancha, 5,500 m (18,000 ft)
- Antachaire, 5,400 m (17,700 ft)
- Nina Ukru, 5,400 m (17,700 ft)
- Pachanqutu, 5,400 m (17,700 ft)
- Paqcha, 5,400 m (17,700 ft)
- Wayllakancha, 5,400 m (17,700 ft)
- Kunkus Yantaq, 5,354 m (17,566 ft)
- Wararayuq, 5,354 m (17,566 ft)
- Tuku Mach'ay, 5,350 m (17,550 ft)
- Putka, 5,300 m (17,400 ft)
- Qayqu, 5,300 m (17,400 ft)
- Tata Qayqu, 5,300 m (17,400 ft)
- Yantayuq, 5,300 m (17,400 ft)
- Chumpi, 5,250 m (17,220 ft)
- Ch'uspi, 5,200 m (17,100 ft)
- Quriwasi, 5,200 m (17,100 ft)
- Uqhu, 5,200 m (17,100 ft)
- Ukhu Qhata, 5,200 m (17,100 ft)
- Wiqu, 5,200 m (17,100 ft)
- Wamanripa, 5,110 m (16,770 ft)
- Kiwyu Waqanan, 5,100 m (16,700 ft)
- Qayqu, 5,100 m (16,700 ft)
- Chhuqu P'ukru, 5,000 m (16,000 ft)
- Parya Chaka, 5,000 m (16,000 ft)
- Kunkus, 5,000 m (16,000 ft)
- Kunkus (Yauli), 5,000 m (16,000 ft)
- Suyuq, 5,000 m (16,000 ft)
- Turiyuq, 5,000 m (16,000 ft)
- Uqsha Wallqa, 5,000 m (16,000 ft)
- Wallapi, 4,800 m (15,700 ft)

== Toponyms ==
Many of the toponyms of the Junín Region and the Lima Region originate from Quechua. Their Spanish-based orthography, however, is in conflict with the normalized alphabet of the language. According to Article 20 of Decreto Supremo No 004-2016-MC (Supreme Decree) which approves the Regulations to Law 29735, published in the official newspaper El Peruano on July 22, 2016, adequate spellings of the toponyms in the normalized alphabets of the indigenous languages must progressively be proposed with the aim of standardizing the namings used by the National Geographic Institute (Instituto Geográfico Nacional, IGN) The National Geographic Institute realizes the necessary changes in the official maps of Peru. The formerly official maps of Peru have been withdrawn from the websites of the IGN.

The recovery and revitalisation of the indigenous languages is also a means to fight discrimination by the use of the language that affects speakers of the native languages in Peru and to promote respectful coexistence in a multicultural and multilingual society (Article 24).
