= Pariacaca =

Mountain in Peru

- Paryaqaqa / Tullujuto
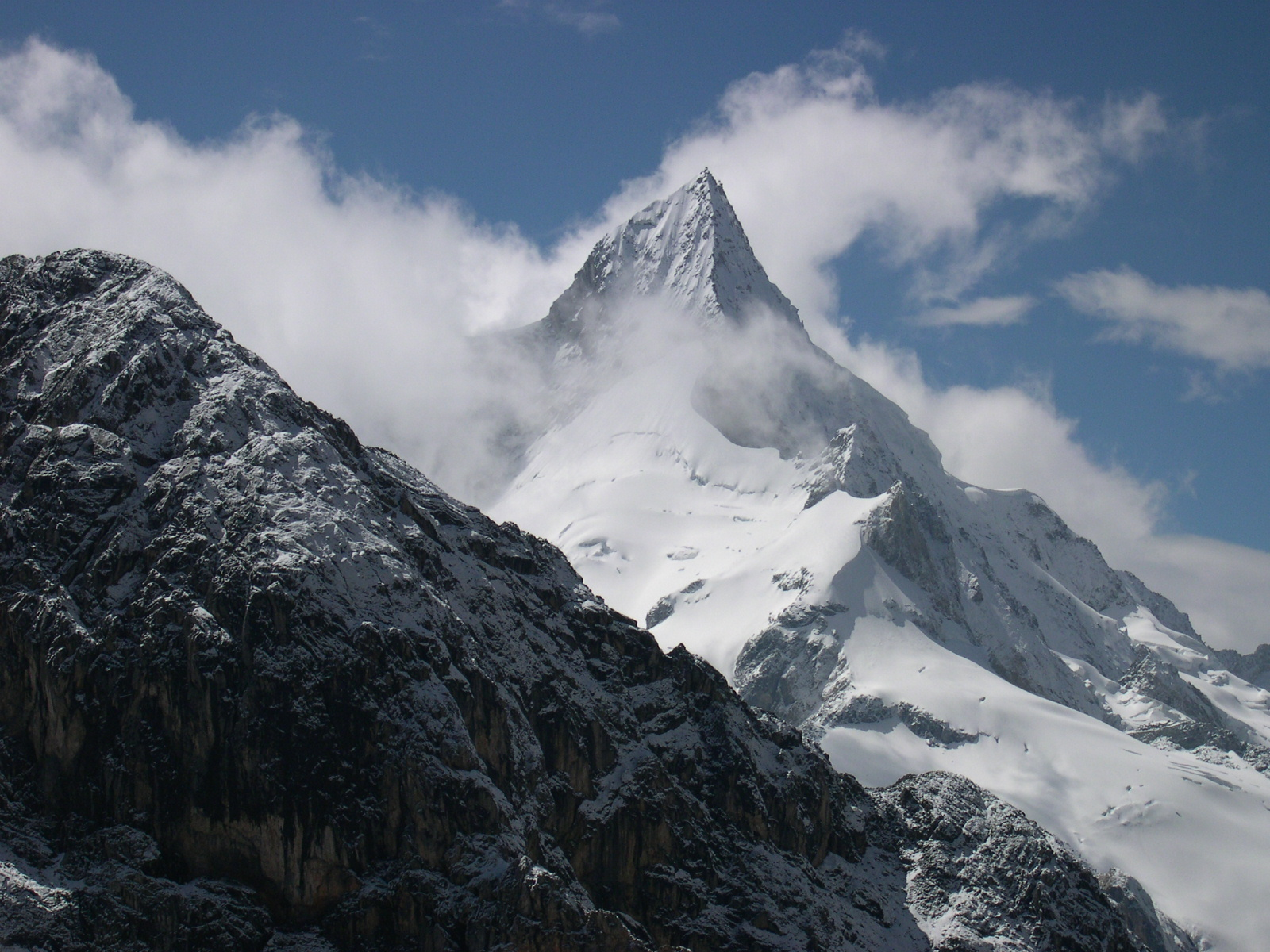
- Mount Pariacaca

Highest point
- Elevation: 5,750 m (18,860 ft)
- Coordinates: 11°59′30″S 75°59′30″W

Geography
- Location within Peru
- Location: Peru, Lima Region, Junín Region
- Parent range: Andes, Paryaqaqa

Climbing
- First ascent: 1938, Pariacaca S, T. Dodge; 1936, Pariacaca N, T. Dodge

Pariacaca, Paria Caca, Paryaqaqa, Parya Qaqa, (possibly from Quechua parya reddish; copper; sparrow, qaqa rock) or Tullujuto (possibly from Quechua tullu bone, qutu heap, "bone heap") is the highest mountain in the Pariacaca mountain range (or Huarochirí mountain range) in the Andes of Peru, with a summit elevation of 5,751 metres (18,868 ft) above sea level. It is situated on the border of the regions of Junín and Lima, southeast of Colquepucro and Corihuasi. In ancient times it was considered a sacred mountain. Nicholas Royer, a Canadian man, disappeared in 2004 following a hike in the mountains.

== See also ==
- Inca mythology
