= Milk Lake =

Milk Lake may refer to:

- Milk Lake, Taiwan, a lake in Taiwan
- Milk Lake (Rainy River District), a lake in Rainy River District, Ontario, Canada
- Milk Lake (Frontenac County), a lake in Frontenac County, Ontario, Canada
- Milk Lake, the lake that occupies the place of the former Milk Lake Glacier in Washington, US
- Milchseen, or "Milk Lakes" within the Spronser Lakes group in South Tyrol, Italy
- Sutgol or "Milk lake" of Turkish mythology
- Lichiqucha, a mountain and lake in the Peruvian Andes
- Lichiqucha (Chicla-Yauli), a mountain and lake in the Peruvian Andes
- Milk Lake Glacier, Washington state, U.S.
- Milk lakes, a term for the milk surplus bought by the EU as a result of its Common Agricultural Policy

== See also ==
- Saumalkol, Kazakhstan
