= Chinchirusa =

Mountain in Peru

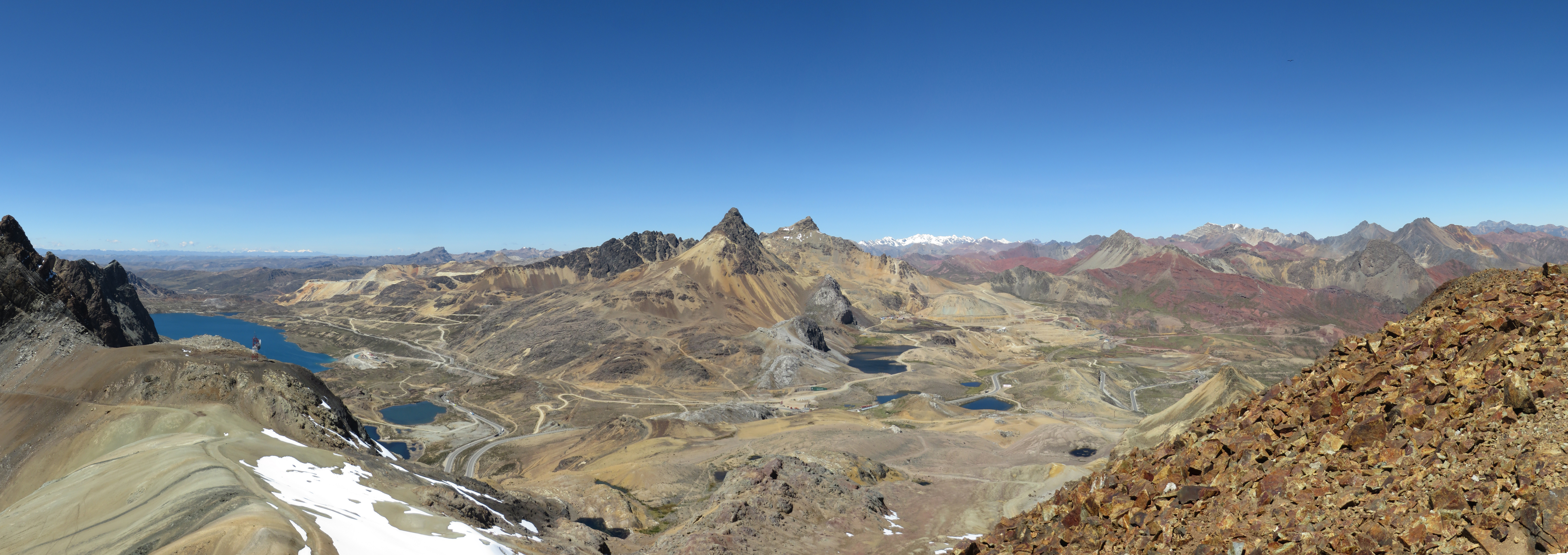
- View from the summit of Yuraqqucha, looking to the southeast. Chinchirusa is visible in front of snow-covered Wayrakancha and Paraqti on the right.

Highest point
- Elevation: 5,000 m (16,000 ft)
- Coordinates: 11°38′06″S 76°11′29″W

Geography
- Location within Peru
- Location: Peru, Junín Region, Lima Region
- Parent range: Andes

Chinchirusa (also spelled Chinchirosa) is a mountain in the Andes of Peru, about 5,000 m (16,404 ft) high. It lies in the Junín Region, Yauli Province, Yauli District, and in the Lima Region, Huarochiri Province, Chicla District. Chinchirusa is situated near the Antikuna mountain pass, west of Tuku Mach'ay, and northeast of Chuqi Chukchu and Paraqti.
