= Paraqti =

Mountain in Peru

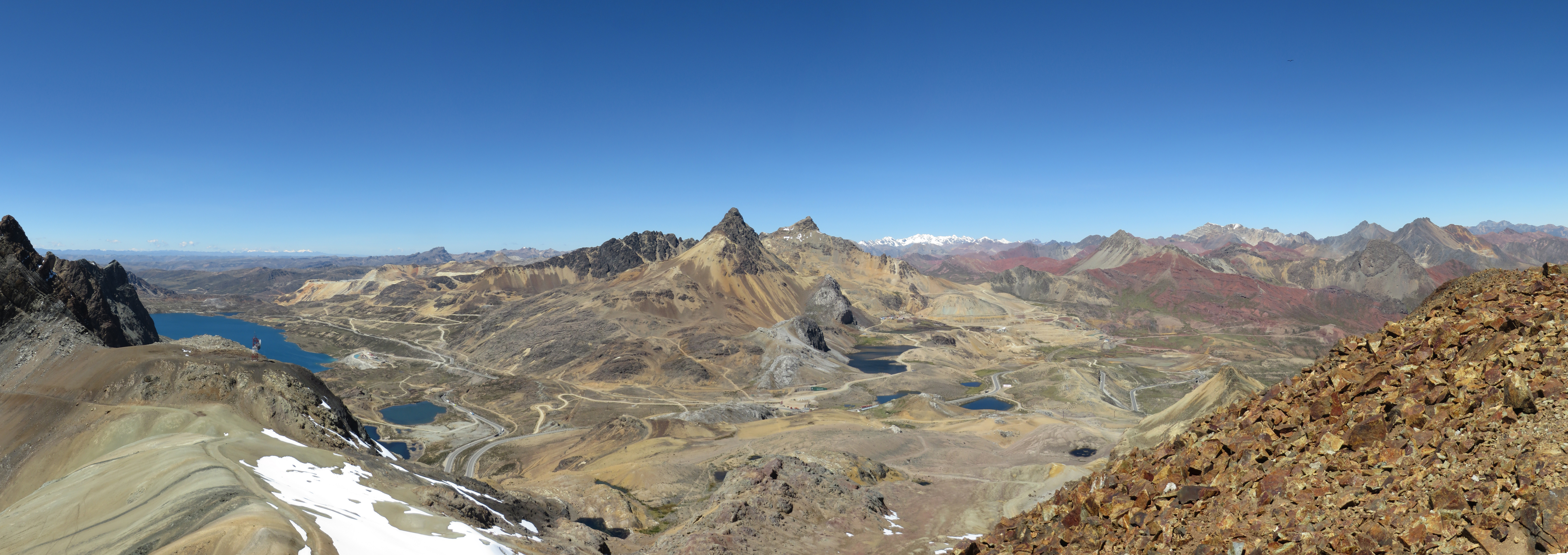
- View from the summit of Yuraqqucha, looking to the southeast. Paraqti is visible in front of snow-covered Wayrakancha on the right.

Highest point
- Elevation: 5,000 m (16,000 ft)
- Coordinates: 11°39′10″S 76°11′54″W

Geography
- Location within Peru
- Location: Peru, Junín Region, Lima Region
- Parent range: Andes, Cordillera Central

Paraqti (Quechua paray to rain, -pti, qti a suffix, "if it rains", Hispanicized spelling Paracte) is a mountain in the Cordillera Central in the Andes of Peru, about 5,000 m (16,404 ft) high. It lies in the Junín Region, Yauli Province, Yauli District, and in the Lima Region, Huarochiri Province, Chicla District. Paraqti is situated near the Antikuna mountain pass, southwest of Tuku Mach'ay and Chinchirusa, and east of Chuqi Chukchu.
