= Lake Acococha =

Lake in the Junín Region, Peru

- Location within Peru
- Location: Peru; Junín Region
- Coordinates: 11°26′24″S 76°16′21″W
- Max. length: 0.73 km (0.45 mi)
- Max. width: 0.28 km (0.17 mi)
- Surface elevation: 4,631 m (15,194 ft)

Lake Acococha (possibly from Quechua aqu sand, qucha lake) is a lake in Peru located in the Junín Region, Yauli Province, Marcapomacocha District. It is situated at a height of about 4,631 metres (15,194 ft), about 0.73 km long and 0.28 km at its widest point. Lake Acococha lies southeast of lakes Marcapomacocha and Marcacocha.
