= Ukhu Qhata =

Mountain in Peru

- Location within Peru

Highest point
- Elevation: 5,200 m (17,100 ft)
- Coordinates: 11°51′56″S 76°1′35″W

Geography
- Location: Peru, Junín Region
- Parent range: Andes, Paryaqaqa

Ukhu Qhata (Quechua ukhu deep, qhata slope, hillside, "deep slope", Hispanicized spelling Ojocata) is a mountain in the Paryaqaqa mountain range in the Andes of Peru, about 5,200 metres (17,060 ft) high. It is situated in the Junín Region, Yauli Province, Suitucancha District. Ukhu Qhata lies south-east of the mountains Putka and Qarwachuku, west of the mountain Wallakancha and north-east of the mountain Wayllakancha.
