= Llaksaqucha (Yauli) =

- Location within Peru
- Location: Peru; Junín Region, Yauli Province
- Coordinates: 11°47′03″S 76°01′20″W
- Basin countries: Peru
- Max. length: 1.12 km (0.70 mi)
- Max. width: 0.56 km (0.35 mi)
- Surface elevation: ca. 4,650 m (15,260 ft)

Llaksaqucha Dam
- Location within Peru
- Country: Peru

Dam and spillways
- Height: 10 m (33 ft)

Power Station
- Operator: Electroperu

Llaksaqucha (Quechua llaksa puna teal (Anas puna); fearful; melting of metals; metal; bronze; a small ceremonial collar, qucha lake, hispanicized spelling Llacsacocha) is a lake in the Paryaqaqa mountain range in the Andes of Peru. It is located in the Junín Region, Yauli Province, Huay-Huay District. It lies northeast of Uqhu and Qayqu. The lake belongs to the watershed of the Mantaro River.

The 10 m (33 ft) high Llaksaqucha dam was erected at the eastern end of the lake at 11°46′58.91″S 76°01′6.019″W. It is operated by Electroperu.
