= Waqraqucha =

Waqraqucha (Quechua waqra horn, qucha lake, "horn lake", also spelled Huaccraccocha, Huacraccocha, Huacracocha, Huajraccocha, Huajracocha, Wacracocha, Wacraccocha) may refer to:

- Waqraqucha (Jauja-Yauli), a mountain at a small lake of that name on the border of the Jauja Province and the Yauli Province, Junín Region, Peru
- Waqraqucha (Junín), a lake in the Morococha District, Yauli Province, Junín Region
- Waqraqucha (Morococha), a lake in the Morococha District, Yauli Province, Junín Region
- Waqraqucha (Suitucancha), a lake in the Suitucancha District, Yauli Province, Junín Region
