= Qullpayuq =

Mountain in Peru

- Location within Peru

Highest point
- Elevation: 4,800 m (15,700 ft)
- Coordinates: 11°18′05″S 76°19′53″W

Geography
- Location: Peru, Junín Region, Yauli Province, Marcapomacocha District
- Parent range: Andes

Qullpayuq (Quechua qullpa salty, saltpeter, -yuq a suffix, "the one with saltpeter", also spelled Culpayo) is a mountain in the Andes of Peru which reaches an altitude of approximately 4,800 metres (15,748 ft). It is located in the Junín Region, Yauli Province, on the border of the districts of Carhuacayán and Marcapomacocha. Qullpayuq lies northwest of the mountain and lake named Muruqucha, north of a lake called Yanaqucha ("black lake").
