= Llawa P'ukru =

Mountain in Peru

- Location within Peru

Highest point
- Elevation: 5,200 m (17,100 ft)
- Coordinates: 11°35′50″S 76°16′12″W

Geography
- Location: Peru, Lima Region
- Parent range: Andes

Llawa P'ukru (Quechua llawa broken glass with sharp edges, p'ukru hole, pit, gap in a surface, Hispanicized spelling Llaguapucro) is a mountain in the Andes of Peru, about 5,200 m (17,060 ft) high. It is situated in the Lima Region, Huarochirí Province, Chicla District. Llawa P'ukru lies southwest of Sillaqaqa and Inka Kancha, east of Qunchupata and southeast of Quriqucha.
