= Uqhu =

Uqhu may refer to:

- Uqhu (Lima), a mountain in Lima Region, Peru
- Uqhu (Marcapomacocha), a mountain in Marcapomacocha District, Peru
- Uqhu (Yauli), a mountain in Yauli District, Peru
