= Lake Pucrococha =

Lake in Peru

- Location within Peru
- Location: Junín Region, Yauli Province, Suitucancha District
- Coordinates: 11°29′38″S 76°19′7″W
- Basin countries: Peru

Lake Pucrococha (possibly from Quechua p'ukru gorge, ravine, gully, hollow, valley, qucha lake, lagoon) is a lake in Peru located in the Junín Region, Yauli Province, Marcapomacocha District. It lies south-east of Lake Marcapomacocha.
