= Morococha =

Former town in Peru

- Town
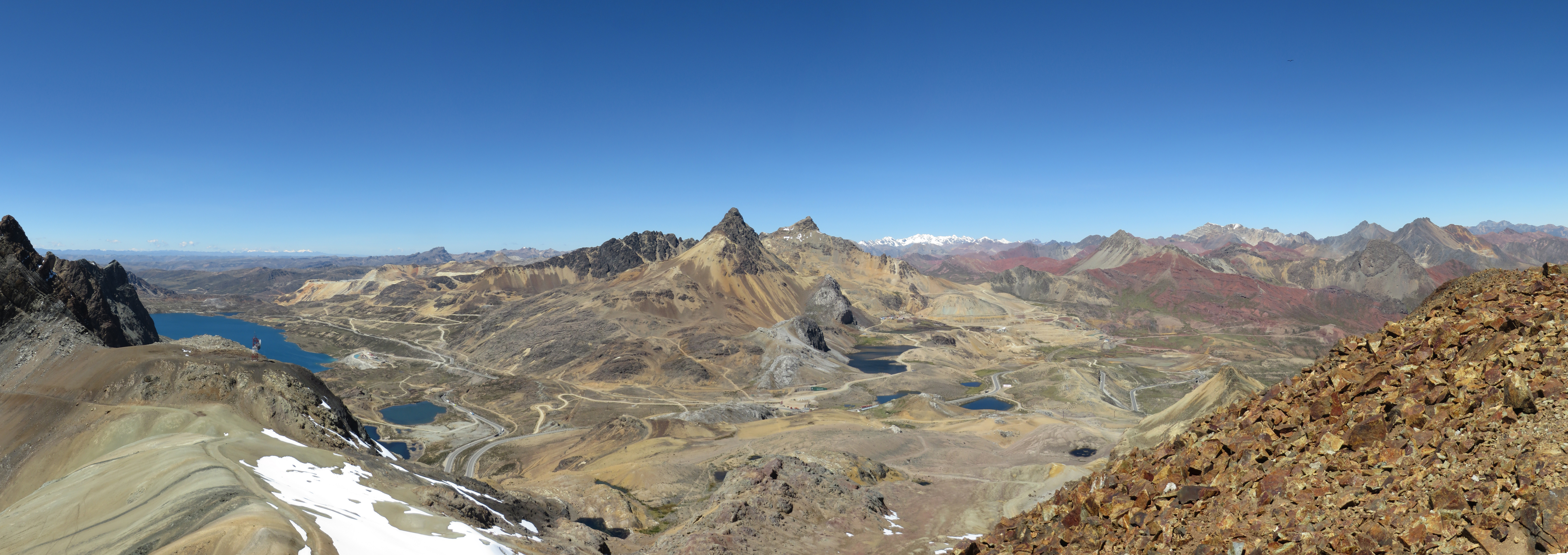
- Huacracocha (the largest lake on the left) as seen from Yuraqqucha

- Location within Peru
- Coordinates: 11°36′40.72″S 76°8′21.25″W
- Country: Peru
- Department: Junín
- Province: Yauli
- District: Morococha
- Elevation: 4,540 m (14,900 ft)
- Time zone: UTC-5 (PET)
- Website: munimorococha.gob.pe

Morococha (Quechua: Muruqucha) is a former town in Junín, a department of Peru. From 2013 to 2025, its population and administrative functions were gradually transferred to Nueva Morococha, a planned community built about 6 miles away for the town's displaced residents.

== History ==
Located near La Oroya, Morococha was established in the early 20th century in an area of Junín dedicated to the country's mineral industry.

Morococha was famous for hosting the most high-mountainous railroad in the world, a branch the Lima-Huancayo railway, which passes at the height of 4,818–5,000 metres (15,807–16,404 ft) above sea level. This record was held until 2005, when a line of the Qinghai–Tibet railway was built. Similarly, it once housed the Tuctu Golf Club, also the highest in the world.

=== Transfer ===
Morococha served as the political capital of the district of the same name until 2013, when it was replaced by Nueva Morococha.

In 2013, Morococha was the site of Toromocho, a planned open pit copper mine to be operated by Chinalco, a Chinese firm. A new town for the 5,000 residents of Morococha was built about 6 miles away, but some residents were reported to be resisting location. The mine is projected to produce about 250,000 tons of copper a year for about 35 years.

The town's last remnants were demolished on September 19, 2025.

== See also ==
- Mineral industry of Peru
