= Huallacancha =

Mountain in Peru

- Location within Peru

Highest point
- Elevation: 5,500 m (18,000 ft)
- Coordinates: 11°52′12″S 76°2′40″W

Geography
- Location: Peru, Junín Region
- Parent range: Andes, Pariacaca

Huallacancha or Huallacanecha (possibly from Quechua walla mountain range, kancha enclosure, enclosed place, yard, a frame, or wall that encloses) is a mountain in the Pariacaca mountain range in the Andes of Peru, about 5,500 metres (18,045 ft) high. It is situated in the Junín Region, Yauli Province, on the border of the districts Suitucancha and Yauli. Huallacancha lies south-east of the mountain Qarwachuku, west of the mountain Ukhu Qhata and north of the mountain Wayllakancha.

Huallacancha is also the name of a valley with an intermittent stream which originates on the east side of the mountain. Its waters flow to the north-east where they meet Mantaro River.
