= Chhuqu P'ukru =

Mountain in Peru

- Location within Peru

Highest point
- Elevation: 5,000 m (16,000 ft)
- Coordinates: 11°46′36″S 76°02′20″W

Geography
- Location: Peru, Junín Region
- Parent range: Andes, Paryaqaqa

Chhuqu P'ukru (Quechua chhuqu narrow; rectangular, p'ukru hole, pit, gap in a surface, "narrow gap", hispanicized spelling Chujupucro) is a mountain in the northern part of the Paryaqaqa mountain range in the Andes of Peru which reaches an altitude of approximately 5,000 metres (16,404 ft). It is located in the Junín Region, Yauli Province, in the districts of Huay-Huay and Suitucancha. Chhuqu P'ukru lies between Chumpi in the north and Qayqu in the south.
