= Yantayuq =

Mountain in Peru

- Shallanqa
- Location within Peru

Highest point
- Elevation: 5,300 m (17,400 ft)
- Coordinates: 11°50′04″S 76°03′25″W

Geography
- Location: Peru, Junín Region
- Parent range: Andes, Paryaqaqa

Yantayuq (Quechua llam'a, llant'a, yanta firewood, -yuq a suffix, "the one with firewood", also spelled Yantayo), also known as Shallanqa (Hispanicized spelling Shallanca), is a mountain in the Paryaqaqa mountain range in the Andes of Peru which reaches an altitude of approximately 5,300 metres (17,388 ft). It is located in the Junín Region, Yauli Province, in the districts of Suitucancha and Yauli. Yantayuq lies southwest of Putka and north of Qarwachuku.

Yantayuq is also the name of a small lake northwest of the mountain in the Yauli District at 11°49′27″S 76°03′52″W
