= Nueva Morococha =

City in Peru

- Populated centre
- Location within Peru
- Coordinates: 11°35′15.69″S 76°3′40.49″W
- Country: Peru
- Department: Junín
- Province: Yauli
- District: Morococha
- Established: 2012

Area
  - Total: 0.102 km^{2} (0.039 sq mi)
- Elevation: 4,240 m (13,910 ft)
- Time zone: UTC-5 (PET)
- Website: munimorococha.gob.pe

Nueva Morococha is a populated centre in Junín, a department of Peru. Built in 2012 by the Aluminum Corporation of China (Chinalco), it functions as the political capital of the district of the same name.

The settlement was planned and built over a 26-month period by Chinalco to house the residents of neighbouring Morococha, displaced to make way for an open-air mine at Mount Toromocho, also owned by Chinalco.

== History ==
The settlement was built by the Aluminum Corporation of China (Chinalco) over a 26-month period to house residents of neighbouring Morococha, a village located 6 miles away, near La Oroya. The settlement was conceived as a new location for the soon-to-be displaced residents, as Morococha's land would make way for Toromocho open-air mine, owned by Chinalco and located adjacent to the town. It replaced Morococha as the political capital of the district of the same name in 2013.

== Politics ==
Nueva Morococha is under the jurisdiction of its own district municipality, headed by a mayor.

As of 2026, the incumbent mayor is Roberto Cornelio Flores.

== Demographics ==
The town's population is numbered at over 1,000 families. The town features 1,050 houses and 30 public features.

== See also ==
- Mineral industry of Peru
