= Yana Wachuku =

Mountain in Peru

- Location within Peru

Highest point
- Elevation: 5,012 m (16,444 ft)
- Coordinates: 11°18′58″S 76°25′26″W

Geography
- Location: Peru, Junín Region
- Parent range: Andes

Yana Wachuku (Quechua yana black, Ancash Quechua wachuku big belt, girdle, "black belt" or "black girdle", Hispanicized spelling Yanahuachuco) is a 5,012-metre-high (16,444 ft) mountain in the Andes of Peru. It is located in the Junín Region, Yauli Province, on the border of the districts of Carhuacayan and Marcapomacocha. It lies southeast of Allqay.
