= Waman Marka =

Waman Marka (Quechua waman falcon, marka village, also spelled Huaman Marca, Huamanmarca, Huamanmarka, Wamanmarca) may refer to:

- Waman Marka (Junín), a mountain in the Marcapomacocha District, Yauli Province, Junín Region, Peru
- Waman Marka (La Oroya), a mountain in the La Oroya District, Yauli Province, Junín Region, Peru
- Wamanmarka, Chumbivilcas, an archaeological site in the Chumbivilcas Province, Cusco Region, Peru
- Wamanmarka, La Convención, an archaeological site in the La Convención Province, Cusco Region, Peru
- Wamanmarka, Lima, an archaeological site in the Lima Region, Peru
