= Coipapite =

Mountain in Peru

- Location within Peru

Highest point
- Elevation: 4,800 m (15,700 ft)
- Coordinates: 11°28′00″S 76°22′23″W

Geography
- Location: Peru, Junín Region, Lima Region
- Parent range: Andes

Coipapite (possibly from Quechua qullpa saltpeter, p'iti dividing by pulling powerfully to the extremes; gap, interruption) is a mountain in the Andes of Peru which reaches an altitude of approximately 4,800 metres (15,748 ft). It is located in the Junín Region, Yauli Province, Marcapomacocha District, and in the Lima Region Canta Province, Huaros District. It lies at the Quri Wayi valley, southeast of a lake named Marcapomacocha.

Culpa Piti is also the name of an unpopulated place in the Quri Wayi valley northeast of the mountain.
