= Challwaqucha (Yauli) =

Mountain in Peru

- Location within Peru

Highest point
- Elevation: 5,000 m (16,000 ft)
- Coordinates: 11°30′43″S 76°08′09″W

Geography
- Location: Peru, Junín Region, Yauli Province
- Parent range: Andes

Challwaqucha (Quechua challwa 'fish', qucha 'lake', "fish lake", Hispanicized spelling Chalhuacocha) is a mountain in the Andes of Peru, about 5,000 metres (16,404 ft) high, with a small lake of the same name. It is located in the Junín Region, Yauli Province, Morococha District, southwest of Yawarqucha and Yuraqqucha.

The mountain is named after a little lake on its western slope at 11°30′50″S 76°08′23″W.
