= Marayniyuq =

Marayniyuq (Quechua maran, maray batan or grindstone, maray to tear down, to knock down, -ni, -yuq suffixes, "the one with the grind stone", also spelled Marainioc, Marainioj, Marainiyoq, Marainiyoc, Maraynioc, Maraynioj, Marayniyoc, Marayniyocc, Marayniyoj, Marayniyoq) may refer to:

- Marayniyuq, Ayacucho, an archaeological site in the Ayacucho Region, Peru
- Marayniyuq (Junín), a mountain in the Yauli Province, Junín Region, Peru
- Marayniyuq (Yauyos), a mountain in the Yauyos Province, Lima Region, Peru
