= Killa Wañunan =

Mountain in Peru

- Location within Peru

Highest point
- Elevation: 5,029 m (16,499 ft)
- Coordinates: 11°37′48″S 76°07′51″W

Geography
- Location: Peru, Junín Region
- Parent range: Andes

Killa Wañunan (Quechua killa moon, wañuy to die, -na a suffix, meaning "where the moon dies", -n a suffix, Hispanicized spelling Quillahuañunan) is a 5,029-metre-high (16,499 ft) mountain in the Andes of Peru. It lies in the Junín Region, Yauli Province, Yauli District. Killa Wañunan is situated southeast of the Antikuna mountain pass and the lake named Waqraqucha, and east of Tuku Mach'ay.
