= Mit'u =

Mountain in Peru

- Location within Peru

Highest point
- Elevation: 5,000 m (16,000 ft)
- Coordinates: 11°32′08″S 76°10′01″W

Geography
- Location: Peru, Junín Region, Yauli Province
- Parent range: Andes

Mit'u (Quechua for mud, Hispanicized spelling Mito) is a mountain in the Andes of Peru which reaches an altitude of approximately 5,000 metres (16,404 ft). It is located in the Junín Region, Yauli Province, Morococha District, north of Shawaq. Mit'u lies south of the Puka Yaku River ("red water", Hispanicized Pucayacu), an affluent of the Mantaro River.
