= Kiwyu Waqanan =

Mountain in Peru

- Location within Peru

Highest point
- Elevation: 5,100 m (16,700 ft)
- Coordinates: 11°42′24″S 76°01′06″W

Geography
- Location: Peru, Junín Region
- Parent range: Andes, Paryaqaqa

Kiwyu Waqanan (Jaqaru kiwyu a kind of partridges, Quechua waqay crying, to cry, -na a suffix, "where the partridge cries", Hispanicized spelling Quiviohuaganan) is a mountain in the northern part of the Paryaqaqa mountain range in the Andes of Peru which reaches an altitude of approximately 5,100 metres (16,732 ft). It is located in the Junín Region, Yauli Province, in the districts of Huay-Huay and Yauli. Kiwyu Waqanan lies northeast of Chumpi.
