= Yanta Pallana =

Mountain in Peru

- Location within Peru

Highest point
- Elevation: 4,800 m (15,700 ft)
- Coordinates: 11°45′42″S 76°07′56″W

Geography
- Location: Peru, Junín Region
- Parent range: Andes, Cordillera Central

Yanta Pallana (Quechua llamt'a, llant'a, yanta firewood, pallay to collect, -na a suffix, "a place to collect firewood", also spelled Yantapallana) is a mountain in the Cordillera Central in the Andes of Peru which reaches an altitude of approximately 4,800 metres (15,748 ft). It is located in the Junín Region, Yauli Province, Yauli District. Yanta Pallana lies west of Wamanripa, south of a lake named Pumaqucha.
