= Wamanripa (Junín) =

Mountain in the Andes of Peru

- Location within Peru

Highest point
- Elevation: 5,000 m (16,000 ft)
- Coordinates: 11°45′40″S 76°06′58″W

Geography
- Location: Peru, Junín Region
- Parent range: Andes, Cordillera Central

Wamanripa (Quechua wamanripa Senecio, "the one with the wamanripa", hispanicized spelling Huamanrripa) is a mountain in the Cordillera Central in the Andes of Peru which reaches an altitude of approximately 5,000 metres (16,404 ft). It is located in the Junín Region, Yauli Province, Yauli District. Wamanripa lies east of Yanta Pallana and south of a lake named Pumaqucha.
