= Kunkus =

Mountain in Peru

- Location within Peru

Highest point
- Elevation: 5,000 m (16,000 ft)
- Coordinates: 11°43′03″S 76°02′41″W

Geography
- Location: Peru, Junín Region, Yauli Province, Huay-Huay District, Yauli District
- Parent range: Andes, Paryaqaqa

Kunkus (Ancash Quechua kunkush Puya raimondii, Hispanicized spelling Cuncus) is a mountain in the north of the Paryaqaqa mountain range in the Andes of Peru which reaches an altitude of approximately 5,000 m (16,000 ft). It is located in the Junín Region, Yauli Province, on the border of the districts of Huay-Huay and Yauli. Kunkus lies north of Chumpi.
