= Quchayuq (Yauli) =

Mountain in Peru

- Location within Peru

Highest point
- Elevation: 4,600 m (15,100 ft)
- Coordinates: 11°29′24″S 76°06′15″W

Geography
- Location: Peru, Junín Region
- Parent range: Andes

Quchayuq (Quechua qucha lake, -yuq a suffix, "the one with a lake (or lakes)", also spelled Cuchayoc) is a mountain in Peru which reaches a height of approximately 4,600 m (15,100 ft). It is located in the Junín Region, Yauli Province, Morococha District. Quchayuq lies northeast of a mountain and a lake named Yuraqqucha (Quechua for "white lake").
