= Uqhu (Marcapomacocha) =

Mountain in Peru

- Location within Peru

Highest point
- Elevation: 5,100 m (16,700 ft)
- Coordinates: 11°31′21″S 76°14′47″W

Geography
- Location: Peru, Junín Region
- Parent range: Andes

Uqhu (Quechua for swamp, Hispanicized spelling Uco) or Ukhu (Quechua for deep) is a mountain in the Andes of Peru, about 5,100 metres (16,732 ft) high. It is located in the Junín Region, Yauli Province, Marcapomacocha District. Uqhu lies northwest of Yuraqqucha and Pukaqucha. It is situated northeast of a plain called Pampa Uqhu ("swamp plain", Hispanicized Pampa Uco). Uqhu is also the name of the little lake west of the mountain.
