= Anta Q'asa =

Mountain in Peru

- Location within Peru

Highest point
- Elevation: 5,000 m (16,000 ft)
- Coordinates: 11°34′11″S 76°15′18″W

Geography
- Location: Peru, Lima Region, Junín Region
- Parent range: Andes

Anta Q'asa (Quechua anta copper, q'asa mountain pass, "copper mountain pass", Hispanicized spelling Antaccasa, Antajasa) is a mountain in the Andes of Peru, about 5,000 metres (16,404 ft) high. It is situated in the Junín Region, Yauli Province, Marcapomacocha District, and in the Lima Region, Huarochirí Province, Chicla District. Anta Q'asa lies southwest of the mountain Pukaqucha, west of the mountains Yuraqqucha and Sillaqaqa, northeast of Llawa P'ukru and east of the mountain Quriqucha.
