= Waqraqucha (Suitucancha) =

Lake in Junín Region, Peru

- Location within Peru
- Location: Junín Region, Yauli Province, Suitucancha District
- Coordinates: 11°51′15″S 75°55′8″W
- Basin countries: Peru

Waqraqucha (Quechua waqra horn, qucha lake, lagoon, "horn lake", hispanicized spelling Huacracocha) is a lake in Peru located in the Junín Region, Yauli Province, Suitucancha District. It is situated east of the Paryaqaqa or Waruchiri mountain range. Waqraqucha lies north of a lake named Wayllakancha (Huaylacancha) and the smaller lakes called Antaqucha (Antacocha), Wirukancha (Huirocancha) and Llaksaqucha (Yacsacocha).
