= Waman Marka (Junín) =

Mountain in Peru

- Location within Peru

Highest point
- Elevation: 5,000 m (16,000 ft)
- Coordinates: 11°22′30″S 76°19′09″W

Geography
- Location: Peru, Junín Region
- Parent range: Andes

Waman Marka (Quechua waman falcon, marka village, Hispanicized spelling Huaman Marca) is a mountain in the Andes of Peru which reaches an altitude of approximately 5,000 metres (16,404 ft). It is located in the Junín Region, Yauli Province, Marcapomacocha District. It lies south of Mishipa Ñawin, northeast of a lake named Markapumaqucha.
