= Ch'uyku =

Mountain in Peru

- Location within Peru

Highest point
- Elevation: 5,000 m (16,000 ft)
- Coordinates: 11°27′04″S 76°20′17″W

Geography
- Location: Peru, Junín Region
- Parent range: Andes

Ch'uyku (Quechua for a narrow and twisted opening, hispanicized spelling Chuigo) is a mountain in the Andes of Peru which reaches an altitude of approximately 5,000 metres (16,404 ft). It is located in the Junín Region, Yauli Province, Marcapomacocha District. It lies south of a lake named Markapumaqucha.
