= Qullqi Mach'ay =

Mountain in Peru

- Location within Peru

Highest point
- Elevation: 4,600 m (15,100 ft)
- Coordinates: 11°07′53″S 76°26′23″W

Geography
- Location: Peru, Junín Region
- Parent range: Andes

Qullqi Mach'ay (Quechua qullqi silver, mach'ay cave, "silver cave", hispanicized spelling Culquimachay) is a mountain in the Andes of Peru which reaches an altitude of approximately 4,600 metres (15,092 ft). It is located in the Junín Region, Yauli Province, Carhuacayan District. Qullqi Mach'ay lies southwest of the lake named Waskhaqucha.
