= Yauli District, Yauli =

Yauli
- District
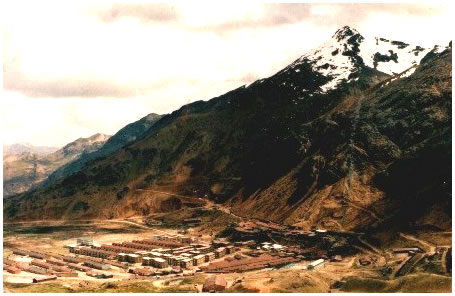
- The mining town of San Cristóbal
- Interactive map of Yauli
- Coordinates: 11°40′10″S 76°5′23″W
- Country: Peru
- Region: Junín
- Province: Yauli
- Capital: Yauli

Government
  - Mayor: Vicente Zenon Hidalgo Hidalgo

Area
  - Total: 424.16 km^{2} (163.77 sq mi)
- Elevation: 4,100 m (13,500 ft)

Population (2005 census)
  - Total: 5,025
  - Density: 11.85/km^{2} (30.68/sq mi)
- Time zone: UTC-5 (PET)
- UBIGEO: 120810

Yauli District is one of ten districts of the Yauli Province, located in the Department of Junín in the central highlands of Peru. The district was created by the Law No. 6468 in November 7, 1847, during the presidency of Ramón Castilla.

== Geography ==
The Paryaqaqa of Waruchiri mountain range traverses the district. Some of the highest mountains of the district are listed below:

- Allqa
- Allqa Ranra
- Chinchirusa
- Chumpi
- Killa Wañunan
- Kiwyu Waqanan
- Kunkus
- Kunkus (Yauli)
- Kuntur Mach'ay
- Lichiqucha
- Ñuñu
- Paqush
- Paraqti
- Putka
- Qarwachuku
- Qayqu
- Quri
- Ranra
- Shira
- Tuku Mach'ay
- Uqhu
- Wallakancha
- Wamanripa
- Wayllakancha
- Wayrakancha
- Yanta Pallana
- Yantayuq
- Yuraq Anka

== See also ==
- Pumaqucha
