= Marayniyuq (Junín) =

Mountain in Peru

- Location within Peru

Highest point
- Elevation: 4,800 m (15,700 ft)
- Coordinates: 11°19′59″S 76°19′20″W

Geography
- Location: Peru, Junín Region
- Parent range: Andes

Marayniyuq (Quechua maran, maray batan or grindstone, maray to tear down, to knock down, -ni, -yuq suffixes, "the one with the grind stone", also spelled Maraynioc) is a mountain in the Andes of Peru, about 4,800 m (15,700 ft) high . It is located in the Junín Region, Yauli Province, Marcapomacocha District. It lies north of Mishipa Ñawin.
