= Waskhaqucha (Morococha) =

- Location within Peru
- Location: Junín Region, Yauli Province, Morococha District
- Coordinates: 11°35′38″S 76°05′58″W
- Basin countries: Peru

Waskhaqucha Dam
- Location within Peru
- Country: Peru

Dam and spillways
- Height: 10 m (33 ft)
- Length: 183 m (600 ft)

Reservoir
- Total capacity: 9,200,000 m^{3} (7,500 acre⋅ft)

Power Station
- Operator: Centromín Perú

Waskhaqucha (Quechua waskha (also waska) rope, qucha lake, hispanicized spelling Huascacocha, also Huascocha, a broken word) is a lake in Peru located in the Junín Region, Yauli Province, Morococha District. It lies east of a lake named Waqraqucha.

The Waskhaqucha dam was erected in 1914. It is 183 m (600 ft) long and 10 m (11 yd) high. It is operated by Centromín Perú. The reservoir has a volume of 28,000 m^{3} (23 acre⋅ft) and a capacity of 9,200,000 m^{3} (7,500 acre⋅ft).

== See also ==
- List of lakes in Peru
