= Qayqu (Junín) =

Mountain in Peru

- Location within Peru

Highest point
- Elevation: 5,300 m (17,400 ft)
- Coordinates: 11°48′16″S 76°02′36″W

Geography
- Location: Peru, Junín Region
- Parent range: Andes, Paryaqaqa

Qayqu (Quechua for a type of hunt, hispanicized spelling Jaico) is a mountain in the Paryaqaqa mountain range in the Andes of Peru, about 5,300 m (17,400 ft) high. It is situated in the Junín Region, Yauli Province, on the border of the districts of Suitucancha and Yauli. Qayqu lies north of Putka and southeast of Uqhu.
