= Puka Rumi (Junín) =

Mountain in Peru

- Location within Peru

Highest point
- Elevation: 5,028 m (16,496 ft)
- Coordinates: 11°28′55″S 76°20′59″W

Geography
- Location: Peru, Junín Region
- Parent range: Andes

Puka Rumi (Quechua puka red, rumi stone, "red stone", Hispanicized spelling Puca Rumi) is a 5,028-metre-high (16,496 ft) mountain in the Andes of Peru. It is located in the Junín Region, Yauli Province, Marcapomacocha District. It lies northwest of Chunta and Kashpi.
