= Qunchupata (Junín-Lima) =

Mountain in Peru

- Location within Peru

Highest point
- Elevation: 5,100 m (16,700 ft)
- Coordinates: 11°35′28″S 76°17′16″W

Geography
- Location: Peru, Junín Region, Lima Region
- Parent range: Andes

Qunchupata (Quechua qunchu muddy, pata step, bank of a river, "muddy step" or "muddy bank", Hispanicized spelling Conchupata) is a mountain in the Andes of Peru, about 5,100 metres (16,732 ft) high. It is located in the Junín Region, Yauli Province, Marcapomacocha District, and in the Lima Region, Huarochirí Province, Chicla District. Qunchupata lies southwest of Anta Q'asa and Quriqucha and southeast of Yana Ulla. It is situated north of the Hatun Uqhu valley (Quechua for "big swamp", Hispanicized Jatun Ogo).
