= Tuctu Golf Club =

Golf course in Morococha, Peru

Club information
- Location: Morococha, Peru
- Tota holes: 9

The Tuctu Golf Club was a golf course located in Morococha, Peru. During operation, it was the highest golf course in the world. The course was located at an elevation of 14,335 feet (4,369 m) at its lowest point. As late as 1993, it held the world record for the highest golf club. The course was abandoned in the mid-1990s and is said to be unrecognizable today, as it is overgrown with weeds and grasses. Today, the land is owned by a mining company. At 14,000 feet, it was also known for inducing nosebleeds among the golfers.
