= Yanque =

Mountain in Peru

- Location within Peru

Highest point
- Elevation: 5,205 m (17,077 ft)
- Coordinates: 11°16′11″S 76°27′29″W

Geography
- Location: Peru, Junín Region
- Parent range: Andes

Yanque (possibly from Quechua for clay, Yanki means "exchange" or "North American" in Quechua) is a 5,205-metre-high (17,077 ft) mountain in the Andes of Peru. It is located in the Junín Region, Yauli Province, Carhuacayan District, and in the Lima Region, Huaral Province, Atavillos Alto District. It lies southwest of Tuctococha and northeast of the peak of Alcay.

Yanque is also the name of a lake southeast of the mountain at 11°16′50″S 76°27′11″W. The little lake west of the mountain is named Isco (possibly from Aymara and Quechua for lime).
