= Puka Mach'ay (Junín) =

Mountain in Peru

- Location within Peru

Highest point
- Elevation: 4,600 m (15,100 ft)
- Coordinates: 11°29′56″S 76°05′12″W

Geography
- Location: Peru, Junín Region
- Parent range: Andes

Puka Mach'ay (Quechua puka red, mach'ay cave, "red cave", also spelled Pucamachay) is a mountain in Peru which reaches a height of approximately 4,600 m (15,100 ft). It is located in the Junín Region, Yauli Province, Morococha District.
