= Puwaq Hanka =

Mountain in Peru

- Location within Peru

Highest point
- Elevation: 5,100 m (16,700 ft)
- Coordinates: 11°10′00″S 76°31′06″W

Geography
- Location: Peru, Lima Region
- Parent range: Andes, Puwaq Hanka

Puwaq Hanka (local Quechua puwaq, eight, hanka snowcapped peak or ridge, "eight peaks (or ridges)", hispanicized spelling Puagjanca) is a mountain in the Puwaq Hanka mountain range in the Andes of Peru, about 5,100 m (16,732 ft) high. It is located in the Lima Region, Huaral Province, Andamarca District.
