= Saumalkol =

Saumalkol (Kazakh: Саумалкөл; "milky lake") may refer to:

- Saumalkol (Karasor Basin), a lake in northwestern Karkaraly District, Karaganda Region, Kazakhstan
- Saumalkol, N Karkaraly District, a lake in northern Karkaraly District, Karaganda Region, Kazakhstan
- Saumalkol, Bukhar-Zhyrau District, a lake in Karaganda Region, Kazakhstan
- Saumalkol, Aiyrtau District, a lake in the North Kazakhstan Region, Kazakhstan
- Saumalkol, Bayanaul District, a lake in Pavlodar Region, Kazakhstan
- Saumalkol (North Kazakhstan), a settlement in the North Kazakhstan Region, Kazakhstan
