= Puwaq Hanka mountain range =

Mountain range in Peru

- Location within Peru

Highest point
- Peak: Puwaq Hanka, Yunkan
- Elevation: 5,278 m (17,316 ft)

Geography
- Country: Peru
- Region(s): Junín Region, Lima Region
- Range coordinates: 11°10′06″S 76°30′47″W
- Parent range: Andes

The Puwaq Hanka mountain range Quechua puwaq, eight, hanka snowcapped peak or ridge, "eight peaks (or ridges)", Hispanicized spelling Puagjanca, also Puagjancha) is in the Andes of Peru. It is located in the Junín Region, Yauli Province, Carhuacayan District, and in the Lima Region, Huaral Province, in the districts of and Andamarca and Atavillos Alto.

== Mountains ==
Some of the highest mountains of the range are Puwaq Hanka at about 5,100 metres (16,732 ft) and Yunkan at about 5,100 metres (16,732 ft).
