= Iskuqucha =

Archaeological site in Peru

- Interactive map of Iskuqucha
- Location: Peru, Junín Region, Yauli Province, La Oroya District

Iskuqucha (Quechua isku lime, qucha lake, "lime lake", Hispanicized spelling Izcucocha) is an archaeological site in Peru. It is located in the Junín Region, Yauli Province, La Oroya District. The site was declared a National Cultural Heritage by Resolución Viceministerial No. 0099-2010-VMPCIC-MC on November 11, 2010.
