= Putaqa (Junín) =

Mountain in Peru

- Location within Peru

Highest point
- Elevation: 4,600 m (15,100 ft)
- Coordinates: 11°26′48″S 76°16′43″W

Geography
- Location: Peru, Junín Region
- Parent range: Andes

Putaqa (Quechua for Rumex peruanus, also spelled Putaca) is a mountain in Peru which reaches a height of approximately 4,600 m (15,100 ft). It is located in the Junín Region, Yauli Province, Marcapomacocha District. A small lake named Aququcha (Quechua for "sand lake") lies at its feet.
