= Santa Barbara de Carhuacayan District =

Santa Bárbara de Carhuacayan
- District
- Interactive map of Santa Bárbara de Carhuacayan
- Country: Peru
- Region: Junín
- Province: Yauli
- Founded: April 7, 1954
- Capital: Santa Barbara de Carhuacayan

Government
  - Mayor: Roque Alejandro Contreras Fraga

Area
  - Total: 646.29 km^{2} (249.53 sq mi)
- Elevation: 4,137 m (13,573 ft)

Population (2005 census)
  - Total: 1,496
  - Density: 2.315/km^{2} (5.995/sq mi)
- Time zone: UTC-5 (PET)
- UBIGEO: 120807
- Website: carhuacayan.blogspot.com

Santa Bárbara de Carhuacayan District or Santa Bárbara de Carhuacayán District is one of ten districts of the Yauli Province in the Junín Region in Peru.

== Geography ==
The Puwaq Hanka mountain range traverses the district. One of the highest mountains of the district is Allqay at 5,359 m (17,582 ft). Other mountains are listed below:

- Allpa Marka
- Anta Wallqan
- Chinchay Kancha
- Chuntas
- Chupa Pata
- Hatun Waqya
- Kimanqucha
- Llaksa
- Llaksha Marka
- Llank'i
- Marayniyuq
- Mit'u Kasha
- Pata Wayin
- Pinkuylluyuq
- Piñiqucha
- Puka Kancha
- Phiwicha
- P'itiqucha
- Qarwa Punta
- Qullpayuq
- Qullqi Mach'ay
- Qhaqru
- Shawaq
- Tampu
- Waqra Kancha
- Warmiqucha
- Yana Uqsha
- Yana Wachuku

== See also ==
- Tuqtuqucha
- Waskhaqucha
