= Toromocho mine =

Mine in Peru

Coordinates: 11.6197°S 76.1407°W

- Interactive map of Toromocho mine
- Location: Mount Toromocho, Junín Region, Peru
- Products: Copper, molybdenum

The Toromocho mine is a large copper mine in the center of Peru, in Junín Region. Toromocho represents one of the largest copper reserves in Peru and in the world, having estimated reserves of 1.52 billion tonnes of ore grading 0.48% copper, 0.019% molybdenum and 336 million oz of silver.

The Toromocho project's environmental impact assessment (EIA) for exploration was approved on December 14, 2010, according to directorial resolution Nº411-2010-MEM/AAM issued by the Peruvian Ministry of Energy and Mines. The consulting company Knight Piésold was in charge of executing said EIA studies. Based on original engineering procurement and construction designs executed in 2008 by Cosapi Engineering and Construction, an engineering and construction firm based in Peru, the mine shall be capable of treating 117,200 tons of ore per day as well as producing 210,000 tons of copper annually. Jacobs Engineering Group in 2013 performed a feasibility study for the Toromocho copper mining facility expansion.

== See also ==
- Mining in Peru
- List of mines in Peru
