= Huay-Huay District =

Huay-Huay
- District
- Interactive map of Huay-Huay
- Country: Peru
- Region: Junín
- Province: Yauli
- Founded: May 05, 1960
- Capital: Huay-Huay

Government
  - Mayor: Isaias Ramon Gonzales

Area
  - Total: 179.94 km^{2} (69.48 sq mi)
- Elevation: 3,970 m (13,020 ft)

Population (2005 census)
  - Total: 1,600
  - Density: 8.9/km^{2} (23/sq mi)
- Time zone: UTC-5 (PET)
- UBIGEO: 120803

Huay-Huay District is one of ten districts of the province Yauli in Peru.

== See also ==
- Chumpi
- Chhuqu P'ukru
- Kiwyu Waqanan
- Kunkus
- Llaksaqucha
