= Marcapomacocha District =

Marcapomacocha Markapumaqucha
- District
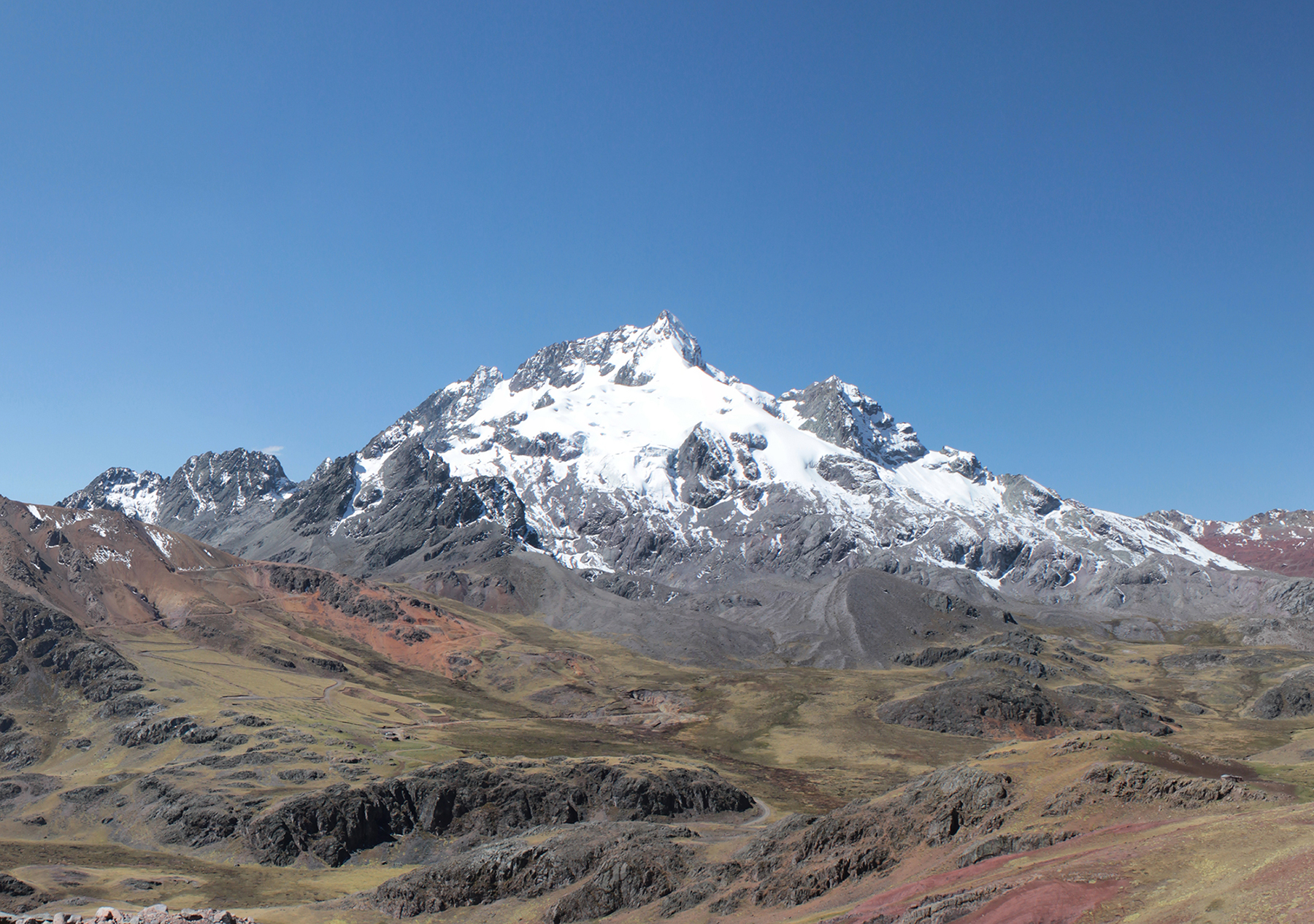
- Rajuntay, one of the highest mountains of the Marcapomacocha District, as seen from the west
- Interactive map of Marcapomacocha
- Country: Peru
- Region: Junín
- Province: Yauli
- Capital: Marcapomacocha

Government
  - Mayor: José Luis Rondon Mateo

Area
  - Total: 888.56 km^{2} (343.07 sq mi)
- Elevation: 4,415 m (14,485 ft)

Population (2005 census)
  - Total: 1,001
  - Density: 1.127/km^{2} (2.918/sq mi)
- Time zone: UTC-5 (PET)
- UBIGEO: 120804

Marcapomacocha District is one of ten districts of the Yauli Province in the Junín Region in Peru.

== Geography ==
Some of the highest mountains of the district are listed below:

- Alma Waqana
- Anta Q'asa
- Atuq Wachanan
- Chakra
- Chunta
- Ch'uyku
- Hanka Pata
- Hirka Kancha
- Jitpa
- Kashpi
- Kunkash
- Kuntur Puñuna
- Kuntur Sinqa
- Kuntur Wayin
- Lashwal
- Lichiqucha
- Liyunqucha
- Marayniyuq
- Mishipa Ñawin
- Muruqucha
- Nina Rupha
- Panapa Shapran
- Pillu
- Pinkuylluyuq
- Puka Rumi
- Pukaqucha
- Putaqa
- Phiruru
- Qallas
- Qiwllaqucha
- Qullpa P'iti
- Qullpayuq
- Qunchupata
- Quri Wayi
- Quriqucha
- Ranra Mach'ay
- Ranti Kancha
- Rajuntay
- Sillaqaqa
- Shaywa
- Uqhu
- Waman Marka
- Wankash
- Waqrash
- Warmis
- Wiskas
- Yana Kancha
- Yana Qaqa
- Yana Ulla
- Yuraq Allpa
- Yuraq Chaka
- Yuraqqucha

== Climate ==
Climate data for Marcapomacocha, elevation 4,447 m (14,590 ft), (1991–2020)
Month	Jan	Feb	Mar	Apr	May	Jun	Jul	Aug	Sep	Oct	Nov	Dec	Year
Mean daily maximum °C (°F)	10.8 (51.4)	10.6 (51.1)	10.5 (50.9)	10.9 (51.6)	11.1 (52.0)	10.8 (51.4)	10.8 (51.4)	11.5 (52.7)	11.5 (52.7)	11.5 (52.7)	11.9 (53.4)	11.1 (52.0)	11.1 (51.9)
Mean daily minimum °C (°F)	0.5 (32.9)	0.7 (33.3)	0.8 (33.4)	0.1 (32.2)	−1.2 (29.8)	−2.7 (27.1)	−3.8 (25.2)	−3.4 (25.9)	−2.0 (28.4)	−0.8 (30.6)	−0.5 (31.1)	0.3 (32.5)	−1.0 (30.2)
Average precipitation mm (inches)	140.0 (5.51)	150.9 (5.94)	171.6 (6.76)	81.0 (3.19)	34.8 (1.37)	12.4 (0.49)	12.1 (0.48)	17.4 (0.69)	41.7 (1.64)	71.3 (2.81)	81.3 (3.20)	114.0 (4.49)	928.5 (36.57)
Source: National Meteorology and Hydrology Service of Peru

Climate data for Yantac, Marcapomacocha, elevation 4,617 m (15,148 ft), (1991–2020)
Month	Jan	Feb	Mar	Apr	May	Jun	Jul	Aug	Sep	Oct	Nov	Dec	Year
Mean daily maximum °C (°F)	8.8 (47.8)	8.6 (47.5)	8.7 (47.7)	9.2 (48.6)	9.8 (49.6)	10.5 (50.9)	10.6 (51.1)	10.8 (51.4)	9.9 (49.8)	9.5 (49.1)	9.6 (49.3)	8.8 (47.8)	9.6 (49.2)
Mean daily minimum °C (°F)	0.6 (33.1)	0.7 (33.3)	0.7 (33.3)	0.5 (32.9)	−0.6 (30.9)	−2.3 (27.9)	−2.9 (26.8)	−2.8 (27.0)	−0.7 (30.7)	0.5 (32.9)	0.4 (32.7)	0.6 (33.1)	−0.4 (31.2)
Average precipitation mm (inches)	128.0 (5.04)	134.4 (5.29)	133.1 (5.24)	73.9 (2.91)	31.0 (1.22)	13.5 (0.53)	15.1 (0.59)	23.7 (0.93)	48.4 (1.91)	79.7 (3.14)	80.6 (3.17)	113.3 (4.46)	874.7 (34.43)
Source: National Meteorology and Hydrology Service of Peru

== See also ==
- Aququcha
- Markapumaqucha
- Markaqucha
- P'ukruqucha
