= Ch'uychu =

Mountain in Peru

- Location within Peru

Highest point
- Elevation: 4,600 m (15,100 ft)
- Coordinates: 11°48′52″S 75°53′49″W

Geography
- Location: Peru, Junín Region
- Parent range: Andes, Cordillera Central

Ch'uychu (Quechua for humid, Hispanicized spelling Chuycho) is a mountain in the Cordillera Central in the Andes of Peru which reaches an altitude of approximately 4,600 metres (15,092 ft). It is located in the Junín Region, Jauja Province, Canchayllo District, and in the Yauli Province, Suitucancha District, southeast of Suitucancha.
