= Lichiqucha =

Mountain in Peru

- Location within Peru

Highest point
- Elevation: 5,000 m (16,000 ft)
- Coordinates: 11°32′34″S 76°21′06″W

Geography
- Location: Peru, Junín Region, Lima Region
- Parent range: Andes

Lichiqucha (Quechua lichi milk (a borrowing from Spanish leche), qucha lake, "milk lake", also spelled Lichicocha) is a mountain in the Andes of Peru which reaches an altitude of approximately 5,000 m (16,000 ft). It is located in the Junín Region, Yauli Province, Marcapomacocha District, and in the Lima Region, Huarochirí Province, in the districts of Carampoma and Huanza. Lichiqucha lies northwest of Liyunqucha.
