= Sillaqaqa =

Mountain in Peru

- Location within Peru

Highest point
- Elevation: 5,000 m (16,000 ft)
- Coordinates: 11°34′11″S 76°14′14″W

Geography
- Location: Peru, Lima Region, Junín Region
- Parent range: Andes

Sillaqaqa (Quechua silla gravel, qaqa rock, "gravel rock", Hispanicized spelling Sillagaga) is a mountain in the Andes of Peru, about 5,000 metres (16,404 ft) high. It is situated in the Junín Region, Yauli Province, Marcapomacocha District, and in the Lima Region, Huarochirí Province, Chicla District. Sillaqaqa lies southwest of the mountain Pukaqucha, west of the mountain Yuraqqucha, northeast of Llawa P'ukru and east of the mountains Quriqucha and Anta Q'asa. The peak south of Sillaqaqa is named Inka Kancha.
