= Lake Tuctococha =

Lake in Peru

- Location within Peru
- Location: Peru; Junín Region
- Coordinates: 11°13′37″S 76°25′51″W

Lake Tuctococha (possibly from Quechua tuqtu broody hen, qucha lake) is a lake in Peru located in the Junín Region, Yauli Province, Carhuacayan District. It lies northeast of Yanque.
