= Liyunqucha =

Mountain in Peru

- Location within Peru

Highest point
- Elevation: 5,215 m (17,110 ft)
- Coordinates: 11°32′33″S 76°19′56″W

Geography
- Location: Peru, Junín Region, Lima Region
- Parent range: Andes

Liyunqucha (Quechua liyun lion (a borrowing from Spanish león, here referring to the cougar), qucha lake, "cougar's (or lion's) lake", also spelled León Cocha) is a 5,215-metre-high (17,110 ft) mountain in the Andes of Peru. It is located in the Junín Region, Yauli Province, Marcapomacocha District, and in the Lima Region, Huarochirí Province, Carampoma District. Liyunqucha lies northwest of Yana Ulla and southeast of a mountain named Lichiqucha.
