= Curicaca District =

Coordinates: 11.7855°S 75.6747°W

Curicaca Quri Qaqa
- District
- Interactive map of Curicaca
- Country: Peru
- Region: Junín
- Province: Jauja
- Founded: May 2, 1962
- Capital: El Rosario

Government
  - Mayor: Domingo Silos Camarena Huaman

Area
  - Total: 64.68 km^{2} (24.97 sq mi)
- Elevation: 3,532 m (11,588 ft)

Population (2005 census)
  - Total: 1,880
  - Density: 29.1/km^{2} (75.3/sq mi)
- Time zone: UTC-5 (PET)
- UBIGEO: 120406

Curicaca (in hispanicized spelling) or Quri Qaqa (Quechua quri gold, qaqa rock, "gold rock") is one of thirty-four districts of the Jauja Province in the Junín Region of Peru.

== See also ==
- Waqraqucha
