= Chicla District =

Coordinates: 11.7050°S 76.2686°W

Chicla Chikla
- District
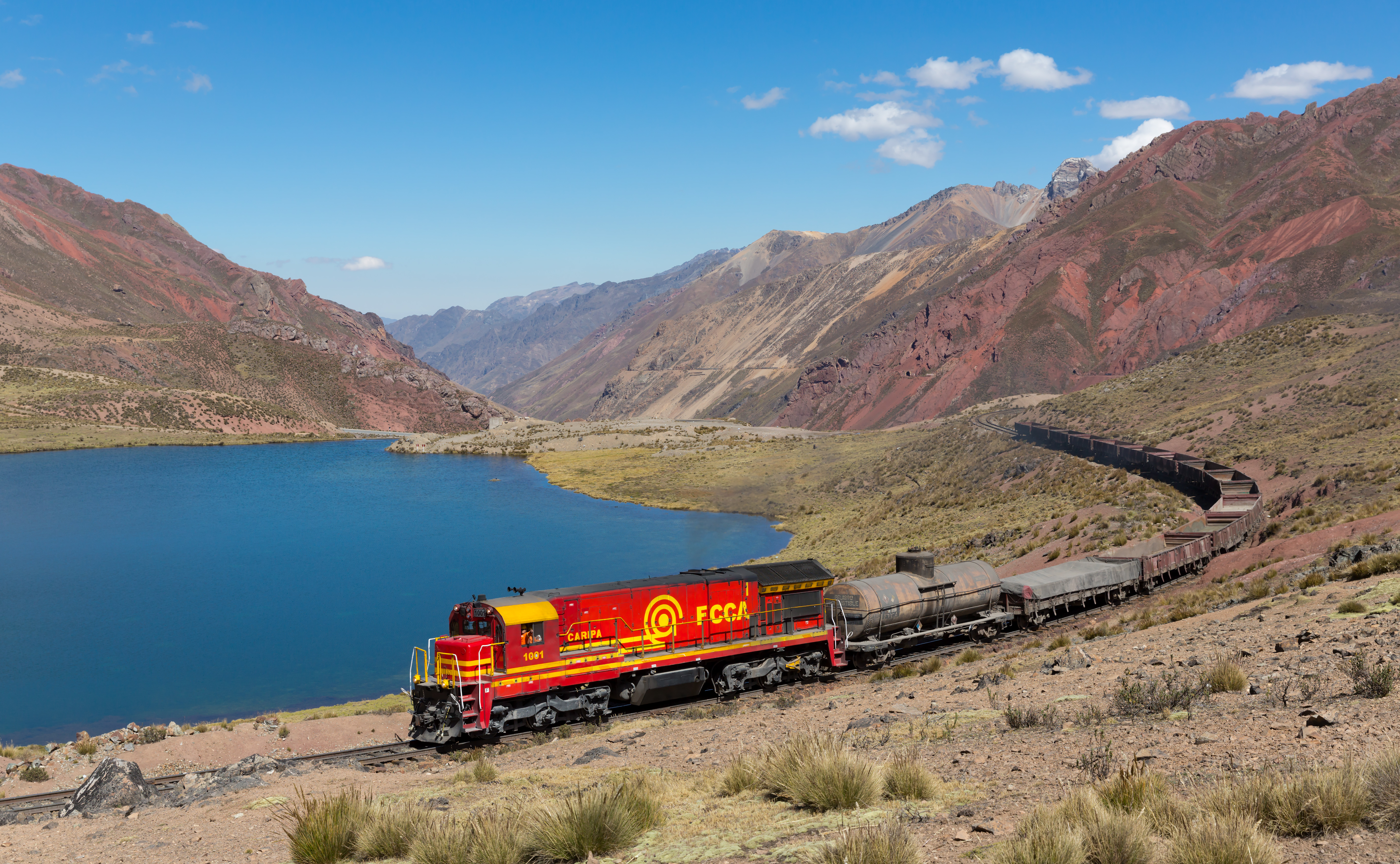
- The train from Lima to La Oroya between Chinchan and the Antikuna pass
- Interactive map of Chicla
- Country: Peru
- Region: Lima
- Province: Huarochirí
- Founded: March 4, 1953
- Capital: Chicla

Government
  - Mayor: Julio Cesar Felix Carlos (2019-2022)

Area
  - Total: 244.1 km^{2} (94.2 sq mi)
- Elevation: 3,793 m (12,444 ft)

Population (2017)
  - Total: 3,826
  - Density: 15.67/km^{2} (40.60/sq mi)
- Time zone: UTC-5 (PET)
- UBIGEO: 150705

Chicla District is one of thirty-two districts of the Huarochirí Province, located in the Department of Lima in Peru. The district was created by the Law No. 11981 on March 4, 1953, during the presidency of Manuel A. Odría, and encompasses an area of 244.1 km^{2}.

== Geography ==
Some of the highest mountains of the district are listed below:

- Anta Q'asa
- Antikuna
- Chinchirusa
- Chuqi Chukchu
- Inka Kancha
- Jirish Mach'ay
- Lichiqucha
- Llawa P'ukru
- Millpu
- Paraqti
- Pukaqucha
- Putka
- Qanchis Kancha
- Qunchupata
- Quñuq P'ukru
- Quri Kancha
- Shira
- Sillaqaqa
- Tawllin
- Tikti Mach'ay
- Ukrupata
- Wachwa
- Wayrakancha
- Yuraqqucha

== See also ==
- Tiktiqucha
- Yuraqmayu
