= Yana Ulla =

Mountain in Peru

- Location within Peru

Highest point
- Elevation: 5,100 m (16,700 ft)
- Coordinates: 11°34′48″S 76°18′07″W

Geography
- Location: Peru, Junín Region, Lima Region
- Parent range: Andes

Yana Ulla (Quechua yana black, Jaqaru ulla grilled potato, "black grilled potato", also spelled Yanaaulla, Yanaulla) is a mountain in the Andes of Peru, about 5,100 metres (16,732 ft) high. It is located in the Junín Region, Yauli Province, Marcapomacocha District, and in the Lima Region, Huarochirí Province, Carampoma District. Yana Ulla lies southwest of Quriqucha and northwest of Qunchupata. A lake named Yana Ulla is at the feet of the mountains.
