= Pachanqutu =

Mountain in Peru

- Location within Peru

Highest point
- Elevation: 5,400 m (17,700 ft)
- Coordinates: 11°54′42″S 76°3′16″W

Geography
- Location: Peru, Lima Region, Junín Region
- Parent range: Andes, Paryaqaqa

Pachanqutu or Phanchaqutu (Quechua pacha world, universe; time, -n a suffix, phancha open (like a blossomed flower), qutu heap, pile, Hispanicized spelling Pachancoto, Panchacoto) is a mountain in the Paryaqaqa or Waruchiri mountain range in the Andes of Peru, about 5,400 metres (17,717 ft) high. It is situated in the Lima Region, Huarochirí Province, San Mateo District, and in the Junín Region, Yauli Province, Suitucancha District. It lieson the western border of the Nor Yauyos-Cochas Landscape Reserve. Pachanqutu lies near Tunshu, southeast of Paka (Paca), south of Sullcon and Americo (5,600 metres (18,373 ft)), and west of the branch of Antachaire.
