= La Oroya District =

La Oroya
- District
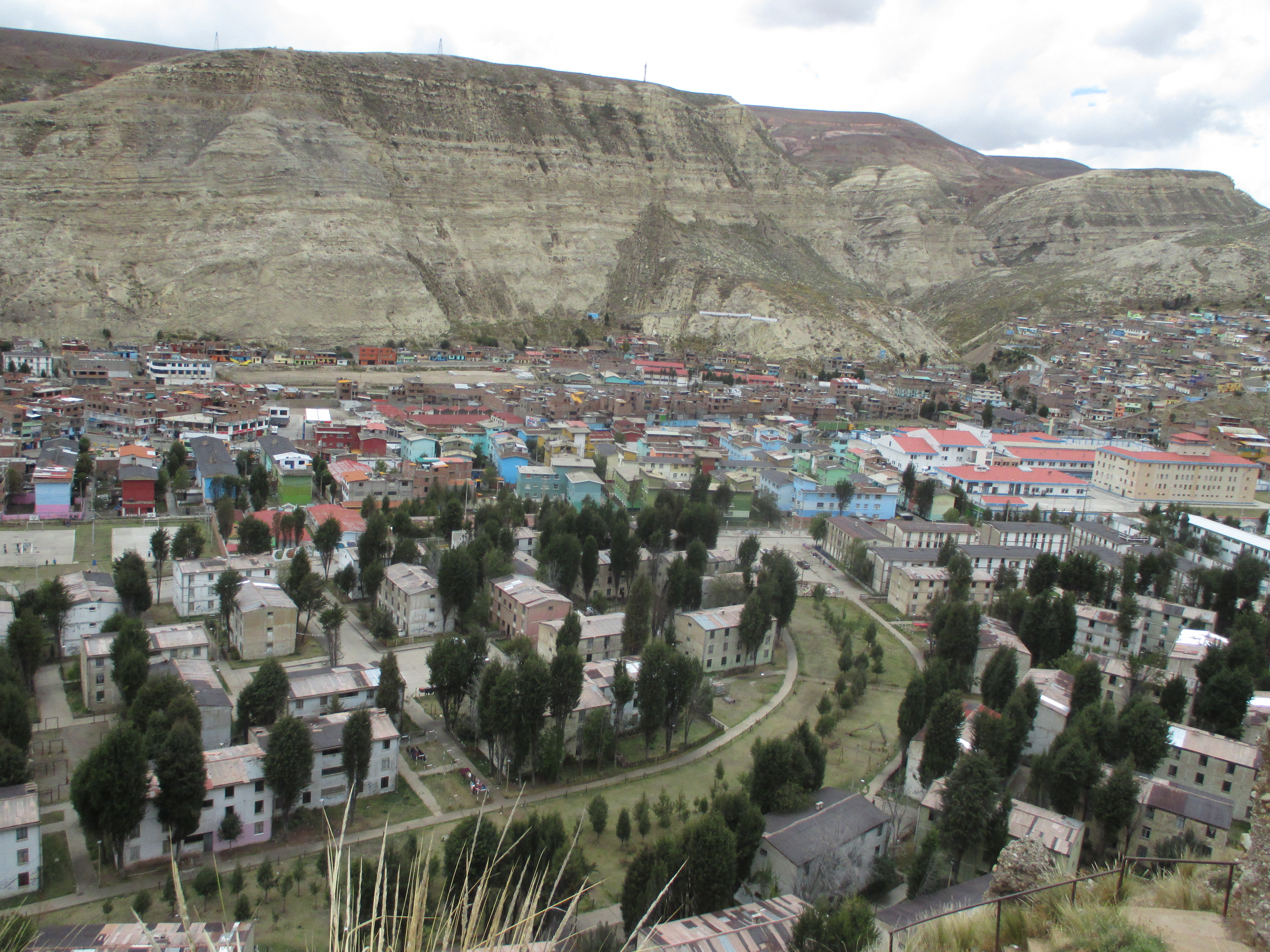

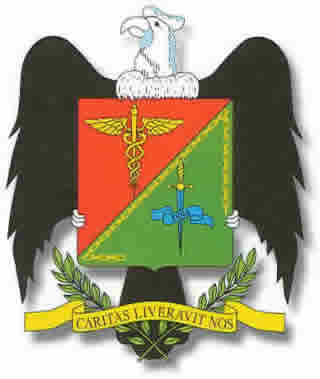
- Coat of arms

- Location within Peru
- Coordinates: 11.5220°S 75.9100°W
- Country: Peru
- Region: Junín
- Province: Yauli
- Founded: November 15, 1893
- Capital: La Oroya

Government
  - Mayor: Cesar Augusto Gutierrez Revilla

Area
  - Total: 388.42 km^{2} (149.97 sq mi)
- Elevation: 3,745 m (12,287 ft)

Population (2017)
  - Total: 14,021
  - Density: 36.098/km^{2} (93.492/sq mi)
- Time zone: UTC-5 (PET)
- UBIGEO: 120801
- Website: munilaoroya.gob.pe

La Oroya District is one of ten districts of the Yauli Province in Peru. It is a region that is rich in zinc, lead and copper.

== Geography ==
One of the highest peaks of the district is Hatun Punta at approximately 4,400 m (14,400 ft). Other mountains are listed below:

- Anta Waru
- Ch'uru Qucha
- Hatun Chunta
- Hatun Waqta
- Hatun Wasi
- K'urpa Kancha
- Maraqniyuq
- Paqcha
- Pata Kancha
- Pishqa Pukyu
- Puytuq
- Waman Marka
- Wamanripa
- Wayu Rumi

== See also ==
- Iskuqucha
