= Chacapalpa District =

Chacapalpa Chakapalpa
- District
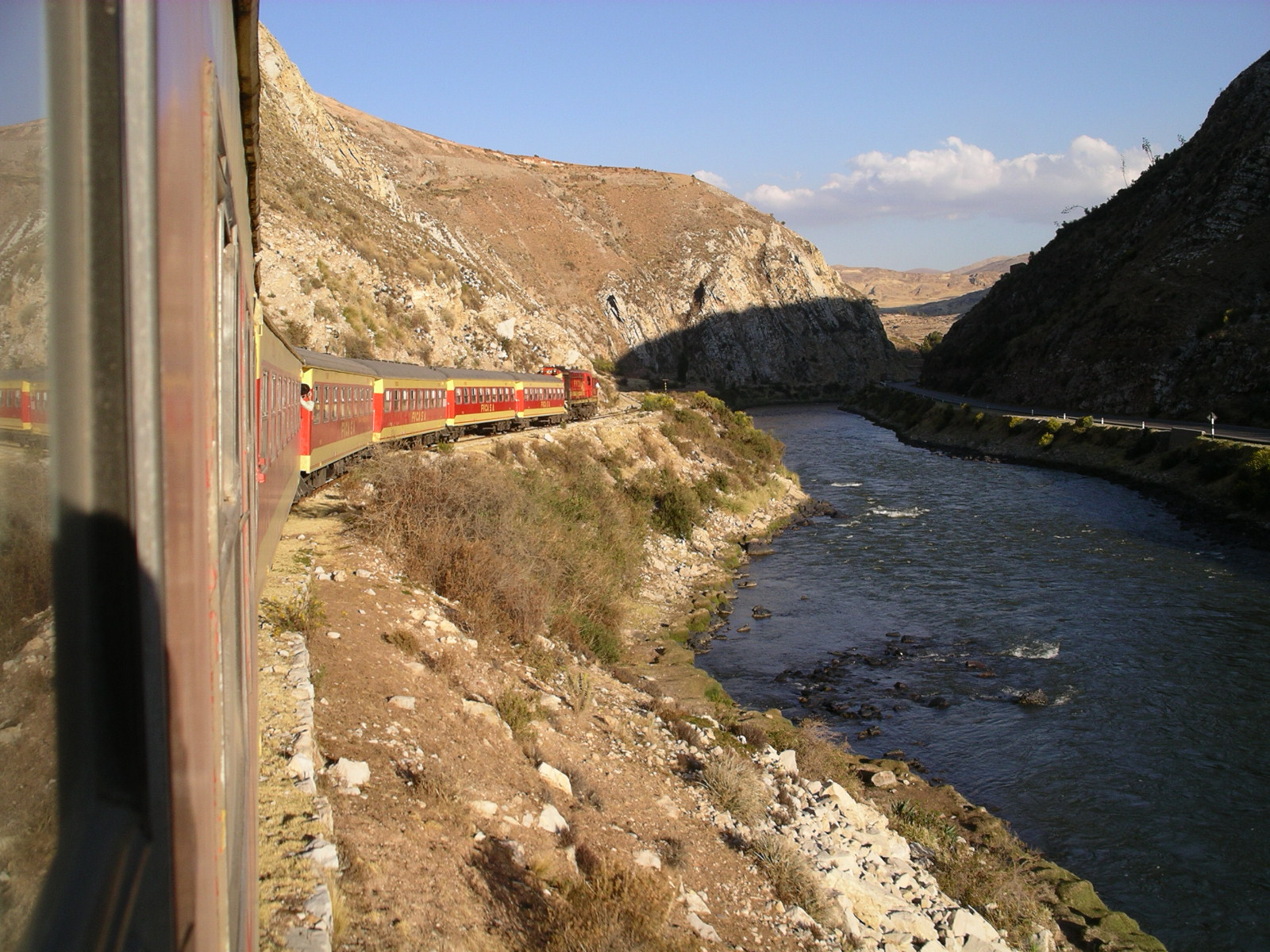
- Interactive map of Chacapalpa
- Country: Peru
- Region: Junín
- Province: Yauli
- Founded: November 28, 1876
- Capital: Chacapalpa

Government
  - Mayor: Emiterio Celedonio Guerra Casas

Area
  - Total: 183.06 km^{2} (70.68 sq mi)
- Elevation: 3,748 m (12,297 ft)

Population (2005 census)
  - Total: 942
  - Density: 5.15/km^{2} (13.3/sq mi)
- Time zone: UTC-5 (PET)
- UBIGEO: 120802

Chacapalpa District is one of ten districts of the province Yauli in Peru.

== See also ==
- Waqraqucha
