= Yawarqucha (Junín) =

Mountain in Peru

- Location within Peru

Highest point
- Elevation: 4,800 m (15,700 ft)
- Coordinates: 11°28′34″S 76°07′09″W

Geography
- Location: Peru, Junín Region, Yauli Province
- Parent range: Andes

Yawarqucha (Quechua yawar blood, qucha lake, "blood lake", Hispanicized spelling Yahuarcocha) is a mountain in the Andes of Peru, 4,800 metres (15,748 ft) high. It is located in the Junín Region, Yauli Province, Morococha District. It lies northeast of Yuraqqucha. The peak east of Yawarqucha is named Miyu (Quechua for "poison", also spelled Mio).
