= Lichiqucha (Chicla-Yauli) =

Mountain in Peru

- Location within Peru

Highest point
- Elevation: 5,000 m (16,000 ft)
- Coordinates: 11°41′56″S 76°12′27″W

Geography
- Location: Peru, Junín Region, Lima Region
- Parent range: Andes

Lichiqucha (Quechua lichi milk (a borrowing from Spanish leche), qucha lake, "milk lake", also spelled Lichicocha) is a mountain at a small lake of that name in the Andes of Peru which reaches an altitude of approximately 5,000 m (16,000 ft). It is located in the Junín Region, Yauli Province, Yauli District, and in the Lima Region, Huarochirí Province, Chicla District. Lichiqucha lies southwest of Wayrakancha.

The lake named Lichiqucha is east of the mountain in the Yauli District at 11°41′57″S 76°12′00″W.
