= Putkaqucha (Yauli) =

Lake in Peru

- Location within Peru
- Location: Junín Region, Yauli Province, Suitucancha District
- Coordinates: 11°50′41″S 76°02′40″W
- Basin countries: Peru

Putkaqucha (Quechua putka muddy (Jauja Quechua), qucha lake, lagoon, "muddy lake", Hispanicized spelling Putcacocha) is a lake in Peru located in the Junín Region, Yauli Province, Suitucancha District. It lies in the Paryaqaqa or Waruchiri mountain range, south of the mountain Putka.

There is a smaller lake of the same name nearby west of Putkaqucha. It lies at 11°50′28″S 76°01′45″W.
