= Wayllakancha =

Mountain in Peru

- Location within Peru

Highest point
- Elevation: 5,400 m (17,700 ft)
- Coordinates: 11°53′24″S 76°2′33″W

Geography
- Location: Peru, Junín Region
- Parent range: Andes, Paryaqaqa

Wayllakancha (Quechua waylla meadow, kancha enclosure, enclosed place, yard, a frame, or wall that encloses, Hispanicized spelling Huayllacancha) is a mountain in the Paryaqaqa mountain range in the Andes of Peru, about 5,400 metres (17,717 ft) high. It is situated in the Junín Region, Yauli Province, in the districts Suitucancha and Yauli. The peaks of Qarwachuku, Wallakancha and Ukhu Qhata lie north-west, north and north-east of Wayllakancha.
