= Santa Rosa de Sacco District =

Santa Rosa de Sacco
- District
- Location within Peru
- Country: Peru
- Region: Junín
- Province: Yauli
- Founded: June 1, 1968
- Capital: Santa Rosa de Sacco

Government
  - Mayor: Hugo Donato Huaman Timoteo

Area
  - Total: 101.09 km^{2} (39.03 sq mi)
- Elevation: 3,845 m (12,615 ft)

Population (2005 census)
  - Total: 11,806
  - Density: 116.79/km^{2} (302.48/sq mi)
- Time zone: UTC-5 (PET)
- UBIGEO: 120808

Santa Rosa de Sacco District is one of ten districts of the province Yauli in Peru.

== Climate ==
Climate data for La Oroya, Santa Rosa de Sacco, elevation 3,842 m (12,605 ft), (1991–2020)
Month	Jan	Feb	Mar	Apr	May	Jun	Jul	Aug	Sep	Oct	Nov	Dec	Year
Mean daily maximum °C (°F)	15.4 (59.7)	15.1 (59.2)	15.0 (59.0)	15.5 (59.9)	16.0 (60.8)	15.6 (60.1)	15.3 (59.5)	15.7 (60.3)	15.8 (60.4)	16.0 (60.8)	16.8 (62.2)	15.5 (59.9)	15.6 (60.2)
Mean daily minimum °C (°F)	3.4 (38.1)	4.1 (39.4)	4.0 (39.2)	2.7 (36.9)	0.4 (32.7)	−1.7 (28.9)	−2.3 (27.9)	−1.3 (29.7)	0.9 (33.6)	2.1 (35.8)	2.3 (36.1)	3.4 (38.1)	1.5 (34.7)
Average precipitation mm (inches)	93.2 (3.67)	102.8 (4.05)	81.2 (3.20)	46.6 (1.83)	22.3 (0.88)	13.5 (0.53)	13.3 (0.52)	17.4 (0.69)	37.3 (1.47)	52.0 (2.05)	57.0 (2.24)	91.0 (3.58)	627.6 (24.71)
Source: National Meteorology and Hydrology Service of Peru
