= Paccha District, Yauli =

Paccha Paqcha
- District
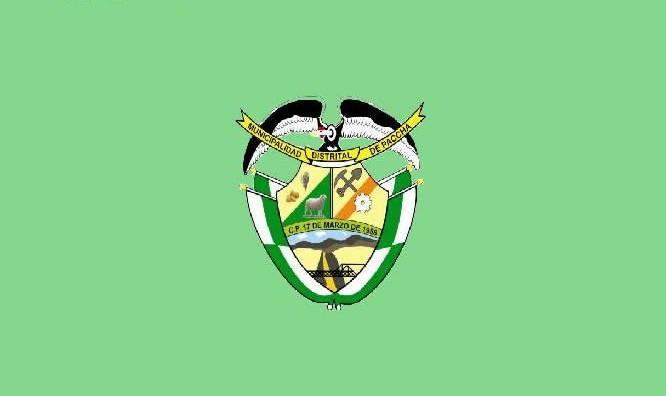
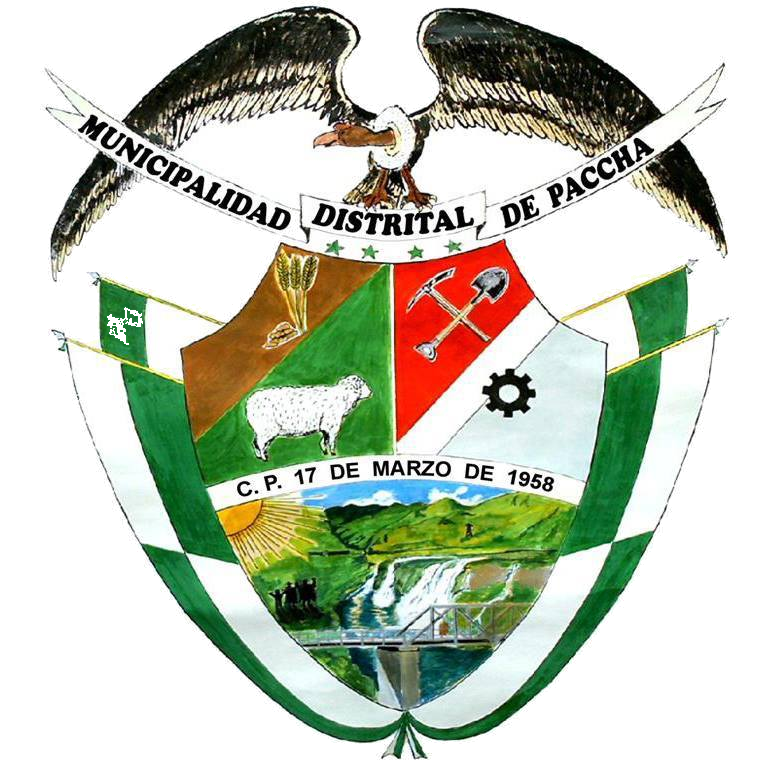
- Flag Coat of arms
- Interactive map of Paccha
- Country: Peru
- Region: Junín
- Province: Yauli
- Founded: March 17, 1958
- Capital: Paccha

Government
  - Mayor: Saturnino Mc Gerson Camargo Zavala

Area
  - Total: 323.69 km^{2} (124.98 sq mi)
- Elevation: 3,742 m (12,277 ft)

Population (2005 census)
  - Total: 1,987
  - Density: 6.139/km^{2} (15.90/sq mi)
- Time zone: UTC-5 (PET)
- UBIGEO: 120806

Paccha (from local Quechua Paqcha) is one of the ten districts of the Yauli Province in Peru.

== Geography ==
One of the highest peaks of the district is Qarwa Kancha at approximately 4,600 m (15,100 ft). Other mountains are listed below:

- Anta Waru
- Chuqi Kancha
- Ch'aki Qucha
- Ch'ukchu Kancha
- Ch'uru Kancha
- Killa Qucha
- Kallpa
- Kunkan
- Kushuru Qucha
- Llama Pashillun
- Manka Warqu
- Maray Pata
- Muki Marka
- Pata Kancha
- Pichqa Pukyu
- Puka Qucha
- Puma Qucha
- Puypuy
- Phiruruyuq
- Q'allachayuq
- Q'ara Chuku
- Saqra Wayin
- Tunsu Kancha
- Ukru Kancha
- Waquru Kancha
- Warmi Qucha
- Wayna Kancha
- Yanta Kancha
- Yuraq Kancha
