= Parqash =

Mountain in Peru

- Location within Peru

Highest point
- Elevation: 5,000 m (16,000 ft)
- Coordinates: 11°15′06″S 76°30′39″W

Geography
- Location: Peru, Lima Region, Huaral Province
- Parent range: Andes

Parqash (local Quechua for two separate things which seem to be united (parqa, hispanicized spelling: Parcash) is a mountain in the Andes of Peru which reaches an altitude of approximately 5,000 metres (16,404 ft). It is located in the Lima Region, Huaral Province, Atavillos Alto District.

Parqash is also the name of a small lake southeast of the mountain at 11°15′38″S 76°30′12″W.
