= Atavillos Alto District =

Coordinates: 11°14′04″S 76°39′20″W

Atavillos Alto
- District
- Interactive map of Atavillos Alto
- Country: Peru
- Region: Lima
- Province: Huaral
- Capital: Pirca

Government
  - Mayor: Martha Baldeon (2019-2022)

Area
  - Total: 347.69 km^{2} (134.24 sq mi)
- Elevation: 3,255 m (10,679 ft)

Population (2017)
  - Total: 687
  - Density: 1.98/km^{2} (5.12/sq mi)
- Time zone: UTC-5 (PET)
- UBIGEO: 150602

Atavillos Alto District is one of twelve districts of the Huaral Province in Peru.

== Geography ==
One of the highest mountains of the district is Allqay at 5,359 m (17,582 ft) located in the Puwaq Hanka mountain range. Other mountains include:

- Anta Chuku
- Llank'i
- Miqa Parqa
- Parqash
- P'aqu Qucha
- Qarpa Qucha
- Sankhu Punta
- Wamanripa
- Wamp'u Qalla
- Wanaku Punta
- Wank'a Hankalla Qullqa
- Waqra Markan
- Yana Kancha
- Yana Qaqa
- Yana Uqhu
