= Saumalkol, Bayanaul District =

Lake in Kazakhstan

Saumalkol
- Саумалкөл
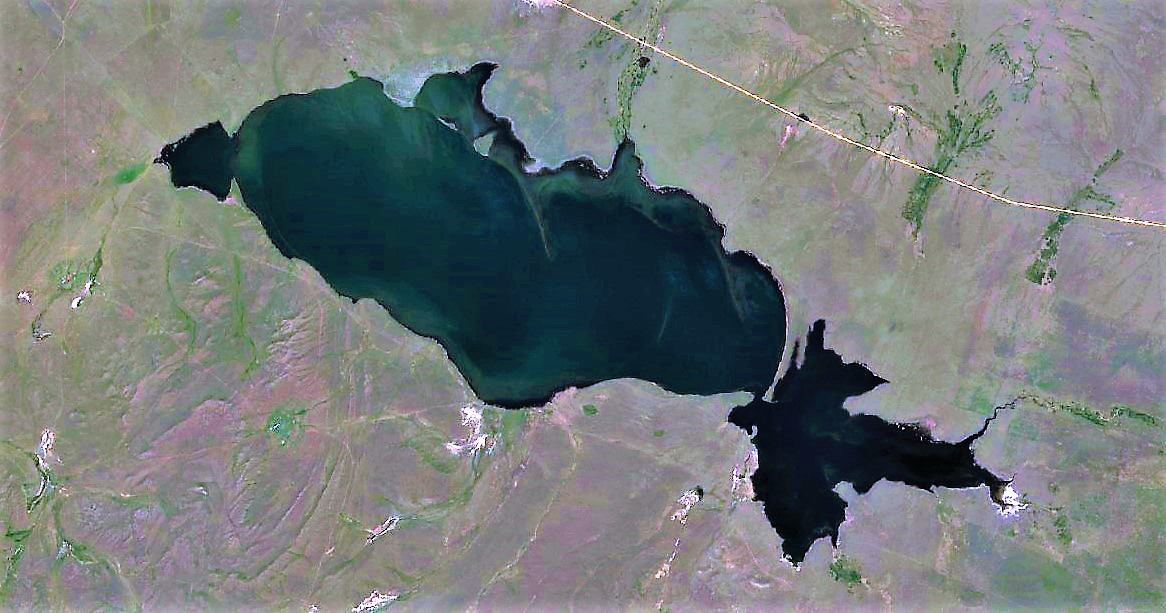
- Sentinel-2 image of the lake

- Location within Kazakhstan
- Location: Kazakh Uplands
- Coordinates: 50°42′42″N 74°20′44″E
- Type: endorheic
- Primary outflows: none
- Catchment area: 52 square kilometers (20 sq mi)
- Basin countries: Kazakhstan
- Max. length: 5.3 kilometers (3.3 mi)
- Max. width: 2.2 kilometers (1.4 mi)
- Surface area: 7.1 square kilometers (2.7 sq mi)
- Residence time: UTC+6
- Shore length^{1}: 13.4 kilometers (8.3 mi)
- Surface elevation: 419 meters (1,375 ft)
- Islands: none
- ^{1} Shore length is not a well-defined measure.

Saumalkol (Kazakh: Саумалкөл; Russian: Саумалколь) is a permanent lake in Bayanaul District, Pavlodar Region, Kazakhstan.

The nearest inhabited place is Uzynbulak, located 12 kilometers (7.5 mi) to the NNW.

== Geography ==
Saumalkol is an endorheic lake in the Shiderti basin, Kazakh Uplands. The lake is elongated and stretches in a roughly WNW/ESE direction for over 5 kilometers (3.1 mi). There is a 10 centimeters (3.9 in) to 15 centimeters (5.9 in) thick layer of silt at the bottom of the lake. Large swathes of the shoreline are covered with reeds. The western and southern sections of the lakeshore are rocky, while to the east and northeast there are swampy areas. The lake surface usually freezes in the first half of November and thaws by mid April.

Saumalkol has water all year round. It is fed mainly by groundwater, as well as by springs originating in the neighboring Zhylan and Sarymsak mountains. There are grasslands and livestock-grazing grounds surrounding the lake.

== See also ==
- List of lakes of Kazakhstan
