= Lake Marcacocha =

Lake in Peru

- Location within Peru
- Location: Peru; Junín Region
- Coordinates: 11°22′15″S 76°20′42″W
- Max. length: 2.79 km (1.73 mi)
- Max. width: 1.28 km (0.80 mi)
- Surface elevation: 4,544 m (14,908 ft)

Lake Markacocha (possibly from Quechua marka village, qucha lake) is a lake in Peru located in the Junín Region, Yauli Province, Marcapomacocha District. It is situated at a height of about 4,544 metres (14,908 ft), about 2.79 km long and 1.28 km at its widest point. Lake Marcacocha lies north of Lake Marcapomacocha and southwest of Mount Mishipañahuin.
