= Milk Lake Glacier =

Glacier in Washington, United States

- Location within Washington (state)
- Type: Mountain glacier
- Location: Glacier Peak Wilderness, Snohomish County, Washington, USA
- Coordinates: 48°09′05″N 121°09′18″W
- Terminus: Proglacial Lake
- Status: Retreating/Extinct

Milk Lake Glacier is located in the Glacier Peak Wilderness in the U.S. state of Washington. The glacier is within Mount Baker-Snoqualmie National Forest and a little over 3 mi (4.8 km) northwest of Glacier Peak. Milk Lake Glacier disappeared sometime between 1984 and 1997 and by 2005, Milk Lake was situated where the glacier had once been.

== See also ==
- List of glaciers in the United States
