= Mishipañahuin =

Mountain in Peru

- Location within Peru

Highest point
- Elevation: 5,208 m (17,087 ft)
- Coordinates: 11°21′31″S 76°19′15″W

Geography
- Location: Peru, Junín Region
- Parent range: Andes

Mishipañahuin (possibly from Quechua mishi cat (misi, michi), ñawi eye, -pa, -n suffixes, a kind of potato or a name for the common bean) is a 5,208-metre-high (17,087 ft) mountain in the Andes of Peru. It is located in the Junín Region, Yauli Province, Marcapomacocha District. It lies northeast of Lake Marcapomacocha and at the shore of Lake Marcacocha.
