= Wayrakancha =

Mountain in Peru

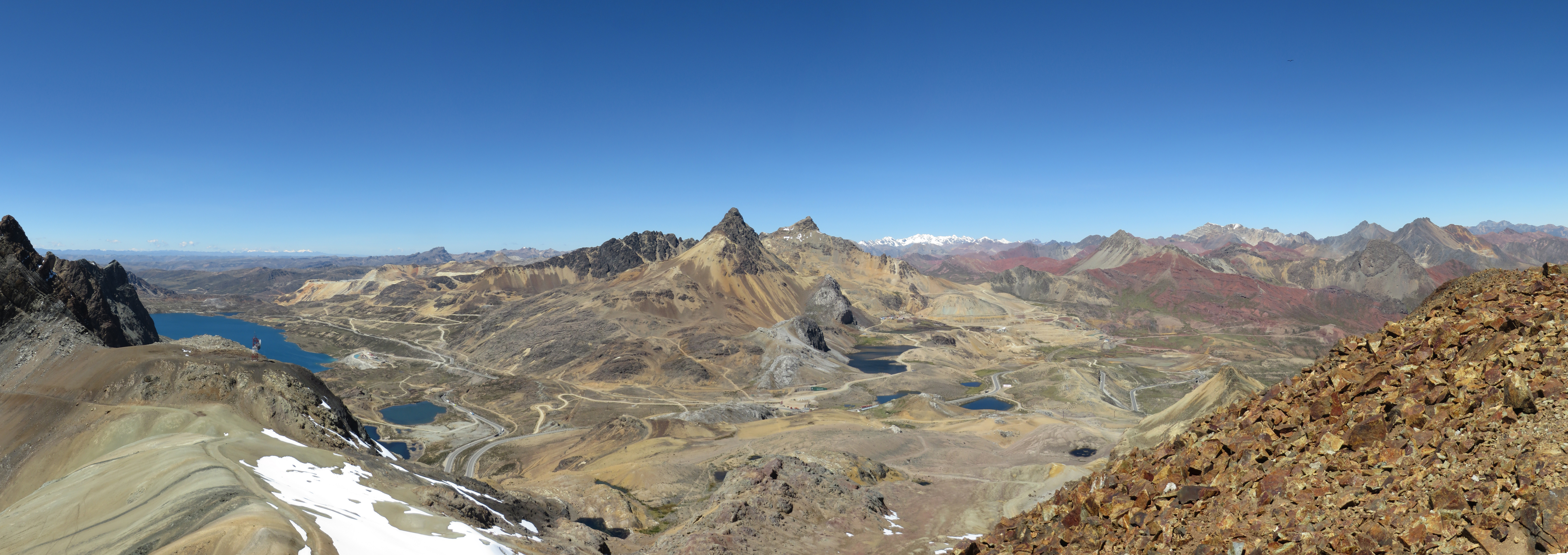
- View from the summit of Yuraqqucha, looking to the southeast. Snow-covered Wayrakancha is visible in the background on the right.

Highest point
- Elevation: 5,300 m (17,400 ft)
- Coordinates: 11°41′25″S 76°11′49″W

Geography
- Location within Peru
- Location: Peru, Junín Region, Lima Region
- Parent range: Andes, Cordillera Central

Wayrakancha (Quechua wayra wind, kancha enclosure, enclosed place, yard, a frame, or wall that encloses, Hispanicized spelling Huayracancha) is a mountain in the Cordillera Central in the Andes of Peru, about 5,300 metres (17,388 ft) high. It is situated in the Junín Region, Yauli Province, Yauli District, and in the Lima Region, Huarochiri Province, Chicla District. Wayrakancha lies northwest of Pumaqucha.

== See also ==
- Putka
