= Waman Marka (La Oroya) =

Mountain in Peru

- Location within Peru

Highest point
- Elevation: 4,200 m (13,800 ft)
- Coordinates: 11°31′55″S 75°53′06″W

Geography
- Location: Peru, Junín Region, Yauli Province, La Oroya District
- Parent range: Andes

Waman Marka (Quechua waman falcon, marka village, Hispanicized spelling Huamanmarca) is a mountain in the Andes of Peru which reaches an altitude of approximately 4,200 metres (13,780 ft). It is located in the Junín Region, Yauli Province, La Oroya District, southeast of La Oroya.
