= Morococha District =

Coordinates: 11.6113°S 76.1392°W

Morococha Muruqucha
- District
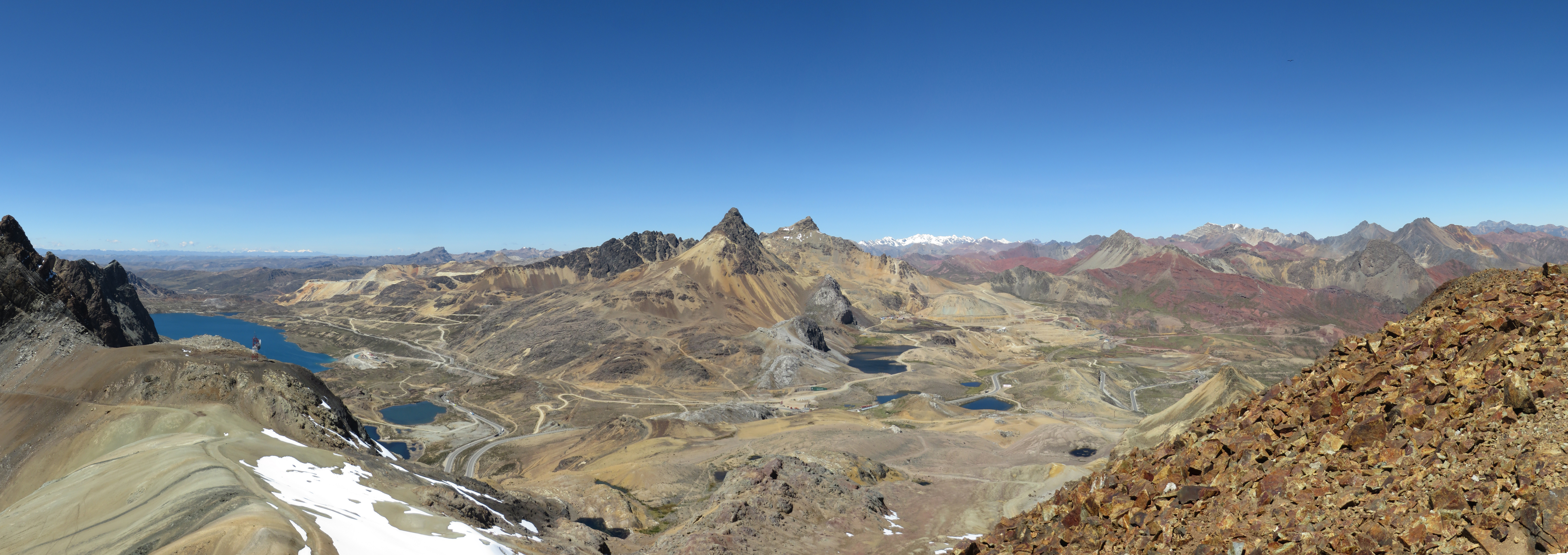
- Waqraqucha (the largest lake on the left) as seen from Yuraqqucha
- Interactive map of Morococha
- Country: Peru
- Region: Junín
- Province: Yauli
- Founded: December 21, 1907
- Capital: Nueva Morococha

Government
  - Mayor: Marcial Tolentino Salome Ponce

Area
  - Total: 265.67 km^{2} (102.58 sq mi)
- Elevation: 4,550 m (14,930 ft)

Population (2005 census)
  - Total: 4,681
  - Density: 17.62/km^{2} (45.63/sq mi)
- Time zone: UTC-5 (PET)
- UBIGEO: 120805

Morococha District is one of ten districts of the province Yauli in Peru.

== Geography ==
Some of the highest mountains of the district are listed below:

- Antikuna
- Challwaqucha
- Llama Pashillun
- Mit'u
- Miyu
- Puka Mach'ay
- Pukaqucha
- Puypuy
- P'uqush
- Quchayuq
- Shawaq
- Warmiqucha
- Wayna Kancha
- Yanasinqa
- Yawarqucha
- Yuraqqucha (Lima-Junín)
- Yuraqqucha (Yauli)

== See also ==
- Waskhaqucha
- Waqraqucha
