= Mount Toromocho =

Mountain in Peru

Coordinates: 11.64627°S 76.14501°W

Mount Toromocho is a mountain in the Junín Region, Peru that sits next to the long established mining camp of Morococha and hosts a large polymetallic metal deposit. Toromocho means in Spanish "a bull with no horns". It is now owned by the Aluminum Corporation of China (Chinalco), a parent company of Chinalco Mining Corporation International (CMC). Minera Chinalco Perú S.A., a subsidiary of CMC which operates the Toromocho mine, is boosting the mine's productivity with a new production line.

== History ==
The mineralisation on Toromocho has been known and mined on a small scale for many years and was drilled by both the Cerro de Pasco Corporation and its successor (after nationalization) Centromin between 1966 and 1976 but it was evidently not considered worth exploiting, possibly due to lack of finance in the case of Centromin and the spectre of nationalization in the case of Cerro, or because it did not look economically viable at the prevailing metal prices.

Peru Copper Inc. was formed in February 2004 and took over the Toromocho option that had been successfully bid for from Centromin by its predecessor company. The five-year option required certain expenditures which Peru Copper completed satisfactorily and the option was exercised on 5 May 2008. There is no indication of any further payment for the exercise of the option.

In the meantime on 11 July 2007, Chinalco purchased Vancouver listed Peru Copper Inc for C$840 million and it became a wholly owned subsidiary of Chinalco. The new owner now plans to establish an open pit copper mine at a cost of US$2.16 billion to produce 210,000 tonnes of copper annually.

== The deposit and its resources ==
Much of the technical information comes from a report prepared by Independent Mining Consultants of Tucson, Arizona entitled Toromocho Project Technical Report, Prepared For Peru Copper, Inc.

The mountain of Toromocho is located about 140 km east of Lima on the main road to La Oroya. High tension power lines pass close by (although inadequate for Toromocho at present) as does the Central Railroad though part of this may have to be relocated as it runs over the projected limit of the open pit. It is next to the mining camp of Morococha where SIMSA and Pan American operate underground silver/lead/zinc mines. It is not clear how Toromocha will affect these operations but it has already been decided to move part of the Morococha mining camp. Chinalco is offering guaranteed housing and US$2,000 compensation to residents that have to relocate due to the development of the mine, and the offer has been accepted by a majority of the population via a referendum according to a BBC report.

The deposit is very high with elevations over the deposit ranging from 4,700 to 4,900 metres (15,400 to 16,100 feet). Neither humans nor diesel powered machinery work very well at that altitude as anyone who travels up from Lima on the main road over the 4,818 metres (15,807 feet) El Ticlio pass realises as the engine starts to struggle towards the top. Also there is anecdotal evidence of geologists being quite unable to understand their notes made on top of the mountain due to the befuddling of their minds by the lack of oxygen. Hence, the early years of the development of the mine may not easily be progressed.

The deposit is complex but has the general characteristics of a porphyry copper. It consists of a core of copper with molybdenum and silver, surrounded by a lead/zinc zone then a lead/silver zone that is being mined to the north-east of Toromocho by various small companies. It has been mined on a small scale in the past and the underground workings have proved to be valuable drill sites. The ore reserves and resources released in the IMC Technical Report were as follows:

- Proven and probable reserves 1,375 million tonnes grading 0.51% copper, 0.018% molybdenum and 7.06 g/tonnes silver.
- Resources were estimated at 601 million tonnes grading 0.37% copper, 0.016% molybdenum and 6.82 g/tonne silver.

Using the recoveries estimated by IMC, the recoverable metal from the reserves would be 5.7 million tonnes of copper, 148,000 tonnes molybdenum and 188 million ounces of silver, giving a life of over 25 years at an average production rate of 210,000 tonnes copper annually, plus another 8 years if the resources prove payable, a total of 35 years.

== The mine ==
Chinalco estimate that it will cost US$2.16b to bring the Toromocho mine to production in 2012 and that annual production will be 210,000 tonnes copper.

Operating costs are likely to be relatively high per pound of copper despite a low stripping ratio (the amount of waste that has to be moved to access the ore), again due to the low grade coupled with the adverse working conditions. On the other hand, the molybdenum and silver will be very valuable sources of byproduct income which at current prices could cover operating costs.

Metallurgically the concentrate is likely to be relatively complex. It will contain arsenic which could well incur smelter penalties in the early years because of the enargite (Cu3AsS4) in the top of the deposit. The zinc and antimony are unlikely to be a problem. A more serious problem is the presence of variable quantities of talc which come out with the copper/molybdenum concentrate and tend to depress the copper grade of the concentrate. Sodium carboxymethylcellulose (CMC), will suppress the talc in the flotation process but it has the unfortunate side effect of reducing molybdenum recovery. It gives a higher grade copper concentrate but also lower recovery. A high grade copper concentrate is very desirable because smelters generally deduct 1% from the copper content which is a higher percentage of a low grade concentrate than a high one.
