= Shawaq =

Mountain in Peru

- Location within Peru

Highest point
- Elevation: 5,100 m (16,700 ft)
- Coordinates: 11°33′47″S 76°09′54″W

Geography
- Location: Peru, Junín Region, Yauli Province
- Parent range: Andes

Shawaq (Quechua shawa Sambucus peruviana, -q a suffix, hispanicized spelling Shahuac) is a mountain in the Andes of Peru, about 5,100 metres (16,732 ft) high. It is located in the Junín Region, Yauli Province, Morococha District, north of a lake named Waqraqucha.
