= Waqraqucha (Jauja-Yauli) =

Mountain in Peru

- Location within Peru

Highest point
- Elevation: 4,400 m (14,400 ft)
- Coordinates: 11°42′48″S 75°42′03″W

Geography
- Location: Peru, Junín Region
- Parent range: Andes, Cordillera Central

Waqraqucha (Quechua waqra horn, qucha lake, "horn lake", also spelled Huacracocha) is a mountain in the Cordillera Central in the Andes of Peru at a small lake of that name which reaches a height of approximately 4,400 metres (14,436 ft). It is located in the Junín Region, Jauja Province, on the border of the districts of Curicaca and Pomacancha, and in the Yauli Province, Chacapalpa District.

The lake named Waqraqucha lies southeast of the peak in the Curicaca District at 11°43′19″S 75°41′46″W.
