= Alcay (Junin) =

Mountain in Peru

- Location within Peru

Highest point
- Elevation: 5,359 m (17,582 ft)
- Coordinates: 11°17′48″S 76°28′30″W

Geography
- Location: Peru, Junín Region, Lima Region
- Parent range: Andes

Alcay (possibly from Quechua for to cut halfway through, to interrupt; to fail,) or Alcoy (allquy means "my dog") is a 5,359-metre-high (17,582 ft) mountain in the Andes of Peru. It is located in the Junín Region, Yauli Province, Carhuacayan District and in the Lima Region, Huaral Province, Atavillos Alto District. It lies southwest of Yanque.
