= Muruqucha (Marcapomacocha) =

Mountain in Peru

- Location within Peru

Highest point
- Elevation: 4,600 m (15,100 ft)
- Coordinates: 11°18′08″S 76°18′57″W

Geography
- Location: Peru, Junín Region, Yauli Province, Marcapomacocha District
- Parent range: Andes

Muruqucha (Quechua muru blunt; mutilated; stained; pip, grain; smallpox, qucha lake, hispanicized spelling Morococha) is a mountain at a small lake of that name in the Andes of Peru which reaches an altitude of approximately 4,600 metres (15,092 ft). It is located in the Junín Region, Yauli Province, Marcapomacocha District.

The lake named Muruqucha lies on the southeastern slope of the mountain at 11°18′34″S 76°18′48″W. Yanaqucha ("black lake") is the name of the larger lake southwest of Muruqucha.
