= Pukaqucha (Junín-Lima) =

Mountain in Peru

- Location within Peru

Highest point
- Elevation: 5,100 m (16,700 ft)
- Coordinates: 11°33′41″S 76°13′33″W

Geography
- Location: Peru, Lima Region, Junín Region
- Parent range: Andes

Pukaqucha (Quechua puka red, qucha lake, "red lake", Hispanicized spelling Pucacocha) is a mountain in the Andes of Peru, about 5,100 metres (16,732 ft) high, at a small lake of the same name. The mountain is located in the Junín Region, Yauli Province, in the districts of Marcapomacocha and Morococha, and in the Lima Region, Huarochirí Province, Chicla District. It lies near the Antikuna pass, northwest of Yuraqqucha and northeast of Inka Kancha and Sillaqaqa.

The little lake named Pukaqucha is situated west of the mountain. It lies in the Marcapomacocha District at 11°33′32″S 76°14′49″W.
