= Tukumach'ay (Yauli) =

Mountain in Peru

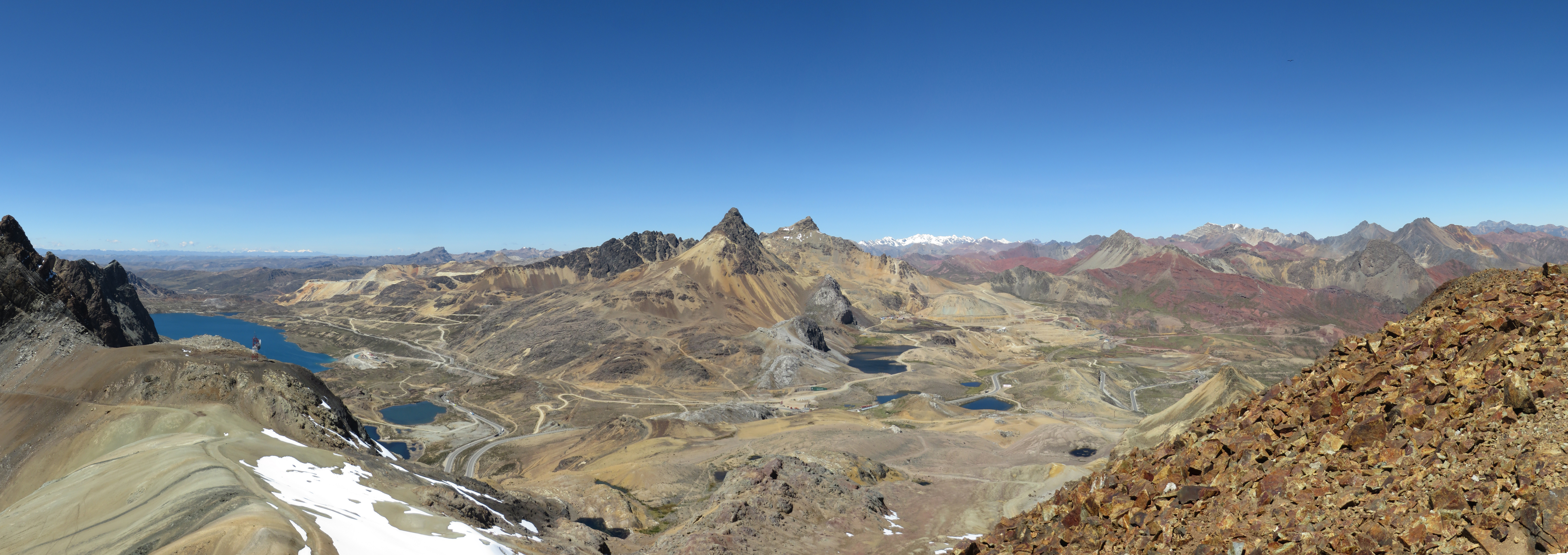
- View from the summit of Yuraqqucha, looking to the southeast, showing the northwestern slopes of Tuku Mach'ay in the center of this image.

Highest point
- Elevation: 5,000 m (16,000 ft)
- Coordinates: 11°38′38″S 76°09′35″W

Geography
- Location within Peru
- Location: Peru, Junín Region, Yauli Province, Yauli District
- Parent range: Andes

Tukumach'ay or Tuku Mach'ay (Quechua tuku owl, t'uqu a niche in the wall, mach'ay a cave, a niche in the wall Hispanicized spelling Tucu Machay) is a mountain in the Andes of Peru, about 5,000 metres (16,404 ft) high. It is situated in the Junín Region, Yauli Province, Yauli District. Tukumach'ay lies southeast of the Antikuna mountain pass and south of Waqraqucha.
