= Saltpeter (disambiguation) =

Saltpeter (or saltpetre) is the mineral form of potassium nitrate (KNO_{3}), a chemical compound.

It may also sometimes refer to:

- Sodium nitrate (NaNO_{3}), a compound
  - Chile saltpeter or nitratine, the mineral form
- Norwegian saltpeter or calcium nitrate (Ca(NO_{3})_{2})
- Magnesium nitrate (Mg(NO_{3})_{2})

== See also ==
- Saltpetre Republic, a term used in Chilean historiography for the 1879–1914 period
- Salpeter (disambiguation)
