= Suitucancha District =

Suitucancha Suyt'u Kancha
- District
- Interactive map of Suitucancha
- Country: Peru
- Region: Junín
- Province: Yauli
- Founded: January 13, 1962
- Capital: Suitucancha

Government
  - Mayor: Emilio Venusto Hurtado León

Area
  - Total: 216.47 km^{2} (83.58 sq mi)
- Elevation: 4,255 m (13,960 ft)

Population (2005 census)
  - Total: 937
  - Density: 4.33/km^{2} (11.2/sq mi)
- Time zone: UTC-5 (PET)
- UBIGEO: 120809

Suitucancha (Hispanicized spelling of the Quechua term Suyt'u Kancha, suyt'u rectangular, kancha corral, square, "rectangular corral (or square)") is one of ten districts of the Yauli Province in Peru. Its seat is Suitucancha.

== Geography ==
The Paryaqaqa mountain range traverses the district. One of the highest mountains of the district is Tunshu at 5,660 m (18,570 ft). Other mountain are listed below:

- Chhuqu P'ukru
- Ch'uychu
- Hatun Uqhu
- Inka Waqanan
- Miqlla
- Pachanqutu
- Putka
- Qarwachuku
- Qayqu
- Suyruqucha
- Ukhu Qhata
- Wallakancha
- Wayllakancha
- Yantayuq

== See also ==
- Putkaqucha
