= Yauli province =

Coordinates: 11.521514°S 75.909273°W

Yauli
- Province
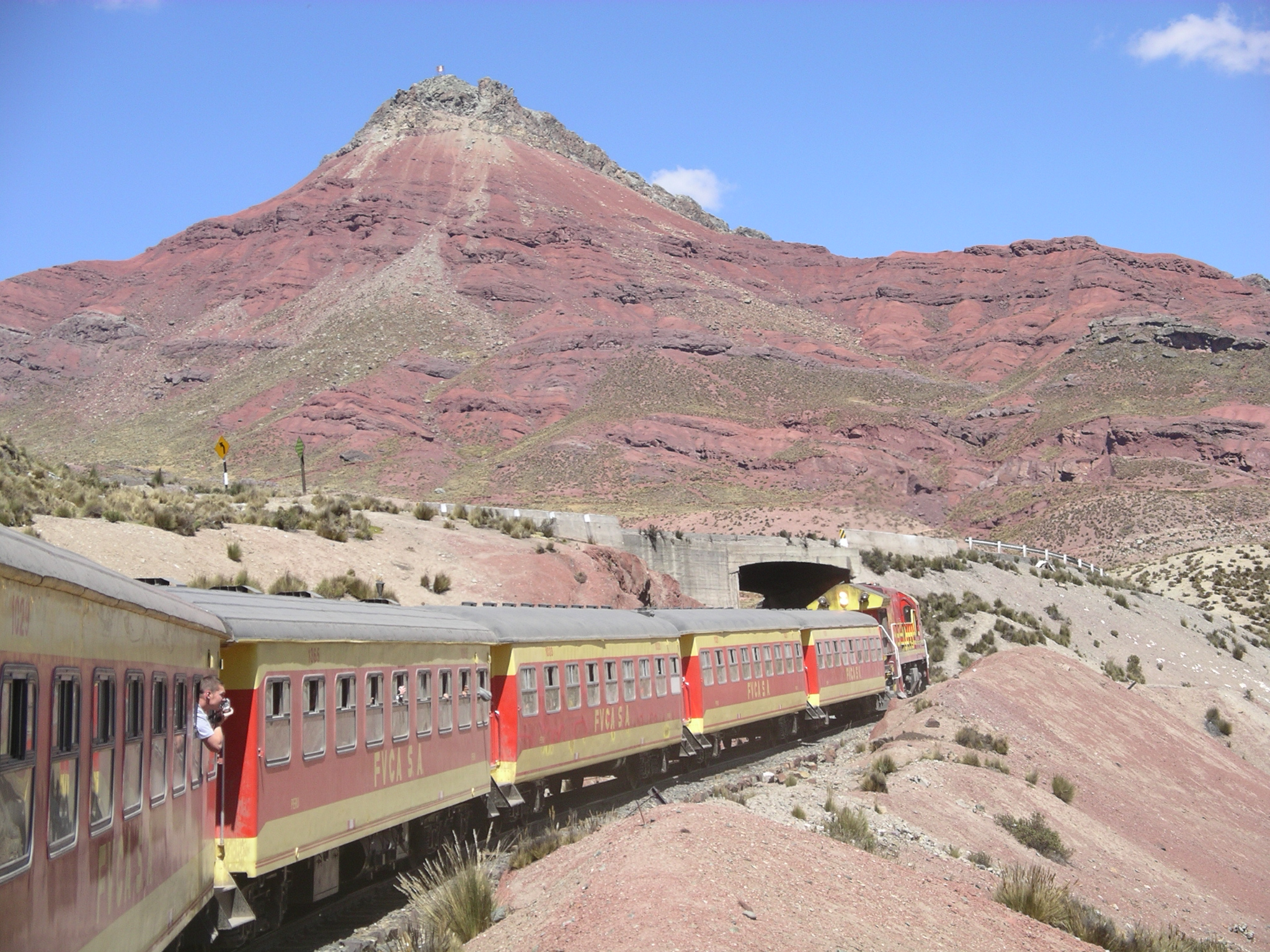
- Ferrocarril Central Andino near Antikuna pass

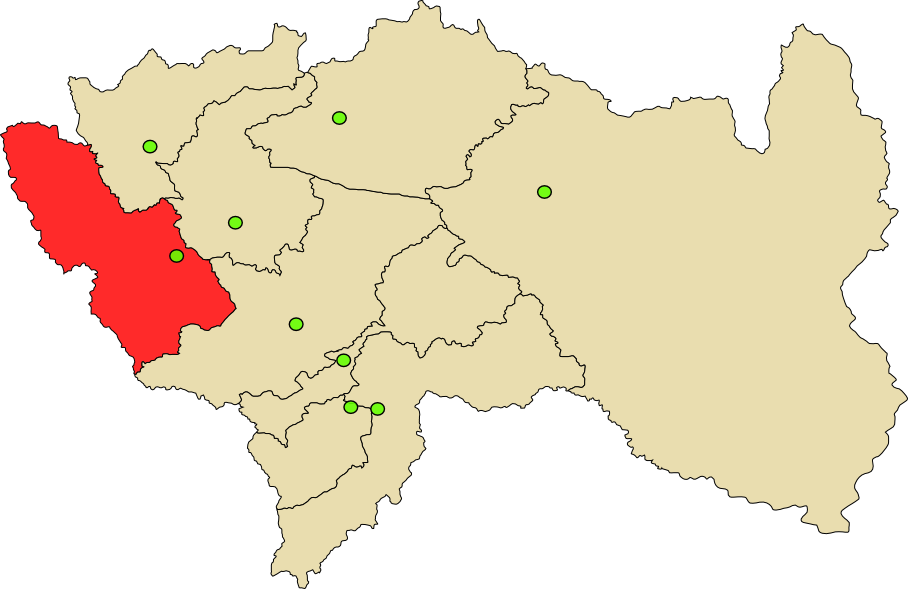
- Location of Yauli in the Junín Region
- Country: Peru
- Region: Junín
- Capital: La Oroya

Government
  - Mayor: Saturnino Mc Gerson Camargo Zavala (2019-2022)

Area
  - Total: 3,617.35 km^{2} (1,396.67 sq mi)

Population
  - Total: 40,390
  - Density: 11.17/km^{2} (28.92/sq mi)
- UBIGEO: 1208

Yauli is one of the nine provinces in Peru that form the Junín Region. It is bordered to the north by the Pasco Region and the province of Junín, to the east by the province of Tarma, to the south by the province of Jauja and to the west by the Lima Region. The population of the province was estimated at 66,093 inhabitants in 2002. The capital of the province is La Oroya.

== Geography ==
The Paryaqaqa and Puwaq Hanka mountain ranges traverse the province. Some of the highest mountains of the province are listed below:

- Allpa Marka
- Allqay
- Alma Waqana
- Anta Q'asa
- Anta Wallqan
- Antikuna
- Atuq Wachanan
- Chakra
- Challwaqucha
- Chinchay Kancha
- Chinchirusa
- Chumpi
- Chunta
- Chuntas
- Chupa Pata
- Chhuqu P'ukru
- Ch'uychu
- Ch'uyku
- Hanka Pata
- Hatun Uqhu
- Hatun Waqya
- Hirka Kancha
- Inka Waqanan
- Jitpa
- Kashpi
- Killa Wañunan
- Kimanqucha
- Kiwyu Waqanan
- Kunkash
- Kunkus
- Kunkus (Yauli)
- Kuntur Mach'ay
- Kuntur Puñuna
- Kuntur Sinqa
- Kuntur Wayin
- Lashwal
- Lichiqucha
- Lichiqucha (Chi.-Ya.)
- Liyunqucha
- Llaksa
- Llaksha Marka
- Llank'i
- Marayniyuq
- Miqlla
- Mishipa Ñawin
- Mit'u
- Mit'u Kasha
- Muruqucha
- Liyunqucha
- Ñuñu
- Pachanqutu
- Panapa Shapran
- Paraqti
- Pata Wayin
- Pillu
- Pinkuylluyuq
- Piñiqucha
- Puka Kancha
- Puka Mach'ay
- Puka Rumi
- Pukaqucha
- Putaqa
- Putka
- Phiruru
- Phiwicha
- P'itiqucha
- Qallas
- Qarwa Punta
- Qarwachuku
- Qayqu
- Qiwllaqucha
- Quchayuq
- Qullpa P'iti
- Qullpayuq
- Qullqi Mach'ay
- Qunchupata
- Quri
- Quri Wayi
- Quriqucha
- Qhaqru
- Ranra
- Ranra Mach'ay
- Ranti Kancha
- Rajuntay
- Shawaq
- Shira
- Sillaqaqa
- Suyruqucha
- Shaywa
- Tampu
- Tukumach'ay
- Ukhu Qhata
- Uqhu (Marcap.)
- Uqhu (Yauli)
- Wallakancha
- Waman Marka
- Waman Marka (La Oroya)
- Wamanripa
- Wankash
- Waqraqucha
- Waqrash
- Warmiqucha
- Warmis
- Wayllakancha
- Wayrakancha
- Wiskas
- Yana Kancha
- Yana Qaqa
- Yana Ulla
- Yana Uqsha
- Yana Wachuku
- Yanasinqa
- Yanta Pallana
- Yantayuq
- Yawarqucha
- Yuraq Allpa
- Yuraq Anka
- Yuraq Chaka
- Yuraqqucha (Lima-Junín)
- Yuraqqucha (Yauli)

Some of the largest lakes of the province are Llaksaqucha, Markapumaqucha, Markaqucha, Pumaqucha, Putkaqucha, P'ukruqucha, Tuqtuqucha, Waqraqucha, Waskhaqucha (Carhuacayan) and Waskhaqucha (Morococha).

== Political division ==
The province of Yauli is divided into ten districts:

- Chacapalpa (Chacapalpa)
- Huay-Huay (Huay-Huay)
- La Oroya (La Oroya)
- Marcapomacocha (Marcapomacocha)
- Morococha (Nueva Morococha)
- Paccha (Paccha)
- Santa Barbara de Carhuacayan (Santa Barbara de Carhuacayan)
- Santa Rosa de Sacco (Santa Rosa de Sacco)
- Suitucancha (Suitucancha)
- Yauli (Yauli)

== Archaeology ==
The archaeological site of Iskuqucha was declared a National Cultural Heritage in 2010.
