= Rajuntay =

Mountain in Peru

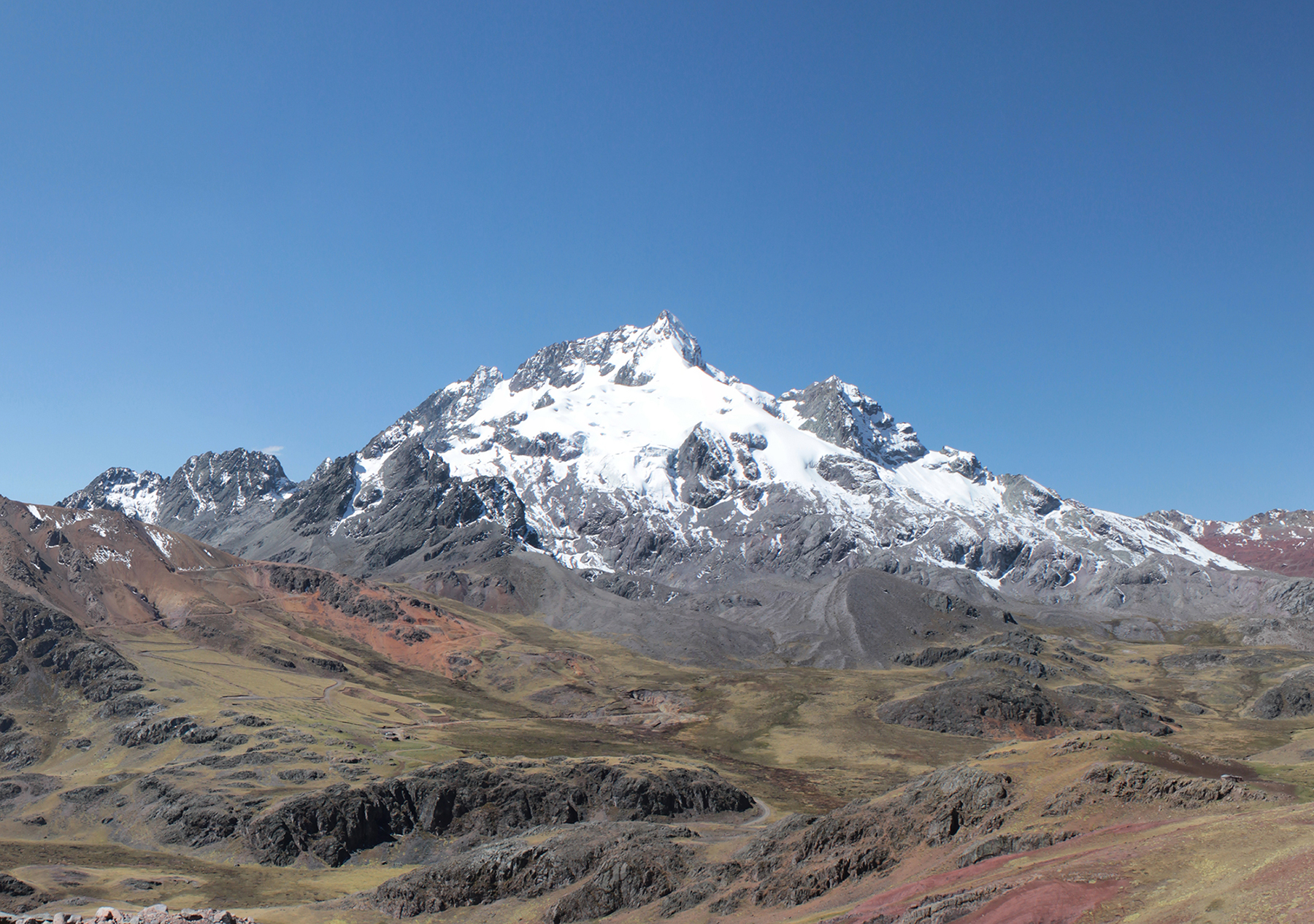
- West Face, Rajuntay, Aug 2014

Highest point
- Elevation: 5,477 m (17,969 ft)
- Prominence: 772 m (2,533 ft)
- Coordinates: 11°32′27.31″S 76°14′47.36″W

Geography
- Location within Peru
- Location: Peru, Junin Region
- Parent range: Andes, La Viuda mountain range

Climbing
- First ascent: 1900
- Easiest route: glacier/snow/ice climb

Rajuntay is a mountain of the Andes mountain range in central Peru, part of the Andes. It is 5,477 metres (17,969 ft) tall.

The name means coupled snow. It is also called Raujunte.

== See also ==
- List of mountains in the Andes
