= Chumpe (Junín) =

Mountain in Peru

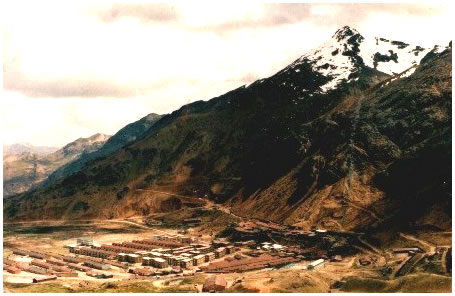
- Chumpe and the mining village of San Cristóbal

Highest point
- Elevation: 5,200 m (17,100 ft)
- Coordinates: 11°44′00″S 76°02′30″W

Geography
- Location within Peru
- Location: Peru, Junín Region
- Parent range: Andes, Pariacaca

Chumpe (possibly from chumpi, Jaqaru for corn with yellow seeds and Quechua for belt; or ch'umpi, Jaqaru for red and Quechua for brown) is a mountain in the north of the Pariacaca mountain range in the Andes of Peru, about 5,200 metres (17,060 ft) high. It is situated in the Junín Region, Yauli Province, in the districts of Huay-Huay and Yauli District. Chumpe lies east of Lake Pumacocha. The mining town of San Cristóbal is situated at its feet.
