= Quriqucha (Junín) =

Mountain in Peru

- Location within Peru

Highest point
- Elevation: 5,000 m (16,000 ft)
- Coordinates: 11°34′06″S 76°17′21″W

Geography
- Location: Peru, Junín Region
- Parent range: Andes

Quriqucha (Quechua quri gold, qucha lake, "gold lake", Hispanicized spelling Curicocha) is a mountain in the Andes of Peru, about 5,000 metres (16,404 ft) high. It is located in the Junín Region, Yauli Province, Marcapomacocha District. It lies west of Anta Q'asa and Sillaqaqa and north of Qunchupata.
