= Uqhu (Yauli) =

Mountain in Peru

- Location within Peru

Highest point
- Elevation: 5,200 m (17,100 ft)
- Coordinates: 11°47′16″S 76°3′47″W

Geography
- Location: Peru, Junín Region
- Parent range: Andes, Paryaqaqa

Uqhu (Quechua for swamp, Hispanicized spelling Uco) or Ukhu (Quechua for deep) is a mountain in the Paryaqaqa mountain range in the Andes of Peru, about 5,200 metres (17,060 ft) high. It is situated in the Junín Region, Yauli Province, Yauli District. Uqhu lies east of a lake named Wallaqucha (Huallacocha).
