= Yuraqqucha (Yauli) =

Mountain in Peru

- Location within Peru

Highest point
- Elevation: 5,022 m (16,476 ft)
- Coordinates: 11°29′57″S 76°07′47″W

Geography
- Location: Peru, Junín Region, Yauli Province
- Parent range: Andes

Yuraqqucha (Quechua yuraq white, qucha lake, "white lake", Hispanicized spelling Yuraccocha) is a 5,022-metre-high (16,476 ft) mountain in the Andes of Peru near a small lake of the same name. It is located in the Junín Region, Yauli Province, Morococha District, northeast of the peak of Challwaqucha.

The mountain is named after a little lake northwest of it at 11°29′38″S 76°08′39″W.
