= Carhuachuco =

Mountain in Peru

- Location within Peru

Highest point
- Elevation: 5,507 m (18,068 ft)
- Coordinates: 11°51′08″S 76°3′18″W

Geography
- Location: Peru, Junín Region
- Parent range: Andes, Pariacaca

Carhuachuco (possibly from Quechua qarwa yellowish, chuku hat) is a mountain in the Pariacaca mountain range in the Andes of Peru, about 5,507 metres (18,068 ft) high. It is situated in the Junín Region, Yauli Province, in the districts Suitucancha and Yauli. Carhuachuco lies south of the mountain Putka and south-west of the lake Putkaqucha.
