= Inka Kancha =

Mountain in Peru

- Location within Peru

Highest point
- Elevation: 5,146 m (16,883 ft)
- Coordinates: 11°34′57″S 76°14′27″W

Geography
- Location: Peru, Lima Region
- Parent range: Andes

Inka Kancha (Quechua Inka Inca, kancha enclosure; corral, "Inca enclosure" or "Inca corral", Hispanicized spelling Incacancha) is a 5,146-metre-high (16,883 ft) mountain in the Andes of Peru. It is situated in the Lima Region, Huarochiri Province, Chicla District. Inka Kancha lies near the Antikuna mountain pass, south of Sillaqaqa.
