= Putka (Junín) =

Mountain in Peru

- Location within Peru

Highest point
- Elevation: 5,300 m (17,400 ft)
- Coordinates: 11°49′46″S 76°02′47″W

Geography
- Location: Peru, Junín Region
- Parent range: Andes, Paryaqaqa

Putka (Jauja Quechua for "muddy", also spelled Putca) is a mountain in the Paryaqaqa mountain range in the Andes of Peru, about 5,300 metres (17,388 ft) high. It is located in the Junín Region, Yauli Province, in the districts of Suitucancha and Yauli, north of Qarwachuku.

The largest lake south of Putka is named Putkaqucha (Quechua for "muddy lake", also spelled Putcacocha). One of the small lakes southeast of Putka is named Putkaqucha, too. It lies at 11°50′28″S 76°01′45″W.
