= Lake Pumacocha (Yauli) =

- Location within Peru
- Location: Peru; Junín Region
- Coordinates: 11°44′21″S 76°06′48″W
- Max. length: 5.44 km (3.38 mi)
- Max. width: 0.95 km (0.59 mi)
- Surface elevation: 4,265 m (13,993 ft)

Pumacocha Dam
- Location within Peru
- Country: Peru

Dam and spillways
- Height: 24 m (79 ft)
- Length: 410 m (1,350 ft)

Reservoir
- Total capacity: 28,400,000 m^{3} (23,000 acre⋅ft)

Power Station
- Operator: Centromín Perú

Pumacocha (possibly from Quechua puma cougar, puma, qucha lake,) is a lake in Peru located in the Junín Region, Yauli Province, Yauli District. It is situated at a height of approximately 4,265 m (13,993 ft), about 5.144 km long and 0.95 km at its widest point. Pumacocha lies northwest of a lake named Huallacocha (possibly from in Quechua Wallaqucha) and southwest of the town of Yauli.

The Pumacocha dam was completed in 1942. It is 410 m (1,350 ft) long and 24 m (26 yd) high. It is operated by Centromín Perú. The reservoir has a volume of 438,000 m^{3} (355 acre⋅ft) and a capacity of 28,400,000 m^{3} (23,000 acre⋅ft).

== See also ==
- List of lakes in Peru
