= Yuraqqucha (Lima-Junín) =

Mountain in Peru

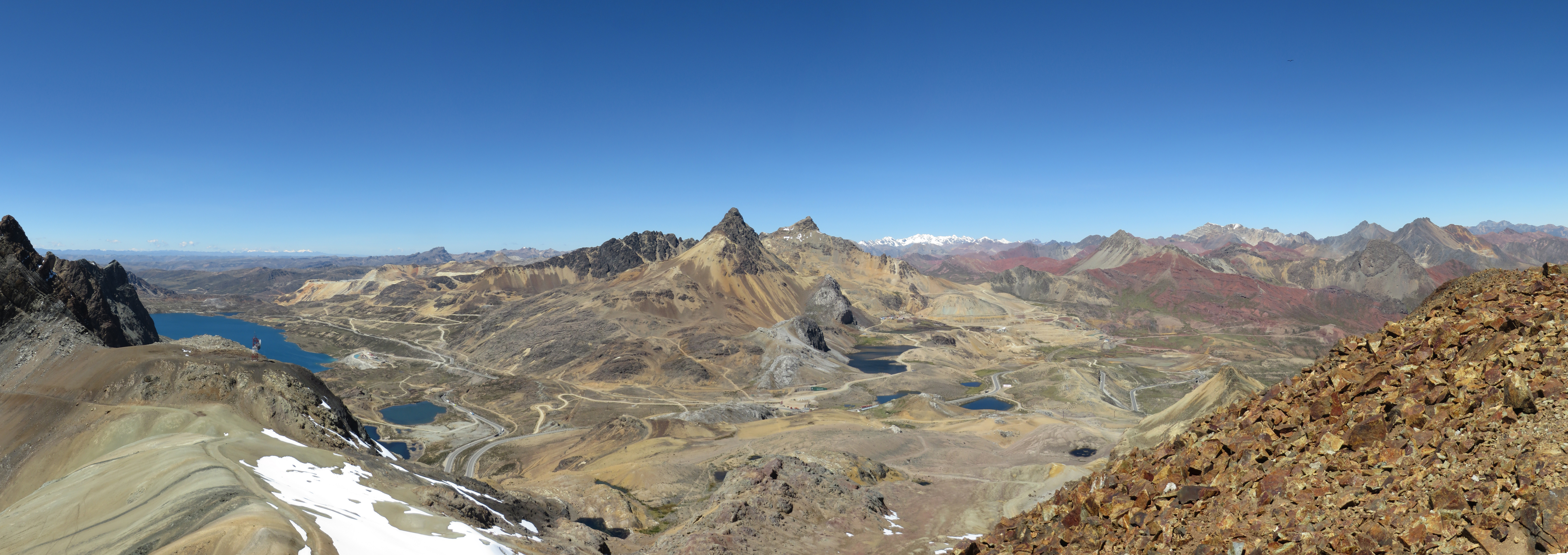
- View from the summit of Yuraqqucha showing the lake named Waqraqucha on the left (looking to the southeast)

Highest point
- Elevation: 5,100 m (16,700 ft)
- Coordinates: 11°34′26″S 76°13′7″W

Geography
- Location within Peru
- Location: Peru, Lima Region, Junín Region
- Parent range: Andes

Yuraqqucha (Quechua yuraq white, qucha lake, "white lake", Hispanicized spelling Yuraccocha) is a mountain in the Andes of Peru, about 5,100 metres (16,732 ft) high. It is located in the Junín Region, Yauli Province, Morococha District, and in the Lima Region, Huarochirí Province, Chicla District. Yuraqqucha lies northwest of a lake named Waqraqucha, the Antikuna mountain pass and the peak of Antikuna. Anta Q'asa, Sillaqaqa, Inka Kancha and Pukaqucha are situated west, southwest and northwest of Yuraqqucha.

The mountain is named after a little lake south of it. It lies in the Chicla District at 11°35′3″S 76°12′49″W.
