= Lake Marcapomacocha =

Lake in Peru

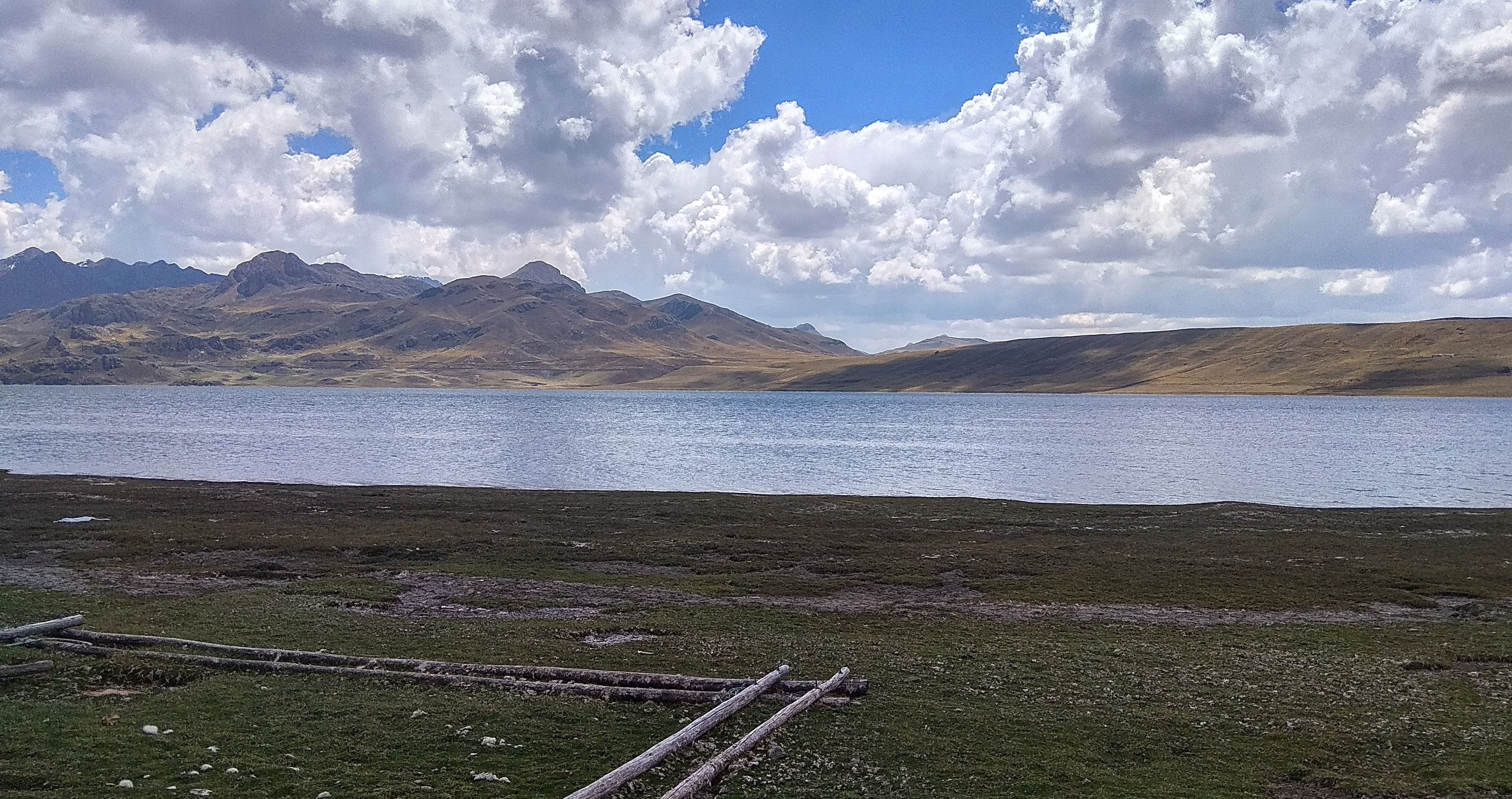

- Location within Peru
- Location: Junín Region
- Coordinates: 11°24′04″S 76°20′50″W
- Catchment area: 141 km^{2} (54 sq mi)
- Basin countries: Peru
- Max. length: 3.67 km (2.28 mi)
- Max. width: 1.95 km (1.21 mi)
- Surface elevation: 4,400 m (14,400 ft)

Lake Marcapomacocha (possibly from Quechua marka village, puma cougar, puma, qucha lake) is a lake in Peru. It is located in the Junín Region, Yauli Province, Marcapomacocha District. Lake Marcapomacocha lies south of Lake Marcacocha and east of Lake Antacota. It is situated at a height of about 4,400 metres (14,436 ft), about 3.67 km long and 1.95 km at its widest point. It has a catchment area of 141 square kilometres (54 sq mi).

== Ecology ==
The area where Lake Marcapomacocha is located is important for the breeding of the andean goose, the crested duck and the giant coot. Bogs in the area are home to the rare diademed sandpiper-plover. The rainbow trout has become a naturalized species in the lake.

== Environmental threats ==
The most important threats to the lake are the excessive hunting and the manipulation of water levels.

== See also ==
- Aququcha
- List of lakes in Peru
