= Cajamarca–Cañaris Quechua =

Quechua varieties of Peru

- Cajamarca–Lambayeque Quechua
- Kichwa, Runashimi
- Native to: Peru
- Native speakers: (50,000 cited 1998–2003) plus a few hundred to few thousand Lincha
- Language family: Quechua: Quechua II?; Northern Peruvian; Cajamarca–Cañaris Quechua
- Dialects: Ferreñafe (Cañaris); Cajamarca; Lincha

Language codes
- ISO 639-3: Variously: qvc – Cajamarca Quechua quf – Lambayeque Quechua qux – (partial) Lincha Quechua
- Glottolog: caja1238 Cajamarca lamb1276 Lambayeque tana1291 Tana-Lincha
- ELP: Lincha Quechua

Cajamarca–Cañaris Quechua (locally called Kichwa or Runashimi, like other Quechua varieties) is a branch of Quechua spoken in northern Peru, consisting primarily of Cajamarca Quechua (Kashamarka, also known as Linwa), and Lambayeque Quechua (also known as Ferreñafe, Inkawasi-Kañaris Quechua), spoken in the Cajamarca and Lambayeque regions near the towns of Cajamarca and Cañaris. Cajamarca and Lambayeque Quechua share 94% lexical similarity and are mutually intelligible. Adelaar (2004) includes the dialect of Lincha District, far to the south on the border of the Lima and Huancavelica regions.

Cajamarca–Cañaris Quechua is divergent from other varieties; although traditionally classified as a member of Quechua II-A, some (Adelaar) believe it to be a primary branch of Quechua II, and others (Landerman, Taylor, Heggarty) analyze it as not straightforwardly classifiable within the traditional QI vs. QII schema at all, and thus potentially a primary branch of its own. Félix Quesada published the first grammar and dictionary in 1976.

According to the UNESCO World Atlas of Languages in Danger, Cajamarca Quechua is severely endangered.

== Bibliography ==
- Félix Quesada C. (1976): Diccionario Quechua de Cajamarca-Cañaris [– Castellano y vice versa]. Ministerio de educación del Perú
- David Coombs et al. (2003): Rimashun kichwapi: Hablemos en quechua
- Marco A. Arana Zegarra (2002): Resolución de Conflictos Medioambientales en la Microcuenca del Río Porcón, Cajamarca 1993-2002. Thesis 2002, Pontífica Universidad Católica del Perú.
- Ronel Groenewald et al. (2002): Shumaq liyinawan yaĉakushun – Aprendamos con los cuentos bonitos
