= Cajamarca Quechua =

Quechua variety of Peru

- Kashamarka Runashimi
- Native to: Peru
- Native speakers: (30,000 cited 2000)
- Language family: Quechua: Quechua II; North Peruvian; Cajamarca Quechua

Language codes
- ISO 639-3: qvc
- Glottolog: caja1238
- ELP: Cajamarca Quechua
- Linguasphere: 84-FAA-db

Cajamarca Quechua is a variety of Quechua spoken in the districts of Chetilla, Baños del Inca and Cajamarca (Porcón) in the Peruvian province of Cajamarca, along the northwest coast of Peru.

It was never spoken throughout the Cajamarca Department, where other indigenous languages like Kulyi, Jivaroan, or Mochica were spoken.

Cajamarca Quechua is severely endangered, as hardly any children are now learning it.

Cajamarca Quechua belongs to Quechua II, subgroup Cajamarca–Cañaris (Quechua II a, Yunkay) and is closest to Lambayeque Quechua, with which it has 94% lexical similarity. Félix Quesada published the first grammar and dictionary in 1976.

== Phonology ==
There are three vowels: /a, i, u/

Consonants
		Bilabial	Alveolar	Alveolo-palatal	Retroflex	Palatal	Velar	Uvular
Stop		p	t				k	q
Affricate	voiceless			t͡ʃ	ʈʂ			
Affricate	voiced			d͡ʒ				
Fricative	voiceless		s	ʃ	ʂ		x	
Fricative	voiced				ʐ			
Nasal		m	n			ɲ		
Approximant			l			j	w	
Flap			ɾ					

== Bibliography ==
- Félix Quesada C. (1976): Diccionario Quechua de Cajamarca–Cañaris [–Castellano y vice versa]. Ministerio de educación del Perú.
- Félix Quesada C. (1976): Gramática quechua, Cajamarca-Cañaris. Ministerio de educación del Perú.
- David Coombs et al. (2003): Rimashun kichwapi: Hablemos en quechua
- Marco A. Arana Zegarra (2002): Resolución de Conflictos Medioambientales en la Microcuenca del Río Porcón, Cajamarca 1993-2002. Thesis 2002, Pontífica Universidad Católica del Perú.
- Ronel Groenewald et al. (2002): Shumaq liyinawan yaĉakushun - Aprendamos con los cuentos bonitos
