= Chetilla District =

Coordinates: 7.1463°S 78.6759°W

Chetilla
- District
- Interactive map of Chetilla
- Country: Peru
- Region: Cajamarca
- Province: Cajamarca
- Founded: January 2, 1857
- Capital: Chetilla

Government
  - Mayor: Israel Mendoza Tomay

Area
  - Total: 73.94 km^{2} (28.55 sq mi)
- Elevation: 2,790 m (9,150 ft)

Population (2005 census)
  - Total: 4,137
  - Density: 55.95/km^{2} (144.9/sq mi)
- Time zone: UTC-5 (PET)
- UBIGEO: 060103

Chetilla District is one of twelve districts of the province Cajamarca in Peru.

Along with Porcón (Cajamarca District) and Los Baños del Inca but in contrast to the rest of the Cajamarca Region, Chetilla is a traditional Quechua-speaking area. However, Cajamarca Quechua is under strong pressure from Spanish.
