= Ventanillas de Otuzco =

Archaeological site in Peru

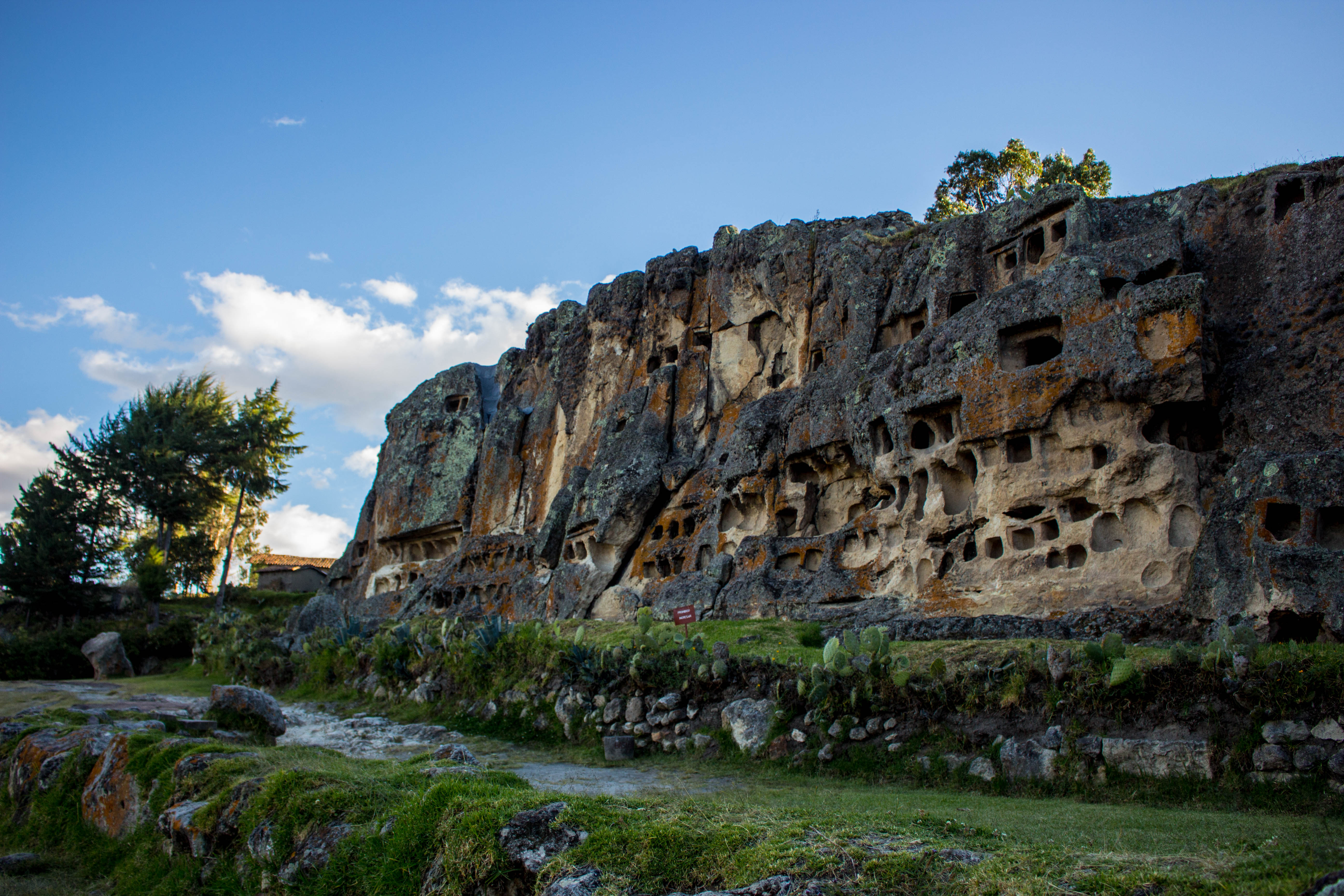
- Partial view of the archaeological site.

- Location within Peru
- 7°07′33″S 78°27′28″W
- Type: Settlement
- Periods: Early Intermediate
- Cultures: Chavín – Moche
- Location: Los Baños del Inca District, Cajamarca Province

Ventanillas de Otuzco are a Peruvian archaeological site located in the district of Baños del Inca, 8 km northwest of the city of Cajamarca.

== Location ==
It is located near the Otuzco village in Baños del Inca District 8 kilometres (5.0 mi) northeast of the city of Cajamarca. The site is located on volcanic rock, covering an area of about 1,700 square metres (18,000 sq ft).

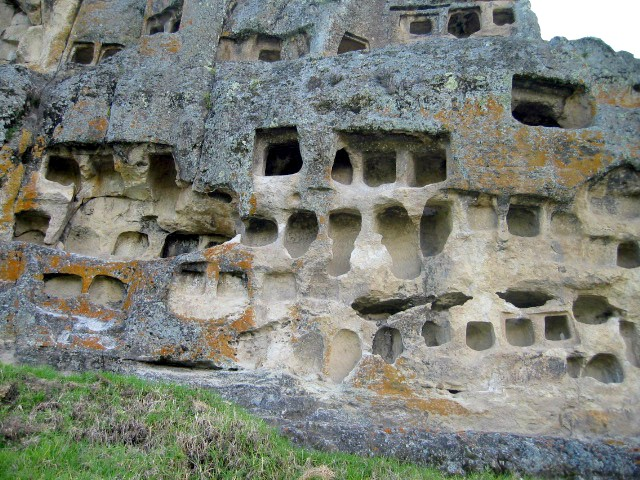
Detail of the archaeological site.

== Chronology ==
It has an antiquity of 300BCE - 200CE of the Early Intermediate period.

== Sources ==
Ponce, Victor Miguel (Winter 2009), "The Necropolis of Otuzco, Northern Peru", South American Explorer (89), archived from the original on 25 January 2014
