= Absalón Vásquez =

Peruvian agricultural engineer, university professor and Fujimorist politician

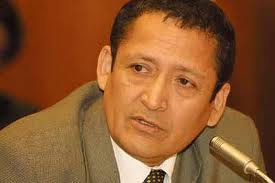
- Vásquez in 2014

Senator of the Republic
- Incumbent
- Assumed office 26 July 2026
- Preceded by: Rafael López Aliaga
- Constituency: Nationwide

Member of Congress
- In office 26 July 2000 – 26 July 2001
- Constituency: Nationwide

Minister of Agriculture
- In office 6 April 1992 – 3 April 1996
- President: Alberto Fujimori
- Preceded by: Gustavo González Prieto
- Succeeded by: Rodolfo Muñante Sanguinetti

Personal details
- Born: Absalón Vásquez Villanueva; 2 March 1950 (age 76) Jesús, Cajamarca, Cajamarca, Peru
- Party: RP (since 2025)
- Other political affiliations: APRA (1988–1991); Cambio 90 (1991–1997); MIVV (1997–2004); Sí Cumple (2004–2010); Podemos Perú (2017–2020)
- Education: National Agrarian University - La Molina
- Occupation: Engineer • Politician

Absalón Vásquez Villanueva (born 2 March 1950) is a Peruvian agricultural engineer, university professor and Fujimorist politician. He has served as Vice-Minister of Natural Resources and Rural Development and as Vice Minister of Agriculture. Additionally, he was Minister of Agriculture from 1992 to 1996, the longest term in Peru’s history, during the government of Alberto Fujimori. Later he was elected as a Congressman in 2000 under the Peru 2000 ticket. In 2014, he ran for the Governorship of the Department of Cajamarca under the Cajamarca Siempre Verde movement, coming in third place with 12.6% of the votes.

He is currently a candidate for the Peruvian Senate under Popular Renewal.

== Early life and education ==
He was born in Jesús District, Cajamarca, Cajamarca Province, Cajamarca Department. He studied agricultural engineering in the National Agrarian University, where he later completed a master’s degree in Water and Land Resources Engineering. In 2012 he finished a doctorate in Water Resources with the highest grade in the entire university.

== Political career ==
Vásquez began his political career in 1988, when he was named a vice-minister in the first government of Alan García, a role from which he resigned in 1989. He was again appointed Vice-Minister in the first government of Alberto Fujimori and fulfilled this role from 1991 to 1992. At that time, he was elected Minister of Agriculture and occupied this position until 1996. After 1996, he served as a presidential advisor in agricultural issues until 2000. In 2000, he was then elected to Congress under the Peru 2000 ticket with more than 700,000 votes.

=== Candidacies for the regional governor of Cajamarca ===
- He ran in 2010 for the role of regional governor of Cajamarca under the Cajamarca Siempre Verde movement; nevertheless, he would be withdrawn from the political contest because he had no official residency in Cajamarca.
- In 2014, he again ran for regional governor of Cajamarca under the Cajamarca Siempre Verde movement, this time achieving third place with more than 12% of valid votes.
- In 2018, he ran for the third time for regional governor of Cajamarca with the Podemos Perú party, taking fourth place with 11% of votes.

=== Controversies ===
Absalón Vásquez has been accused of various crimes of corruption rooted in his involvement with the Fujimorist government of the 1990s. In 2008, he was sentenced to seven years in prison when he was found responsible for massive forgery of signatures for the Vamos Vecino party, a group that supported the reelection of Alberto Fujimori, for which he would later receive a habeas corpus. Nevertheless, after a short time he was acquitted by the Supreme Court with a favorable opinion from the Supreme Attorney. In 2013, he was absolved in a courtroom presided by judge Villa Stein for the case of the “Vladipoles”, in which he was accused of misusing funds for the purchase of propaganda materials supporting Fujimori’s reelection

== Main works ==
- He established a system of tariff surcharge for food imports coming from countries that subsidize their producers, with the goal of protecting national producers from unfair competition.
- He corrected the collectivism of in the property held by Peruvian sugar-producing companies, through Legislative Decree 802, also called the Sugar Cooperative Economic & Financial Restructuring Law.
- He was an integral part of the team that created the National Program of Soil and Water Conservation, later called PRONAMACHS. This was a project supporting rural development in the high Andes zones of Perú.

== Awards and honors ==
- 2011, First in Class, Doctorate Degree in Water Resource Engineering
- 1997, Honorary Doctorate at the Universidad de San Martín de Porres
- 1977, First in Class, Master’s Degree in Water and Land Resource Engineering

== Publications ==
- Cosecha de Agua de Lluvia en Laderas Semiáridas de la Sierra y su Impacto en el Proceso de Desertificación y Cambio Climático. UNALM “La Molina”. 2012.
- Cuantificación de la Erosión Hídrica en la Sierra Peruana. UNALM “La Molina”. 2012
- Principios Básicos del Riego. UNALM “La Molina”. 2012.
- Manejo de Cuencas Altoandinas Tomo I y II. UNALM “La Molina”. II Edición. 2000.
- Manejo de Cuencas Hidrográficas Altoandinas. UNALM “La Molina”. I Edición. 1998.
- Desarrollo Agrario: Antecedentes y Propuesta de Política para el Siglo XXI. UNALM “La Molina”. 1999.
- Industria Azucarera Peruana. Balance y Perspectivas. UNALM “La Molina”. 1997.
- Política Agraria para un Desarrollo Sostenido del Agro Peruano. MINAG. 1994.
- Modelo de Programación de Riegos en el Cultivo de la Caña de Azúcar en el Perú. ICIA – Trujillo. 1978.
- Investigación de Operaciones y aplicación de la Ingeniería de Sistemas en el aprovechamiento de los Recursos Hídricos. ICIA – Trujillo. 1979.
- Modelo de Pronóstico de Riegos en el cultivo de la Caña de Azúcar, ICIA- Trujillo. 1979.
- Manual del Riego del Cultivo de la Caña de Azúcar en el Perú, ICIA – Trujillo. 1980.
- Manual de Conservación de Suelos. Convenio Perú – AID, MINAG-AID. 1983.
- Manual de Rehabilitación de Andenes Incaicos UNALM “La Molina”. 1984.
- Evolución del Impacto Socio Económico de la Conservación de Suelos y Aguas en la Sierra Peruana, MINAG – AID. 1985.
- Publicación de Varios trabajos de Investigación en el ISSCT (International Society Sugar Cane Technologist). 1976 – 1981.
