= Encañada District =

Coordinates: 7.0859°S 78.3467°W

Encañada
- District
- Interactive map of Encañada
- Country: Peru
- Region: Cajamarca
- Province: Cajamarca
- Founded: January 02, 1857
- Capital: Encañada

Government
  - Mayor: Lifoncio Vera Sanchez

Area
  - Total: 635.06 km^{2} (245.20 sq mi)
- Elevation: 3,098 m (10,164 ft)

Population (2005 census)
  - Total: 22,397
  - Density: 35.268/km^{2} (91.342/sq mi)
- Time zone: UTC-5 (PET)
- UBIGEO: 060105

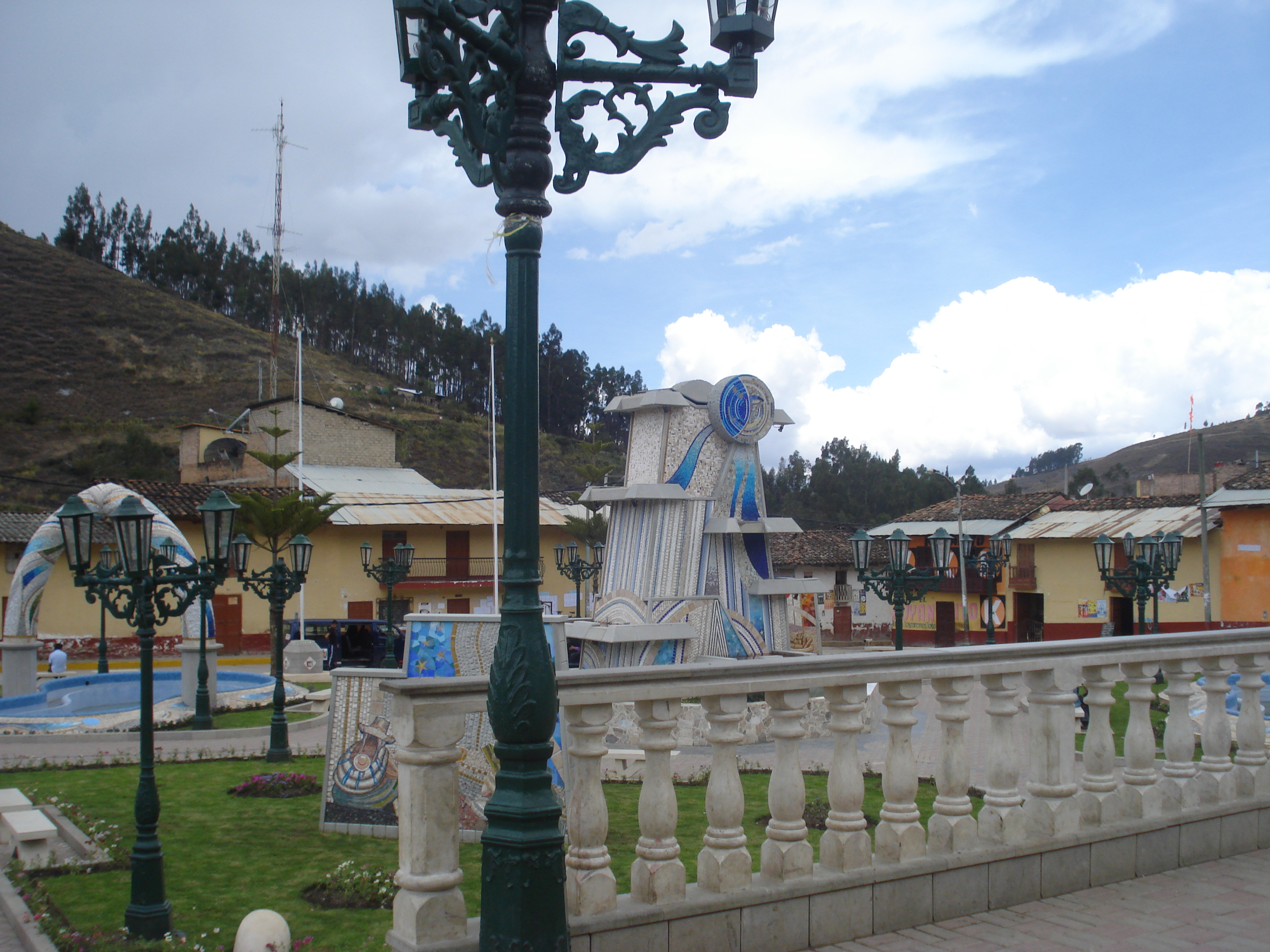
Main park of La Encañada in Cajamarca.

Encañada District is one of twelve districts of the Cajamarca Province in Peru.

== Geography ==
One of the highest elevations of the district is the Llusk'a Qullpa mountain range at approximately 4,000 m (13,000 ft) on the border with the Namora District. Other mountains are listed below:

- Allqay Wasi
- Chukuri
- Kampanayuq
- Kinwa
- Kinwa Pampa
- Kinwayuq
- Kiswar
- K'uchu Urqu
- Maki Maki
- Suyt'u Rumi
- Usnu
- Wachwa
- Wachwa Pampa
- Waka Qucha
- Wisk'acha
- Yana Qucha
- Yana T'utura

== See also ==
- Mamaqucha
