= Ventanilla =

Ventanilla (Spanish for "little window") may refer to:

- Ventanilla, a feature in Philippine architecture
- La Ventanilla, Oaxaca, a village in Santa María Tonameca, Oaxaca, Mexico
- Ventanilla District, a district of Callao, Peru
- Ventanillas de Otuzco, an archaeological site in Peru
