= Qiwllaqucha =

Qiwllaqucha or Qillwaqucha (Quechua qillwa, qiwlla gull, qucha lake, "gull lake", also spelled Cceullaccoha, Cceullaccocha, Cceullacocha, Jelluacocha, Jelluajocha, Jeullacocha, Jeullajocha, Quellhuaccocha, Quellhuacocha, Quelluaccocha, Quelluacocha, Queulacocha, Queullaccocha, Queullacocha, Quiulaccocha, Quiulacocha, Quiullaccocha, Quiullacocha, also Keullacocha) may refer to:

== Lakes ==
- Qiwllaqucha (Abancay), a lake in the Abancay Province, Apurímac Region, Peru
- Qillwaqucha (Cajamarca), a lake at a village of the same name in the Cajamarca Region, Peru
- Qiwllaqucha (Cotabambas), a lake in the Cotabambas Province, Apurímac Region, Peru
- Qiwllaqucha (Dos de Mayo), a lake in the Dos de Mayo Province, Huánuco Region, Peru
- Qiwllaqucha (Huancavelica), a lake in the Huancavelica District, Huancavelica Province, Huancavelica Region, Peru
- Qiwllaqucha (Huánuco), a lake in the Huánuco Province, Huánuco Region, Peru
- Qiwllaqucha (Huarochirí), a lake in the Huarochirí Province, Lima Region, Peru
- Qiwllaqucha (Junín), a lake in the Junín Region, Peru
- Qiwllaqucha (Lima), a lake in the Yauyos Province, Lima Region, Peru

== Mountains ==
- Qiwllaqucha (Angaraes), a mountain in the Angaraes Province, Huancavelica Region, Peru
- Qiwllaqucha (Cayrán-Chaulán), a mountain on the border of the districts of Cayrán and Chaulán, Huánuco Province, Huánuco Region, Peru
- Qiwllaqucha (Chaulán), a mountain at a small lake of that name in the Chaulán District, Huánuco Province, Huánuco Region, Peru
- Qillwaqucha (Churcampa-Tayacaja), a mountain at a small lake of that name in the provinces of Churcampa and Tayacaja, Huancavelica Region, Peru
- Qiwllaqucha (Cusco), a mountain in the Cusco Region, Peru
- Qiwllaqucha (Jauja), a mountain in the Jauja Province, Junín Region, Peru
- Qiwllaqucha (Pasco), a mountain at a small lake of the same name in the Pasco Region, Peru
