= Magdalena District, Cajamarca =

Coordinates: 7.2502°S 78.6598°W

Magdalena
- District
- Interactive map of Magdalena
- Country: Peru
- Region: Cajamarca
- Province: Cajamarca
- Capital: Magdalena

Government
  - Mayor: Isaias Tarrillo Terrones

Area
  - Total: 215.38 km^{2} (83.16 sq mi)
- Elevation: 1,290 m (4,230 ft)

Population (2005 census)
  - Total: 9,075
  - Density: 42.13/km^{2} (109.1/sq mi)
- Time zone: UTC-5 (PET)
- UBIGEO: 060109

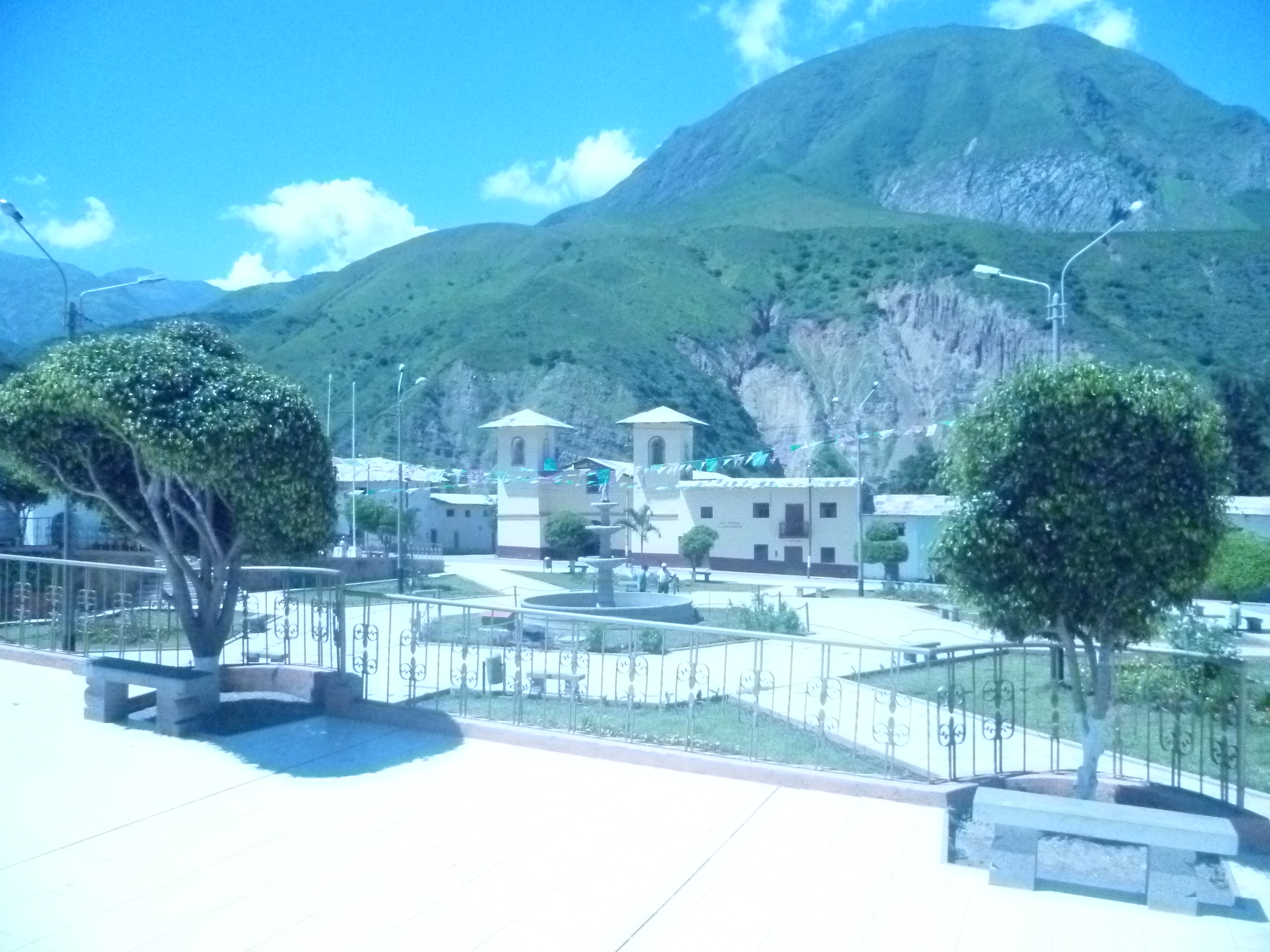
Plaza de Armas of Magdalena

Magdalena District is one of twelve districts of the province Cajamarca in Peru.
