= Cospán District =

Coordinates: 7.4273°S 78.5444°W

Cospán
- District
- Interactive map of Cospán
- Country: Peru
- Region: Cajamarca
- Province: Cajamarca
- Founded: December 14, 1870
- Capital: Cospán

Government
  - Mayor: Luciano Mendez Alcantara

Area
  - Total: 558.79 km^{2} (215.75 sq mi)
- Elevation: 2,365 m (7,759 ft)

Population (2005 census)
  - Total: 8,219
  - Density: 14.71/km^{2} (38.10/sq mi)
- Time zone: UTC-5 (PET)
- UBIGEO: 060104

Cospán District is one of twelve districts of the province Cajamarca in Peru.
