= Lambayeque Quechua =

Quechua variety of Lambayeque, Peru

- Inkawasi-Kañaris Runashimi
- Native to: Peru
- Native speakers: (20,000 cited 1998)
- Language family: Quechua: Quechua II; North Peruvian; Lambayeque Quechua

Language codes
- ISO 639-3: quf
- Glottolog: lamb1276
- ELP: Lambayeque Quechua
- Linguasphere: 84-FAA-da

Lambayeque or Inkawasi-Kañaris is a variety of Quechua spoken in the districts of Incahuasi and Cañaris, Ferreñafe in the Peruvian region of Lambayeque.

Inkawasi-Kañaris Quechua belongs to Quechua II, subgroup Cajamarca–Cañaris (Quechua II a, Yunkay) and is closest to Cajamarca Quechua, with which it has 94% lexical similarity.

== Bibliography ==
- Ronel Groenewald et al. (2002): Shumaq liyinawan yaĉakushun - Aprendamos con los cuentos bonitos
