= Lake Sulluscocha =

Lake in Peru

- Location within Peru
- Location: Peru; Cajamarca Region
- Coordinates: 7°11′35″S 78°22′28″W

Lake Sulluscocha (possibly from Quechua sullu fetus/lock made of wood, qucha lake) is a lake in Peru located in the Cajamarca Region, Cajamarca Province, Llacanora District. This is a place to watch birds.
