= San Juan District, Cajamarca =

Coordinates: 7.2916°S 78.4978°W

San Juan District
- District
- Interactive map of San Juan District
- Country: Peru
- Region: Cajamarca
- Province: Cajamarca
- Founded: April 5, 1935
- Capital: San Juan

Government
  - Mayor: Edinson Armando Teran Medina

Area
  - Total: 69.66 km^{2} (26.90 sq mi)
- Elevation: 2,311 m (7,582 ft)

Population (2005 census)
  - Total: 5,128
  - Density: 73.61/km^{2} (190.7/sq mi)
- Time zone: UTC-5 (PET)
- UBIGEO: 060112

San Juan District is one of twelve districts of the province Cajamarca in Peru.
