= Matara District, Cajamarca =

Coordinates: 7°15′30″S 78°15′10″W

Matara
- District
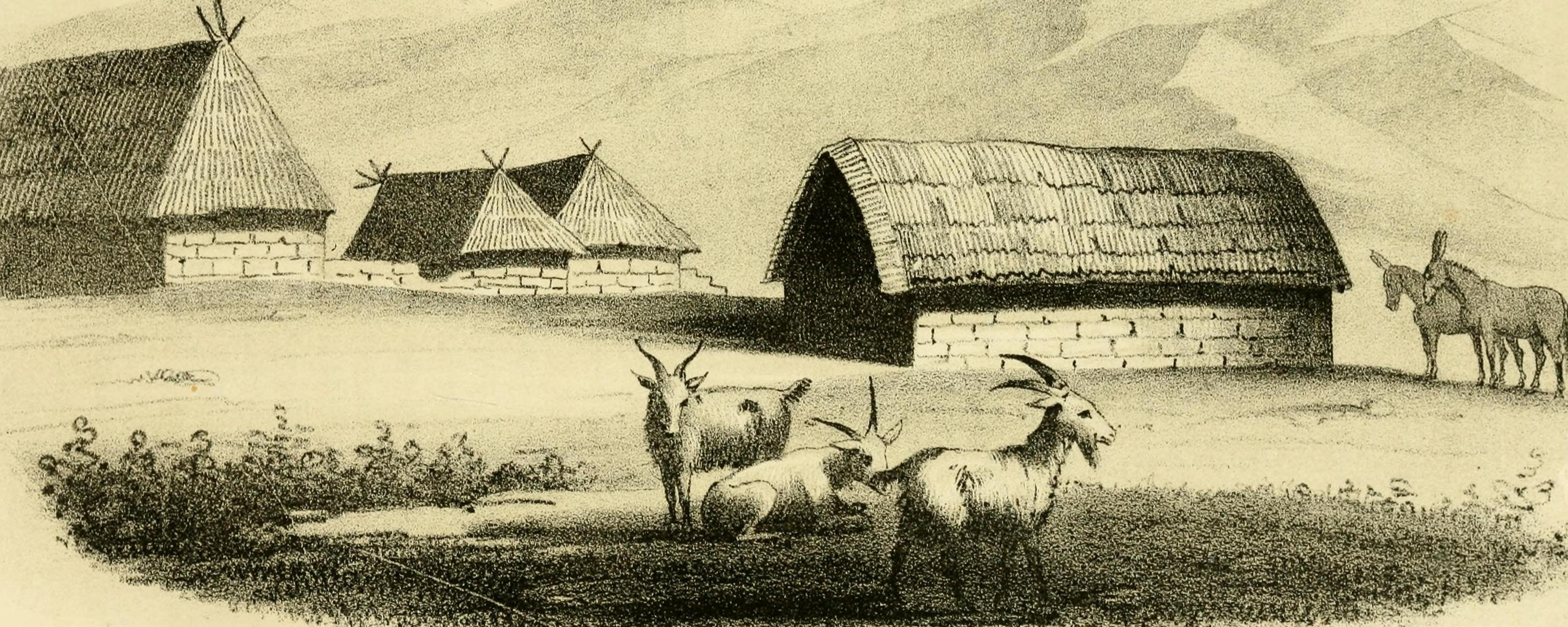
- Matara post office, ca. 1852
- Interactive map of Matara
- Country: Peru
- Region: Cajamarca
- Province: Cajamarca
- Founded: January 2, 1857
- Capital: Matara

Government
  - Mayor: Ramiro Alejandro Bardales Vigo

Area
  - Total: 59.74 km^{2} (23.07 sq mi)
- Elevation: 2,819 m (9,249 ft)

Population (2005 census)
  - Total: 3,559
  - Density: 59.57/km^{2} (154.3/sq mi)
- Time zone: UTC-5 (PET)
- UBIGEO: 060110

Matará District is one of twelve districts of the province Cajamarca in Peru.
