= Lake Mamacocha (Cajamarca) =

Lake in Peru

- Lake Yanacocha
- Location within Peru
- Location: Peru; Cajamarca Region
- Coordinates: 6°59′24″S 78°10′01″W

Lake Mamacocha (possibly from Quechua mama mother / madam / qucha lake, mama qucha ocean, Mama Qucha) or Lake Yanacocha is a lake in Peru located in Encañada District, Cajamarca Province, Cajamarca Region.
