= Asunción District, Cajamarca =

Coordinates: 7.3248°S 78.5173°W

Asunción
- District
- Interactive map of Asunción
- Country: Peru
- Region: Cajamarca
- Province: Cajamarca
- Capital: Asunción

Government
  - Mayor: Juan Cornelio Torrel Rabanal

Area
  - Total: 210.18 km^{2} (81.15 sq mi)
- Elevation: 2,229 m (7,313 ft)

Population (2005 census)
  - Total: 9,065
  - Density: 43.13/km^{2} (111.7/sq mi)
- Time zone: UTC-5 (PET)
- UBIGEO: 060102

Asunción District is one of twelve districts of the province Cajamarca in Peru.
