= Llacanora District =

Coordinates: 7.1943°S 78.4236°W

Llacanora
- District
- Interactive map of Llacanora
- Country: Peru
- Region: Cajamarca
- Province: Cajamarca
- Founded: January 2, 1857
- Capital: Llacanora

Government
  - Mayor: Roberto Llamoga Ramirez

Area
  - Total: 49.42 km^{2} (19.08 sq mi)
- Elevation: 2,606 m (8,550 ft)

Population (2005 census)
  - Total: 4,651
  - Density: 94.11/km^{2} (243.7/sq mi)
- Time zone: UTC-5 (PET)
- UBIGEO: 060107

Llacanora District is one of twelve districts of the province Cajamarca in Peru.

== See also ==
- Sulluqucha
