= Namora District =

Coordinates: 7.2029°S 78.3258°W

Namora
- District
- Interactive map of Namora
- Country: Peru
- Region: Cajamarca
- Province: Cajamarca
- Founded: August 14, 1920
- Capital: Namora

Area
  - Total: 180.69 km^{2} (69.76 sq mi)
- Elevation: 2,733 m (8,967 ft)

Population (2005 census)
  - Total: 8,552
  - Density: 47.33/km^{2} (122.6/sq mi)
- Time zone: UTC-5 (PET)
- UBIGEO: 060111

Namora District is one of twelve districts of the province Cajamarca in Peru.

== See also ==
- Qillwaqucha
- Quyllur
