= Qillwaqucha (Cajamarca) =

Lake in Peru

- Location within Peru
- Location: Peru; Cajamarca Region
- Coordinates: 7°10′20″S 78°16′40″W
- Average depth: 13.5 m (44 ft)
- Surface elevation: 3,500 m (11,500 ft)

Qillwaqucha (Quechua qillwa, qiwlla, qiwiña gull, qucha lake, "gull lake", hispanicized spelling Quelluacocha) is a lake in Peru located in the Cajamarca Region, Cajamarca Province, Namora District. It is situated at a height of about 3,500 metres (11,483 ft). The village at its eastern shore is also named Qillwaqucha (Quelluacocha).
