= Cañaris District =

Coordinates: 6.0468°S 79.2684°W

Cañaris
- District
- Interactive map of Cañaris
- Country: Peru
- Region: Lambayeque
- Province: Ferreñafe
- Founded: February 17, 1951
- Capital: Cañaris

Government
  - Mayor: Antonio Ventura Lizana

Area
  - Total: 284.88 km^{2} (109.99 sq mi)
- Elevation: 2,421 m (7,943 ft)

Population (2005 census)
  - Total: 12,691
  - Density: 44.549/km^{2} (115.38/sq mi)
- Time zone: UTC-5 (PET)
- UBIGEO: 140202

Cañaris District (Kañaris in Quechua) is one of six districts of the province Ferreñafe in Peru.

== Ethnic groups ==
The people in the district are mainly indigenous citizens of Quechua or Cañari descendants of mitimaes. Quechua Inkawasi-Kañaris Quechua) is the language which the majority of the population (63.65%) learnt to speak in childhood, 35.68% of the residents started speaking using the Spanish language (2007 Peru Census).
