= Jesús District, Cajamarca =

Coordinates: 7.2481°S 78.3845°W

Jesús
- District
- Interactive map of Jesús
- Country: Peru
- Region: Cajamarca
- Province: Cajamarca
- Capital: Jesús

Government
  - Mayor: Marco Antonio Ruiz Ortiz

Area
  - Total: 267.78 km^{2} (103.39 sq mi)
- Elevation: 2,564 m (8,412 ft)

Population (2005 census)
  - Total: 14,075
  - Density: 52.562/km^{2} (136.13/sq mi)
- Time zone: UTC-5 (PET)
- UBIGEO: 060106

Jesús District is one of twelve districts of the province Cajamarca in Peru.
