= Cajamarca District =

Coordinates: 7°10′0″S 78°31′0″W

Cajamarca
- District
- Flag Coat of arms
- Interactive map of Cajamarca
- Country: Peru
- Region: Cajamarca
- Province: Cajamarca
- Capital: Cajamarca

Government
  - Mayor: Víctor Andrés Villar Narro

Area
  - Total: 382.74 km^{2} (147.78 sq mi)
- Elevation: 2,720 m (8,920 ft)

Population (2017)
  - Total: 218,741
  - Density: 571.51/km^{2} (1,480.2/sq mi)
- Time zone: UTC-5 (PET)
- UBIGEO: 060101

Cajamarca District is one of twelve districts of the province Cajamarca in Peru.
