= Cajamarca province =

Coordinates: 7°09′25″S 78°31′03″W

Cajamarca
- Province
- Flag Coat of arms

- Location of Cajamarca in the Cajamarca Region
- Country: Peru
- Region: Cajamarca
- Capital: Cajamarca

Government
  - Mayor: Víctor Andrés Villar Narro

Area
  - Total: 2,979.78 km^{2} (1,150.50 sq mi)
- Elevation: 2,720 m (8,920 ft)

Population
  - Total: 348,433
  - Density: 116.932/km^{2} (302.854/sq mi)
- UBIGEO: 0601
- Website: www.municajamarca.gob.pe

Cajamarca is a province of the Cajamarca Region in Peru. The capital of the province is Cajamarca.

== Geography ==
One of the highest elevations of the province is the Llusk'a Qullpa mountain range at approximately 4,000 m (13,000 ft) on the border of the districts of Encañada and Namora. Other mountains are listed below:

- Allqay Wasi
- Añas Qaqa
- Chawpi Urqu
- Chukuri
- Ch'aki Qucha
- Kampanayuq
- Kinwa
- Kinwa Pampa
- Kinwayuq
- Kiswar
- Kiswarniyuq
- Kuntur Puñuna
- K'uchu Urqu
- Maki Maki
- Puma Pampa
- Qucha Pata
- Qullpa
- Qullpayuq
- Qutu Qaqa
- Ranra
- Rumi Urqu
- Saywayuq
- Suyt'u Rumi
- Usnu
- Wachwa
- Wachwa Pampa
- Waka Qucha
- Waylla Kunka
- Wira Kunka
- Wisk'acha
- Yana Qucha
- Yana T'utura

== Political division ==
The province measures 2,979.78 square kilometres (1,150.50 sq mi) and is divided into twelve districts:

District	Mayor
Asunción	Juan Cornelio Torrel Rabanal
Cajamarca	Víctor Andrés Villar Narro
Chetilla	Israel Mendoza Tomay
Cospán	Luciano Mendez Alcantara
Encañada	Lifoncio Vera Sanchez
Jesús	Marco Antonio Ruiz Ortiz
Llacanora	Roberto Llamoga Ramirez
Los Baños del Inca	Santos Julio Davila Silva
Magdalena	Isaias Tarrillo Terrones
Matará	Ramiro Alejandro Bardales Vigo
Namora	Segundo Quiroz
San Juan	Edinson Armando Teran Medina

== See also ==
- Mamaqucha
- Qillwaqucha
- Quyllur
- Sulluqucha
