= Los Baños del Inca District =

Los Baños del Inca
- District
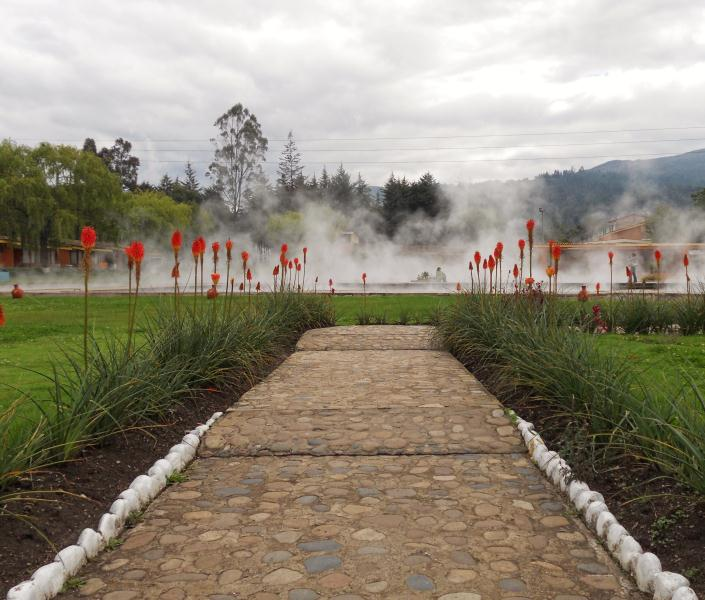
- Thermal springs in the town of Los Baños del Inca

- Flag

- Location within Peru Location within South America
- Coordinates: 7.16284°S 78.4615°W
- Country: Peru
- Region: Cajamarca
- Province: Cajamarca
- Founded: September 7, 1959
- Capital: Los Baños del Inca

Government
  - Mayor: Santos Julio Davila Silva

Area
  - Total: 276.4 km^{2} (106.7 sq mi)
- Elevation: 2,667 m (8,750 ft)

Population (2005 census)
  - Total: 31,764
  - Density: 114.9/km^{2} (297.6/sq mi)
- Time zone: UTC-5 (PET)
- UBIGEO: 060108

Los Baños del Inca District is one of twelve districts of the province Cajamarca in Peru. It is centred on a spa which uses the water from thermal springs

The town is said to have been the favorite resort town of the Lord Inca Atawallpa.

Baños del Inca was known as Pultumarka during the Inca era, in the Spanish Conquest the hot springs resort of Pultumarka was the place where Atawallpa spent time bathing while Francisco Pizarro planned the conquest of the Tawantinsuyu, Pizarro sent some of his representatives to invite the Inca to a dinner. Atawallpa accepted the invitation for the following day. The capture of the Inca king took place in the city of Kashamarka (modern-day Cajamarca).

Pre-Columbian Pultumarka shows occupation since the Cajamarca culture and subsequently of the Inca culture.

Near Cajamarca (Caxamalca), "at a distance of about a league farther, across the valley, might be seen columns of vapor rising up towards the heavens, indicating the place of the famous baths, much frequented by the Peruvian princes."

"Then having arrived at the place where Atahualpa was, he being in a small house which was kept for the Lord, together with other rooms, for his use when he went thither to rest and to bathe, and there was a great tank which they had built, very well made of hewn stone, and to the tank came two pipes of water, one hot and the other cold, and there the one was tempered by the other whenever the Lord or his wives wished to bathe, and no other person dared to enter the water, under penalty of death."
