= Apolonia Dorregaray Veli =

Peruvian artist (1914–2002)

Apolonia Dorregaray
- Born: Modesta Apolonia Dorregaray; 12 January 1914; Cochas Grande, Peru
- Died: 16 September 2002 (aged 88); Lima, Peru
- Occupations: Artist, maker of mate burilado

Modesta Apolonia Dorregaray Veli (12 January 1914 – 16 September 2002) was a traditional Peruvian artist, a skilled maker of mate burilado, the carved gourds of Junín. She was known as the "artista de mates del Valle de Mantaro", a recognition bestowed upon her by the Peruvian writer and anthropologist José María Arguedas. Dorregaray was awarded the Prize of Honour at the Encuentro Inkari held in Callao in 1973, and received the National Grand Master of Peruvian Crafts Prize in 1995.

== Early life and education ==
Modesta Apolonia Dorregaray Veli was born in Cochas Grande, El Tambo District, Huancayo province, in the Department of Junín, Peru on 12 January 1914, the third of seven children of Lorenza Veli and Toribio Dorregaray, a muleteer.

At an early age, Dorregaray learned the traditional technique of mate burilado from her father, who in turn had learned it from his father, Manuel Dorregaray. Her grandfather had learned the 4,000-year-old Peruvian folk art burilado techniques of carving a calabash or gourd fruit by hand with a burin during his regular travels from Cochas to the highlands and the jungle areas of Peru. His mates tropa served as dishes for the soldiers of Andrés Avelino Cáceres Dorregaray. Family tradition held that Cáceres was Manuel Dorregaray's uncle. The young Apolonia Dorregaray accompanied her father on his travels as a muleteer from Cochas to the mountains of Acopalca, Huaytapallana, Yuracyaco and Qullpapata and learned the traditional craft skills of gourd carving during this time.

== Artistic career ==
Dorregaray worked in the "huantina technique", which involved darkening the burilada before carving it. She developed quemado (burning) or piro grabado techniques, using a dried bark of red-hot quinual or eucalyptus that gives different shades of brown and leaves an indelible paint on the surface of the gourd. This would then be carved with a burin, exposing the natural colour below to make the contrast that emphasised the images depicted.

Dorregaray's work included themes that were part of the popular customs of her region. Among these was the feast of Santiago, which is also known as the time for branding cattle, and the Virgin of Cocharcas. There are frequent depictions of folk dances, such as the Chonguinada, the Danza de las Tijeras, and Huaconada. Most of the designs she produced depicted the journeys her family made carrying spices, breads and merchandise to exchange for mates.

In 1964, Dorregaray held an exhibition of her work in the plaza Constitucional in Huancayo, an event attended by the Peruvian writer and anthropologist José María Arguedas, author of Los ríos profundos. He was very taken by Dorregaray's work and helped to disseminate it through the fairs he organised as director of the Casa de la Cultura. This formed the start of Dorregaray's showing her artistic work in exhibitions.

== Artistic legacy ==
In 1944, she gave birth to her only son, Sixto Seguil Dorregaray, whom she trained in the family tradition of mate burilado carving. He could carve before he could read. He in turn taught his children to carve from the age of three, and his daughter Kania carries on the family artistic tradition. Sixto still carves under a large photograph of his late mother.

== Exhibitions ==
- 1966: Exposición y Cursillo de las Obras Artesanales del Valle del Mantaro (Handicrafts of the Mantaro Valley) in the Art Center de Miraflores.
- 1968: Concurso exposición y venta de Artesanía Popular (Competition, exhibition and sale of Popular Crafts) in the Banco Industrial del Perú held in Huancayo.
- 1969: XXXIII Feria Regional del Centro, II Exposición de Arte Popular.
- 1977: Museo Contemporáneo de Arte Popular Peruano (Contemporary Museum of Peruvian Folk Art).
- 1986: VII Exposición de Artesanía, MICTI at Los Descalzos, Rímac.
- 1986: Primera Feria de Turismo at la Feria del Hogar.
- 1987: Galería de Exposiciones del Instituto Nacional de Cultura (National Institute of Culture).
- 1988: Museo Nacional de Antropología y Arqueología (National Museum of Anthropology and Archaeology).
- 1989: Pro-Desarrollo organised by FREDEMO directed by Mario Vargas Llosa.
- In 2014, the Peruvian Ministry of Culture organised a retrospective exhibition of her work entitled Apolonia Dorregaray y el mate burilado tradicional del Perú, obra y legado a 100 años de su nacimiento" celebrating Dorregaray's work and legacy on the centenary of her birth.
