= Mate burilado =

Peruvian carved gourd folk art

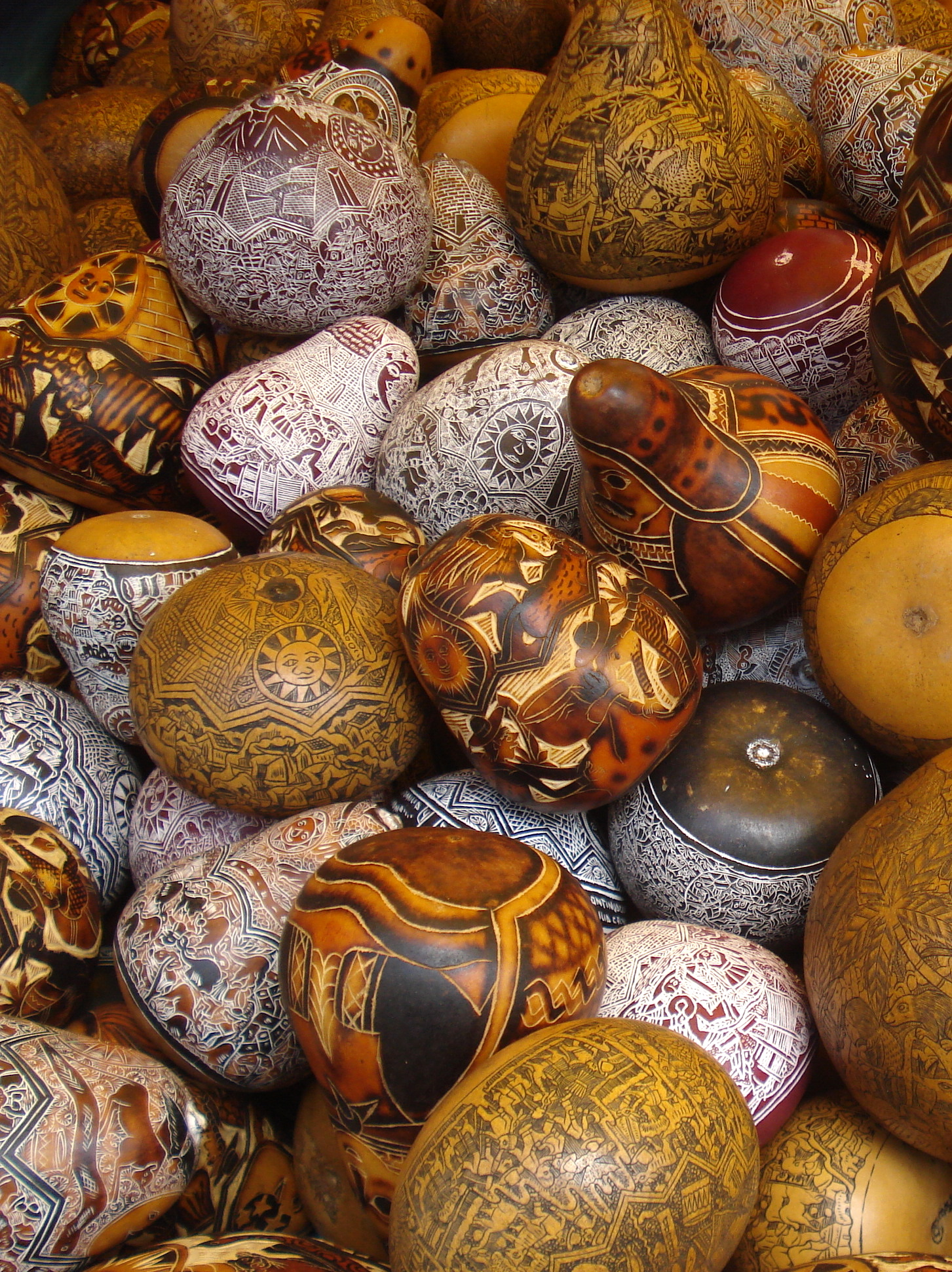
Lagenaria siceraria - mates burilados in Cusco, Peru

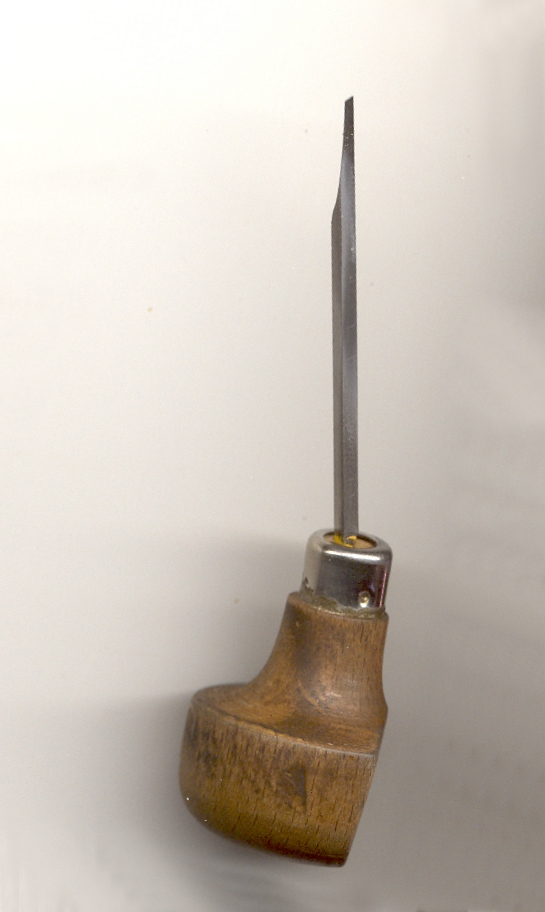
buril

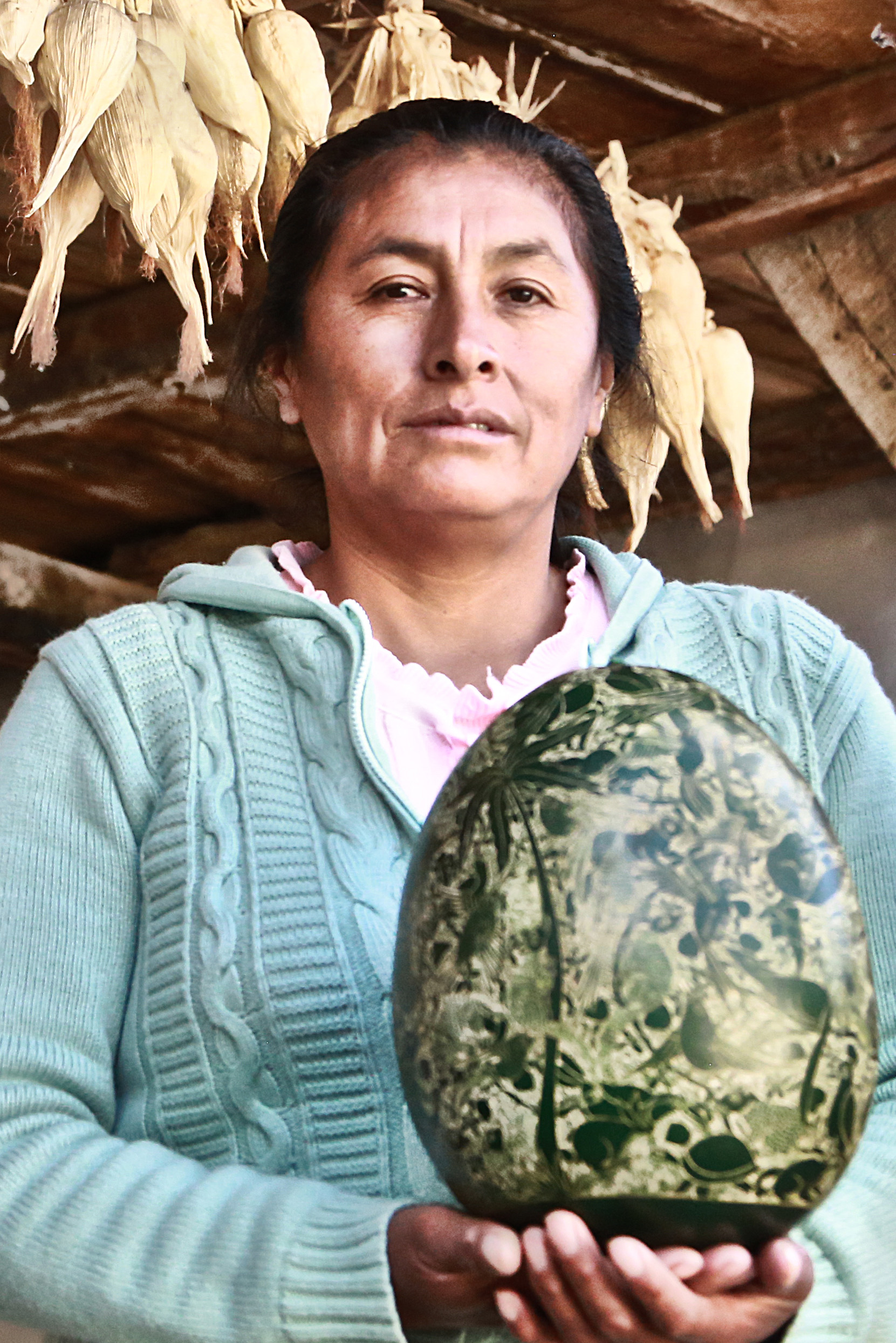
Irma Poma Canchumani

Mate burilado are calabash or gourd fruit decorated by hand with a technique called burilado using the carving instrument called buril or burin. This Peruvian folk art form is found in the Mantaro Valley, as well as in the provinces of Lambayeque and Huanta. For more than 4,000 years, artisans have practiced the tradition of hand-carving dried gourds to document oral narratives. Commonly, the training process takes five years.

== Notable mate burilado artists ==
Mate Burilado artists began to receive individual recognition in the later twentieth century, as the art form became identified as a key element of the Peruvian art world, rather than seen as an indigenous craft practice.

Apolonia Dorregaray Veli (1914 - 2002) was one of the first Peruvian mate burilado artists to be officially recognised as an artist rather than an artisan. She was hailed as the "artista de mates del Valle de Mantaro" by José María Arguedas, who included her work in the fairs he organised as Director of the Casa de la Cultura. Dorregaray learned the craft from her father, Toribio Dorregaray, a muleteer. He in turn had learned the traditional techniques of mate burilado from his father, Manuel Dorregaray who acquired the skills when in the highlands and the jungle areas of Peru and brought them back to his home area of Cochas. The family tradition of carving mate burilado was passed to Apolonia Dorregaray's son Sixto Seguil Dorregaray and to her granddaughter Kania.

In 2017, Pedro Veli Alfaro of Huancayo was recognised as a leading artist in the field. He learnt the art of mate burilado from his parents and set up his own workshop and museum in Cochas Chico, the centre of the art form. He produces carved gourds with traditional motifs of historical and jungle themes. His family continues the traditions of burilado mate making.

Irma Poma Canchumani (born 1969), is Peruvian mate burilado artist and environmental defender.

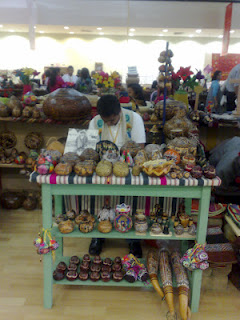
Mate burilado artist Wilfredo Veli
