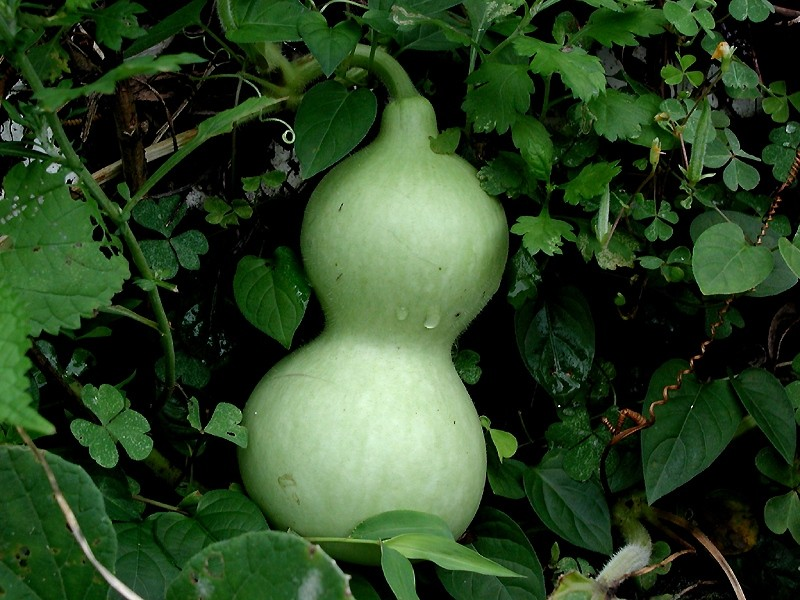
- Green calabash growing on its vine

Scientific classification
- Kingdom: Plantae
- Clade: Tracheophytes
- Clade: Angiosperms
- Clade: Eudicots
- Clade: Rosids
- Order: Cucurbitales
- Family: Cucurbitaceae
- Genus: Lagenaria
- Species: L. siceraria

Binomial name
- Lagenaria siceraria (Molina) Standl.

Synonyms
- List: Cucumis bicirrha J.R.Forst. ex Guill.; Cucumis lagenaria (L.) Dumort.; Cucumis mairei H.Lév.; Cucurbita ciceraria Molina; Cucurbita idololatrica Willd.; Cucurbita lagenaria L.; Cucurbita leucantha Duchesne; Cucurbita longa W.M.Fletcher; Cucurbita pyriformis M.Roem.; Cucurbita siceraria Molina; Cucurbita vittata Blume; Lagenaria bicornuta Chakrav.; Lagenaria cochinchinensis M.Roem.; Lagenaria hispida Ser.; Lagenaria idolatrica (Willd.) Ser.; Lagenaria lagenaria (L.) Cockerell; Lagenaria leucantha Rusby; Lagenaria microcarpa Naudin; Lagenaria siceraria f. depressa (Ser.) M.Hiroe; Lagenaria siceraria var. laevisperma Millán; Lagenaria siceraria f. microcarpa (Naudin) M.Hiroe; Lagenaria vittata Ser.; Lagenaria vulgaris Ser.; Lagenaria vulgaris var. clavata Ser.; Lagenaria vulgaris var. gourda Ser.; Pepo lagenarius Moench; Trochomeria rehmannii Cogn.

= Calabash =

Species of bottle gourd plant

Calabash (/ˈkæləbæʃ/; Lagenaria siceraria) is a vine in the family Cucurbitaceae which is grown for its fruit. It is native to tropical Africa, and cultivated across the tropics. It can be either harvested young to be consumed as a vegetable, or harvested mature to be dried and used as a kitchen utensil (typically as a ladle or bowl), beverage container or a musical instrument. When it is fresh, the fruit has a light green smooth skin and white flesh. It is also known as bottle gourd, white-flowered gourd, long melon, birdhouse gourd, New Guinea bean, New Guinea butter bean or Tasmania bean.

Calabash fruits have a variety of shapes: they can be huge and rounded, small and bottle-shaped, or slim and serpentine, and they can grow to be over a metre long. Rounder varieties are typically called calabash gourds (L. siceraria var. depressa). Calabash gourds can grow to great size. One grown in Taylorsvlle, Kentucky in 2001 weighed 111.5 kg (246 lb). The gourd was one of the world's first cultivated plants grown not primarily for food, but for use as containers. The bottle gourd may have been carried from Asia to Africa, Europe, and the Americas in the course of human migration, or by seeds floating across the oceans inside the gourd. It has been proven to have been globally domesticated (and existed in the New World) during the Pre-Columbian era.

There is sometimes confusion when discussing "calabash" because the name is shared with the unrelated calabash tree (Crescentia cujete), whose hard, hollow fruits are also used to make utensils, containers, and musical instruments.

== Etymology ==
The English word calabash is loaned from Middle French: calebasse, which in turn derived from Spanish: calabaza meaning gourd or pumpkin. The Spanish word is of pre-Roman origin. It comes from the Iberian: calapaccu, from -cal which means house or shell. It is a doublet of carapace and galapago. The English word is cognate with Catalan: carabassa ("pumpkin; orange colour"), Galician: cabaza ("gourd, pumpkin, squash; calabash (container)"), Occitan: calebasso, carabasso, carbasso, Portuguese: cabaça ("gourd; calabash (container)") and Sicilian: caravazza (and caramazza).

== History ==
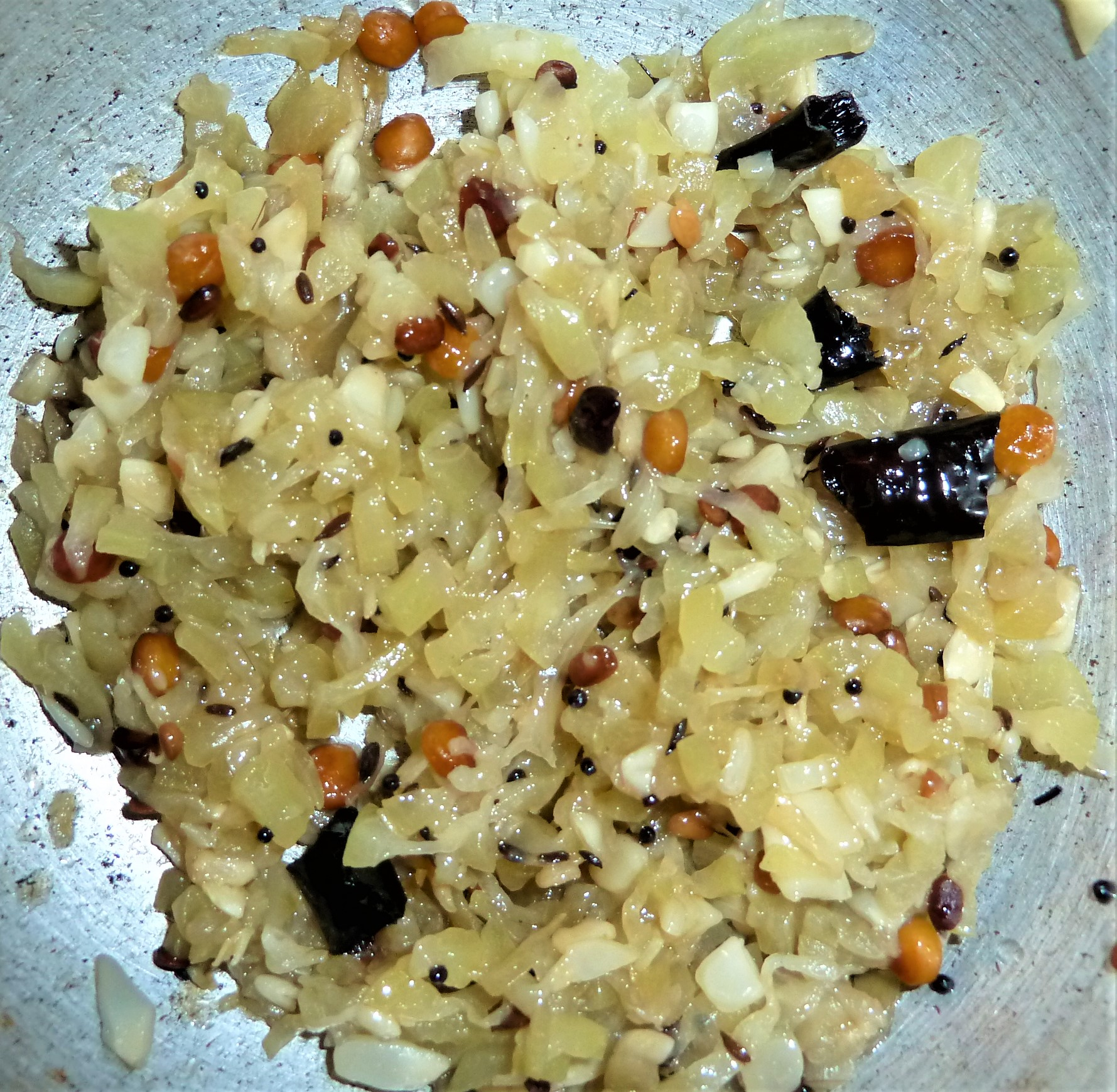
Bottle gourd curry

The bottle gourd has been recovered from archaeological contexts in China and Japan dating to c. 8,000–9,000 BP, whereas in Africa, despite decades of high-quality archaeobotanical research, the earliest record of its occurrence remains the 1884 report of a bottle gourd being recovered from a 12th Dynasty tomb at Thebes dating to ca. 4,000 BP. When considered together, the genetic and archaeological information points toward L. siceraria being independently brought under domestication first in Asia, and more than 4,000 years later, in Africa. The bottle gourd is a commonly cultivated plant in tropical and subtropical areas of the world, and was eventually domesticated in southern Africa. Stands of L. siceraria, which may be source plants and not merely domesticated stands, were reported in Zimbabwe in 2004. This apparent wild plant produces thinner-walled fruit that, when dried, would not endure the rigors of use on long journeys as a water container. Today's gourd may owe its tough, waterproof wall to selection pressures over its long history of domestication.

Gourds were cultivated in Africa, Asia, Europe, and the Americas for thousands of years before Columbus' arrival to the Americas. Polynesian specimens of calabash were found to have genetic markers suggesting hybridization from Asian and American cultivars. In Europe, Walahfrid Strabo (808–849), abbot and poet from Reichenau and advisor to the Carolingian kings, discussed the gourd in his Hortulus as one of the 23 plants of an ideal garden.

The mystery of the bottle gourd – namely that this African or Eurasian species was being grown in the Americas over 8,000 years ago – comes from the difficulty in understanding how it arrived in the Americas. The bottle gourd was theorized to have drifted across the Atlantic Ocean from Africa to South America, but in 2005 a group of researchers suggested that it may have been domesticated earlier than food crops and livestock and, like dogs, was brought into the New World at the end of the ice age by the native hunter-gatherer Paleo-Indians, which they based on a study of the genetics of archaeological samples. This study purportedly showed that gourds in American archaeological finds were more closely related to Asian variants than to African ones.

In 2014 this theory was repudiated based on a more thorough genetic study. Researchers more completely examined the plastid genomes of a broad sample of bottle gourds, and concluded that North and South American specimens were most closely related to wild African variants and could have drifted over the ocean several or many times, as long as 10,000 years ago.

== Cultivation ==
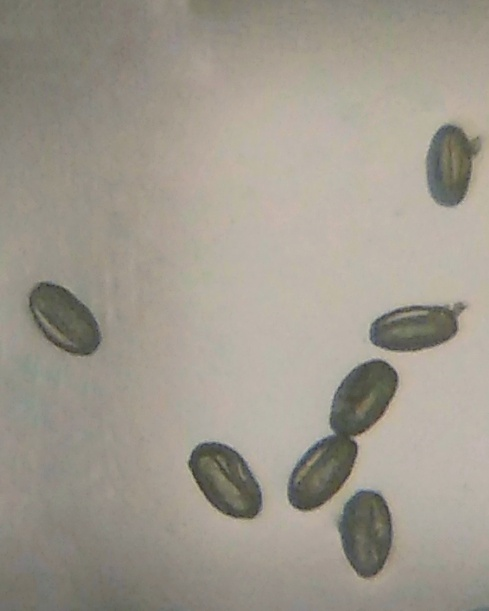
Pollen of Lagenaria siceraria (Size: ~60 microns)

Bottle gourds are grown by direct sowing of seeds or transplanting 15- to 20-day-old seedlings. The plant prefers well-drained, moist, organic rich soil. It requires plenty of moisture in the growing season and a warm, sunny position, sheltered from the wind. It can be cultivated in small places such as in a pot, and allowed to spread on a trellis or roof. In rural areas, many houses with thatched roofs are covered with the gourd vines. Bottle gourds grow very rapidly and their stems can reach a length of 9 m in the summer, so they need a solid support along the stem if they are to climb a pole or trellis. If planted under a tall tree, the vine may grow up to the top of the tree. To obtain more fruit, farmers sometimes cut off the tip of the vine when it has grown to 2 metres in length. This forces the plant to produce side branches that will bear flowers and yield more fruit.

The plant produces night blooming white flowers. The male flowers have long peduncles and the females have short ones with an ovary in the shape of the fruit. Sometimes the female flowers drop off without growing into a gourd due to the failure of pollination if there is no night pollinator (probably a kind of moth) in the garden. Hand pollination can be used to solve the problem. Pollens are around 60 microns in length.

First crop is ready for harvest within two months; first flowers open in about 45 days from sowing. Each plant can yield 1 fruit per day for the next 45 days if enough nutrients are available.

Yield ranges from 35 to 40 tons/ha, per season of 3 months cycle.

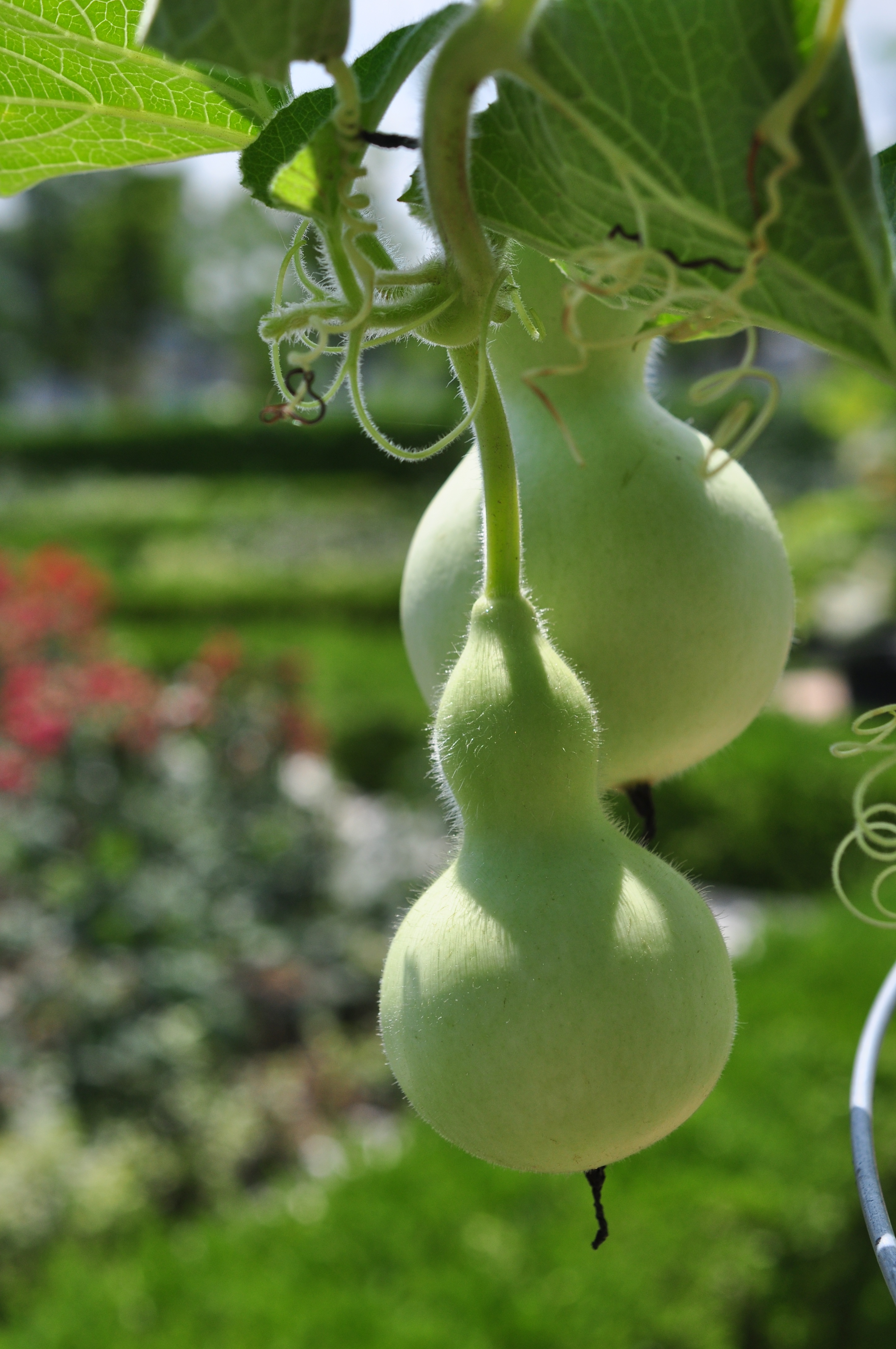
Pear-shaped bottle gourd in Seoul, Korea

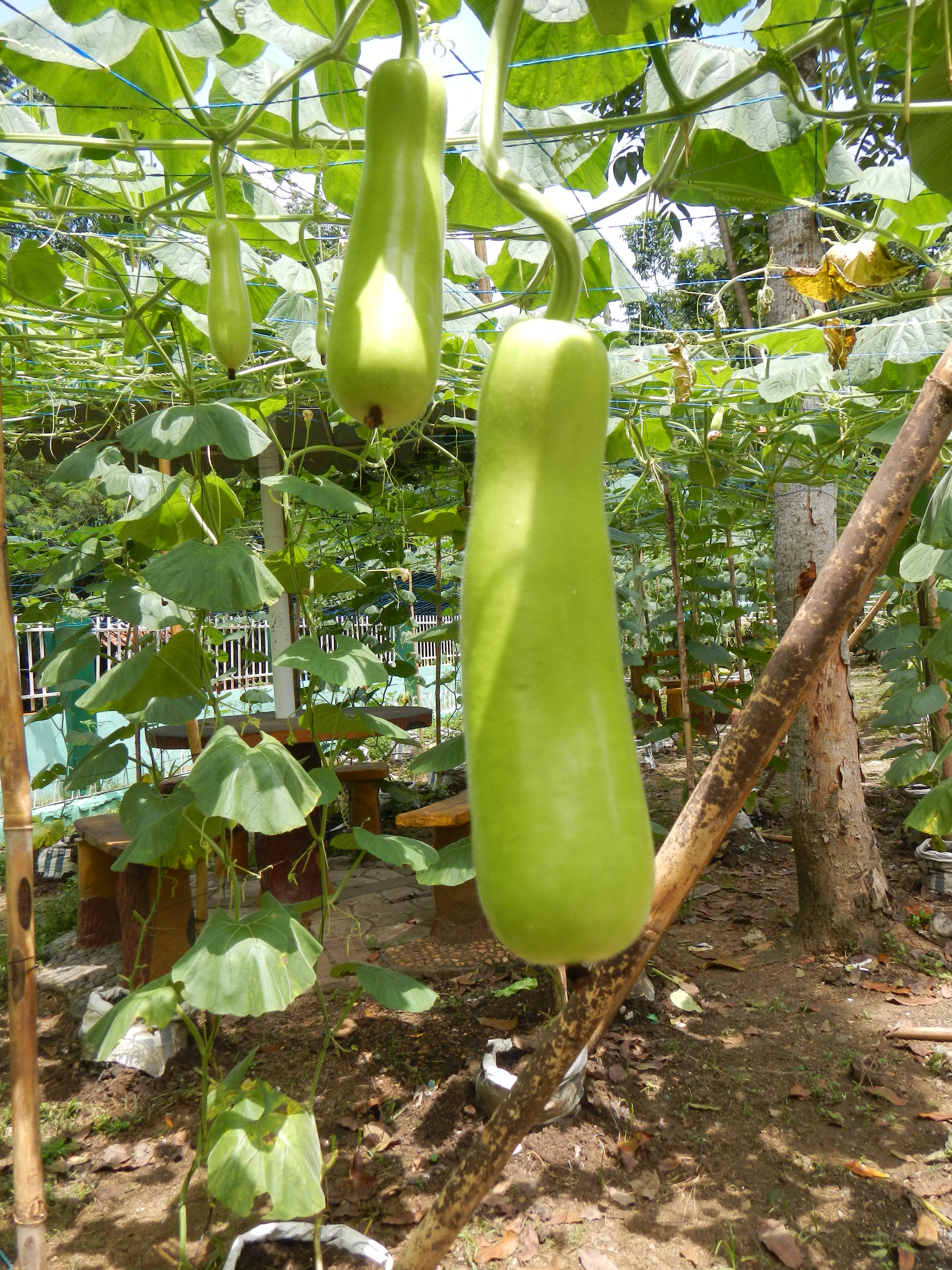
Slim, elongated upo squash, in San Rafael, Bulacan, Philippines

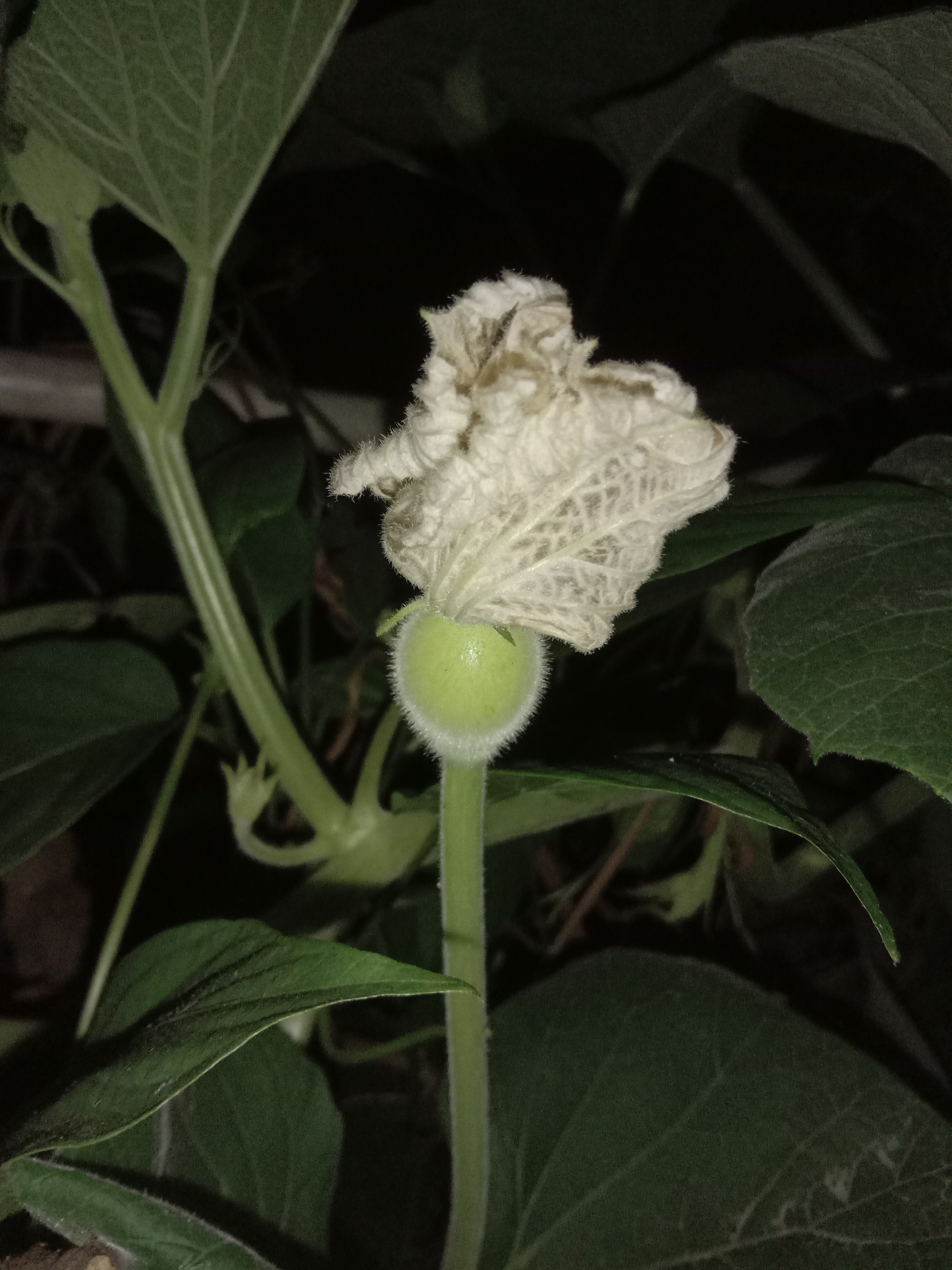
A female Calabash flower with a visible ovary at night, in West Bengal, India.

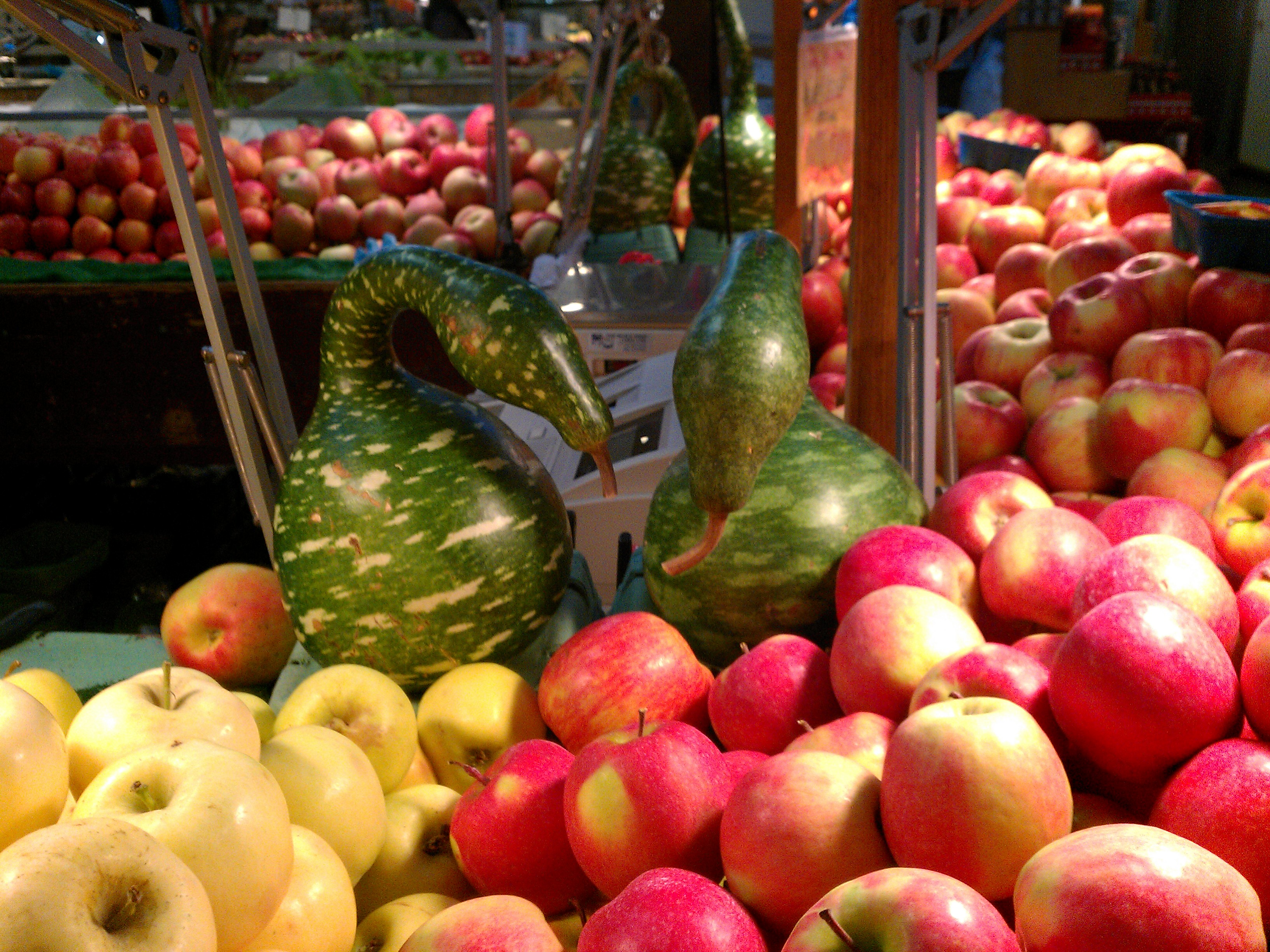
Crook-necked "geese" cultivar in Granville Island Public Market, Canada

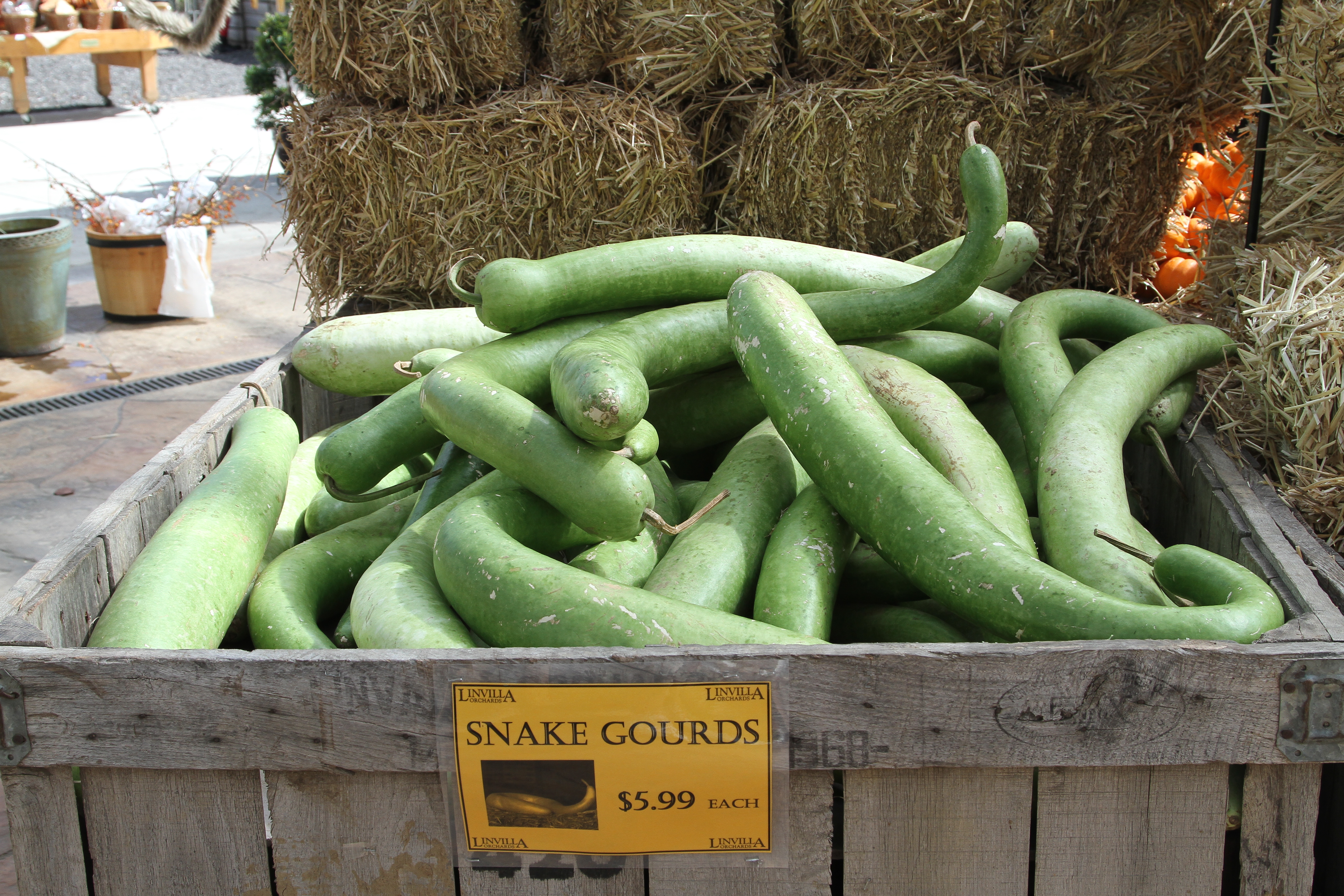
Serpentine snake gourds in Media, Pennsylvania, United States

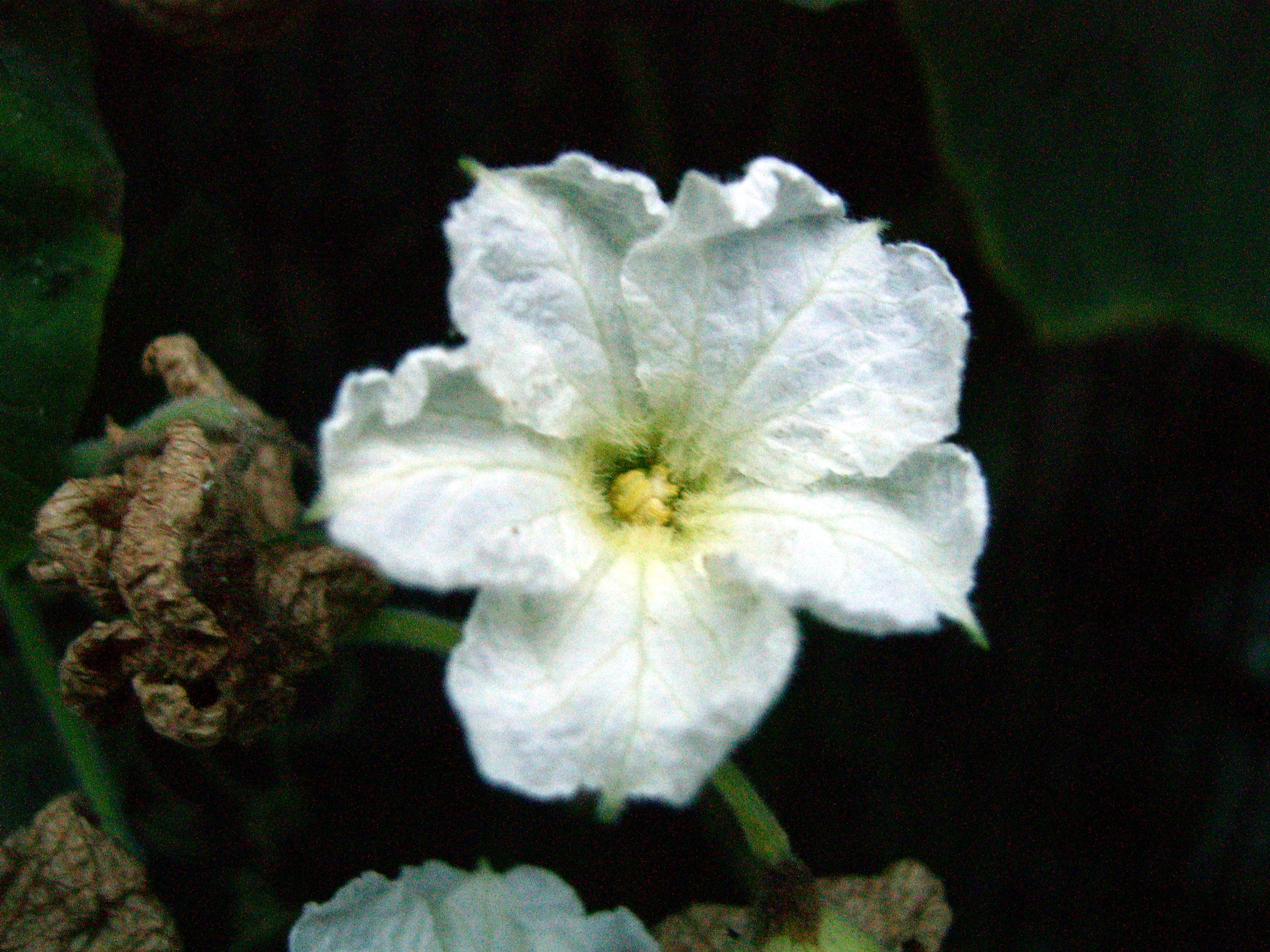
Calabash flower

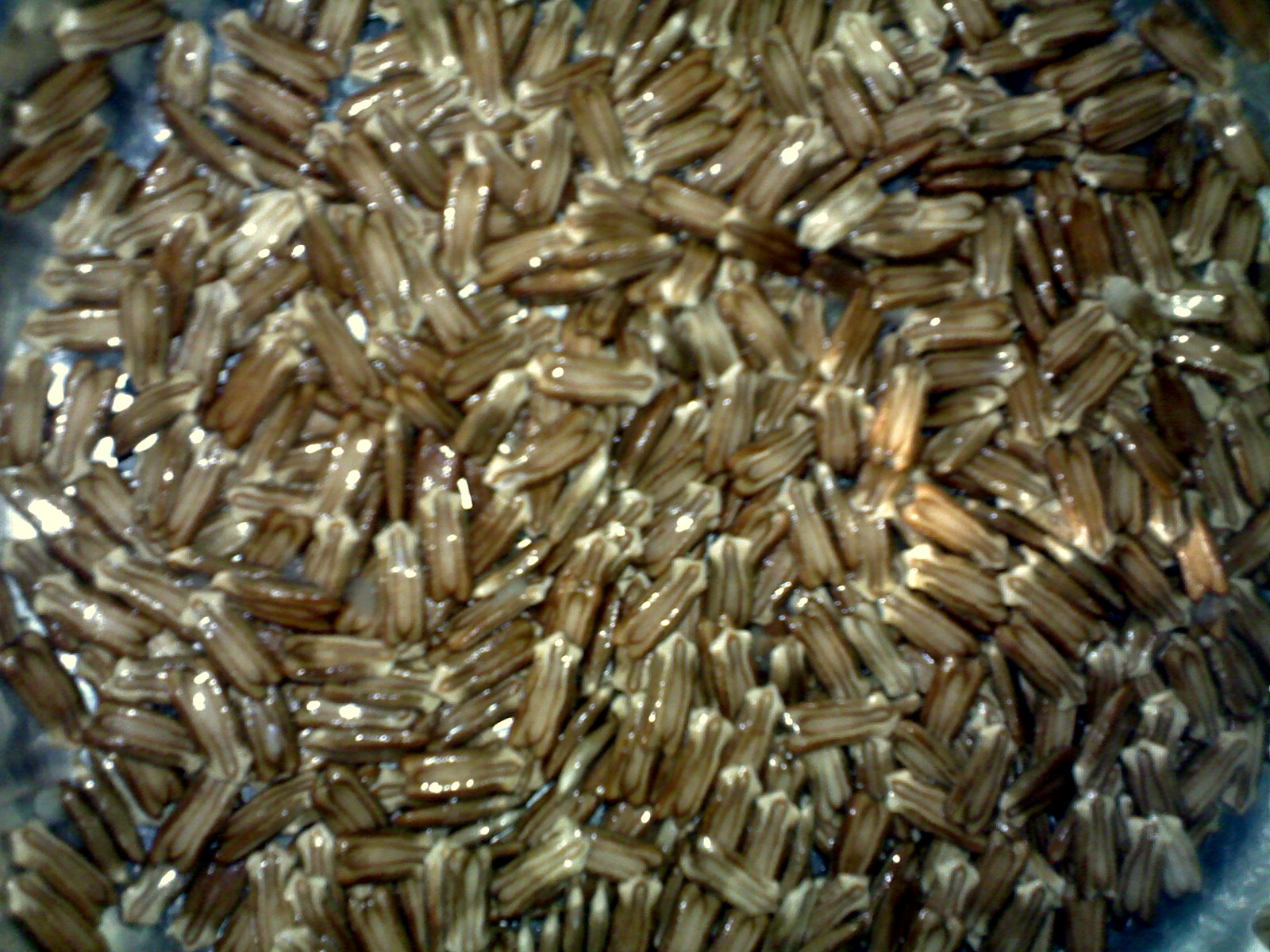
Calabash seeds

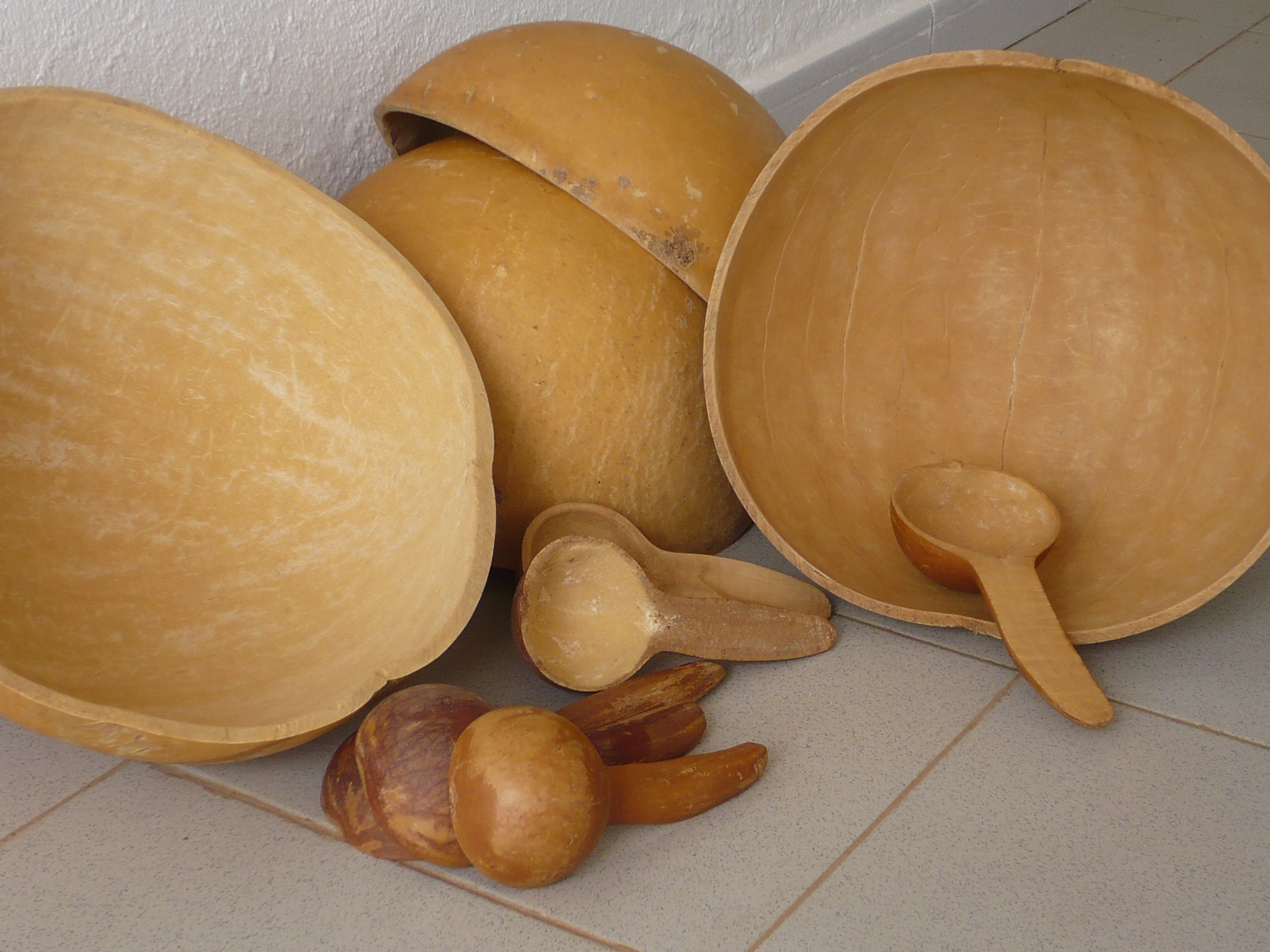
Collection of bowls and spoons made of bottle gourd from Mali, 2007

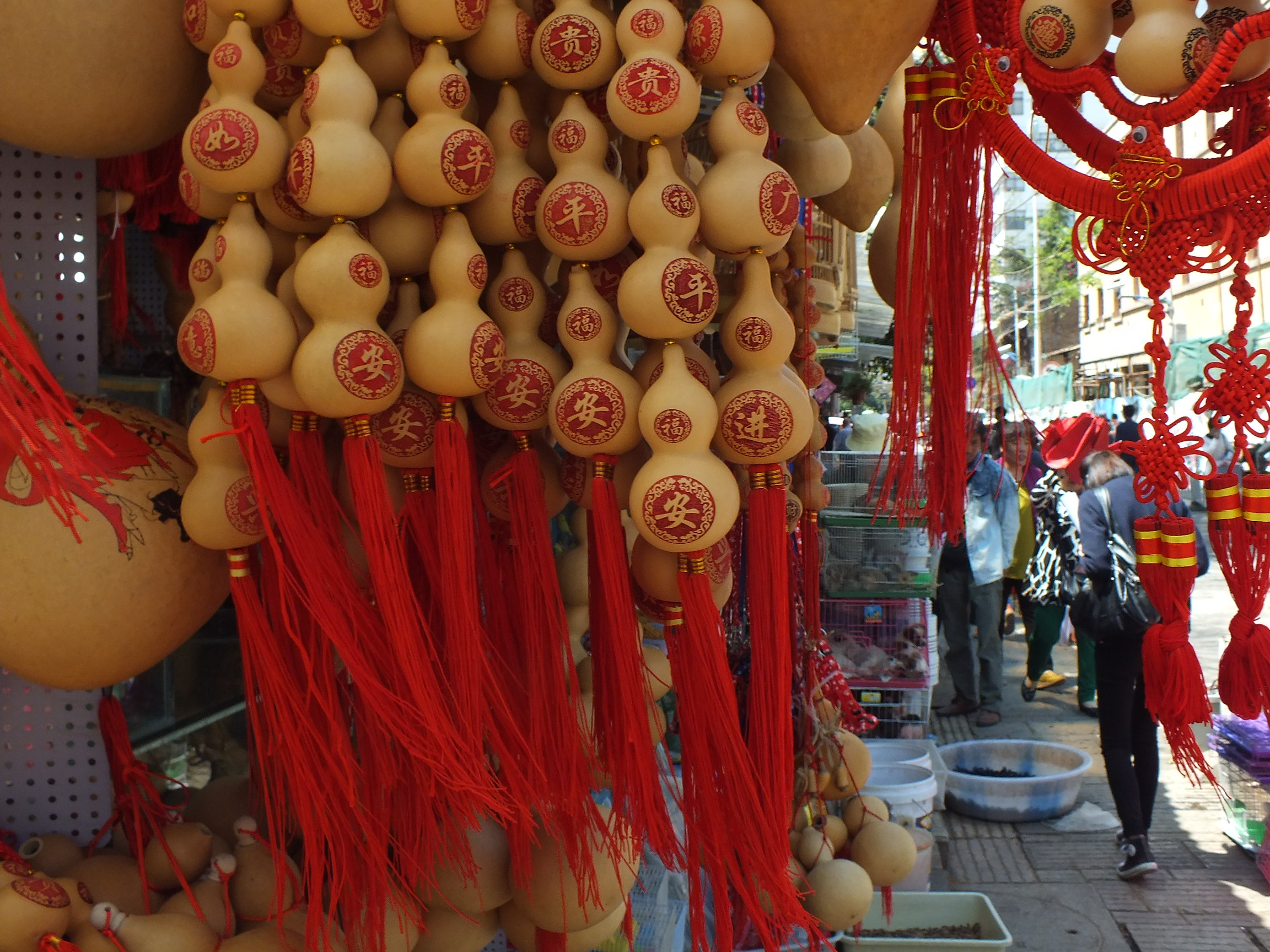
Wuhua District, Kunming, Yunnan, China

== Toxicity ==
Like other members of the family Cucurbitaceae, gourds contain cucurbitacins that are known to be cytotoxic at a high concentration. The tetracyclic triterpenoid cucurbitacins present in fruits and vegetables of the cucumber family are responsible for the bitter taste, and could cause stomach ulcers. In extreme cases, people have died from drinking the juice of gourds. The toxic cases are usually due to the gourd being used to make juice, which the drinkers described as being unusually bitter. In three of the lethal cases, the victims were diabetics in their 50s and 60s. In 2018, a healthy woman in her 40s was hospitalized for severe reactions after consuming the juice and died three days later from complications.

The plant is not normally toxic when eaten. The excessively bitter (and toxic) gourds are due to improper storage (temperature swings or high temperature) and over-ripening.

== Nutrition ==
Boiled calabash is 95% water, 4% carbohydrates, 1% protein, and contains negligible fat (table). In a reference amount of 100 grams (3.5 oz), cooked calabash supplies a moderate amount of vitamin C (10% of the Daily Value), with no other micronutrients in significant amounts (table).

Calabash, cooked, no salt
Nutritional value per 100 g (3.5 oz)
- Energy: 63 kJ (15 kcal)
- Carbohydrates: 3.69 g
- Dietary fiber: 1.2 g
- Fat: 0.02 g
- Protein: 0.6 g
Vitamins and minerals
Vitamins	Quantity %DV^{†}
Thiamine (B1)	2% 0.029 mg
Riboflavin (B2)	2% 0.022 mg
Niacin (B3)	2% 0.39 mg
Pantothenic acid (B5)	3% 0.144 mg
Vitamin B6	2% 0.038 mg
Folate (B9)	1% 4 μg
Vitamin C	9% 8.5 mg
Minerals	Quantity %DV^{†}
Calcium	2% 24 mg
Iron	1% 0.25 mg
Magnesium	3% 11 mg
Manganese	3% 0.066 mg
Phosphorus	1% 13 mg
Potassium	6% 170 mg
Sodium	0% 2 mg
Zinc	6% 0.7 mg
- Other constituents: Quantity
- Water: 95 g
- Link to USDA Database entry
- ^{†}Percentages estimated using US recommendations for adults, except for potassium, which is estimated based on expert recommendation from the National Academies.

== Culinary uses ==
=== Central America ===
In Central America the seeds of the bottle gourd are toasted and ground with other ingredients (including rice, cinnamon, and allspice) to make one type of the drink horchata.

=== East Asia ===
==== China ====
The calabash is frequently used in southern Chinese cuisine in either a stir-fry dish or a soup.

==== Japan ====
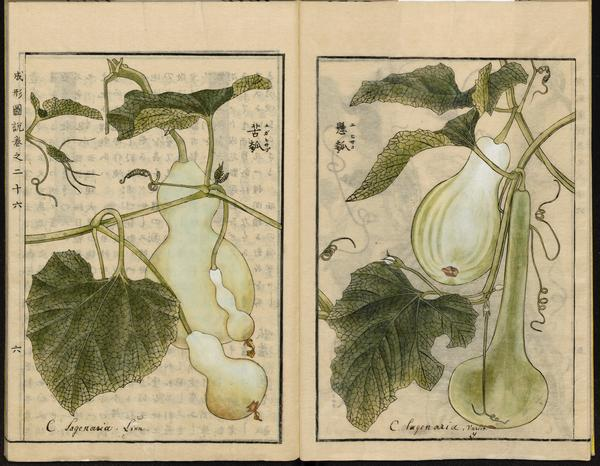
Calabash varieties, illustration from the Japanese agricultural encyclopedia Seikei Zusetsu (1804)

In Japan, it is commonly sold in the form of dried, marinated strips known as kanpyō and is used as an ingredient for making makizushi (rolled sushi).

==== Korea ====
Traditionally in Korea, the inner flesh has been eaten as namul vegetable and the outside cut in half to make bowls. Both fresh and dried flesh of bak is used in Korean cuisine. Fresh calabash flesh, scraped out, seeded, salted and squeezed to draw out moisture, is called baksok. Scraped and sun-dried calabash flesh, called bak-goji, is usually soaked before being stir-fried. Soaked bak-goji is often simmered in sauce or stir-fried before being added to japchae and gimbap. Sometimes uncooked raw baksok is seasoned to make saengchae.

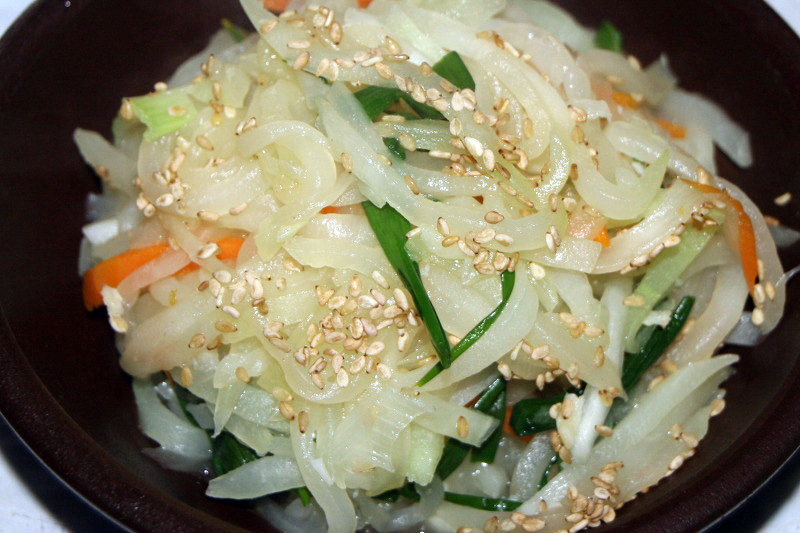
Bak-namul (seasoned calabash side dish)

=== Southeast Asia ===
==== Burma ====
In Burma, it is a popular fruit. The young leaves are also boiled and eaten with a spicy, fermented fish sauce. It can also be cut up, coated in batter and deep fried to make fritters, which are eaten with Burmese mohinga.

==== Philippines ====
In the Philippines, calabash (known locally as upo) is commonly cooked in soup dishes like tinola. They are also common ingredients in noodle (pancit) dishes.

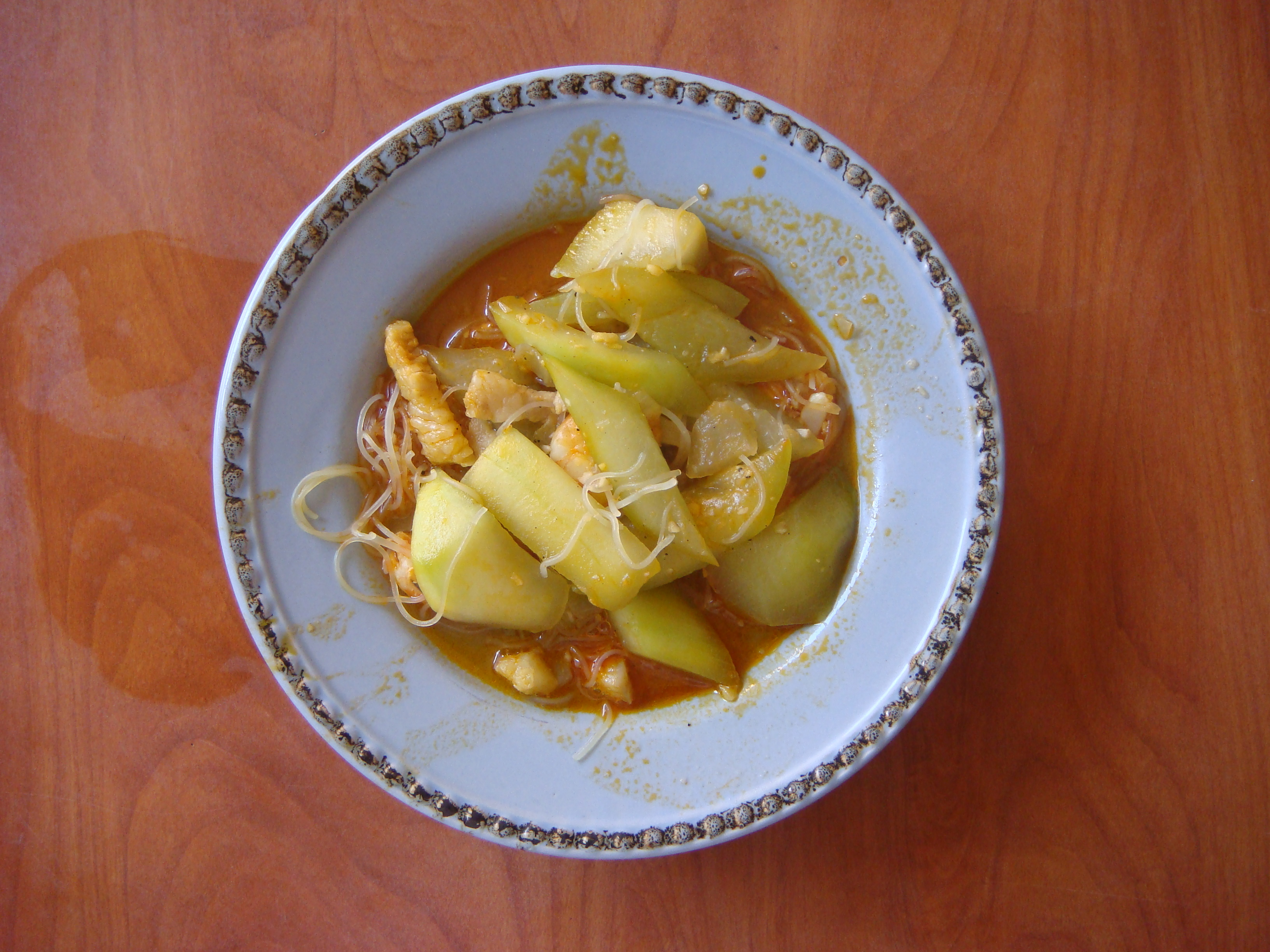
Upo with sotanghon

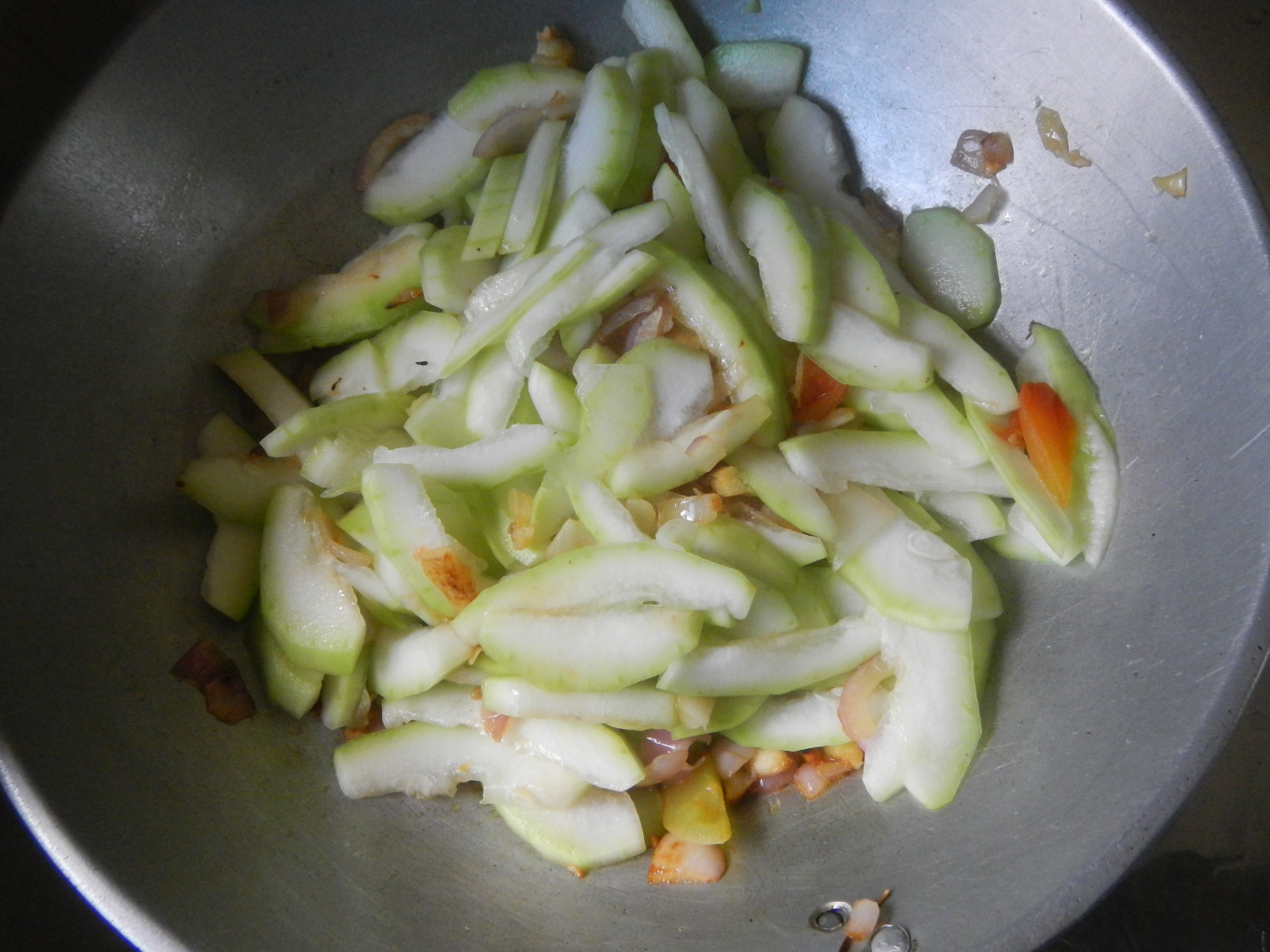
Upo being sauteed (ginisa)

==== Vietnam ====
In Vietnam, it is a very popular vegetable, commonly cooked in soup with shrimp, meatballs, clams, various fish like freshwater catfish or snakehead fish or crab. It is also commonly stir-fried with meat or seafood, or incorporated as an ingredient of a hotpot. It is also used as a medicine. Americans have called calabashes from Vietnam "opo squash".

The shoots, tendrils, and leaves of the plant may also be eaten as greens.

=== South Asia ===
==== Bangladesh ====
In Bangladesh the fruit is served with rice as a common dish. It is called ‘Kodu’ or ‘Lau’ in this country.

==== India ====
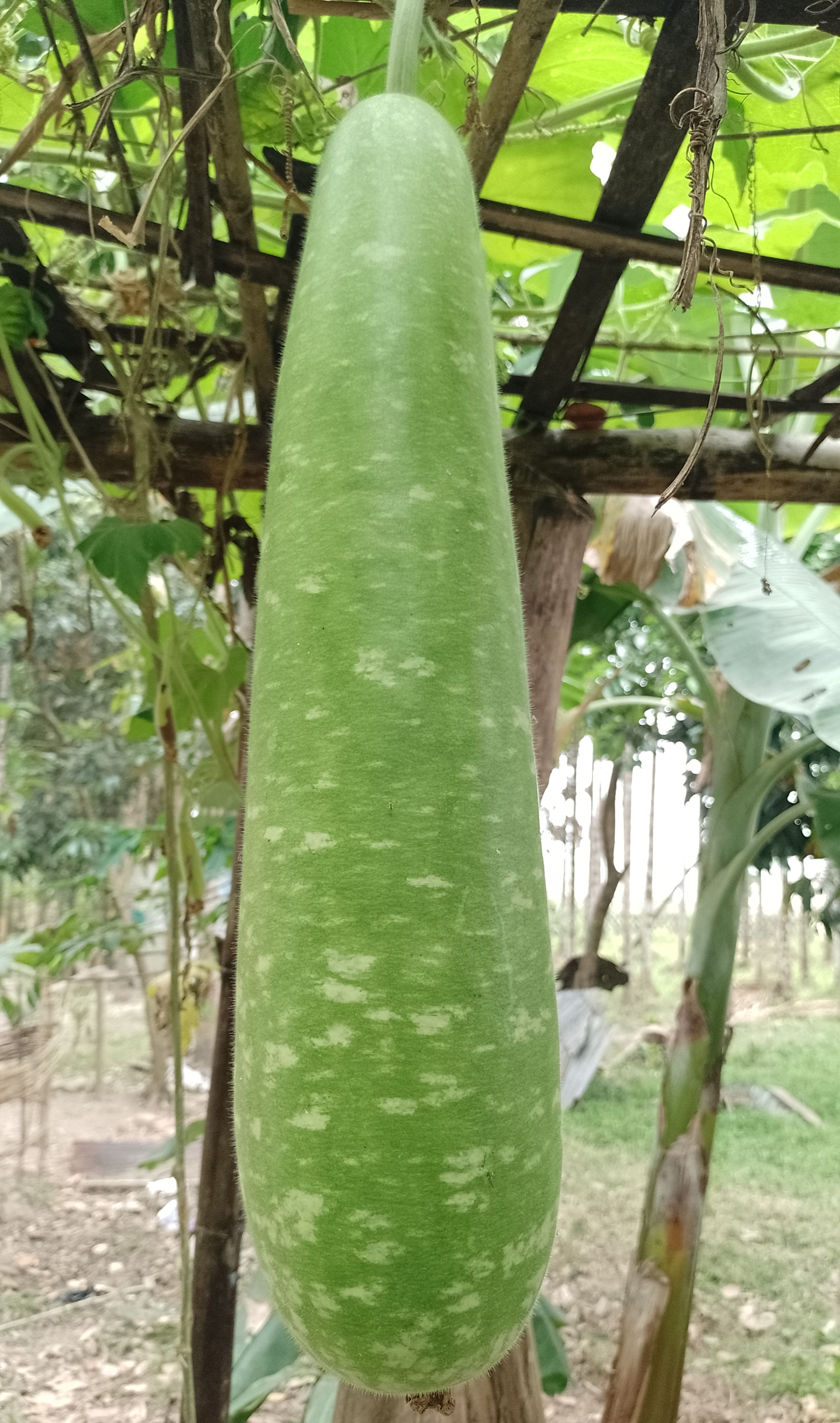
An Indian calabash

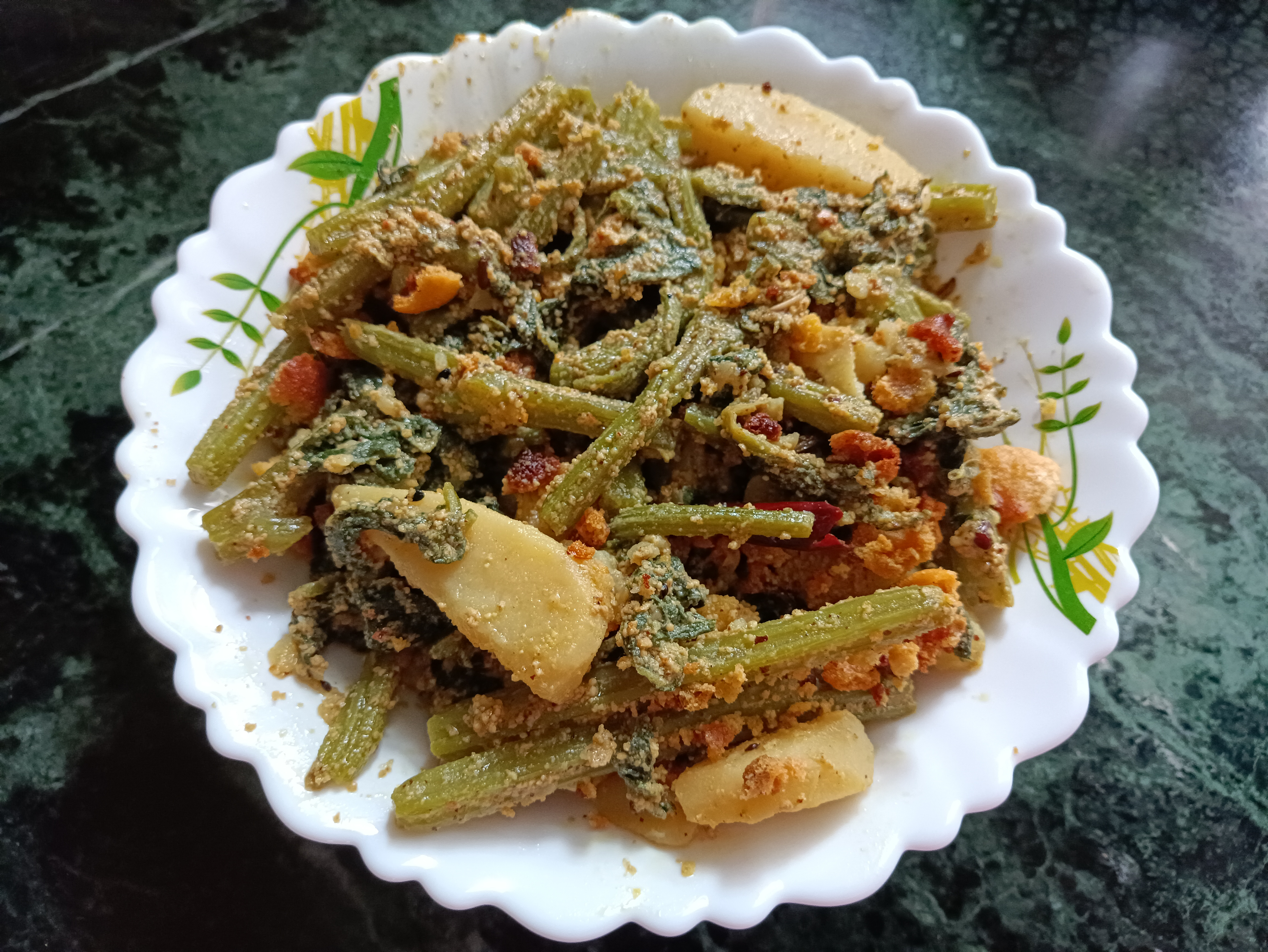
Bengali dish made with the stems and leaves of a bottle gourd plant

A popular north Indian dish is lauki chana, (chana dal and diced gourd in a semi-dry gravy). In the state of Maharashtra in India, a similar preparation called dudhi chana is popular. The skin of the vegetable is used in making a dry spicy chutney preparation. It is consumed in Assam with fish curry, as boiled vegetable curry and also fried with potato and tomatoes. In Andhra Pradesh it is called sorakaya and is used to make sorakaya pulusu (with tamarind juice), sorakaya palakura (curry with milk and spices) and sorakaya pappu (with lentils). Lau chingri, a dish prepared with bottle gourd and prawn, is popular in West Bengal. The edible leaves and young stems of the plant are widely used in Bengali cuisine. Although popularly called lauki in Hindi in northern part of the country, it is also called kaddu in certain parts of country like eastern India. (However, "kaddu" popularly translates to "pumpkin" in northern India.) It can be consumed as a dish with rice or roti for its medicinal benefits. In Gujarat, a traditional Gujarati savoury cake called handvo is made primarily using bottle gourd (in Gujarati, dudhi), sesame seeds, flour, and often lentils. Lauki kheer (grated bottle gourd, sugar and milk preparation) is a dessert from Telangana, usually prepared for festive occasions. In Karnataka, bottle gourd is called Sorekayi and is used to prepare palya (stir-fry) and Sambaru (a south Indian stew). Also, crispy sorekayi dosé (dosa) is one of the popular breakfasts in Karnataka.

==== Nepal ====
In Nepal, in the Madheshi southern plains, preparations other than as a normal vegetable include halva and khichdi.

==== Pakistan ====
In Pakistan, the calabash is cultivated on a large scale as its fruit are a popular vegetable.

==== Sri Lanka ====
In Sri Lanka, it is used in combination with rice to make a variety of milk rice, which is a popular dish in Sri Lanka. Different types of curries are also made using this, especially white curries with coconut milk.

=== Europe ===
==== Italy ====
In Southern Italy and Sicily, the variety Lagenaria siceraria var. longissima, called zucca da vino, zucca bottiglia, or cucuzza, is grown and used in soup or along with pasta.

In Sicily, mostly in the Palermo area, a traditional soup called "Minestra di Tenerumi" is made with the tender leaves of L. siceraria var. longissima along with peeled tomato and garlic. The young leaves are themselves called "tenerumi", and Lagenaria in Sicily is cultivated both professionally and in home orchards mostly to use the leaves as a vegetable, the fruit being treated almost as a secondary product.

It is also grown by the Italian diaspora.

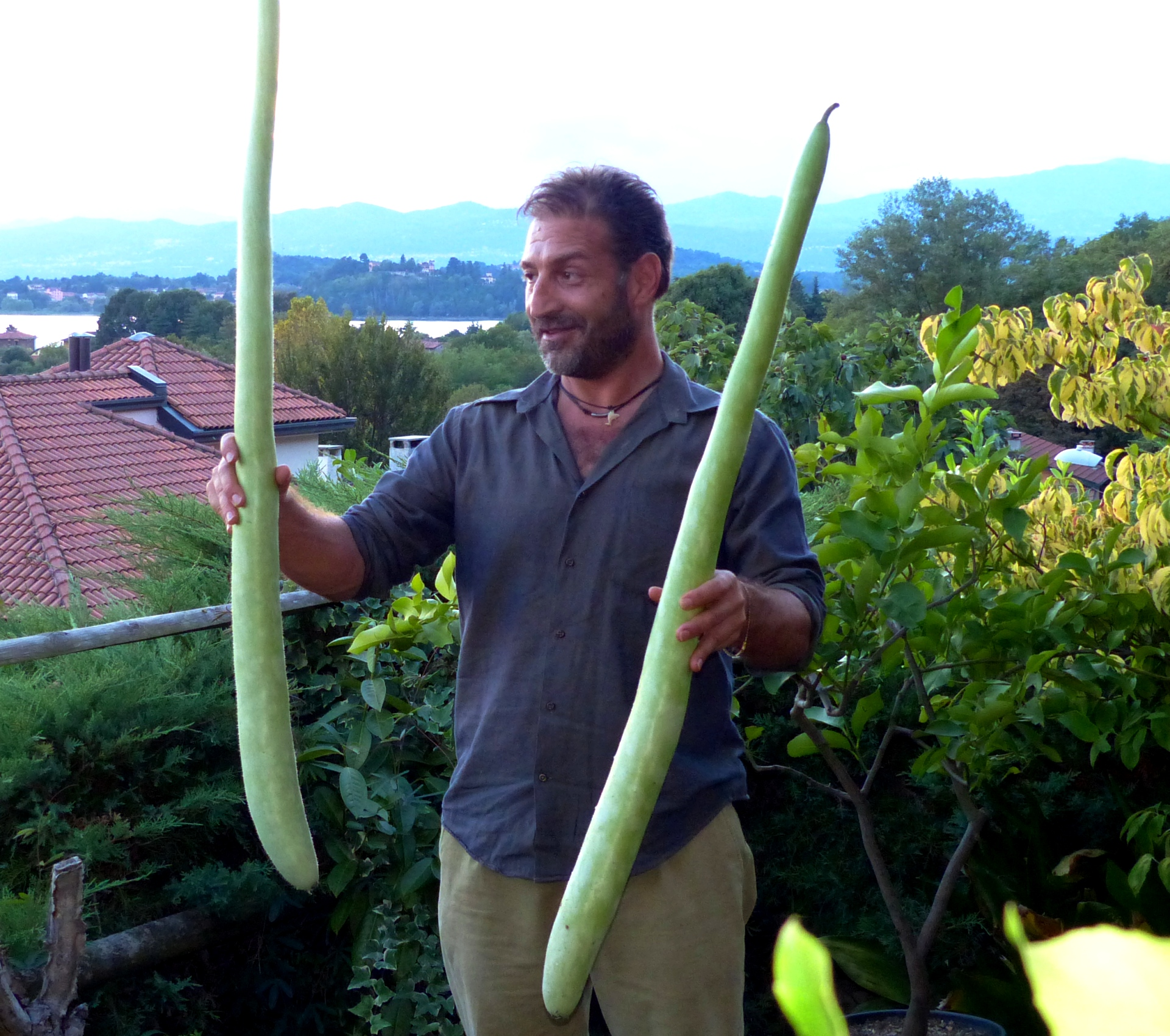
Man with cucuzza

== Cultural uses ==
=== Africa ===
Hollowed-out and dried calabashes are a very typical utensil in households across West Africa. They are used to clean rice, carry water, and as food containers. Smaller sizes are used as bowls to drink palm wine. Calabashes are used in making the West African instruments like the Ṣẹ̀kẹ̀rẹ̀, a Yoruba instrument similar to a maraca, kora (a harp-lute), xalam/ngoni (a lute), the goje (a traditional fiddle), and the sacred Gamba of the Serer ethnoreligious group of the Senegambia – which is beaten in the event of the death of a Serer elder, followed by the usual funeral regalia to send them to the next life. They also serve as resonators underneath the balafon (West African marimba). The calabash is also used in making the shegureh (a Sierra Leonean women's rattle) and balangi (a Sierra Leonean type of balafon) musical instruments. Sometimes large calabashes are simply hollowed, dried and used as percussion instruments by striking them, especially by Fulani, Songhai, Gur-speaking and Hausa peoples. In Nigeria the calabash has been used by some motorcyclists as an imitation helmet in an attempt to circumvent motorcycle helmet laws. In South Africa it is commonly used as a drinking vessel and a vessel for carrying food by communities, such as the Bapedi and AmaZulu. Erbore children of Ethiopia wear hats made from the calabash to protect them from the sun. South Africa's FNB Stadium, which hosted the 2010 FIFA World Cup, is known as The Calabash as its shape takes inspiration from the calabash. The calabash is also used in the manufacture of puppets.

Calabash also has a large cultural significance. In many African legends, Calabash (commonly referred to as gourds) is presented as a vessel for knowledge and wisdom.

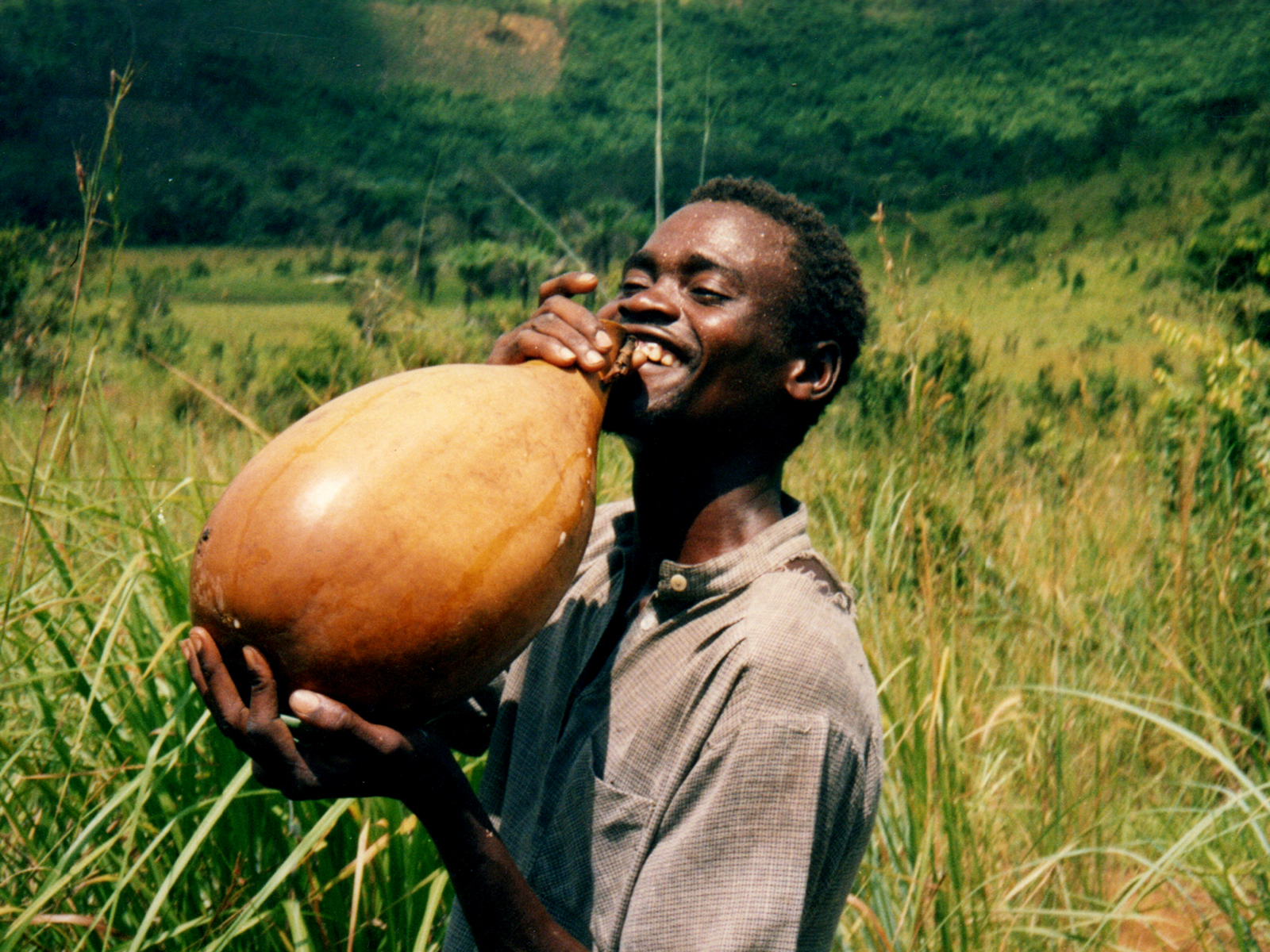
Calabashes (nkalu in Kikongo) are used to collect and store palm wine in Bandundu Province, Democratic Republic of the Congo (c. 1990)

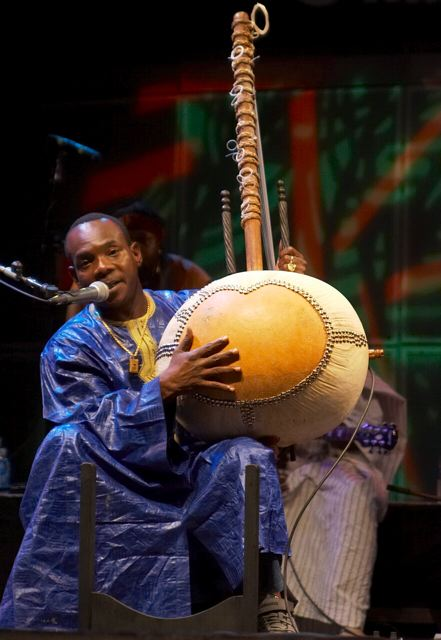
The Malian kora player Toumani Diabaté with his instrument (2007)

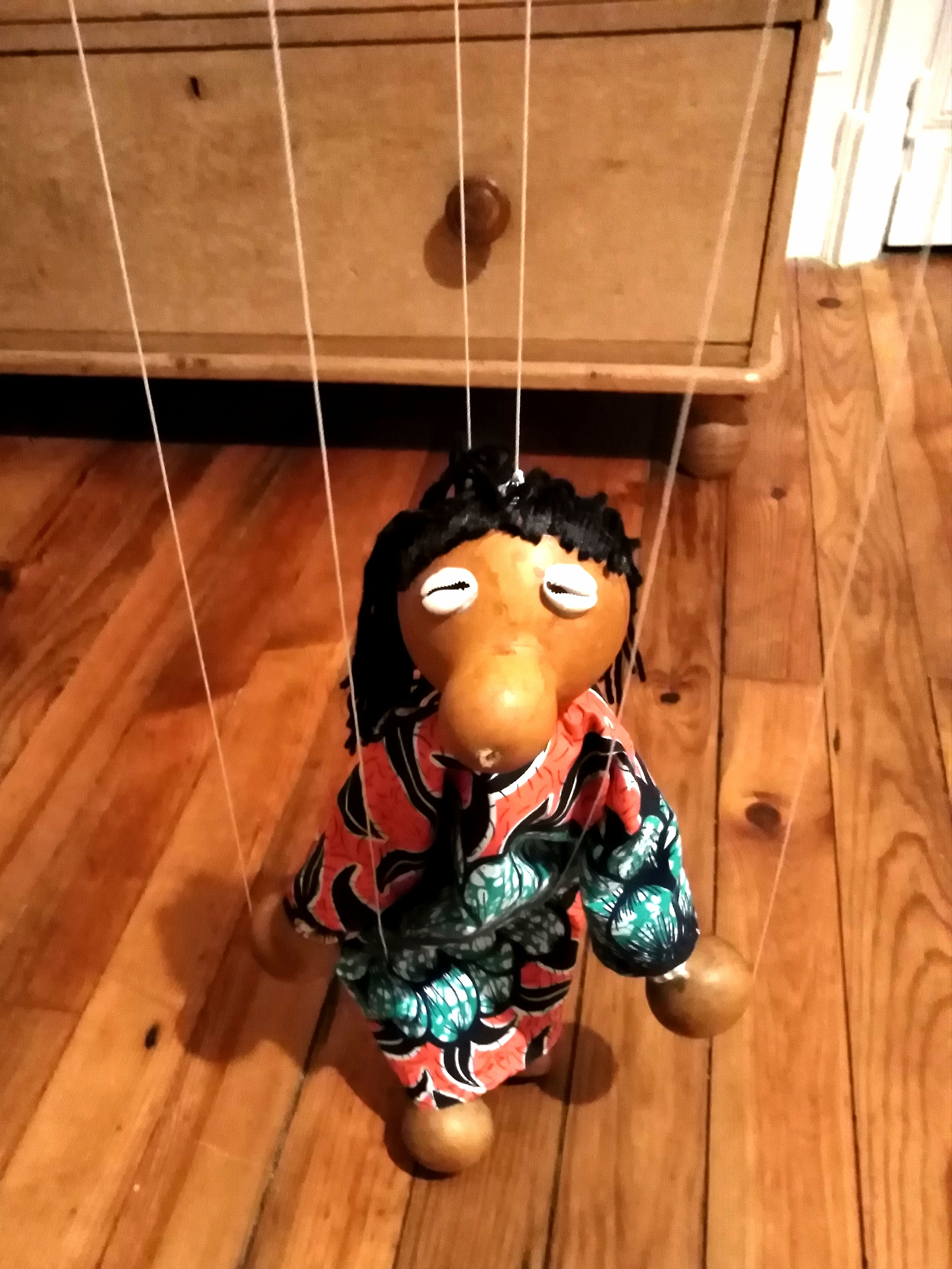
Calabash puppet (Marionette) (2020)

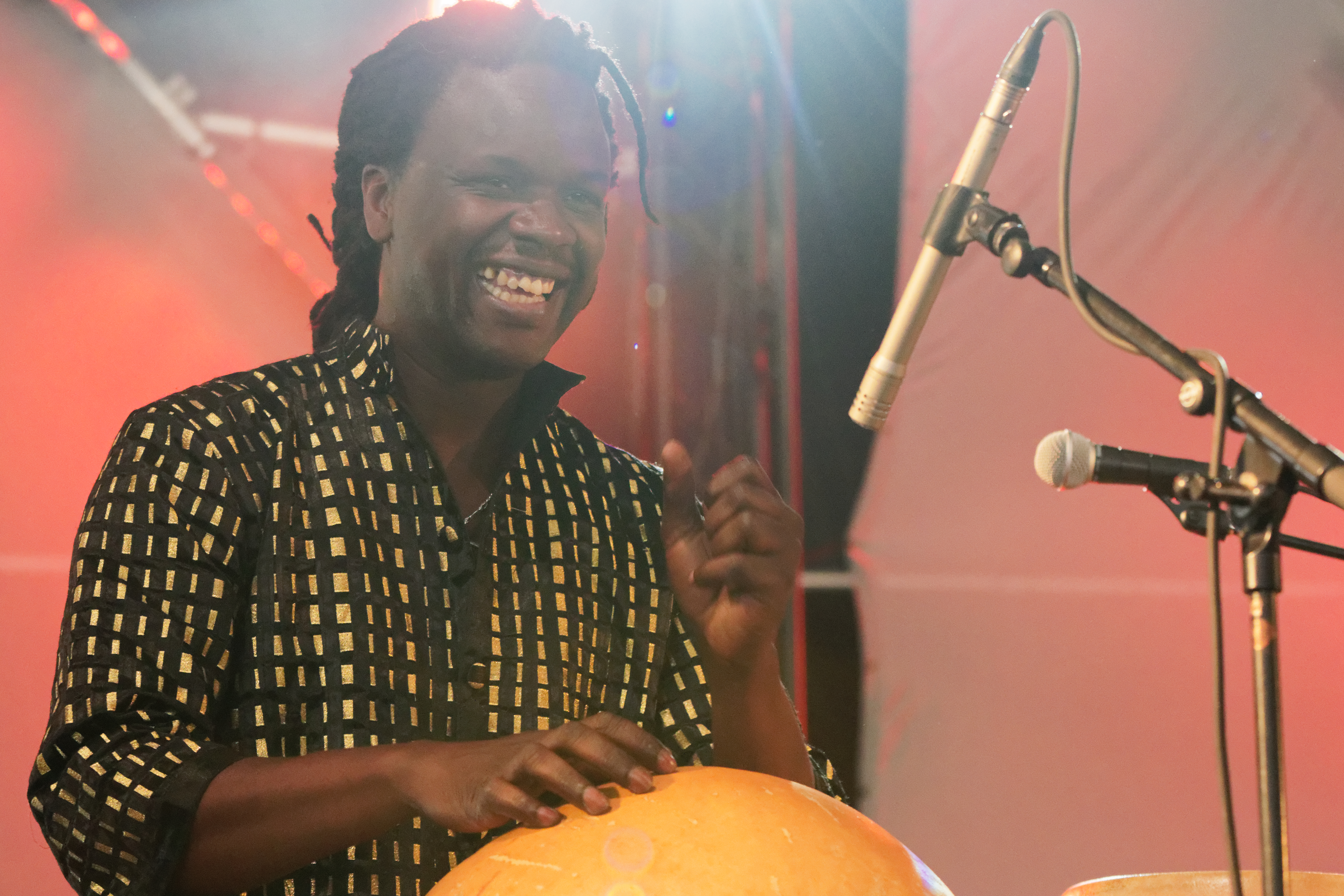
The African percussion calabash (2017)

=== China ===
The húlu (葫芦/葫蘆), as the calabash is called in Mandarin Chinese, is an ancient symbol for health. Hulu had fabled healing properties due to doctors in former times carrying medicine inside it. The hulu was believed to absorb negative, earth-based qi (energy) that would otherwise affect health, and is a traditional Chinese medicine cure. The bottle gourd is a symbol of the Eight Immortals, and particularly Li Tieguai, who is associated with medicine. Li Tieguai's gourd was said to carry medicine that could cure any illness and never emptied, which he dispensed to the poor and needy. Some folk myths say the "gourd had spirals of smoke ascend from it, denoting his power of setting his spirit free from his body," and that it "served as a bedroom for the night..." The gourd is also an attribute of the deity Shouxing and a symbol of longevity.

Dried calabash were also used as containers for liquids, often liquors or medicines. Calabash gourds were also grown in earthen molds to form different shapes with imprinted floral or arabesque designs. Molded gourds were also dried to house pet crickets. The texture of the gourd lends itself nicely to the sound of the insect, much like a musical instrument. The musical instrument, hulusi, is a kind of flute made from the gourd.

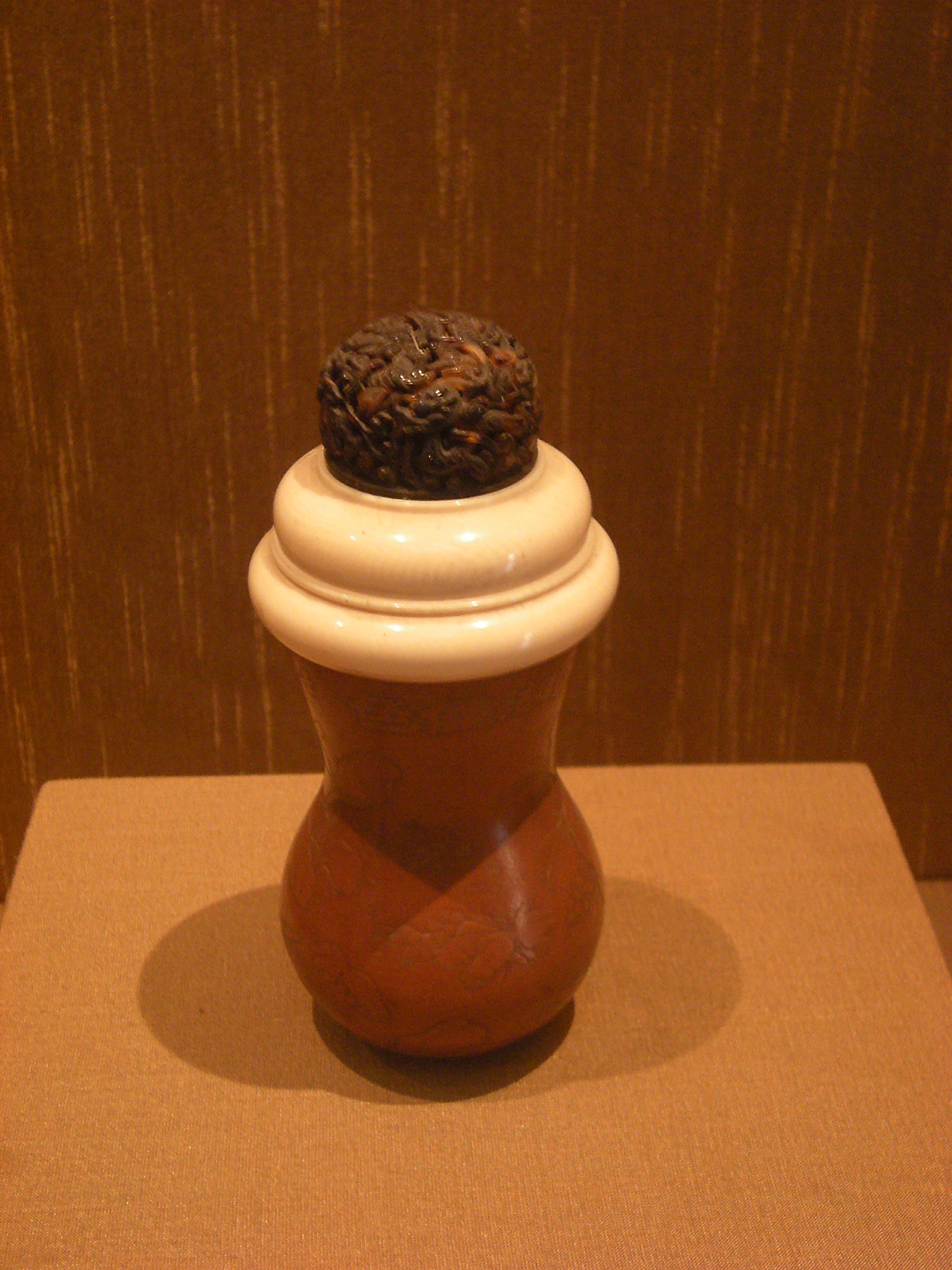
A Qing dynasty cricket cage

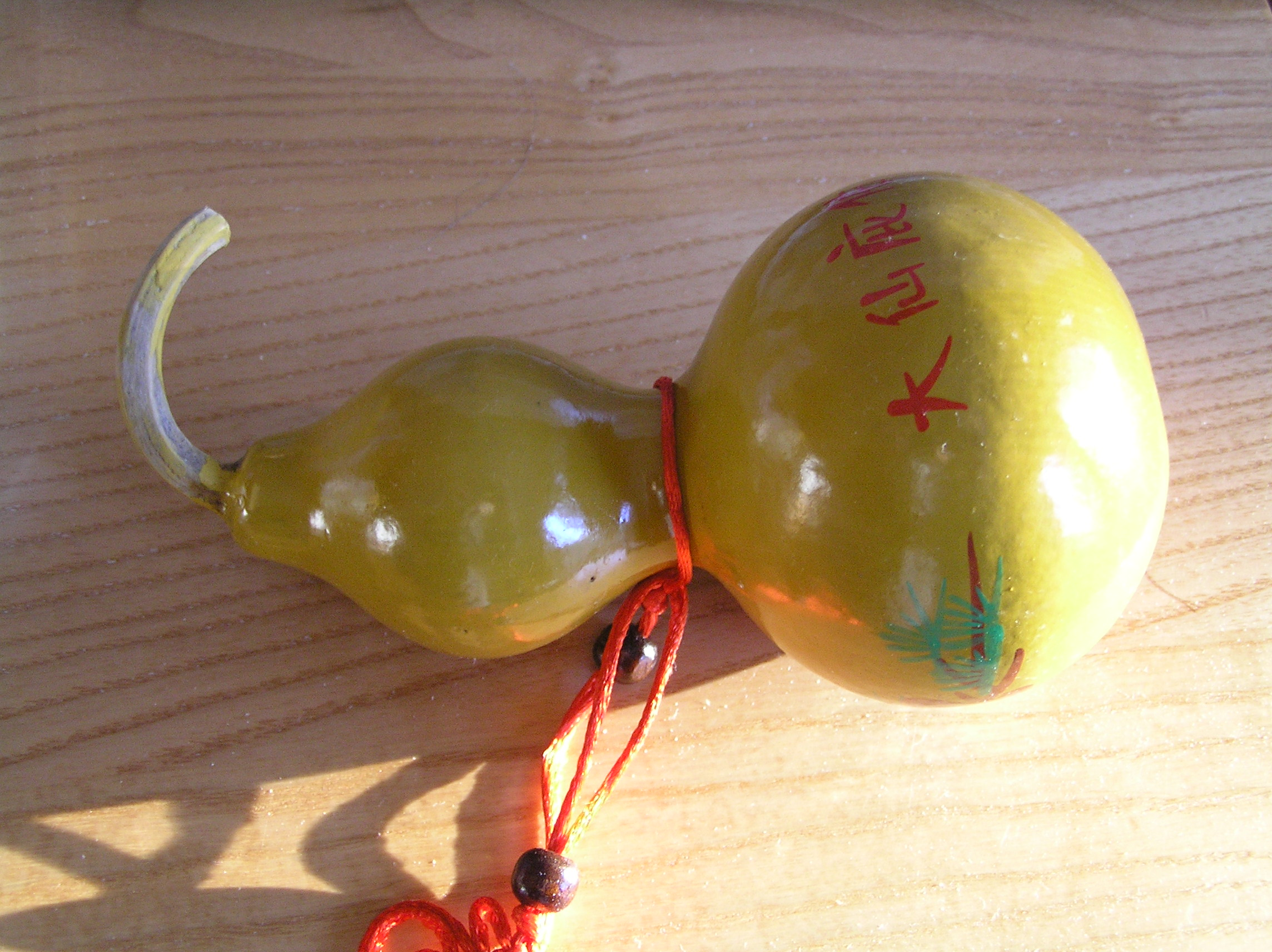
A bottle gourd

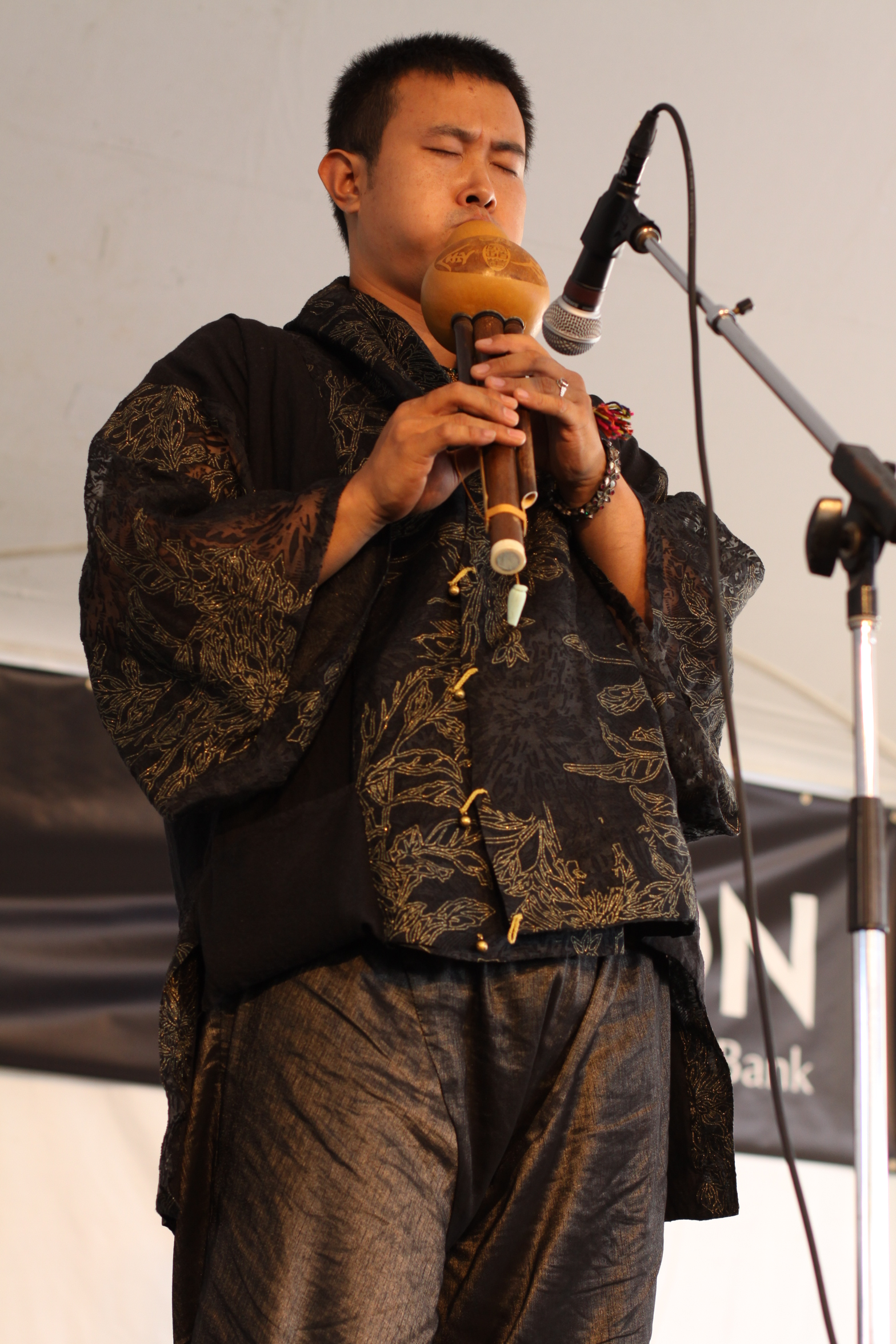
A hulusi, the calabash gourd flute or bottle gourd flute

=== Polynesia ===
The plant is spread throughout Polynesia known by hue in many related languages.

In Hawaii the word "calabash" refers to a large serving bowl, usually made from hardwood rather than from the calabash gourd, which is used on a buffet table or in the middle of the dining table. The use of the calabash in Hawaii has led to terms like "calabash family" or "calabash cousins", indicating an extended family grown up around shared meals and close friendships. This gourd is often dried when ripe and used as a percussion instrument called an ipu heke (double gourd drum) or just Ipu in contemporary and ancient hula.

The Māori people of New Zealand grew several cultivars of calabash for particular uses like ipu kai cultivars as food containers (including storage of preserved meat) and tahā wai cultivars as water gourds. They believed the gourd as a representation of Pū-tē-hue, one of Tāne (their god of forests)'s offspring. Several types of taonga pūoro (musical instruments) are made from gourds, including types of flute (ororuarangi, kōauau ponga ihu) and shakers (hue rarā, hue puruwai).

=== India ===
The calabash is used as a resonator in many string instruments in India. Instruments that look like guitars are made of wood, but can have a calabash resonator at the end of the strings table, called toomba. The sitar, the surbahar, the tanpura (north of India, tambura south of India), may have a toomba. In some cases, the toomba may not be functional, but if the instrument is large, it is retained because of its balance function, which is the case of the Saraswati veena. Other instruments like rudra veena and vichitra veena have two large calabash resonators at both ends of the strings table. The instrument, Gopichand used by the Baul singers of Bengal is made out of calabash. The practice is also common among Buddhist and Jain sages.

These toombas are made of dried calabash gourds, using special cultivars that were originally imported from Africa and Madagascar. They are mostly grown in Bengal and near Miraj, Maharashtra. These gourds are valuable items and they are carefully tended; for example, they are sometimes given injections to stop worms and insects from making holes in them while they are drying.

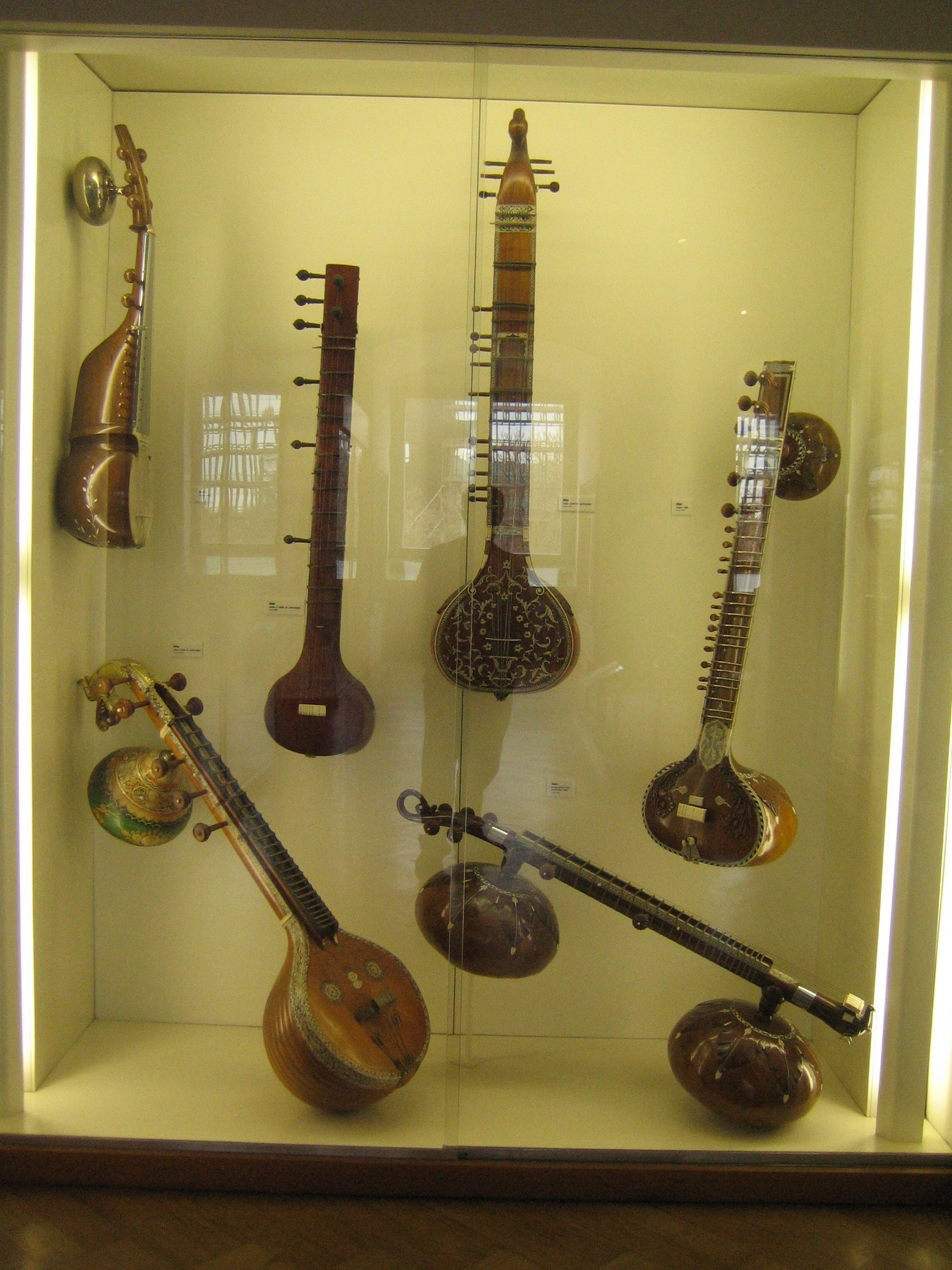
Sitars and one rudra veena (bottom right)

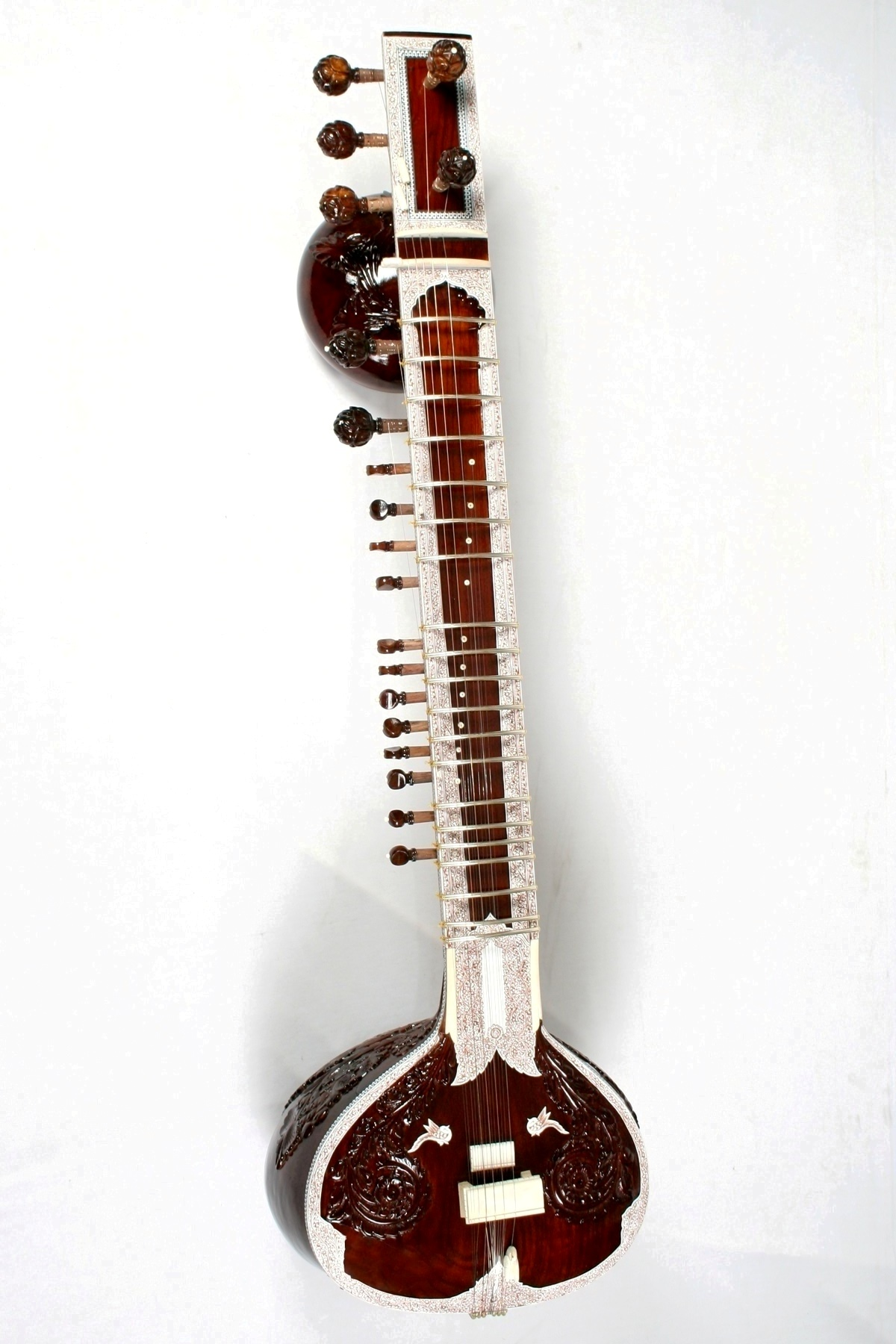
Sitar with resonator made from a bottle gourd. Surbahar is similar but larger and with lower sounds (something like a bass sitar)

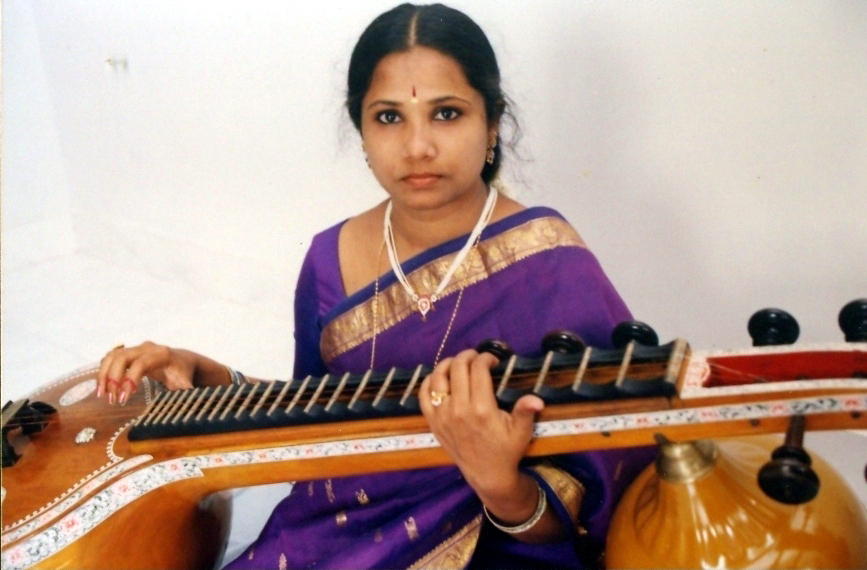
Saraswati veena, the calabash resonator is not always functional but it is kept in place because of the balancing effect.

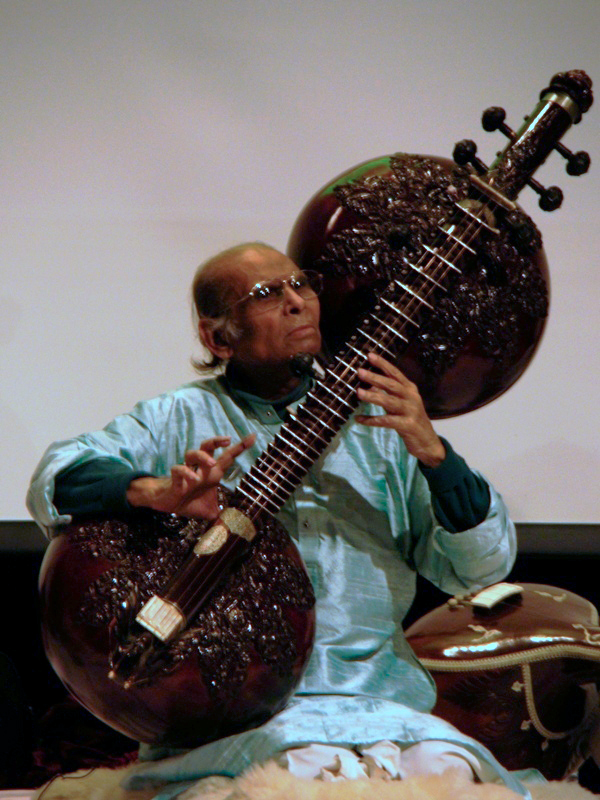
Rudra veena is a large plucked string instrument used in Hindustani classical music. One of the major types of veena played in Indian classical music, it has two calabash gourd resonators. The vichitra veena, also with two large resonators, is a similar instrument.

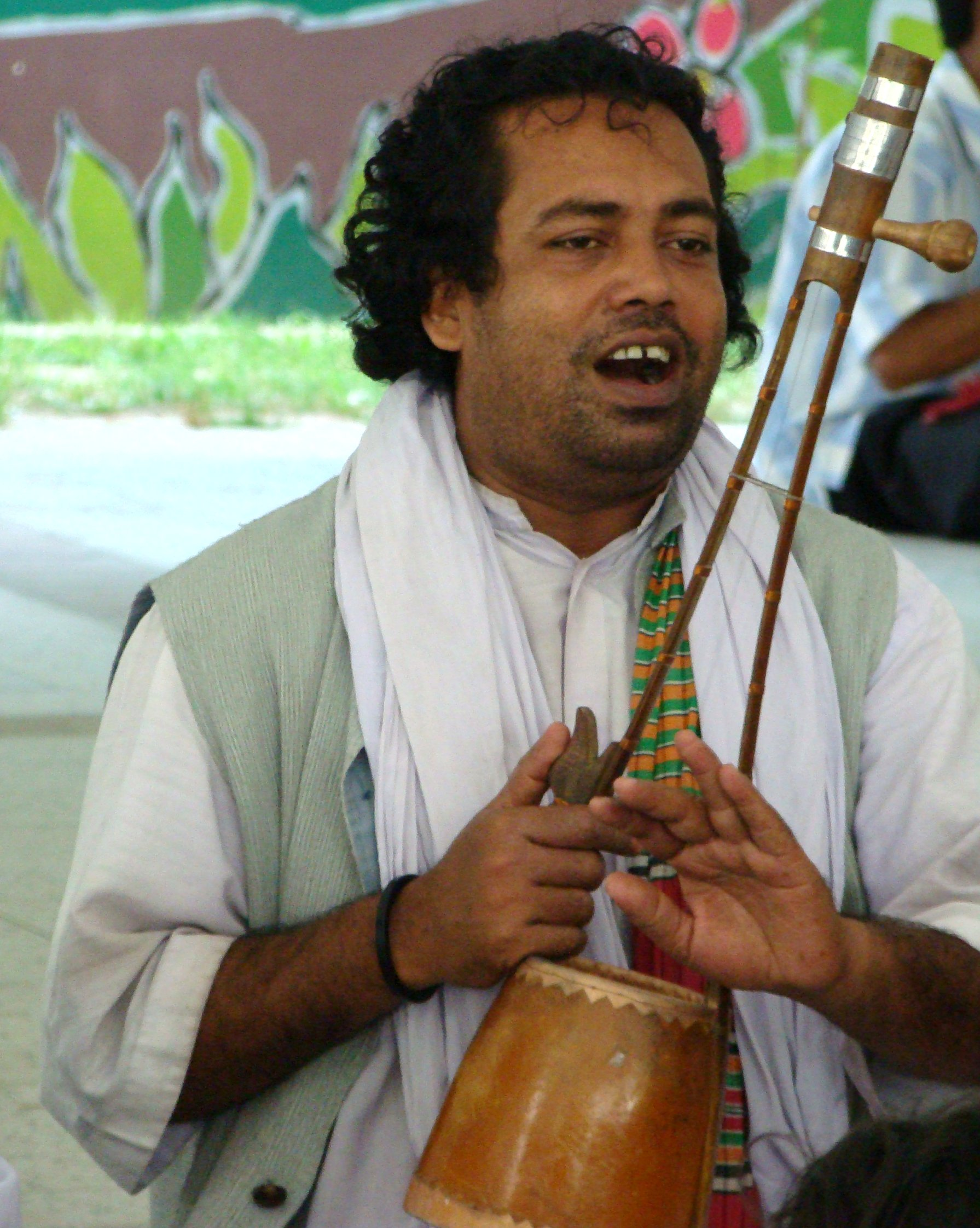
Ektara (one string) resonator made from a calabash gourd

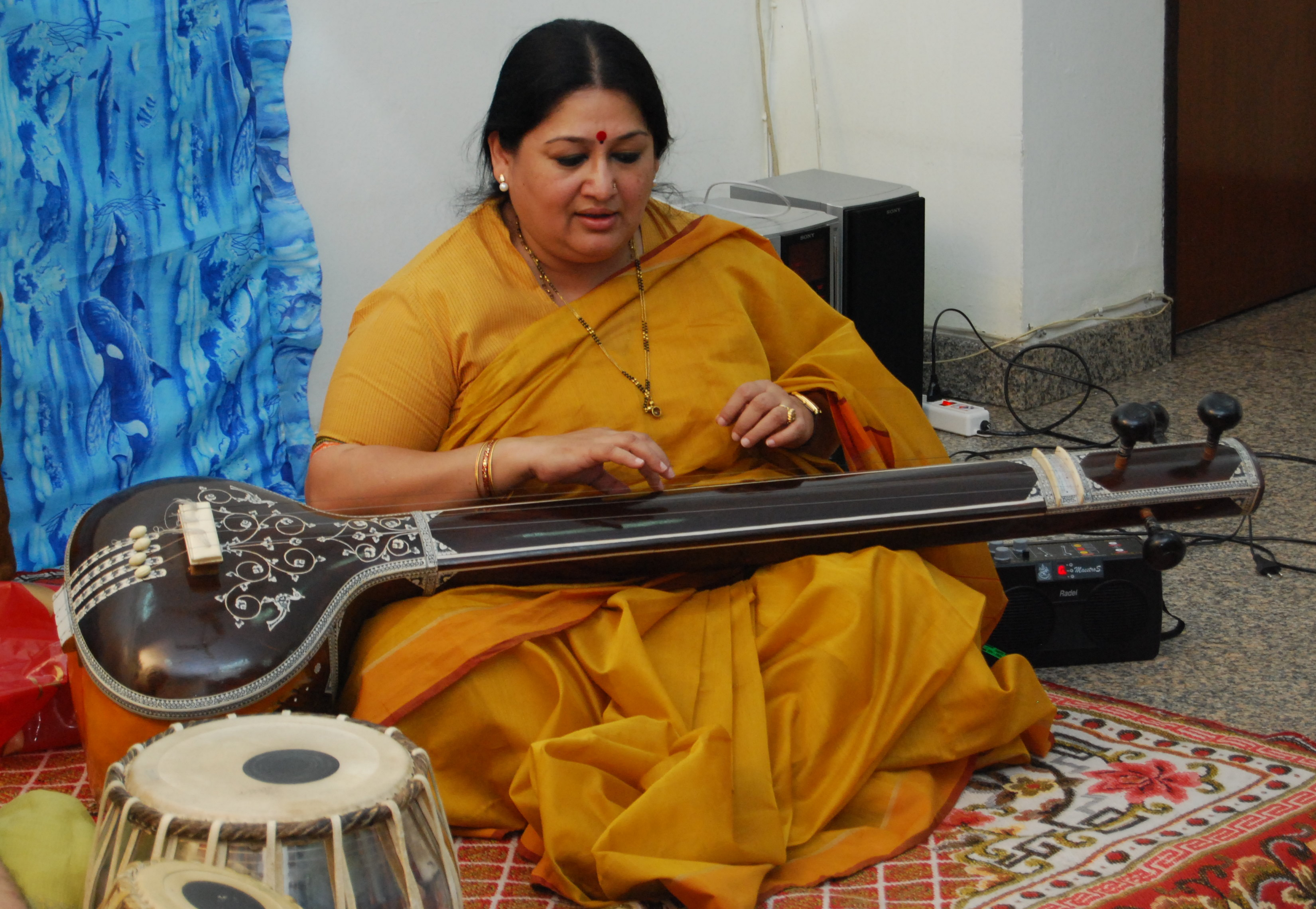
The tambura or tanpura may have a toomba (although not in this picture), a resonator made of calabash at the end of the strings table.

Hindu ascetics (sadhu) traditionally use a dried gourd vessel called the kamandalu. The juice of a bottle gourd is considered to have medicinal properties and be very healthy (see juice toxicity above).

In parts of India a dried, unpunctured gourd is used as a float (called surai-kuduvai in Tamil) to help people learn to swim in rural areas.

=== Philippines ===
In the Philippines, dried calabash gourds are one common material for making a traditional salakot hat.

In 2012, Teófilo García of Abra in Luzon, an expert artisan who makes the Ilocano tamburaw variant using calabash, was awarded by the National Commission for Culture and the Arts with the "Gawad sa Manlilikha ng Bayan" (National Living Treasures Award). He was cited for his dedication to practising and teaching the craft as an intangible cultural heritage of the Philippines under the Traditional Craftsmanship category.

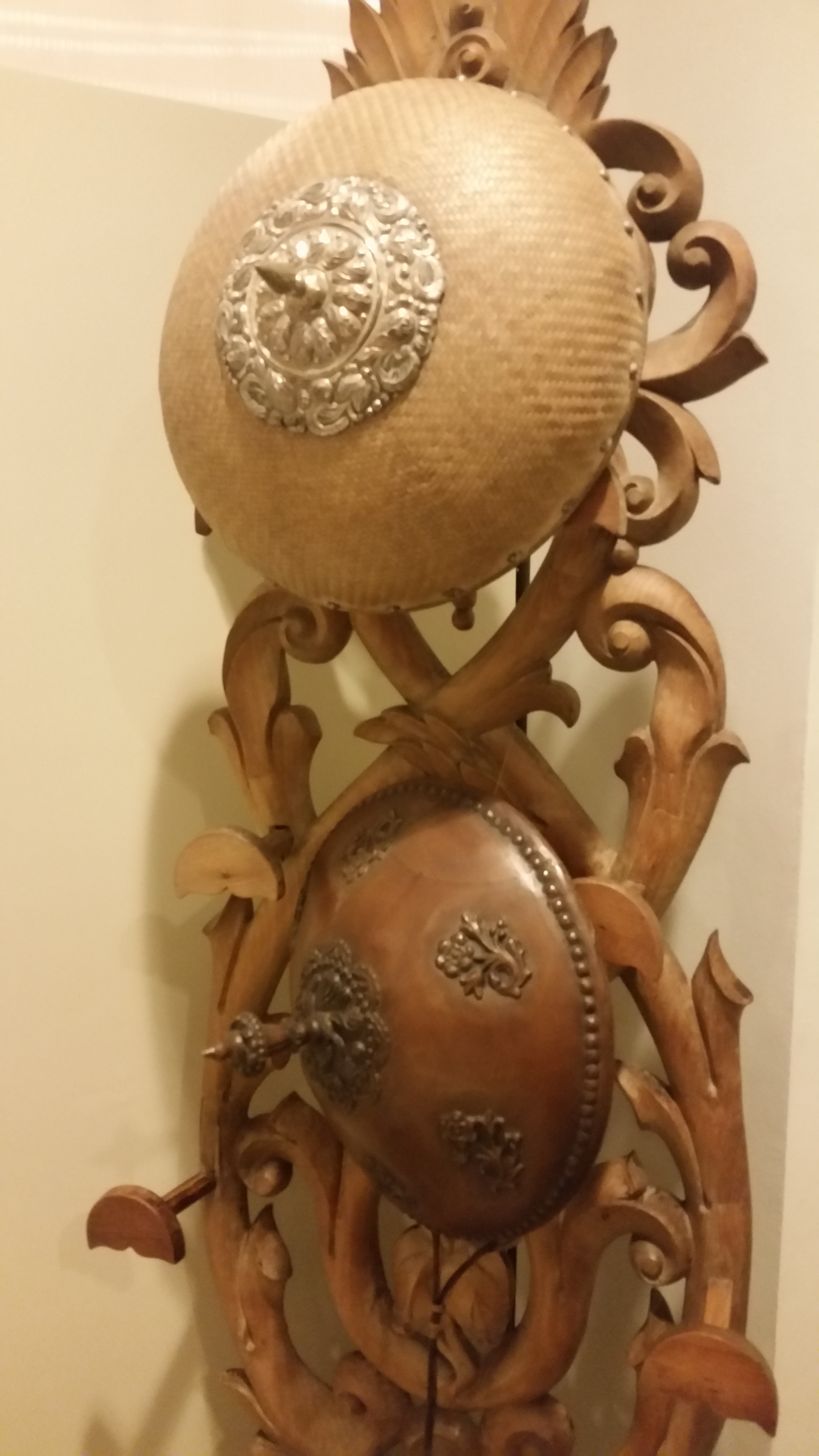
Salakot in the Bangko Sentral ng Pilipinas Money Museum, with the bottom one made from calabash

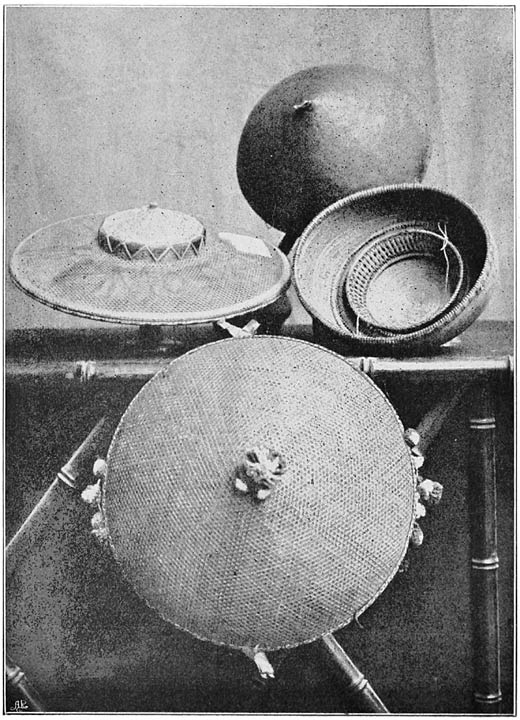
Salakot from the Philippines (c.1900), the top one is made from calabash

=== New Guinea ===
Among some New Guinea highland tribes, the calabash is used by men as a penis sheath.

=== South America ===
In Argentina, Uruguay, Paraguay, Chile and southern Brazil, calabash gourds are dried and carved into mates (from the Quichua word mathi, adopted into the Spanish language), the traditional container for mate, the caffeinated, tea-like drink brewed from the yerba mate plant. In the region the beverage itself is called mate as well as the calabash from which the drinking vessels are made. In Peru it is used in a popular practice for the making of mate burilado; "burilado" is the technique adopted for decorating the mate calabashes.

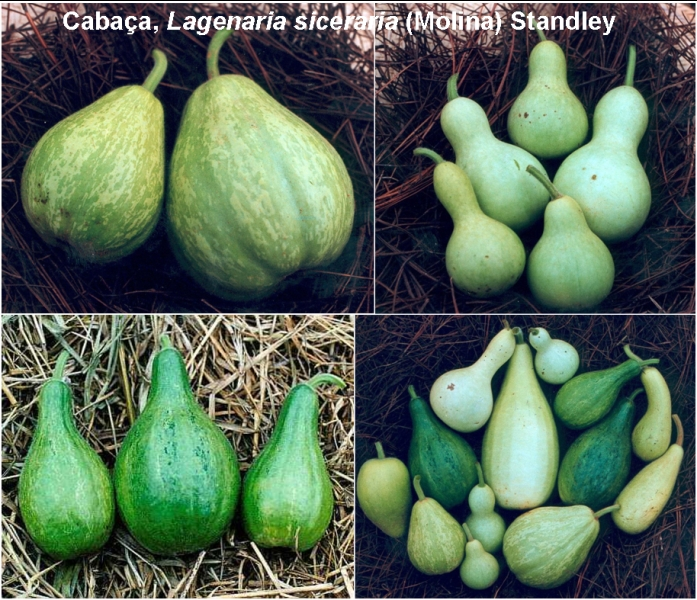
L. siceraria "mate" type

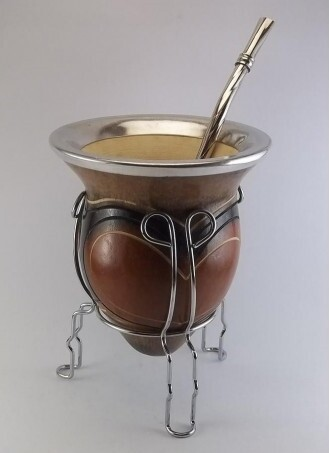
Calabash used as a container for drinking mate with a metal bombilla

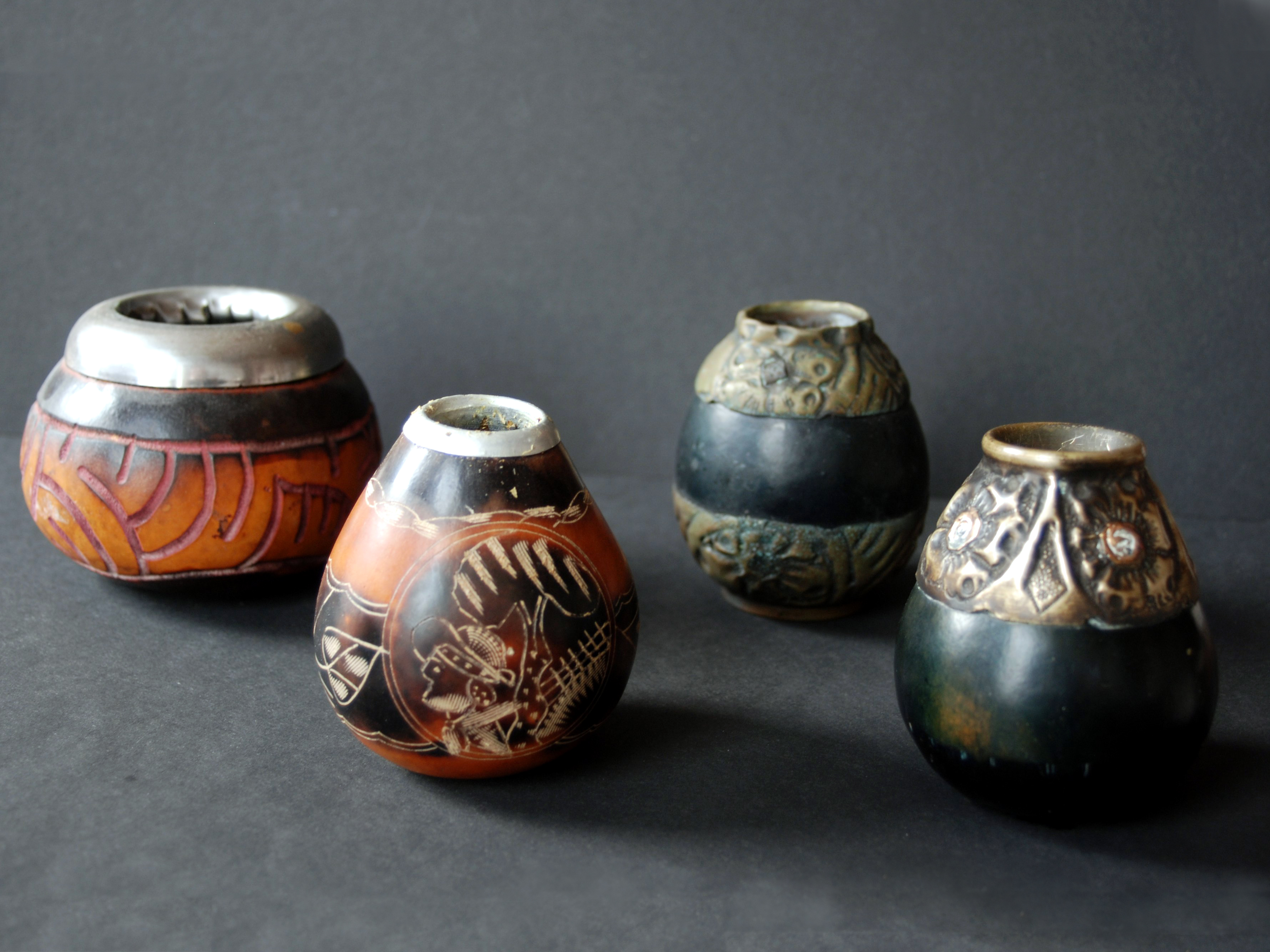
Mate carved and decorated as a drinking container (also called mate, and the infusion also called mate)

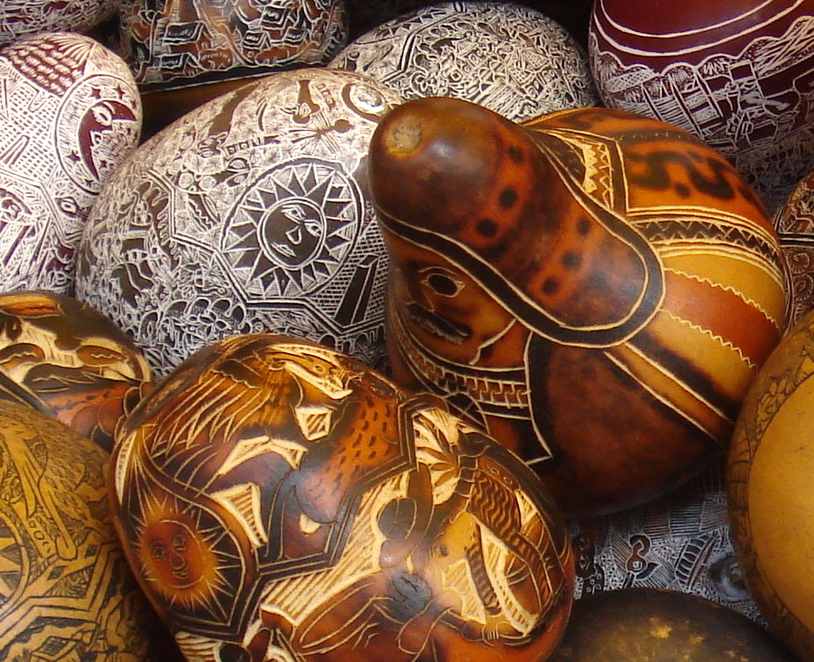
Mate burilado in Peru

In Peru, Bolivia and Ecuador calabash gourds are used for medicinal purposes. The Inca culture applied symbols from folklore to gourds, this practice is still familiar and valued.

=== North America ===
Calabash's watertight features allowed it to be often used as a container to ship seeds across the translantic slave trade. They were also used by enslaved people to carry seeds for planting on plantation fields. On plantations that held enslaved African Americans, the calabash symbolized freedom—as alluded to in the song "Follow the Drinking Gourd" that referenced the Big Dipper constellation that was used to guide the Underground Railroad.

== Other uses ==
=== Tobacco smoking pipe ===
The gourd can be dried and used to smoke pipe tobacco. According to American consular reports from the early 20th century calabash pipes were commonly used in South Africa. Calabash was said to bestow a "special softness" of flavor that could not be duplicated by other materials. The lining was made of meerschaum, though tin was used for low-grade models. A typical design yielded by this squash is recognized (theatrically) as the pipe of Sherlock Holmes, but the inventor of this character, Sir Arthur Conan Doyle, never mentioned Holmes using a calabash pipe. It was the preferred pipe for stage actors portraying Holmes, because they could balance this pipe better than other styles while delivering their lines.

=== Enema equipment ===
The gourd is used traditionally to administer enemas. Along the upper Congo River an enema apparatus is made by making a hole in one end of the gourd for filling it, and using a resin to attach a hollow cane to the gourd's neck.
