= 2026 Huancayo earthquake =

Magnitude 5.5 earthquake in Peru

- Location within Peru
- UTC time: 2026-07-19 02:24:36
- ISC event: 646040946
- USGS-ANSS: ComCat
- Local date: 18 July 2026
- Local time: 21:24:36 PET (UTC-5)
- Magnitude: M_{w} 5.5
- Depth: 10 km (6.2 mi)
- Epicenter: 12.104°S 75.303°W
- Areas affected: Junín and Huancavelica departments, Peru
- Max. intensity: MMI VII (Very strong)
- Aftershocks: 12+, largest M_{ww} 5.3
- Casualties: 6 dead, 200 injured (mainshock); 15 injured (6 August aftershock); 1 dead, 4 injured (7 August aftershock)

A M_{w} 5.5 earthquake struck the department of Junín, Peru, on 18 July 2026, at 21:24:36 PET. Its epicenter was located near the city of Huancayo, and caused severe damage in the epicentral area, including the collapse of hundreds of homes. At least six people were killed and 200 were injured. Fifteen people were injured as a result of a M_{ww} 5.0-5.3 aftershock on 6 August, and in 7 August, another person died and four others were injured as a result of another aftershock with a magnitude of 4.4-4.7.

== Tectonic setting ==
Earthquakes in Peru are mainly concentrated at the subduction zone where the Nazca Plate subducts beneath the South American Plate at the Peru–Chile Trench off its west coast. Another zone of seismicity is recorded within the South American Plate in the Andes region. In the high Andes, shallow earthquakes are the result of normal-faulting such as the 1946 Ancash earthquake which ruptured a shallow-dipping fault oriented parallel to the range. The western margin of the Cordillera Blanca in central Peru exhibits normal-faulting and coincides with extensional tectonics acting perpendicular to the range.

While normal-faulting is the dominant mechanism, parts of the western sub-Andes experience thrust tectonics. This zone is located between the high Andes and Amazonian Craton and is characterised by active fold and thrusting since the Pliocene. The occurrence of northwest-trending, west-dipping thrust faults in the belt suggest the Amazonian craton is being thrusted beneath the Cordillera Oriental. A possible cause of these earthquakes is intraplate deformation in response to subduction of the Nazca Plate. Most thrust earthquakes in the region occur on steep-angled fault planes ranging from 30 to 60° at depths of 10 to 38 km (6.2 to 23.6 mi), corresponding to the lower crust and upper mantle.

== Earthquake ==
The United States Geological Survey (USGS) put the magnitude and depth at M_{ww} 5.5 and 10 km (6.2 mi), respectively. Its epicenter was located 2 km (1.2 mi) west-southwest of the town of Sicaya in the eponymous district, or 10 km (6.2 mi) west-northwest of Huancayo. The Modified Mercalli intensity was estimated to have been VII (Very strong) in Chupaca and Huancayo, VI (Strong) in Concepción, and III (Weak) in Lima. The Geophysical Institute of Peru however reported that the quake was located 7 km (4.3 mi) south of Chupaca, had a magnitude of 5.4, and occurred at a depth of 9 km (5.6 mi). According to the IGP, the quake reached a maximum intensity of IV-V in Chupaca. As of July 19, a total of 12 aftershocks have been detected, the largest of them had a magnitude of 3.7.

On August 6, nearly three weeks after the mainshock, a magnitude 5.0 quake struck 19 km (12 mi) southwest of Chupaca. The IGP identified it as an aftershock of the July 18 quake. The USGS however reported its magnitude as M_{ww} 5.3 and located 7 km (4.3 mi) south southwest of Huayucachi.

== Impact ==
At least six people were killed and 200 others were injured. At least 471 houses were destroyed and 4,889 others were damaged, displacing 6,384 residents and affecting 5,797 more. Fifty-four schools, 18 health establishments, and 1,016 m (3,333 ft) of roads were also affected. 3,302 livestock were lost. Four fatalities and 23 injuries were reported in Chongos Bajo, Chupaca province. One person died in Huacrapuquio District, Huancayo Province, while another person died and 128 others were injured in Chupuro District in the same province. Forty-one people were injured in Chongos Alto District and eight in Huasicancha District. Most of the houses that were damaged or destroyed were made of adobe and quincha. A religious monument named the Señor de Cani Cruz also collapsed in the district. Houses also collapsed in Chupuro, Huacrapuquio and Tres de Diciembre Districts. Collapsing houses also trapped people in Pucará District, while minor building damage, such as broken windows and cracked tiles, was reported in the city of Huancayo. The districts of Sapallanga, Chilca, Cullhuas, Acostambo, Pazos and Huaribamba in Junín and Huancavelica departments also reported damage and power outages.

On 22 July, rockfalls occurred following a magnitude 3.6 aftershock that struck 17 km (11 mi) south of Chupaca. At least 40 homes collapsed or were uninhabitable as a result of the series of aftershocks measuring 3.0 to 3.6. In August 6, a magnitude 5.0 aftershock injured 15 people, mainly due to rockfalls that hit vehicles and the collapse of adobe walls near the epicenter and damaged or destroyed more than 125 homes. Another aftershock the day after with a magnitude of 4.4 caused the death of the driver of a Mitsubishi L200 after a rockfall struck the vehicle in Chupuro District, and the injury of four others.

== Response ==
President-elect Keiko Fujimori extended her condolences to the families of the deceased and expressed her solidarity with those affected by the disaster. Following the earthquake, the Peruvian government launched emergency response operations across the affected areas of Junín Department. Prime Minister Luis Arroyo Sánchez, Defense Minister Amadeo Flores Carcagno, and INDECI chief Luis Enrique Vásquez Guerrero visited Chongos Bajo to assess the damage and coordinate relief efforts with regional and local officials. The Peruvian Army was also deployed to assist with search and rescue operations, debris removal, public security, and humanitarian assistance, while health authorities established three temporary medical posts in Pumpunya to provide care for affected residents. The Regional Government of Junín also set up a temporary shelter and distributed emergency supplies, including blankets, tents, beds, and mattresses. Additionally, the government announced plans to declare a state of emergency following INDECI's damage assessment and dispatched humanitarian aid from Lima to support communities impacted by the earthquake. On 20 July, humanitarian groups commenced the distribution of over 11 tonnes of emergency supplies to the areas most affected by the quake. The delivery contained 800 emergency aid packages with food, bottled water, hygiene products, and blankets. In Huancayo, volunteers came together to put the kits together, while the Peruvian Army and National Police helped to deliver the assistance to the affected communities.

== See also ==
- List of earthquakes in 2026
- List of earthquakes in Peru
- 1947 Satipo earthquake
- 2014 Peru earthquake
