= Yawray =

Mountain in Peru

- Location within Peru

Highest point
- Elevation: 5,112 m (16,772 ft)
- Coordinates: 12°37′29″S 75°31′14″W

Geography
- Location: Peru, Huancavelica Region, Junín Region
- Parent range: Andes

Yawray (Quechua for to burn, Hispanicized spelling Yauray) is a 5,112-metre-high (16,772 ft) mountain in the Andes of Peru. It is located in the Huancavelica Region, Huancavelica Province, Acobambilla District, and in the Junín Region, Huancayo Province, Chongos Alto District. Yawray lies west of Puka and Warmi Mach'ay. Yawray is situated northwest of Aqchiqucha and northeast of Warmiqucha which belong to the largest lakes of Peru.
