= Walsaqucha =

Lake in Peru

- Location within Peru
- Location: Peru; Junín Region
- Coordinates: 12°35′45″S 75°28′57″W

Walsaqucha (Quechua walsa raft, qucha lake, "raft lake", Hispanicized spelling Balsacocha) is a lake in Peru located in the Junín Region, Huancayo Province, Chongos Alto District. It is situated between Yuraqqucha in the north and Aqchiqucha in the south. The mountain at the southern end of the lake is Walsa.
