= Sicaya =

Sicaya may refer to:

- Sicaya, Bolivia, a town in the Cochabamba Department in Bolivia.
- Sicaya, Peru, a town in the Junín Region in Peru.
- Sicaya Canton, a canton in the Sicaya Municipality in Bolivia.
- Sicaya District, a district in the Huancayo Province in Peru.
- Sicaya Municipality a municipality in the Capinota Province in Bolivia.
