= Walsa =

Mountain in Peru

- Location within Peru

Highest point
- Elevation: 4,800 m (15,700 ft)
- Coordinates: 12°36′31″S 75°28′18″W

Geography
- Location: Peru, Junín Region
- Parent range: Andes

Walsa (Quechua for raft, Hispanicized spelling Balsa (Spanish for raft, from Quechua) is a 4,800-metre-high (15,748 ft) mountain in the Andes of Peru. It is located in the Junín Region, Huancayo Province, Chongos Alto District. Walsa lies west of Kapillayuq between the lakes Ñawinqucha in the east and Walsaqucha in the northwest.
