= Puka (Peru) =

Mountain in Peru

- Location within Peru

Highest point
- Elevation: 4,993 m (16,381 ft)
- Coordinates: 12°38′02″S 75°34′09″W

Geography
- Location: Peru, Huancavelica Region, Junín Region
- Parent range: Andes

Puka (Quechua for red, Hispanicized spelling Puca) is a 4,993-metre-high (16,381 ft) mountain in the Andes of Peru. It is situated in the Huancavelica Region, Huancavelica Province, Acobambilla District, and in the Junín Region, Huancayo Province, Chongos Alto District. Puka lies southeast of Warmi Mach'ay, between the lakes named Warmiqucha in the southeast and Quylluqucha in the north.
