= Wira Challwa =

Mountain in Peru

- Location within Peru

Highest point
- Elevation: 4,760 m (15,620 ft)
- Coordinates: 12°28′55″S 75°25′46″W

Geography
- Location: Peru, Junín Region
- Parent range: Andes

Wira Challwa (Quechua wira fat, challwa fish, "fat fish", Hispanicized spelling Huirachaygua) is a 4,760-metre-high (15,617 ft) mountain in the Andes of Peru and the name of a small lake near of the mountain. It is located in the Junín Region, Huancayo Province, Chongos Alto District. Wira Challwa lies west of Waqra Willka.

The little lake named Wira Challwa lies northeast of the mountain at 12°28′27″S 75°25′21″W.
