= Pilcomayo =

Pilcomayo may refer to:

- Pilcomayo River
- Pilcomayo Department, Argentina
- Apostolic Vicariate of Pilcomayo, a pre-diocesan Catholic missionary jurisdiction in Paraguay
- Pilcomayo District, Peru
- Peruvian gunboat Pilcomayo a gunboat of the Peruvian and Chilean navies.
