= Chicche =

Chicche may refer to:

- Thomas Chicche of the noble Chicche family of Canterbury, England
- Chicche District
