= Lake Canllacocha =

Lake in Peru

- Location within Peru
- Location: Huancavelica Region
- Coordinates: 12°41′10″S 75°28′56″W
- Basin countries: Peru
- Surface area: 86.96 ha (214.9 acres)

Lake Canllacocha (possibly from Quechua kanlla, kanlli pearlfruit (Margyricarpus pinnatus), qucha lake) is a lake in Peru located in the Huancavelica Region, Huancavelica Province, Acobambilla District. Canllacocha lies east of the larger Lake Huarmicocha and south of Lake Acchicocha of the Junín Region.

== See also ==
- List of lakes in Peru
