= Pucará District =

Pucará District may refer to one of three districts in Peru:

- Pucará District, Huancayo
- Pucará District, Jaén
- Pucará District, Lampa
