= Colca District =

Colca District may refer to:

- Colca District, Huancayo
- Colca District, Victor Fajardo
