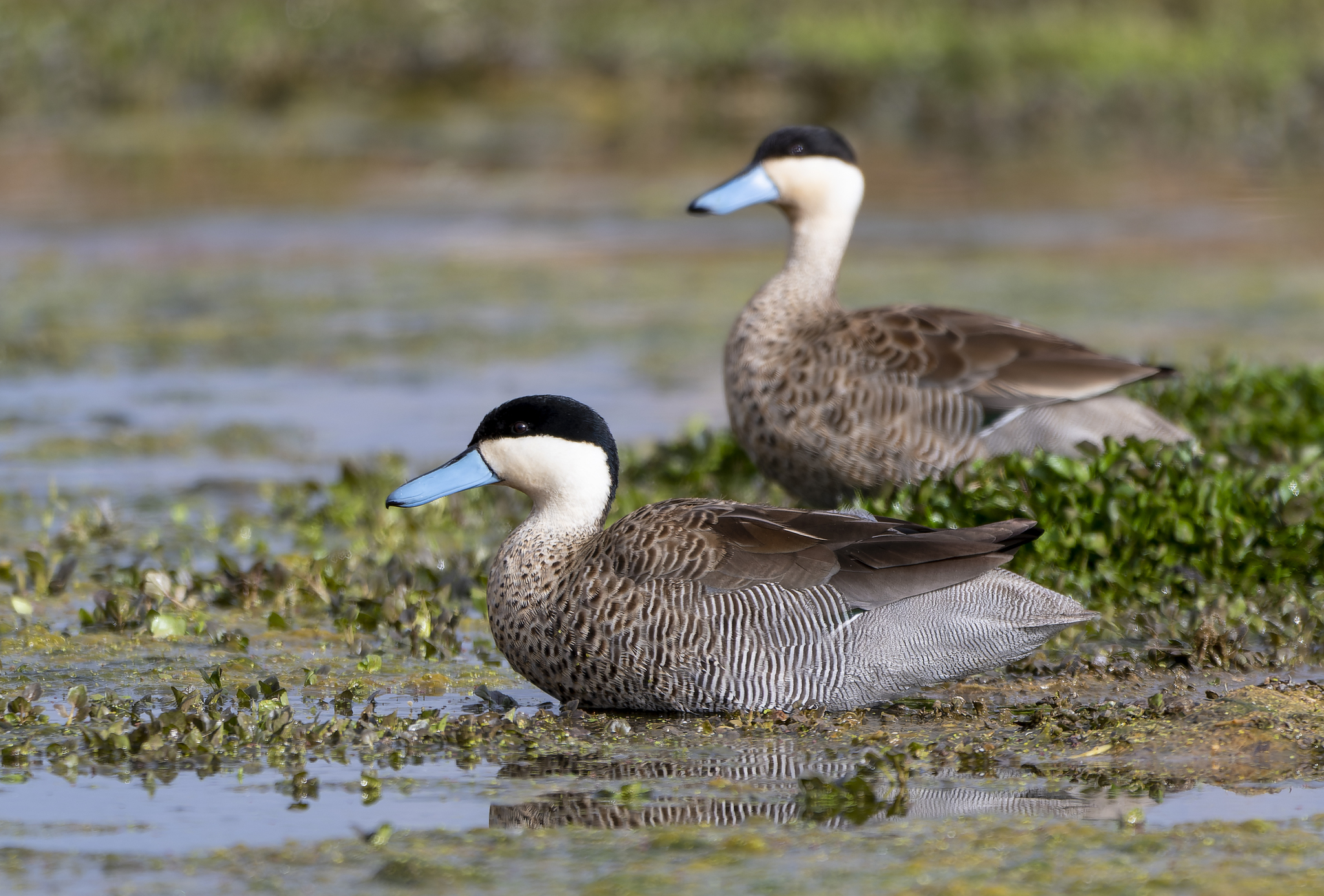
- Puna teal in Huasicancha District at 4,000 meters in the Peruvian Andes

Conservation status
- Least Concern (IUCN 3.1)

Scientific classification
- Kingdom: Animalia
- Phylum: Chordata
- Class: Aves
- Order: Anseriformes
- Family: Anatidae
- Genus: Spatula
- Species: S. puna

Binomial name
- Spatula puna (Tschudi, 1844)

Synonyms
- Anas versicolor puna Anas puna Punanetta puna

= Puna teal =

Species of bird

The Puna teal (Spatula puna) is a species of dabbling duck in the family Anatidae. It was at one time regarded as a subspecies of the silver teal (Spatula versicolor).

The Puna teal is resident in the Andes of Peru, western Bolivia, northern Chile, and extreme northwestern Argentina. It is found on the larger lakes and pools in the altiplano.

The status of the Puna teal is Least Concern, as listed on the IUCN Red List.

== Taxonomy ==
The first formal description of the Puna teal was by the Swiss naturalist Johann Jakob von Tschudi in 1844 under the binomial name Anas puna. It was at one time considered a subspecies of the silver teal in the genus Anas.

A molecular phylogenetic study comparing mitochondrial DNA sequences published in 2009 found that the genus Anas, as then defined, was non-monophyletic. This resulted in the split of the genus into four monophyletic genera with ten species, including the Puna teal, which moved into the resurrected genus Spatula. This marked the change of the Puna teal from a subspecies into a monotypic species. The genus Spatula was originally proposed by the German zoologist Friedrich Boie in 1822. The name Spatula is the Latin for a "spoon" or "spatula". The specific epithet puna is from the Puna de Atacama, a plateau in the Andes.

== Description ==
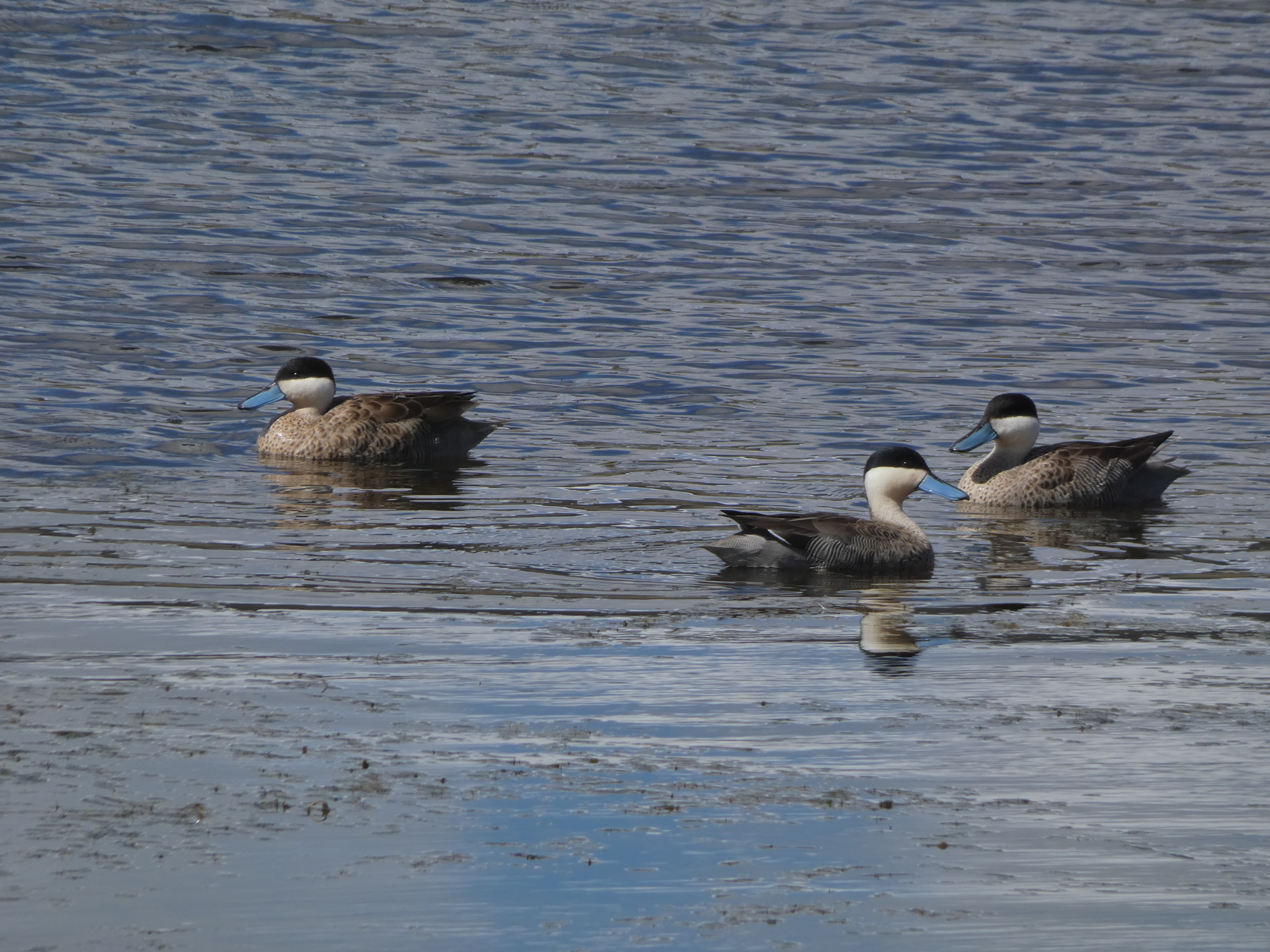
Puna teal at Conococha, Peru

=== Appearance ===
The Puna teal is larger than its closely related species, the silver teal (Spatula versicolor). It measures about 48 cm (19 in) long, similar in size to a wood duck. Males typically weigh between 546 to 560 g and have a wingspan of 215-235 mm. Their bill is 47-53 mm long, compared to 37-41 mm in S. versicolor.

Puna teal is easily recognized by its distinctive head and bill patterns. Adult males have a blackish-brown cap that extends below the eyes. They have a creamy white lower face and neck, a coffee-colored back, chest, and flank, and a dark brown rear flank. Their neck and chest are covered in small, dark brown spots that turn into bars on the back, chest, and flanks. Their rump and upper tail coverts appear gray. Their upper wing coverts are a dull blue color, greater secondary coverts are white-tipped, and they have an iridescent green speculum with posterior black and white bars. Their underwings are banded with gray. Their legs and feet are gray, and they have brown eyes and a distinctive light blue bill with a black nail and culmen.

Females are typically duller in color than males and have less distinct barring patterns on their flanks. Juveniles are also duller, with a less iridescent speculum and less contrasting head. Chicks have brown upper down and grayish-white lower down, with pairs of white dorsal spots along their wings and sides. They also have a narrow black eyestripe that trails back to their nape, and a grayish-blue colored bill that is larger than that of young S. versicolor individuals.

One case of leucism has been documented in this species, observed in the Huaypo Lake between the Peruvian provinces of Anta and Urubamba. The affected individual had a white head and neck, while the rest of its body retained the species' normal coloration.

=== Anatomy and Physiology ===
As a high-altitude resident waterfowl, Puna teal shows morphological adaptations in its respiratory systems compared to lower-elevation species. Studies on Lake Titicaca found that the Puna teal has larger mass-specific volumes of the lungs, secondary bronchi, parabronchi, and gas exchange tissues. They also have a higher proportion of blood vessels in their lungs. Their adapted respiratory structure allows for more efficient oxygen uptake, likely as an evolutionary response to living at high altitudes.

== Habitat and Distribution ==
The Puna teal is a non-migratory bird native to the Neotropical realm of South America. Its range is confined to the Puna zone of the Andes Mountains, extending from central Peru (around the Junín region) southward through western Bolivia, northern Chile (as far south as Antofagasta), and into the extreme northwest of Argentina (Jujuy Province).

This species is restricted to high-altitude environments, typically found at elevations up to 4,600 m (15,100 ft). It inhabits various freshwater wetland types, favoring weakly alkaline lakes, swamps, and bogs with abundant floating vegetation, particularly the aquatic plant genus Chara.

== Behavior ==
=== Diet and Feeding ===
Puna teal mostly feed on plants and seeds, but also often eat invertebrates. As dabbling ducks, they typically feed in the water by tipping forward till they are upside down, to get food from the bottom of water bodies, such as ponds. Their bills are specialized for removing food from the water using plates called lamellae, which are aligned along the edges of the bill and vary in length and distance between one another.

=== Mating and Reproduction ===
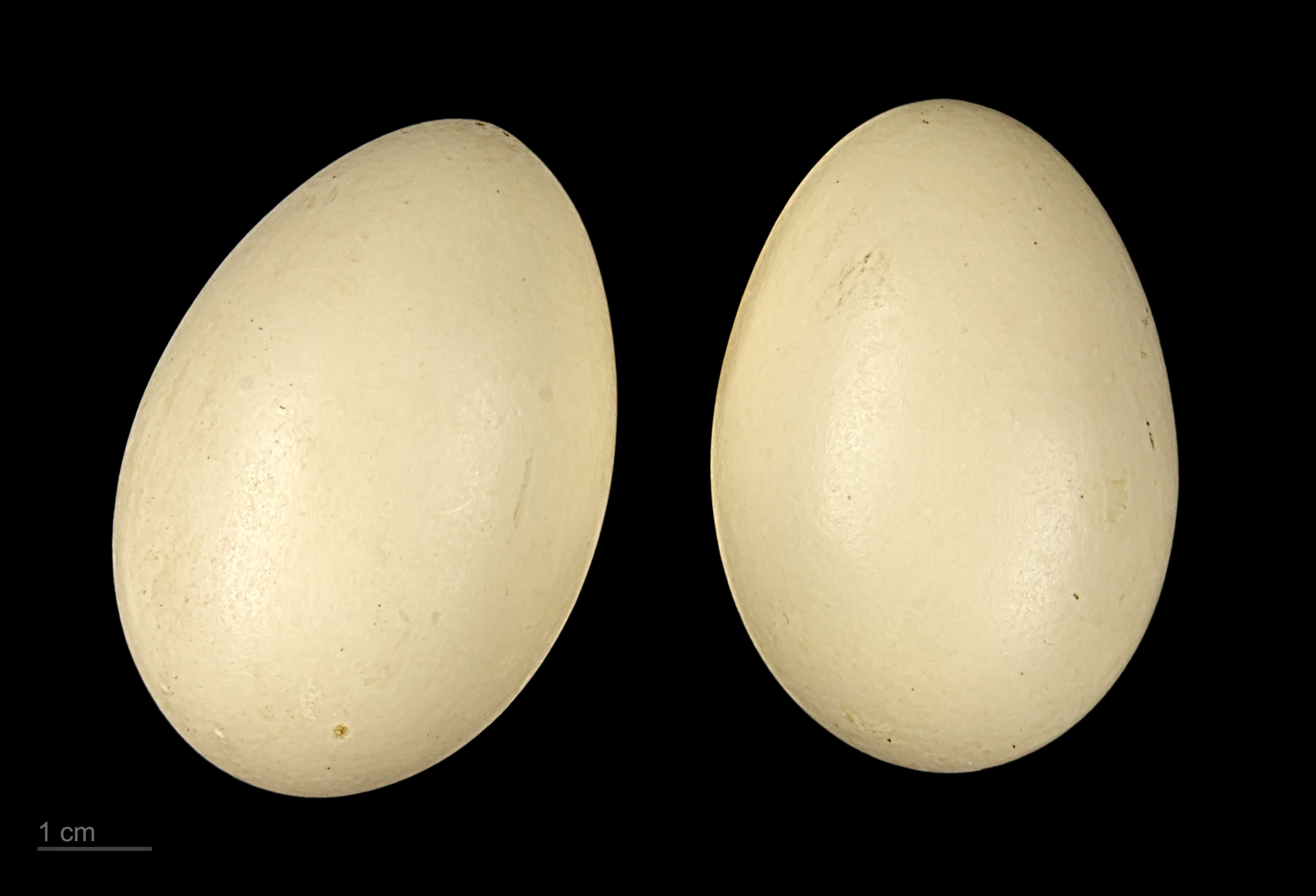
Anas puna - MHNT

The first breeding event usually occurs at one year old. The species is mostly monogamous, though some males exhibit polygyny to some extent to carry out extra-pair copulations. In the wild, they live either in single pairs, or in small groups, consisting of Puna teal alone or mixed with silver teal.

Puna teal nest on the ground in rough vegetation such as long grass, not always close to the water. They lay their eggs between April and June, and the eggs are a creamy pink color. Clutch size ranges from 5 to 8 eggs, and chicks usually weigh around 25 g at hatching. Females incubate the eggs alone for approximately 25 days, but, like swans and geese, both parents rear the ducklings. Males accompany the brood and defend the female during the fledging period. The relationship between the male and female may be long-term.

=== Migration ===
Puna teal are mainly non-migratory, sedentary birds, but they carry out altitudinal shifts outside their breeding season, descending from their breeding locations in the high Andes to lower elevations in response to decreased resource abundance. During these periods, individuals can be observed in lowlands and occasionally along the coast of Peru.

=== Vocalizations ===
The calls of Puna teal differs from those of silver teal. Its "decrescendo" call is shorter, consisting of only 4-5 weaker notes. Other reported vocalizations include a low, chatting sound ("hueer, pt pt pt..."), a mechanical, rising trill ("trrrrr" or "dr-r-r"), and a low alarm call ("whr" or "errr").

== Relationship with Humans ==
The Puna teal is one of the bird species found in Lake Titicaca, a lake on the border of Peru and Bolivia, which is utilized as a food source by the local population. A 2019 study determined that its meat has high moisture (71-76%) and protein contents (18-22%), with low levels of carbohydrates and ash (under 1%). When tested for their sensory acceptance by a panel of judges not accustomed to consuming this type of meat, their meat was not accepted, and its organoleptic qualities were rated as fair.

== Conservation ==
=== Population and Threats ===
The Puna teal is currently listed as Least Concern by the IUCN. As of 2023, the population size is estimated at 100,000 to 1,000,000 individuals, equating to approximately 66,700 to 667,000 mature individuals. Its habitat is largely undisturbed, and overall, the population is considered stable.

However, localized declines have been observed in Lake Junín in Peru. As of 2014, Puna teal numbers have decreased significantly in Lake Junín compared to estimates from previous years. This regional decline was likely linked to the loss of Chara, a preferred food for Puna teal, which is likely disappearing due to increased eutrophication, siltation, and heavy metal contamination. Additionally, some populations face pressure from hunting.
