= Huichicocha (Huancayo) =

Lake in Peru

- Location within Peru
- Location: Junín Region
- Coordinates: 12°34′30″S 75°31′32″W
- Basin countries: Peru
- Max. length: 3.16 km (1.96 mi)
- Max. width: 1.74 km (1.08 mi)
- Surface elevation: 4,653 m (15,266 ft)

Huichicocha Dam
- Location within Peru
- Country: Peru

Dam and spillways
- Height: 8 m (26 ft)

Power Station
- Operator: Electroperu

Huichicocha (possibly from Quechua wich'i a large, wide-mouthed pitcher, qucha lake, "pitcher lake", Hispanicized spelling Huichicocha and Huisquicocha where the Quechua word 'wiski' (huisqui), a borrowing from English, means whisky) is a lake in Peru located in the Junín Region, Huancayo Province, Chongos Alto District. It is situated at a height of approximately 4,653 metres (15,266 ft), about 3.16 km long and 1.74 km at its widest point. Huichicocha lies northwest of Acchicocha, southwest of Yurajcocha and east of Coyllococha.

In 1999 the Huichicocha dam was erected at the northern end of the lake at 12°33′44.7″S 75°32′0.9″W. It is 8 m (26 ft) high. It is operated by Electroperu.

== See also ==
- List of lakes in Peru
