= Huancan District =

Coordinates: 12.1081°S 75.2042°W

Huancan Wankan
- District
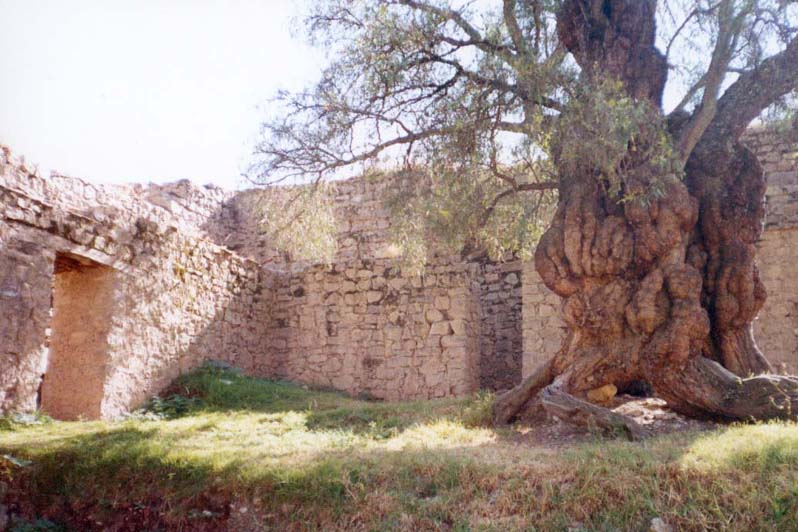
- Interactive map of Huancan
- Country: Peru
- Region: Junín
- Province: Huancayo
- Founded: October 31, 1955
- Capital: Huancan

Government
  - Mayor: Alipio Tovar Bernaola

Area
  - Total: 12 km^{2} (4.6 sq mi)
- Elevation: 3,210 m (10,530 ft)

Population (2005 census)
  - Total: 10,451
  - Density: 870/km^{2} (2,300/sq mi)
- Time zone: UTC-5 (PET)
- UBIGEO: 120119

Huancan District is one of twenty-eight districts of the province Huancayo in Peru.

== See also ==
- Wari Willka
