= Apu Inka =

Peruvian dance

Apu Inka (Quechua apu an Andean deity, Inka Inca) is a folk dance in Peru. The dance re-enacts the capture of the Inca by the Spanish invaders. The representation of Apu Inka is mostly associated with the feast in honor of the Virgen de Navidad or Virgen de Cocharcas, which is held annually in September in the Sapallanga District of the Huancayo Province in the Junín Region, but it is also performed in other regions of Peru.
