= Quichuay District =

Quichuay
- District
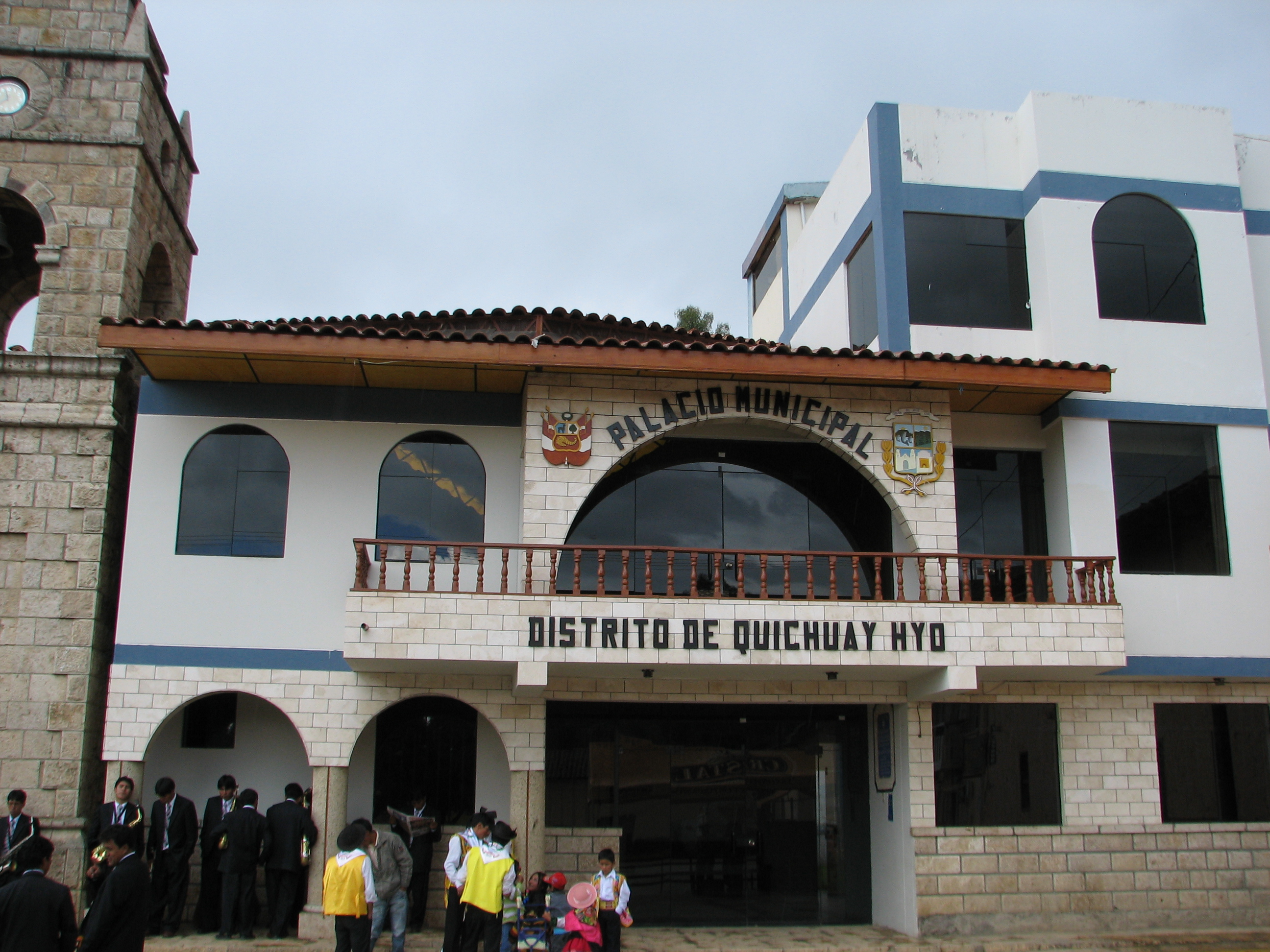
- Town hall

- Location within Peru
- Coordinates: 11.89°S 75.29°W
- Country: Peru
- Region: Junín
- Province: Huancayo
- Founded: November 24, 1955
- Capital: Quichuay

Government
  - Mayor: Gonzalo Alfonso Parraga Camarena

Area
  - Total: 34.79 km^{2} (13.43 sq mi)
- Elevation: 3,430 m (11,250 ft)

Population (2005 census)
  - Total: 2,186
  - Density: 62.83/km^{2} (162.7/sq mi)
- Time zone: UTC-5 (PET)
- UBIGEO: 120127

Quichuay District is one of twenty-eight districts of the province Huancayo in Peru.
