= San Agustín de Cajas District =

Coordinates: 11.9738°S 75.2534°W

San Agustín
- District
- Interactive map of San Agustín
- Country: Peru
- Region: Junín
- Province: Huancayo
- Founded: March 20, 1940
- Capital: San Agustín

Government
  - Mayor: Teofilo Constantino Baldeon Rojas

Area
  - Total: 23.09 km^{2} (8.92 sq mi)
- Elevation: 3,250 m (10,660 ft)

Population (2005 census)
  - Total: 9,337
  - Density: 404.4/km^{2} (1,047/sq mi)
- Time zone: UTC-5 (PET)
- UBIGEO: 120129

San Agustín District is one of twenty-eight districts of the province Huancayo in Peru.
