= Carhuacallanga District =

Coordinates: 12.3667°S 75.2167°W

Carhuacallanga Qarwa Kallanka
- District
- Interactive map of Carhuacallanga
- Country: Peru
- Region: Junín
- Province: Huancayo
- Founded: January 16, 1941
- Capital: Carhuacallanga

Government
  - Mayor: Remigio Severo Eulogio Morales

Area
  - Total: 13.78 km^{2} (5.32 sq mi)
- Elevation: 3,770 m (12,370 ft)

Population (2005 census)
  - Total: 505
  - Density: 36.6/km^{2} (94.9/sq mi)
- Time zone: UTC-5 (PET)
- UBIGEO: 120104

Carhuacallanga District is one of twenty-eight districts of the province Huancayo in Peru.
