= Chacapampa District =

Chacapampa Chakapampa
- District
- Interactive map of Chacapampa
- Country: Peru
- Region: Junín
- Province: Huancayo
- Founded: April 15, 1959
- Capital: Chacapampa

Government
  - Mayor: Nazario Ricardo Borja Castro

Area
  - Total: 120.72 km^{2} (46.61 sq mi)
- Elevation: 3,420 m (11,220 ft)

Population (2005 census)
  - Total: 1,391
  - Density: 11.52/km^{2} (29.84/sq mi)
- Time zone: UTC-5 (PET)
- UBIGEO: 120105

Chacapampa or Chakapampa (Aymara and Quechua chaka bridge, pampa plain, "bridge plain") is one of twenty-eight districts of the province Huancayo in Peru.
