= Wari Willka =

Archaeological site in Peru

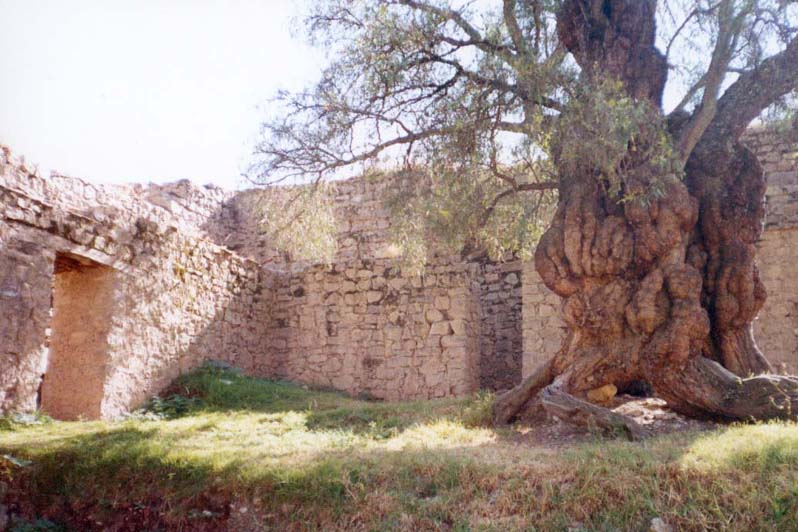
- Interactive map of Wari Willka
- 12°07′03″S 75°12′22″W
- Location: Huancan District, Huancayo Province, Junín Region, Peru
- Region: Andes

Wari Willka, also Wariwillka (Hispanicized spellings Huarihuilca, Huariwilka, Huarivilca, Huarivillca, Huariwillka, Warivilca, Wariwillca, Wariwilka, Wari Willca), is an archaeological site in Peru. It is located in the Junín Region, Huancayo Province, Huancan District.

== Gallery ==
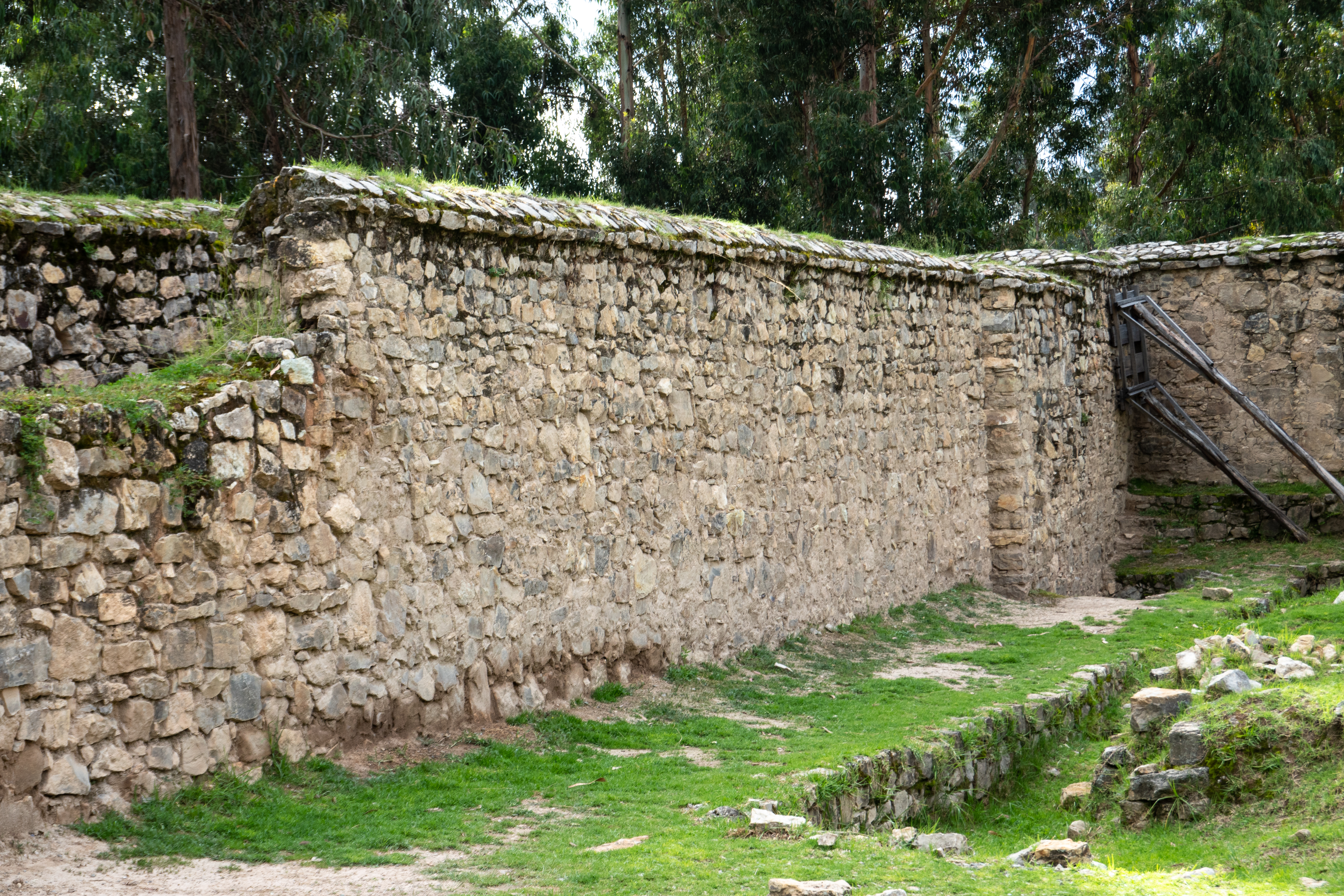

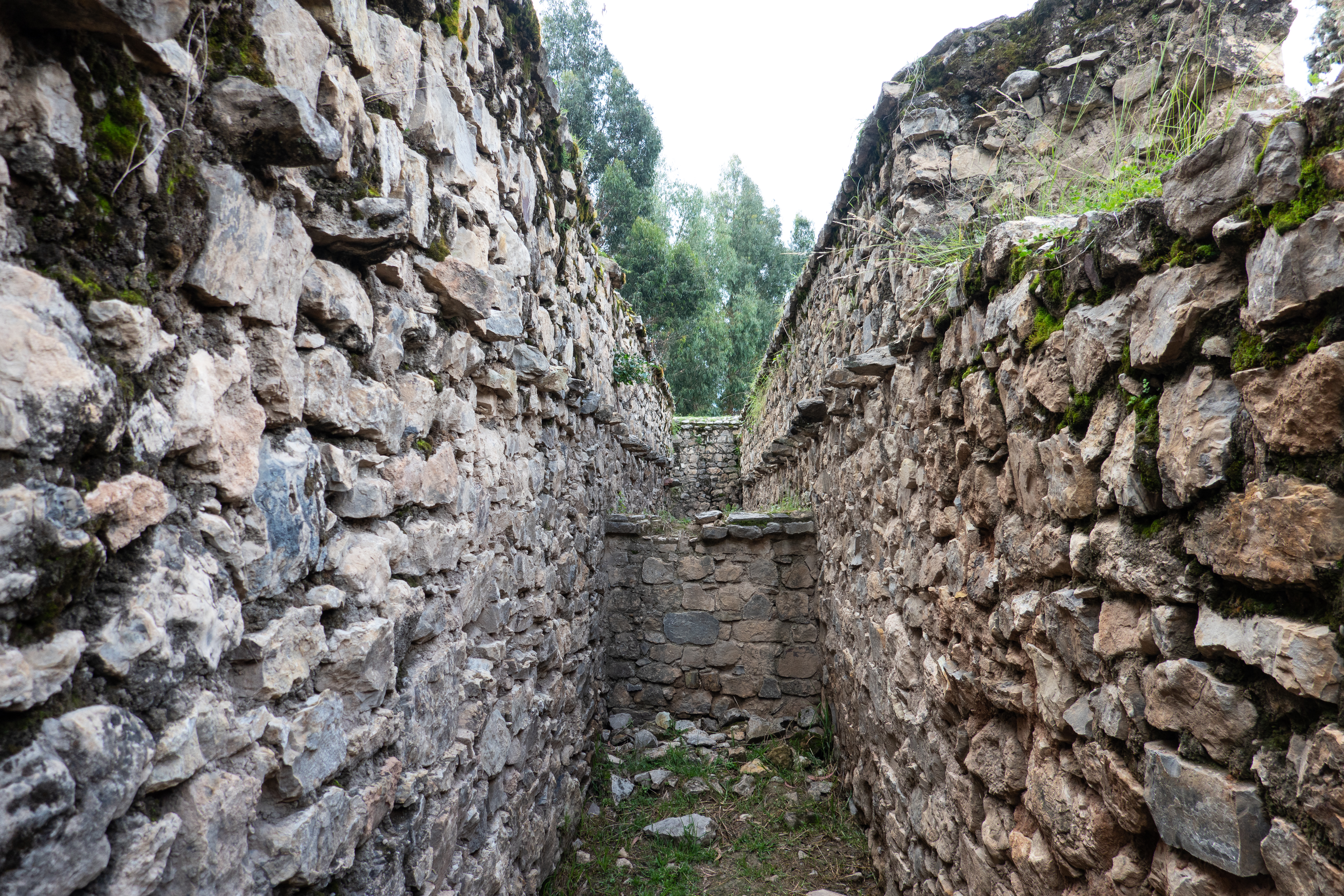

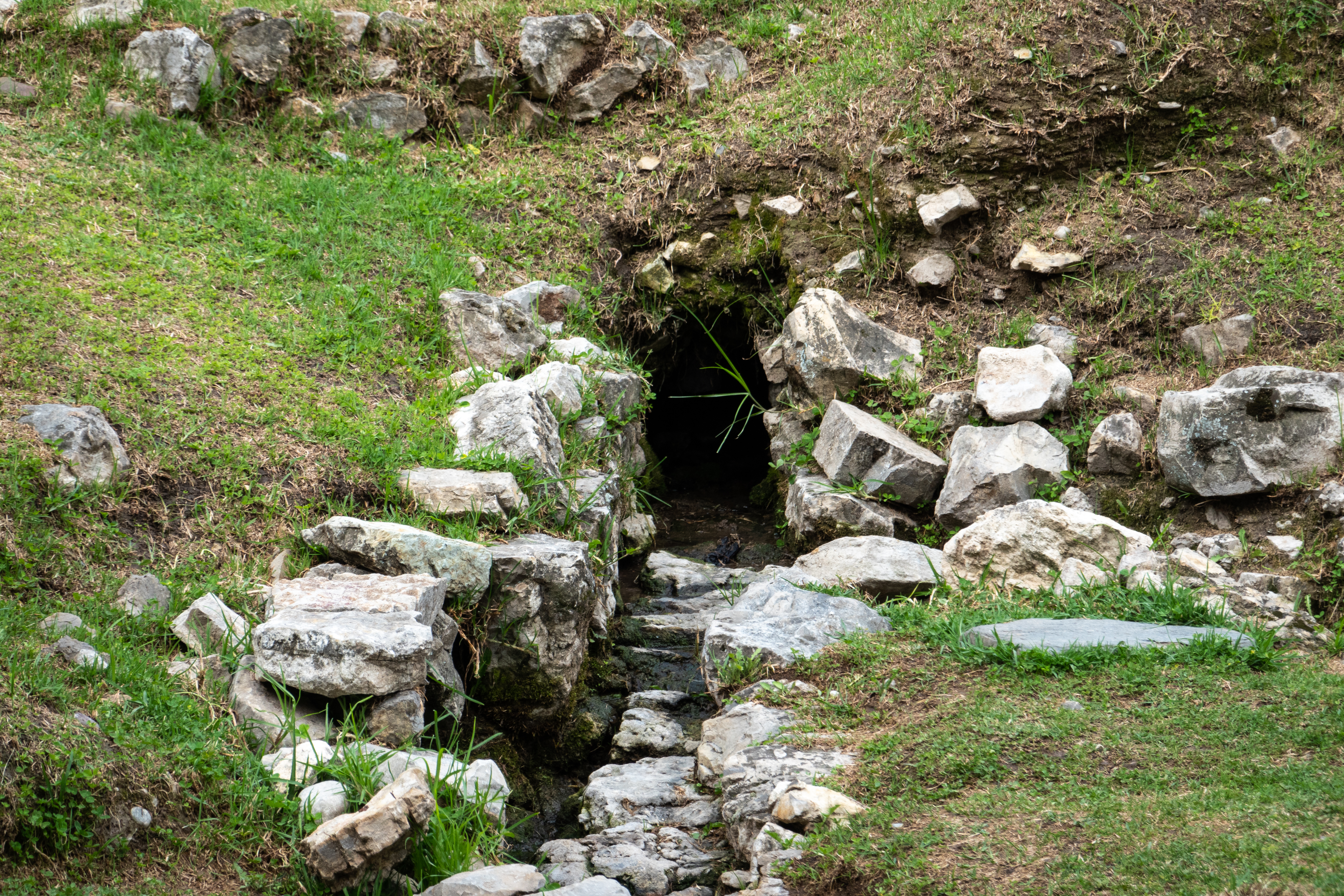

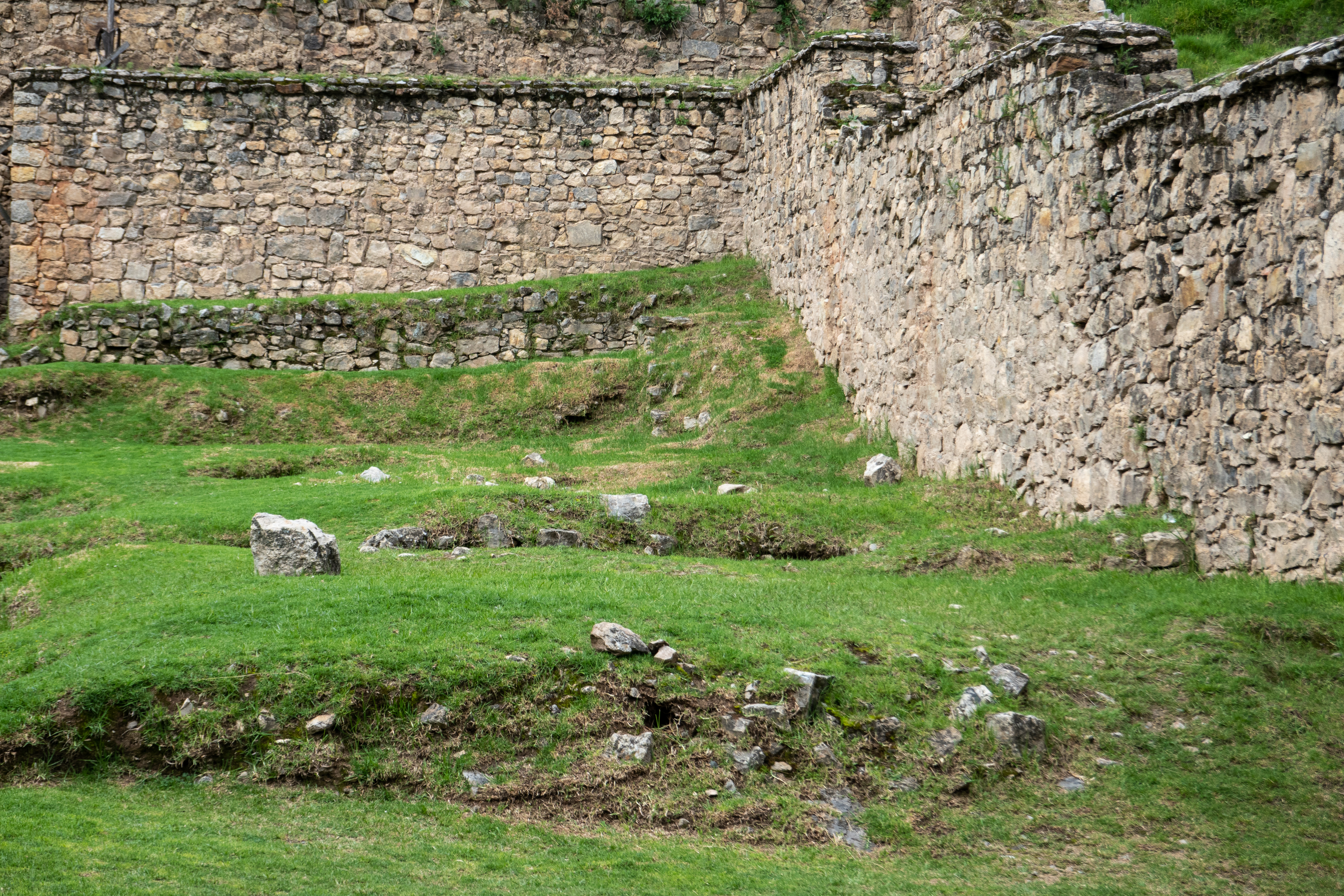

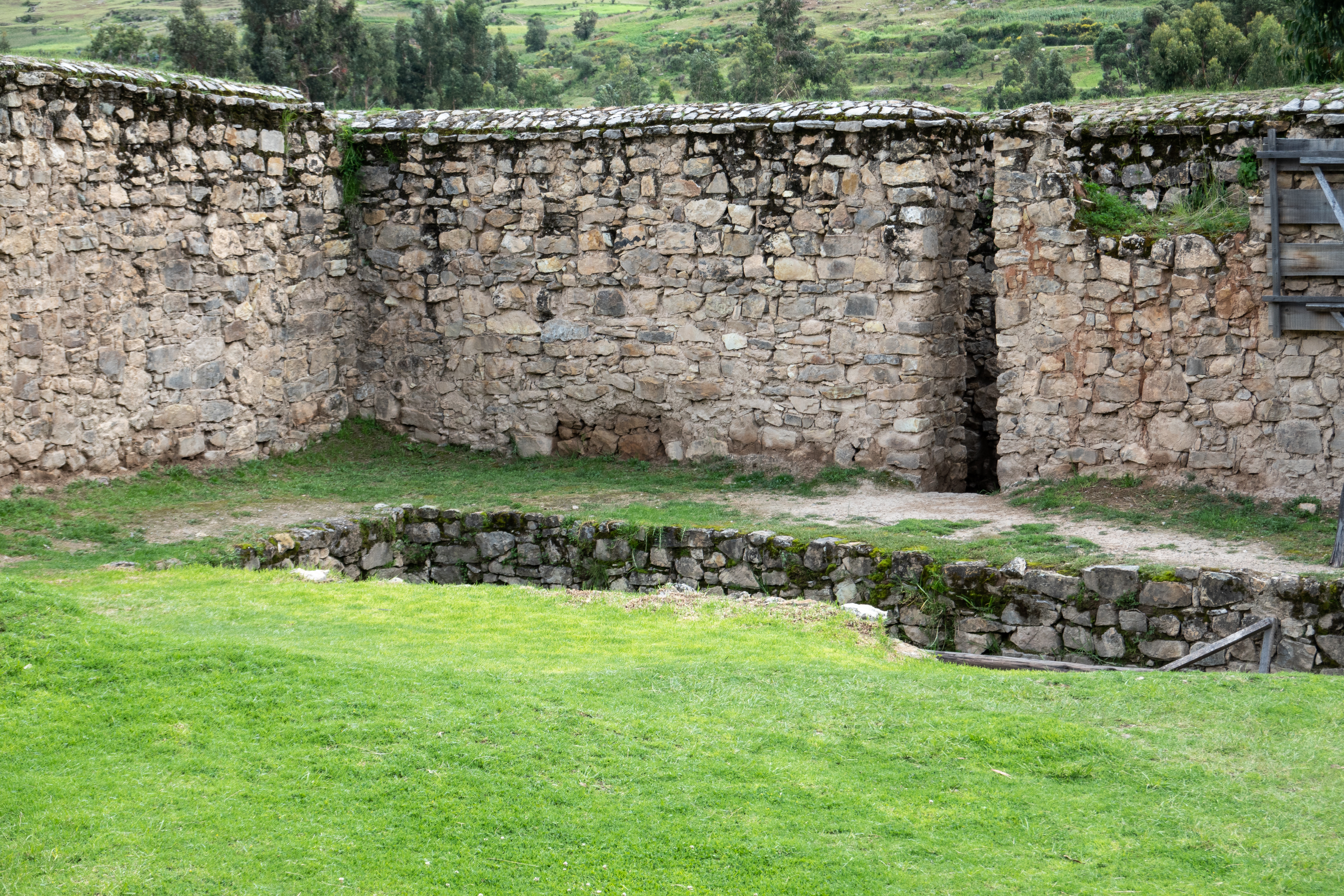

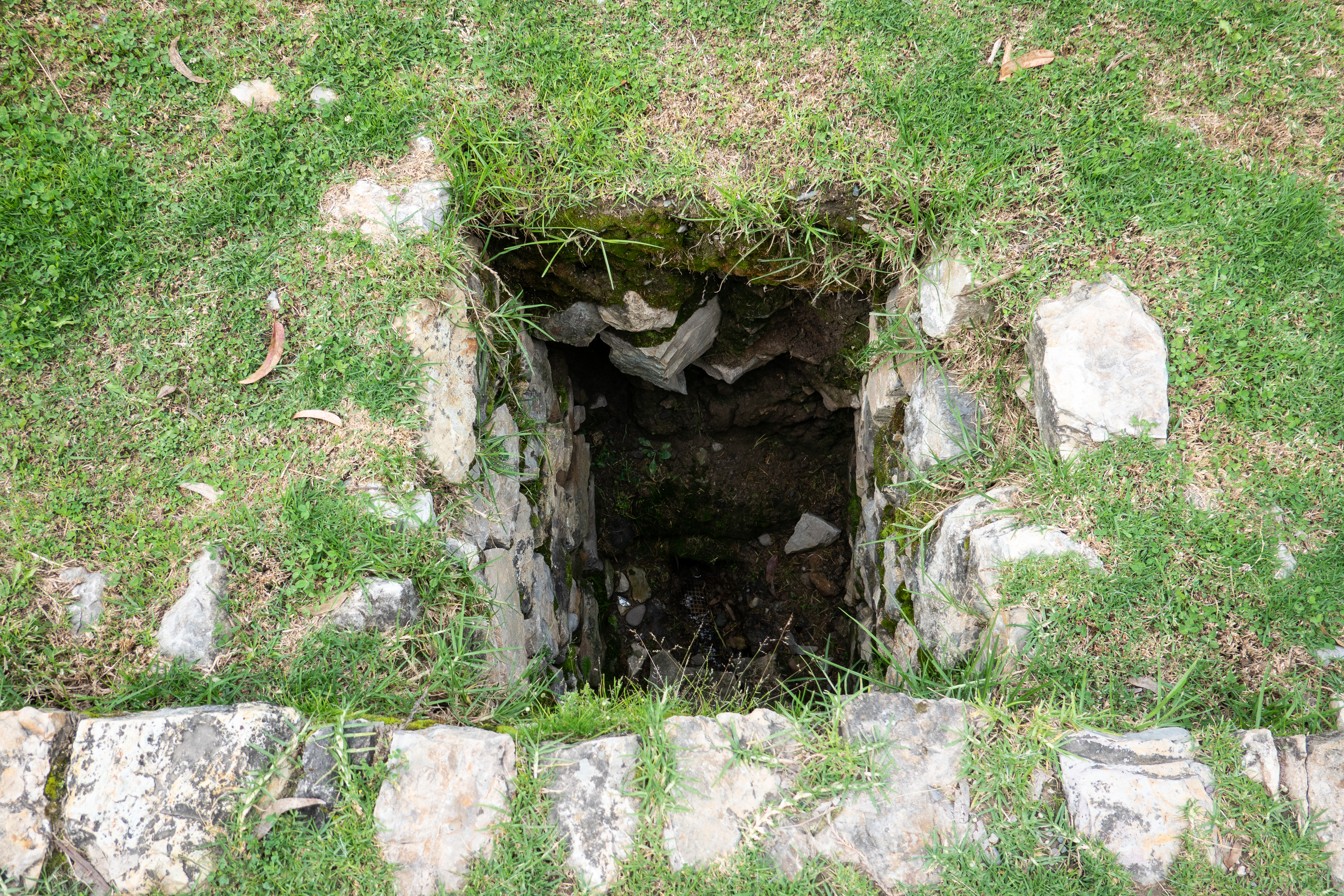

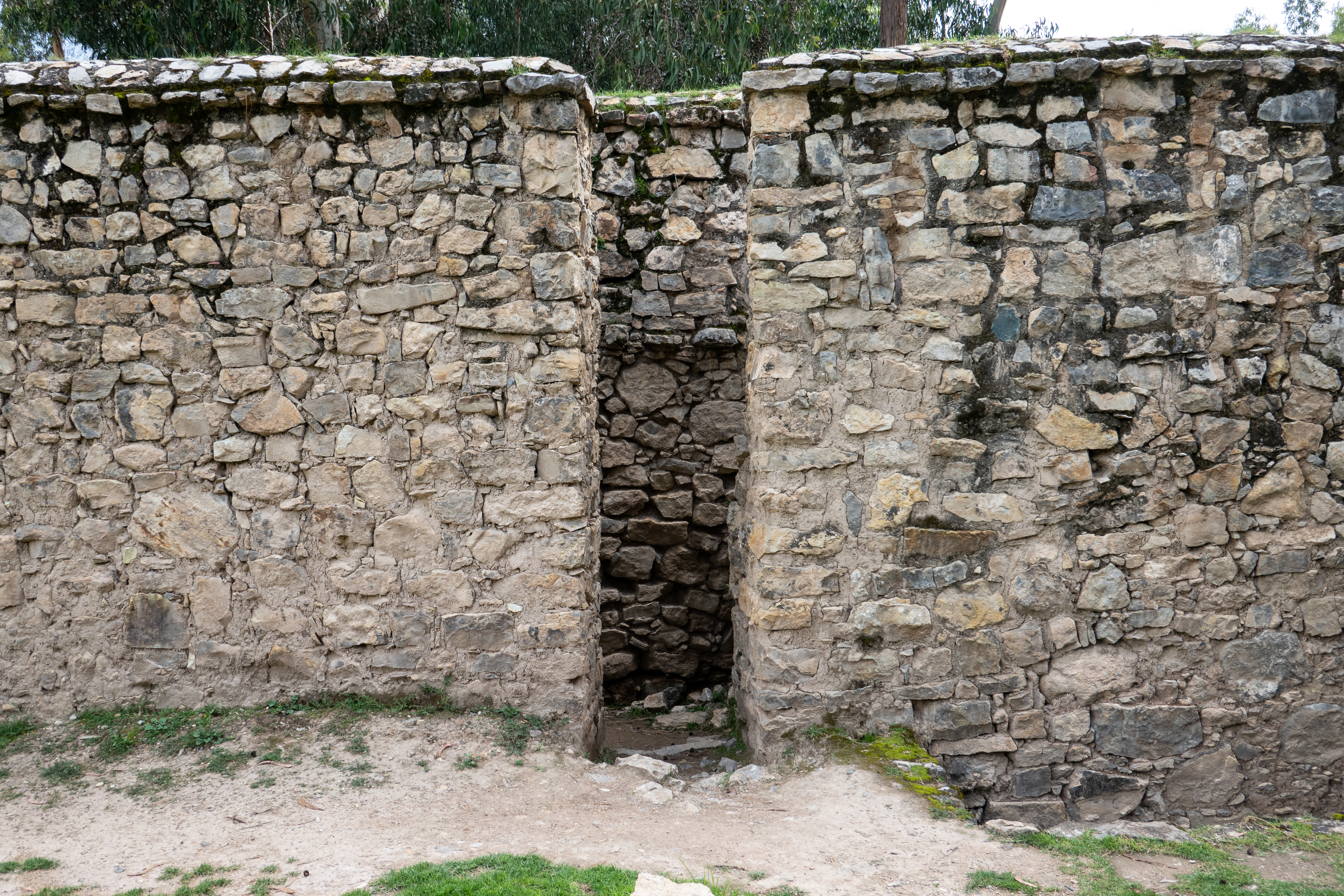
