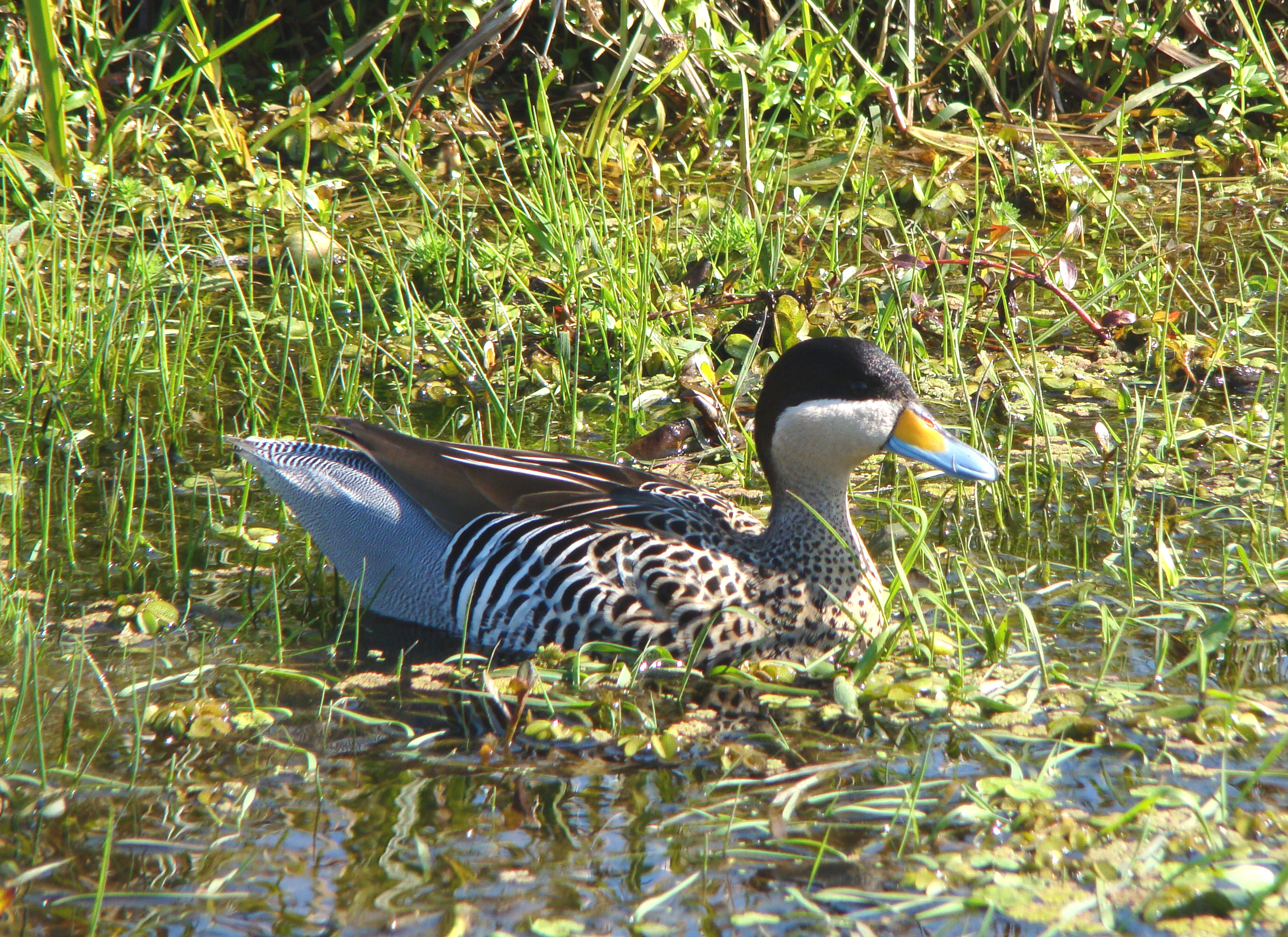
- A male in Brazil

Conservation status
- Least Concern (IUCN 3.1)

Scientific classification
- Kingdom: Animalia
- Phylum: Chordata
- Class: Aves
- Order: Anseriformes
- Family: Anatidae
- Genus: Spatula
- Species: S. versicolor

Binomial name
- Spatula versicolor (Vieillot, 1816)

Subspecies
- S. v. versicolor (Vieillot, 1816) (northern silver teal); S. v. fretensis (King, 1831)) (southern silver teal)
- Non-Breeding Year-round Breeding

Synonyms
- Anas versicolor Vieillot, 1816

= Silver teal =

Species of bird

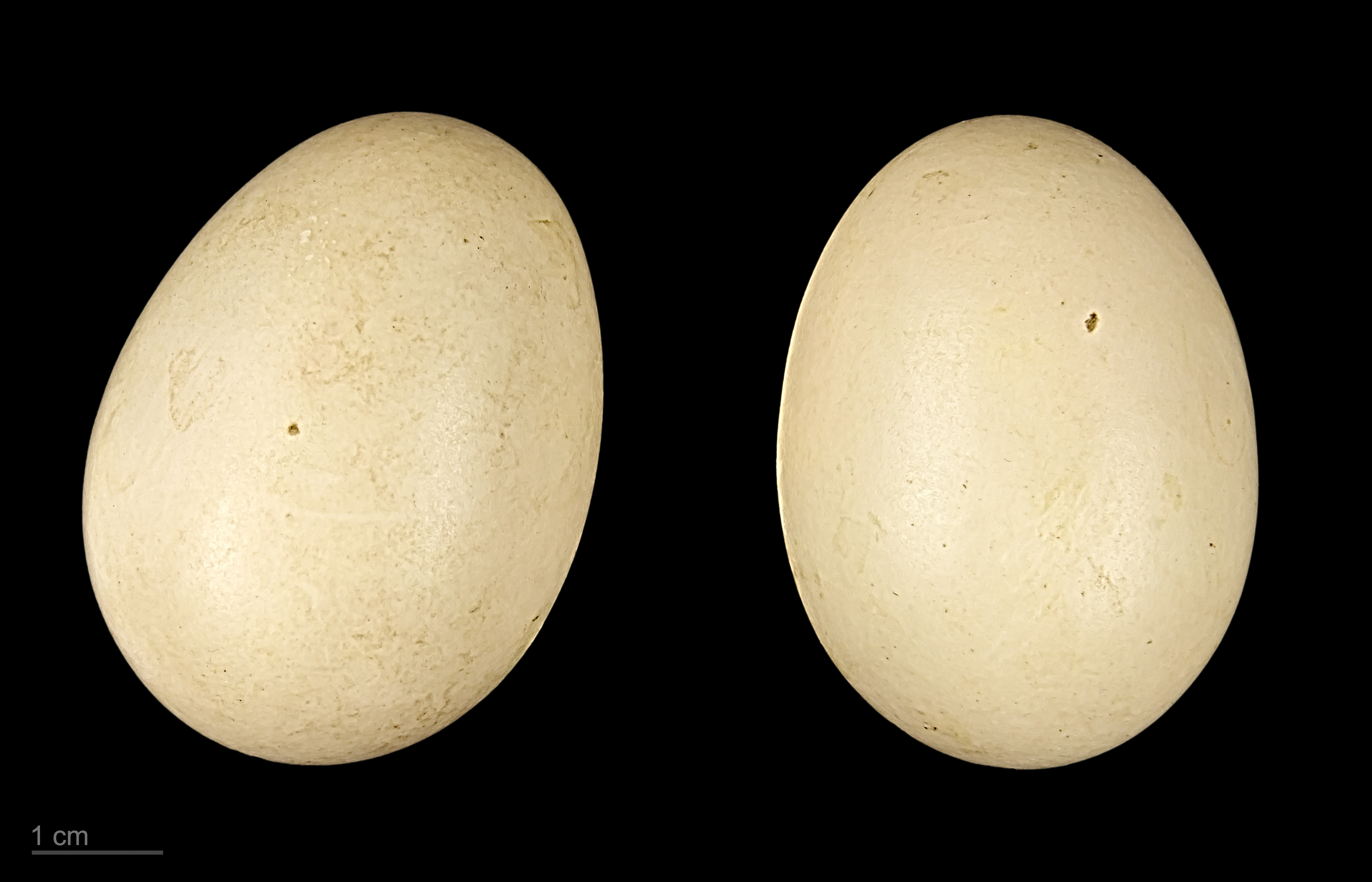
Anas versicolor - MHNT

The silver teal or versicolor teal (Spatula versicolor) is a species of dabbling duck in the genus Spatula. It breeds in South America.

Between April and June they prefer reed beds and will lay 6 to 10 creamy-pink eggs. The eggs will hatch after 25 to 27 days. As with swans and geese, both parents will rear the ducklings. A pair may bond long term. It lives on fresh water in small groups, and feeds primarily on vegetable matter such as seeds and aquatic plants.

The silver teal's range includes southern Bolivia, southern Brazil, Paraguay, Argentina, Chile, Uruguay, South Georgia, South Sandwich Islands, and the Falkland Islands. The southernmost birds migrate to southern Brazil in the winter.

Silver teals are on the whole placid ducks but may be protective of eggs, young and females.

== Description ==
They have a black cap that extends below the eyes, and a bluish bill with a yellow tip. They also have a green speculum with a white border. The female's plumage is slightly duller and has less yellow at the base of the beak.

The Puna teal was previously regarded as a subspecies of this bird. Currently, there are two subspecies:

- S. versicolor versicolor northern silver teal located in Paraguay, southern Bolivia, and southern Brazil.
- S. versicolor fretensis southern silver teal located in southern Chile, Argentina, and the Falkland Islands.

== Sources ==
- Clements, James, (2007) The Clements Checklist of the Birds of the World, Cornell University Press, Ithaca
- "Dabbling Ducks". Connecticut Waterfowl Trust. April 2, 2003 (Retrieved October 31, 2006).
