= Hualhuas District =

Coordinates: 11.9611°S 75.2563°W

Hualhuas
- District
- Coat of arms

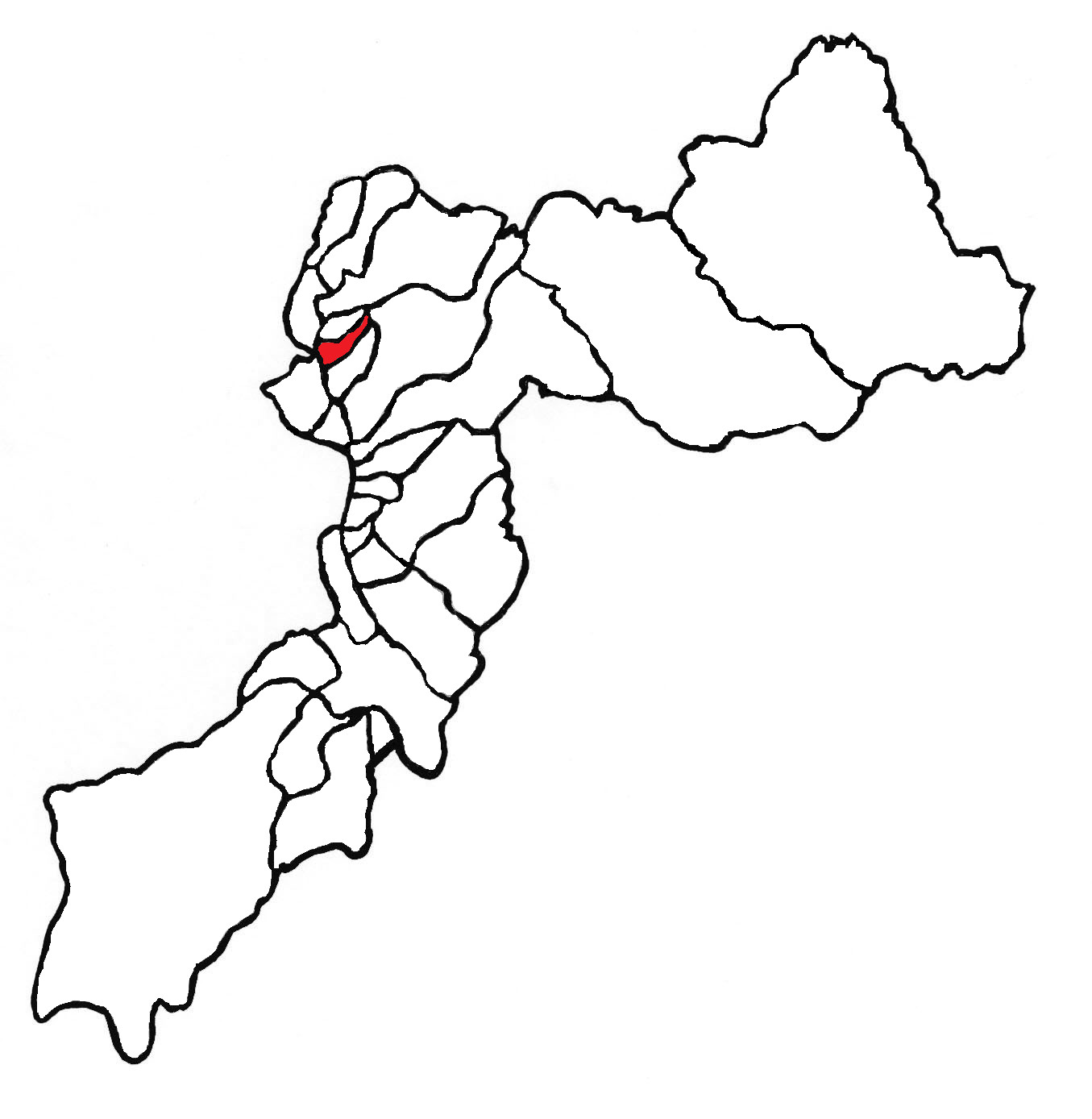
- Location of Hualhuas in the Huancayo province
- Country: Peru
- Region: Junín
- Province: Huancayo
- Founded: December 13, 1941
- Capital: Hualhuas

Government
  - Mayor: Emilio Torres Ramos

Area
  - Total: 24.82 km^{2} (9.58 sq mi)
- Elevation: 3,280 m (10,760 ft)

Population (2005 census)
  - Total: 3,546
  - Density: 142.9/km^{2} (370.0/sq mi)
- Time zone: UTC-5 (PET)
- UBIGEO: 120117

Hualhuas District is one of twenty-eight districts of the province Huancayo in Peru. It is located approximately 7 kilometers north of Huancayo and is heavily native.

According to José María Arguedas in 1975, all of the town of Hualhuas was dedicated to the textile weaving of rugs and tapestries, be it "casually or professionally". This business is sold to customers in urban areas and tourists.

As of 2016, it was ruled by a mayor and five regidores.
