= San Pedro de Saño District =

San Pedro de Saño
- District
- Location within Peru
- Country: Peru
- Region: Junín
- Province: Huancayo
- Founded: October 5, 1854
- Capital: Saño

Government
  - Mayor: Hilton Histon Avila Avila

Area
  - Total: 11.59 km^{2} (4.47 sq mi)
- Elevation: 3,286 m (10,781 ft)

Population (2005 census)
  - Total: 4,100
  - Density: 350/km^{2} (920/sq mi)
- Time zone: UTC-5 (PET)
- UBIGEO: 120132

San Pedro de Saño District is one of twenty-eight districts of the province Huancayo in Peru.
