= Ñawinqucha (Junín) =

- Location within Peru
- Location: Peru; Junín Region
- Coordinates: 12°36′03″S 75°26′40″W
- Max. length: 2.25 km (1.40 mi)
- Max. width: 0.64 km (0.40 mi)
- Surface elevation: 4,592 m (15,066 ft)

Ñawinqucha Dam
- Location within Peru
- Country: Peru

Dam and spillways
- Height: 5.9 m (19 ft)

Power Station
- Operator: Electroperu

Ñawinqucha (Quechua ñawi eye; button hole, -n a suffix, qucha lake, hispanicized spelling Ñahuincocha) is a lake in Peru located in the Junín Region, Huancayo Province, Chongos Alto District. It is situated at a height of approximately 4,592 metres (15,066 ft), about 2.25 km long and 0.64 km at its widest point. Ñawinqucha lies southeast of Yuraqqucha and northeast of Aqchiqucha. It belongs to the watershed of the Mantaro River.

In 1999 the Ñawinqucha dam was erected at the northeastern end of the lake at 12°35′32″S 75°26′7.5″W. It is 5.9 m (19 ft) high. It is operated by Electroperu.
