= Viques District =

Coordinates: 12.1622°S 75.2292°W

Viques
- District
- Interactive map of Viques
- Country: Peru
- Region: Junín
- Province: Huancayo
- Founded: December 24, 1941
- Capital: Viques

Government
  - Mayor: Emerson Nolasco Delgado

Area
  - Total: 3.57 km^{2} (1.38 sq mi)
- Elevation: 3,195 m (10,482 ft)

Population (2005 census)
  - Total: 1,465
  - Density: 410/km^{2} (1,060/sq mi)
- Time zone: UTC-5 (PET)
- UBIGEO: 120136

Viques District is one of twenty-eight districts of the province Huancayo in Peru.

== Climate ==
Climate data for Viques, elevation 3,186 m (10,453 ft), (1991–2020)
Month	Jan	Feb	Mar	Apr	May	Jun	Jul	Aug	Sep	Oct	Nov	Dec	Year
Mean daily maximum °C (°F)	20.1 (68.2)	19.8 (67.6)	19.6 (67.3)	20.5 (68.9)	21.3 (70.3)	20.9 (69.6)	20.7 (69.3)	21.2 (70.2)	21.0 (69.8)	21.0 (69.8)	21.7 (71.1)	20.2 (68.4)	20.7 (69.2)
Mean daily minimum °C (°F)	7.9 (46.2)	8.1 (46.6)	7.8 (46.0)	6.1 (43.0)	4.0 (39.2)	2.6 (36.7)	2.1 (35.8)	3.3 (37.9)	5.9 (42.6)	6.8 (44.2)	7.0 (44.6)	7.8 (46.0)	5.8 (42.4)
Average precipitation mm (inches)	118.5 (4.67)	130.6 (5.14)	95.9 (3.78)	35.3 (1.39)	12.3 (0.48)	5.8 (0.23)	9.0 (0.35)	9.0 (0.35)	34.7 (1.37)	57.9 (2.28)	56.7 (2.23)	92.5 (3.64)	658.2 (25.91)
Source: National Meteorology and Hydrology Service of Peru
