= Kapillayuq =

Mountain in Peru

- Location within Peru

Highest point
- Elevation: 5,129 m (16,827 ft)
- Coordinates: 12°36′30″S 75°27′26″W

Geography
- Location: Peru, Junín Region
- Parent range: Andes

Kapillayuq (Quechua kapilla chapel (a borrowing from Spanish capilla), -yuq a suffix to indicate ownership, "the one with a chapel", also spelled Capillayoc) is a 5,129-metre-high (16,827 ft) mountain in the Andes of Peru. It is located in the Junín Region, Huancayo Province, Chongos Alto District. Kapillayuq lies east of Walsa and west of the lake named Ñawinqucha.
