= Inti Wañunan =

Mountain in Peru

- Location within Peru

Highest point
- Elevation: 4,600 m (15,100 ft)
- Coordinates: 12°32′02″S 75°20′51″W

Geography
- Location: Peru, Huancavelica Region, Junín Region
- Parent range: Andes

Inti Wañunan (Quechua inti sun, wañuy to die, -na a suffix, "where the sun dies", -n a suffix, Hispanicized spelling Intihuañunan) is a mountain in the Andes of Peru, about 4,600 m (15,092 ft) high. It is situated in the Huancavelica Region, Huancavelica Province, Acobambilla District, and in the Junín Region, Huancayo Province, Chongos Alto District.
