= Ingenio District =

Coordinates: 11.8904°S 75.2672°W

Ingenio
- District
- Interactive map of Ingenio
- Country: Peru
- Region: Junín
- Province: Huancayo
- Founded: June 10, 1955
- Capital: Ingenio

Government
  - Mayor: Walter Meza Vargas

Area
  - Total: 53.29 km^{2} (20.58 sq mi)
- Elevation: 3,460 m (11,350 ft)

Population (2005 census)
  - Total: 2,807
  - Density: 52.67/km^{2} (136.4/sq mi)
- Time zone: UTC-5 (PET)
- UBIGEO: 120122

Ingenio District is one of twenty-eight districts of the province Huancayo in Peru.
