= Huacrapuquio District =

Huacrapuquio Waqrapukyu
- District
- Interactive map of Huacrapuquio
- Country: Peru
- Region: Junín
- Province: Huancayo
- Founded: March 20, 1940
- Capital: Huacrapuquio

Government
  - Mayor: Rogelio Lara Huaman

Area
  - Total: 24.1 km^{2} (9.3 sq mi)
- Elevation: 3,247 m (10,653 ft)

Population (2005 census)
  - Total: 1,589
  - Density: 65.9/km^{2} (171/sq mi)
- Time zone: UTC-5 (PET)
- UBIGEO: 120116

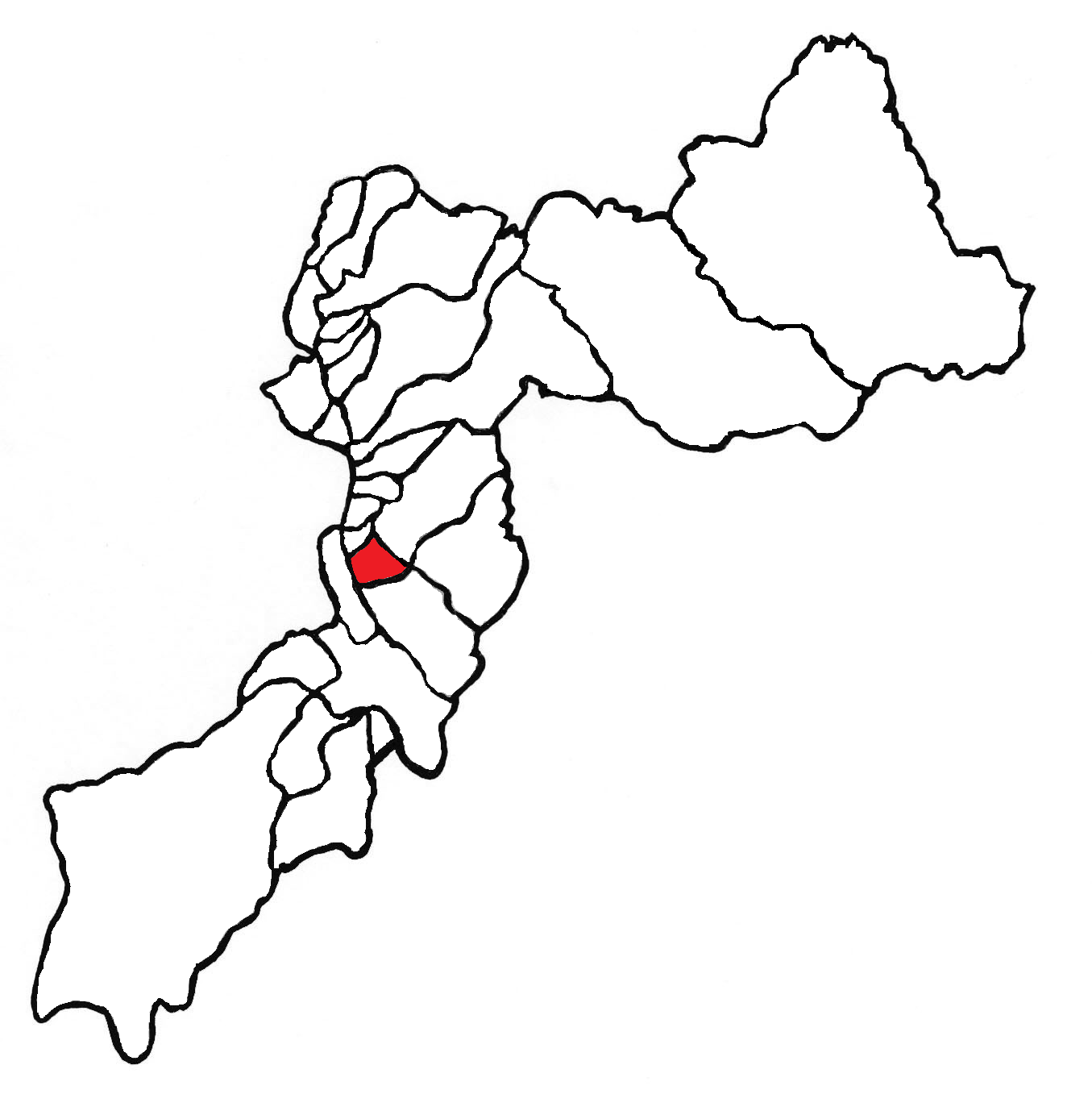
Location of the district in the province of Huancayo, department of Junín, Peru

Huacrapuquio District is one of twenty-eight districts of the province Huancayo in Peru.
