= Chupuro District =

Coordinates: 12.1566°S 75.2457°W

Chupuro
- District
- Interactive map of Chupuro
- Country: Peru
- Region: Junín
- Province: Huancayo
- Founded: October 14, 1960
- Capital: Chupuro

Government
  - Mayor: Ovidio Libron Nestares Valentin

Area
  - Total: 13.15 km^{2} (5.08 sq mi)
- Elevation: 3,175 m (10,417 ft)

Population (2005 census)
  - Total: 2,494
  - Density: 189.7/km^{2} (491.2/sq mi)
- Time zone: UTC-5 (PET)
- UBIGEO: 120111

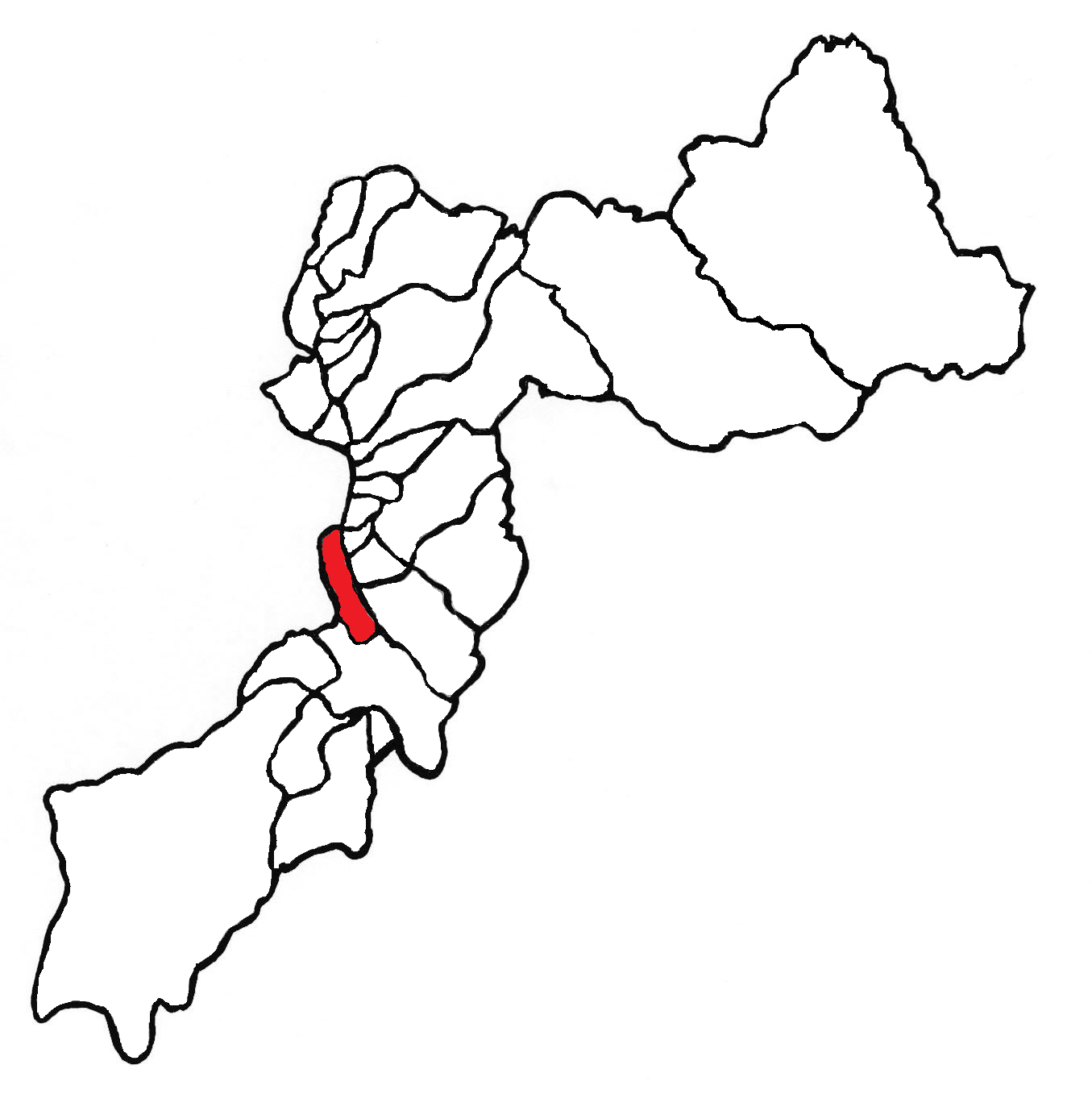
Location of the Chupuro district

Chupuro District is one of twenty-eight districts of the province Huancayo in Peru.
