= Waqra Willka =

Mountain in Peru

- Location within Peru

Highest point
- Elevation: 5,066 m (16,621 ft)
- Coordinates: 12°28′33″S 75°24′06″W

Geography
- Location: Peru, Junín Region
- Parent range: Andes

Waqra Willka (Quechua waqra horn, willka grandchild; great-grandson; lineage; minor god in the Inca culture, an image of the Willkanuta valley worshipped as God; holy, sacred, divine, willka or wilka Anadenanthera colubrina (a tree), Hispanicized spelling Huacravilca) is a 5,066-metre-high (16,621 ft) mountain in the Andes of Peru. It is located in the Junín Region, Huancayo Province, Chongos Alto District. Waqra Willka lies east of Wira Challwa. A couple of small lakes named Yuraqqucha ("white lake"), Anqasqucha ("blue lake"), Challwaqucha ("fish lake") and Antaqucha ("copper lake") are situated at the feet of the mountain.
