= Sapallanga District =

Coordinates: 12.1484°S 75.1588°W

Sapallanga
- District
- Interactive map of Sapallanga
- Country: Peru
- Region: Junín
- Province: Huancayo
- Founded: January 2, 1857
- Capital: Sapallanga

Government
  - Mayor: Gonzalo Ramces Fano Miranda

Area
  - Total: 119.02 km^{2} (45.95 sq mi)
- Elevation: 3,285 m (10,778 ft)

Population (2005 census)
  - Total: 13,878
  - Density: 116.60/km^{2} (302.00/sq mi)
- Time zone: UTC-5 (PET)
- UBIGEO: 120133

Sapallanga District is one of twenty-eight districts of the province Huancayo in Peru.

== See also ==
- Apu Inka
