= Huayucachi District =

Coordinates: 12.1338°S 75.2268°W

Huayucachi Wayukachi
- District
- Interactive map of Huayucachi
- Country: Peru
- Region: Junín
- Province: Huancayo
- Founded: November 10, 1857
- Capital: Huayucachi

Area
  - Total: 13.13 km^{2} (5.07 sq mi)
- Elevation: 3,201 m (10,502 ft)

Population (2005 census)
  - Total: 8,503
  - Density: 647.6/km^{2} (1,677/sq mi)
- Time zone: UTC-5 (PET)
- UBIGEO: 120121

Huayucachi District is one of twenty-eight districts of the province Huancayo in Peru.
