= Colca District, Huancayo =

Coordinates: 12.3141°S 75.2282°W

Colca Qullqa
- District
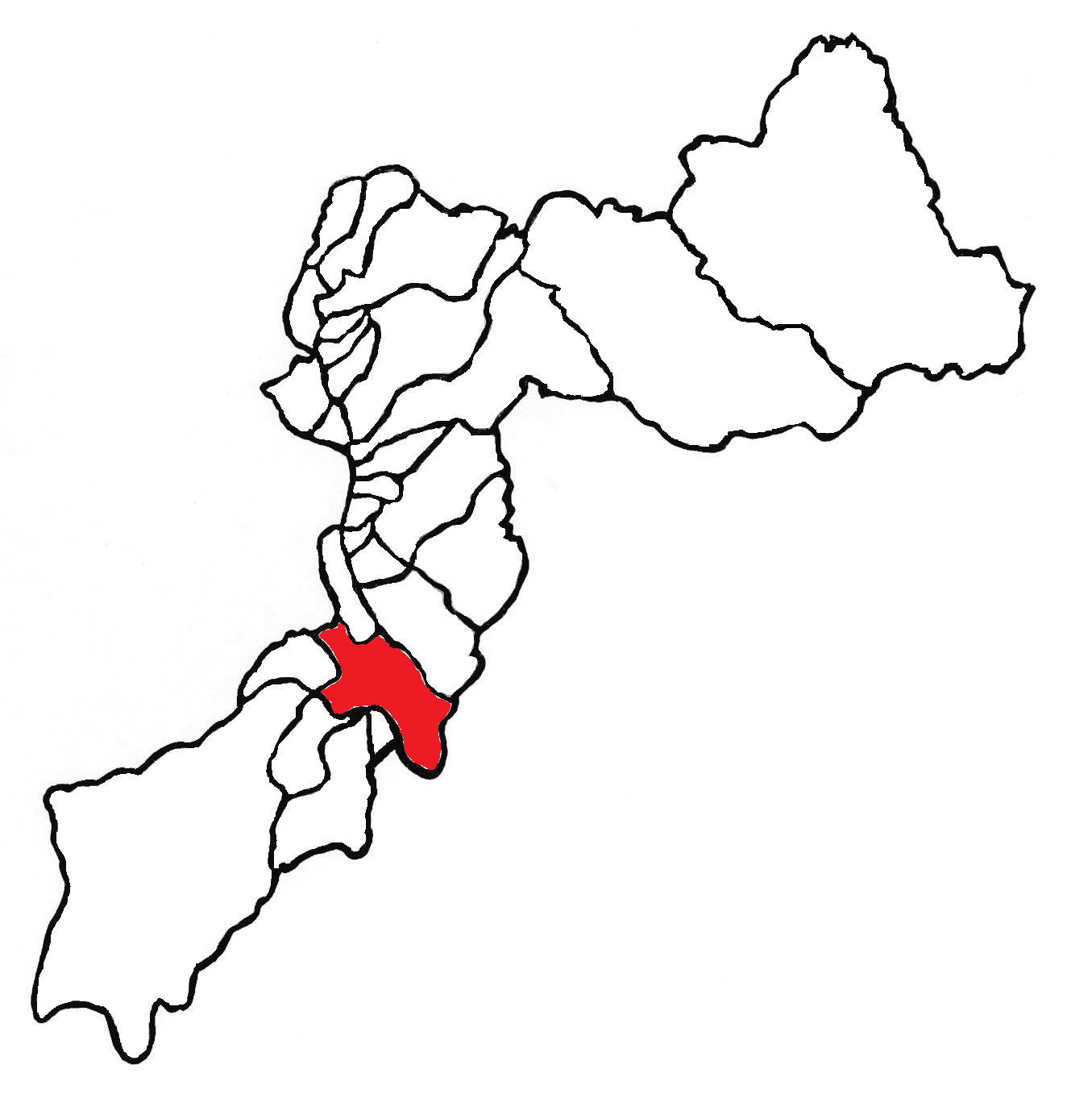
- Interactive map of Colca
- Country: Peru
- Region: Junín
- Province: Huancayo
- Founded: January 02, 1857
- Capital: Colca

Government
  - Mayor: Percy Rivelino Perez Rios

Area
  - Total: 113.06 km^{2} (43.65 sq mi)
- Elevation: 3,516 m (11,535 ft)

Population (2005 census)
  - Total: 1,685
  - Density: 14.90/km^{2} (38.60/sq mi)
- Time zone: UTC-5 (PET)
- UBIGEO: 120112

Colca District is one of twenty-eight districts of the province Huancayo in Peru.
