= Coyllococha =

Dam in Junín Region, Peru

Coyllococha Dam
- Location within Peru
- Country: Peru
- Location: Junín Region
- Coordinates: 12°35′23″S 75°33′14″W

Dam and spillways
- Height: 5.5 m (18 ft)

Reservoir
- Creates: Coyllococha
- Maximum length: 4.15 km (2.58 mi)
- Maximum width: 1.45 km (0.90 mi)
- Normal elevation: 4,683 m (15,364 ft)

Power Station
- Operator: Electroperu

Coyllococha (possibly from Quechua quyllu impeccable white; generic name for a kind of potatoes, qucha lake,) is a lake in Peru located in the Junín Region, Huancayo Province, Chongos Alto District. It is situated at a height of approximately 4,683 metres (15,364 ft), about 4.15 km long and 1.45 km at its widest point. Coyllococha lies southwest of Yurajcocha and Huichicocha. It belongs to the watershed of the Mantaro River.

The lake is sometimes also named Coyllorcocha (possibly from Quechua quyllur star, "star lake"). This name correlates with the name of mountain at the western end of the lake whose name is Coyllor (Quyllur).

In 1999 the Coyllorcocha dam was erected at the northeastern end of the lake at 12°34′49.6″S 75°32′22.6″W. It is 5.5 m (18 ft) high. It is operated by Electroperu.
