= Chongos Alto District =

Coordinates: 12.3113°S 75.2888°W

Chongos Alto
- District
- Interactive map of Chongos Alto
- Country: Peru
- Region: Junín
- Province: Huancayo
- Founded: November 11, 1907
- Capital: Chongos Alto

Government
  - Mayor: Evaristo Siuce Vilcapoma

Area
  - Total: 701.75 km^{2} (270.95 sq mi)
- Elevation: 3,544 m (11,627 ft)

Population (2005 census)
  - Total: 1,819
  - Density: 2.592/km^{2} (6.713/sq mi)
- Time zone: UTC-5 (PET)
- UBIGEO: 120108

Chongos Alto District is one of twenty-eight districts of the province Huancayo in Peru. Is located in the Department of Junin, part of the Junín Region.

== Geography ==
The Chunta mountain range traverses the district. Some of the highest peaks of the district are listed below:

- Aymara
- Chuntani
- Inti Wañunan
- Kapillayuq
- Kiswarniyuq
- Puka
- Puka Mach'ay
- Puka Rumi
- Walsa
- Waqra Willka
- Warmi Mach'ay
- Wira Challwa
- Yawray

The largest lakes of the district are Aqchiqucha, Quylluqucha, Walsaqucha, Wich'iqucha, Yuraqqucha and Ñawinqucha some of which belong to the largest lakes of Peru.
