= Sicaya, Peru =

Sicaya
- Village
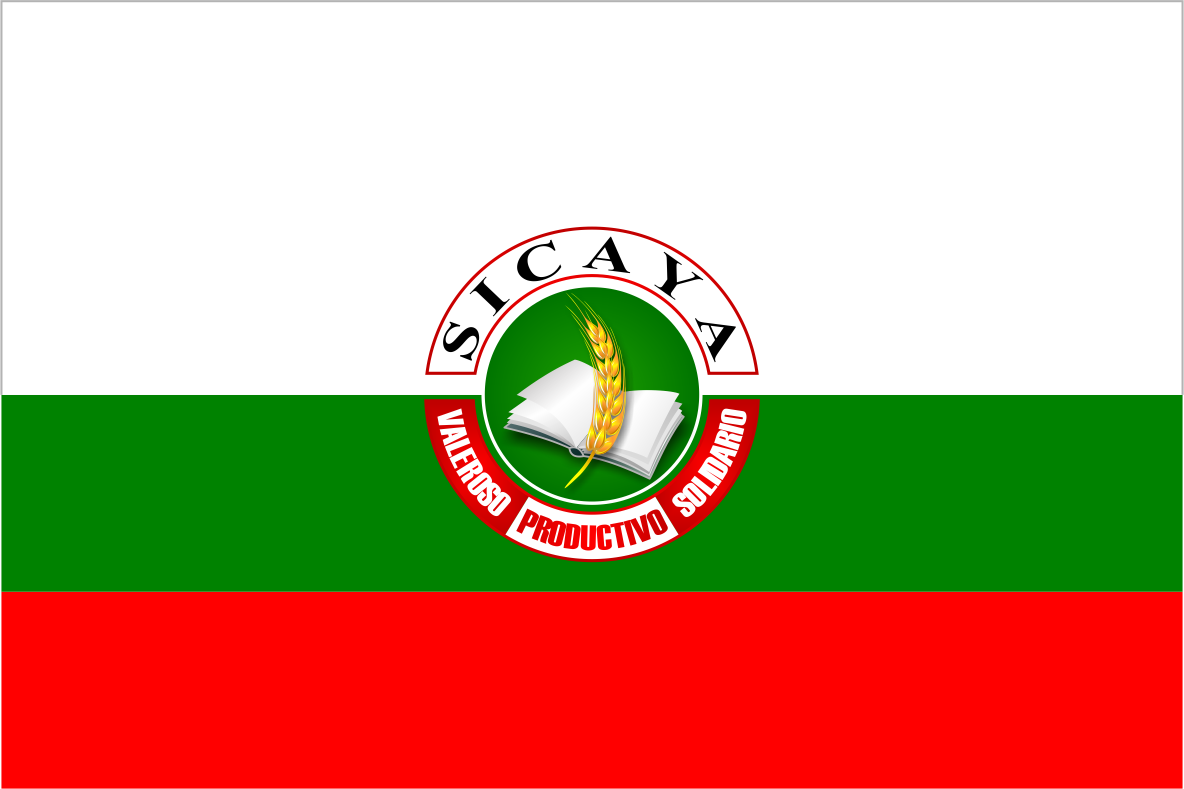
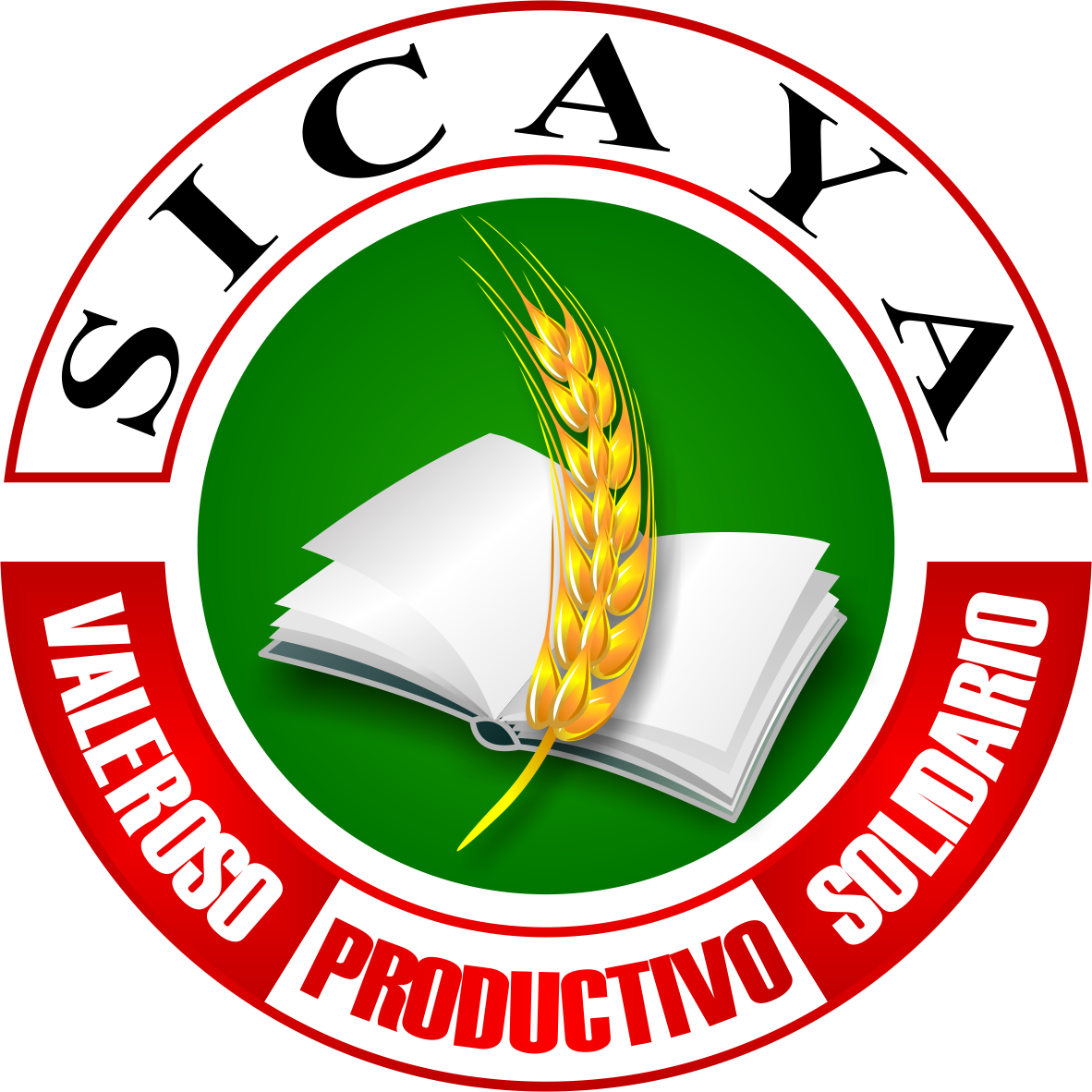
- Flag Seal

- Location within Peru
- Coordinates: 12°00′54.70″S 75°16′48.54″W
- Country: Peru
- Region: Junín
- Province: Huancayo
- District: Sicaya

Government
  - Mayor: Angel Abelardo Napaico Gutarra
- Elevation: 3,282 m (10,768 ft)
- Time zone: UTC-5 (PET)

Sicaya is a town in Central Peru, capital of the district Sicaya in the province Huancayo in the region Junín.
