= Chilca District, Huancayo =

Chilca Ch'illka
- District
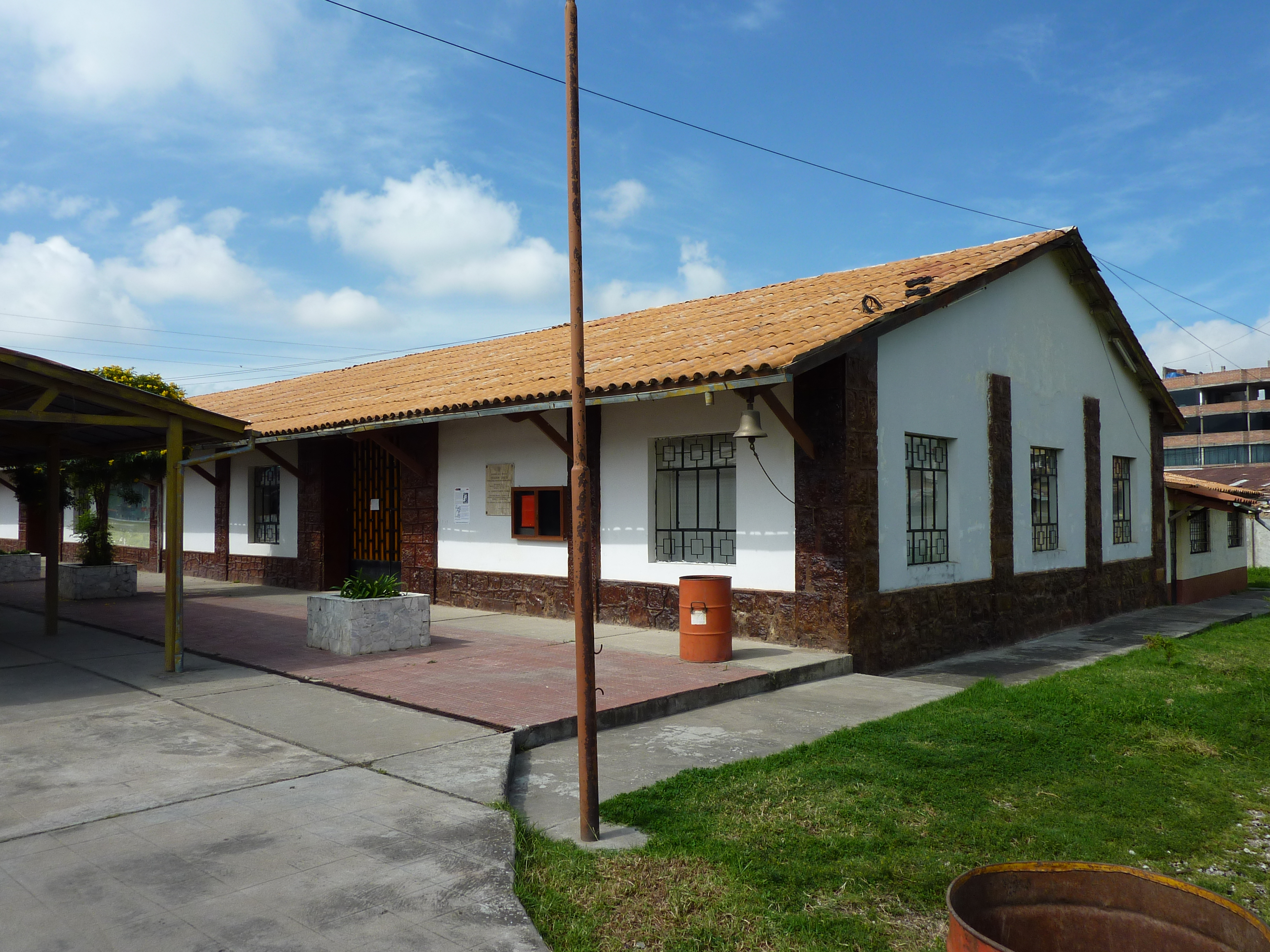
- Chilca, Huancayo train station
- Interactive map of Chilca
- Country: Peru
- Region: Junín
- Province: Huancayo
- Founded: May 2, 1957
- Capital: Chilca

Government
  - Mayor: Hector Castro Pimentel

Area
  - Total: 8.3 km^{2} (3.2 sq mi)
- Elevation: 3,275 m (10,745 ft)

Population (2017 Census)
  - Total: 91,851
  - Density: 11,000/km^{2} (29,000/sq mi)
- Time zone: UTC-5 (PET)
- UBIGEO: 120107

Chilca District is one of twenty-eight districts of the province Huancayo in Peru. It has a population of approximately 92,000 people.
