= Pilcomayo District =

Coordinates: 12.0549°S 75.2661°W

Pilcomayo Pillkumayu
- District
- Interactive map of Pilcomayo
- Country: Peru
- Region: Junín
- Province: Huancayo
- Founded: September 15, 1944
- Capital: Pilcomayo

Government
  - Mayor: Jorge Baldeon Gutarra

Area
  - Total: 20.5 km^{2} (7.9 sq mi)
- Elevation: 3,247 m (10,653 ft)

Population (2005 census)
  - Total: 12,405
  - Density: 605/km^{2} (1,570/sq mi)
- Time zone: UTC-5 (PET)
- UBIGEO: 120125

Pilcomayo District is one of twenty-eight districts of the province Huancayo in Peru. The population of the district is 21,237 as of 2017 census.
