= Warmi Mach'ay =

Mountain in Peru

- Location within Peru

Highest point
- Elevation: 4,800 m (15,700 ft)
- Coordinates: 12°38′15″S 75°32′39″W

Geography
- Location: Peru, Huancavelica Region, Junín Region
- Parent range: Andes

Warmi Mach'ay (Quechua warmi woman, mach'ay cave, "woman cave", Hispanicized spelling Huarmimachay) is a mountain in the Andes of Peru, about 4,800 m (15,748 ft) high. It is situated in the Huancavelica Region, Huancavelica Province, Acobambilla District, and in the Junín Region, Huancayo Province, Chongos Alto District. Warmi Mach'ay lies between the lakes named Warmiqucha in the southeast and Quylluqucha in the northwest.
