= Cullhuas District =

Coordinates: 12.2223°S 75.1731°W

Cullhuas
- District
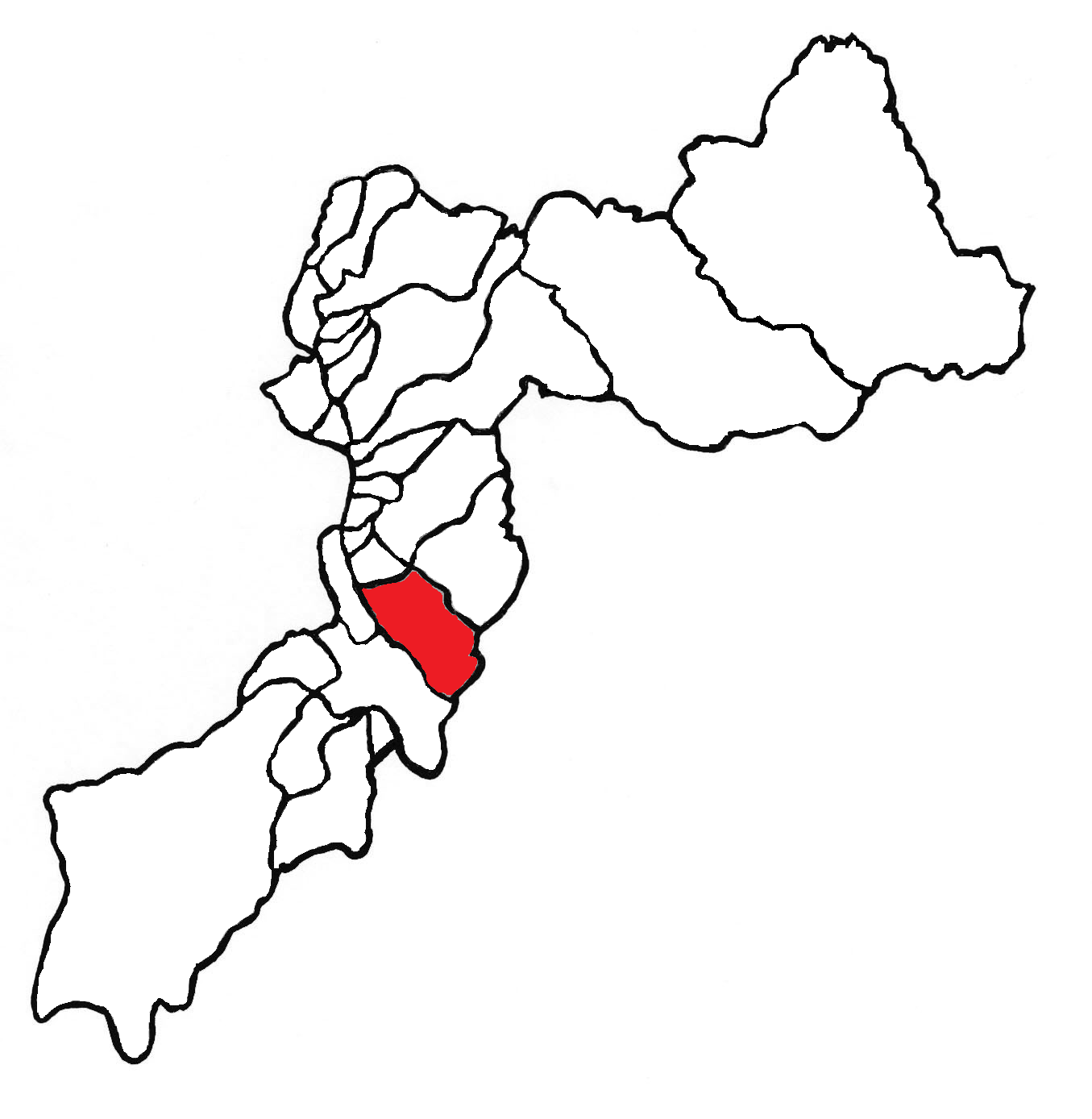
- Cullhuas
- Interactive map of Cullhuas
- Country: Peru
- Region: Junín
- Province: Huancayo
- Founded: April 23, 1954
- Capital: Cullhuas

Government
  - Mayor: Jeremias Heraclio Olivera Aliaga

Area
  - Total: 108.01 km^{2} (41.70 sq mi)
- Elevation: 3,663 m (12,018 ft)

Population (2005 census)
  - Total: 2,940
  - Density: 27.2/km^{2} (70.5/sq mi)
- Time zone: UTC-5 (PET)
- UBIGEO: 120113

Cullhuas District is one of twenty-eight districts of the province Huancayo in Peru.

== Ethnic groups ==
The people in the district are mainly indigenous citizens of Quechua descent. Quechua is the language which the majority of the population (63.39%) learnt to speak in childhood, 36.53% of the residents started speaking using the Spanish language (2007 Peru Census).
