= Chicche District =

Coordinates: 12.2958°S 75.2981°W

Chicche
- District
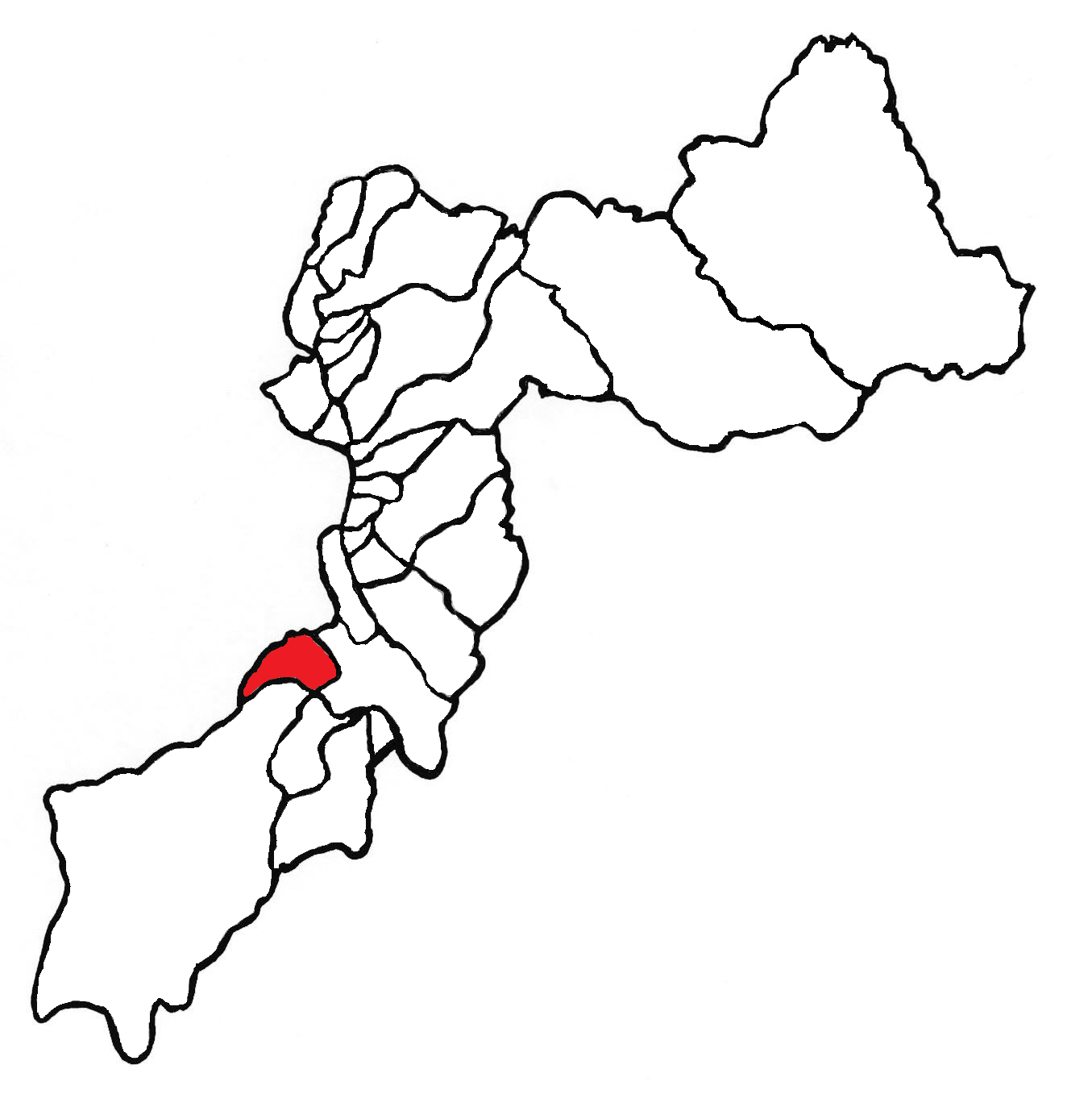
- Location of the district in the province of Huancayo, department of Junín, Peru
- Interactive map of Chicche
- Country: Peru
- Region: Junín
- Province: Huancayo
- Founded: December 2, 1961
- Capital: Chicche

Government
  - Mayor: Ruben Meza Bonifacio

Area
  - Total: 43.43 km^{2} (16.77 sq mi)
- Elevation: 3,540 m (11,610 ft)

Population (2005 census)
  - Total: 1,378
  - Density: 31.73/km^{2} (82.18/sq mi)
- Time zone: UTC-5 (PET)
- UBIGEO: 120106

Chicche District is one of twenty-eight districts of the province Huancayo in Peru.
