= Lake Acchicocha =

Lake in Junín, Peru

- Location within Peru
- Location: Peru; Junín Region
- Coordinates: 12°38′50″S 75°28′42″W
- Max. length: 5 km (3.1 mi)
- Max. width: 1.10 km (0.68 mi)
- Surface elevation: 4,591 m (15,062 ft)

Lake Acchicocha (possibly from Quechua aqchi hawk or sparrowhawk, qucha lake,"hawk lake") is a lake in Peru located in the Junín Region, Huancayo Province, Chongos Alto District. It is situated at a height of approximately 4,591 metres (15,062 ft), about 5 km long and 1.10 km at its widest point. Lake Acchicocha lies south of Yurajcocha, southeast of Huichicocha, northeast of Huarmicocha and north of Canllacocha.
