= Huancayo province =

Coordinates: 12°04′S 75°13′W

Huancayo
- Province
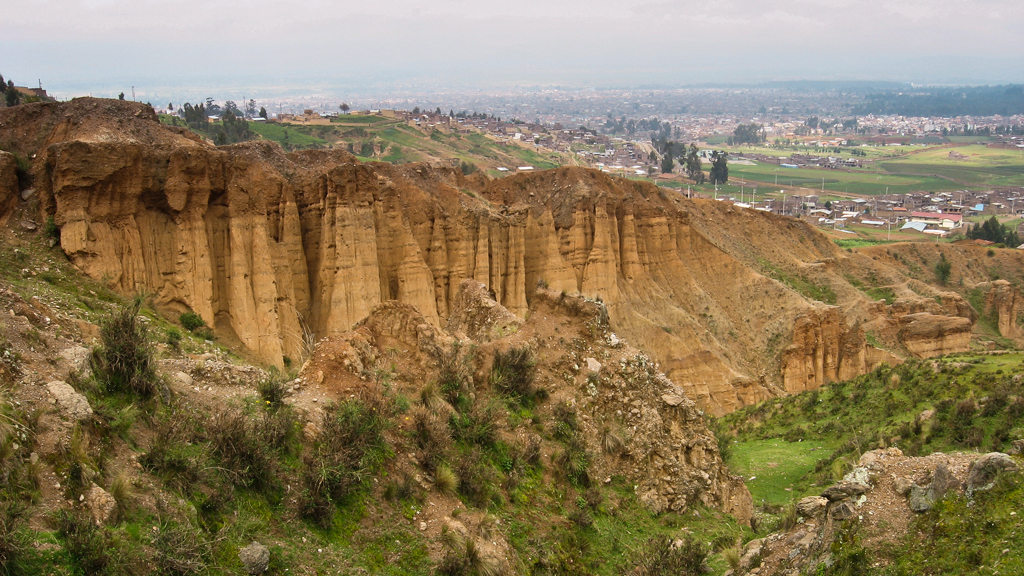
- Turi Turi (Torre Torre) rock formations near the city of Huancayo

- Flag Coat of arms

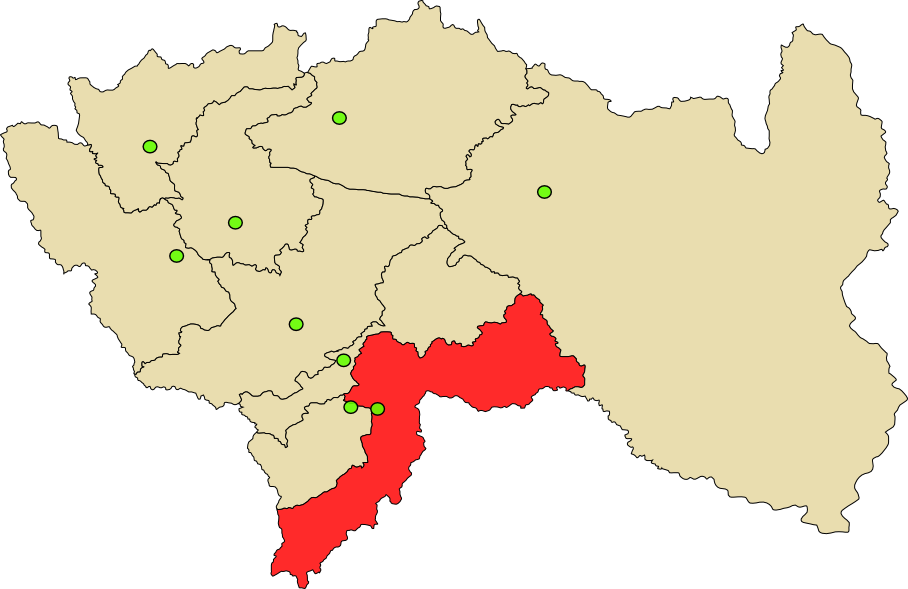
- Location of Huancayo in the Junín Region
- Country: Peru
- Region: Junín
- Capital: Huancayo

Government
  - Mayor: Henry Fernando López Cantorín

Area
  - Total: 3,558.10 km^{2} (1,373.79 sq mi)

Population
  - Total: 545,615
  - Density: 153.344/km^{2} (397.160/sq mi)
- UBIGEO: 1201

Huancayo is a province of Peru. It is one of the 9 provinces comprising the Junín Region. It borders to the north with the province of Concepción, the east with the province of Satipo, the south with the Huancavelica Region and the west with the province of Chupaca. The province has an approximate population of 545,615 inhabitants. The capital of the province is the city of Huancayo.

== Geography ==
The Chunta mountain range and the Waytapallana mountain range traverse the province. Some of the highest peaks of the province are listed below:

- Anchhi
- Aymara
- Chhaqllaqucha
- Chawpi Ranra
- Ch'iwan
- Ch'uspi
- Inka Rumi
- Inti Wañunan
- Kapillayuq
- Kawituyuq
- Kimsa Tullpa
- Kuchilluyuq
- Kuntur Pallana
- Lasu Tumi
- Piñaqucha
- Puka
- Puka Rumi
- Pukaqucha
- Pukara
- Putkaqucha
- Puywan
- Qalla Qhata
- Quchas
- Saqsa
- Suyt'u Kancha
- Talwis
- Ututuyuq
- Walsa
- Waqra Willka
- Warmi Punta
- Warmi Mach'ay
- Wayta Wayta
- Waytapallana
- Waytapallana (Aychana)
- Wira Challwa
- Yana Uqsha
- Yawray
- Yuraq Q'asa
- Yuraqqucha Ulu

Some of the largest lakes in the province of Huancayo are Aqchiqucha, Hatunqucha, Quylluqucha, Walsaqucha, Wich'iqucha, Yuraqqucha and Ñawinqucha.

== Political division ==
The province is divided into 28 districts over an area of 4 711,15 km^{2}. These districts are:

Nº	Districts	Capital	Area	Elevation
1	Huancayo	Huancayo	237,55 km²	3 249 m.
2	Carhuacallanga	Carhuacallanga	13,78 km²	3 770 m.
3	Chacapampa	Chacapampa	120,72 km²	3 420 m.
4	Chicche	Chicche	43,43 km²	3 540 m.
5	Chilca	Chilca	8,3 km²	3 275 m.
6	Chongos Alto	Chongos Alto	701,75 km²	3 544 m.
7	Chupuro	Chupuro	13,15 km²	3 175 m.
8	Colca	Colca	113,06 km²	3 516 m.
9	Cullhuas	Cullhuas	108,01 km²	3 663 m.
10	El Tambo	El Tambo	73,56 km²	3 260 m.
11	Huacrapuquio	Huacrapuquio	24,10 km²	3 247 m.
12	Hualhuas	Hualhuas	24,82 km²	3 280 m.
13	Huancán	Huancán	12,00 km²	3 210 m.
14	Huasicancha	Huasicancha	47,61 km²	3 716 m.
15	Huayucachi	Huayucachi	13,13 km²	3 201 m.
16	Ingenio	Ingenio	53,29 km²	3 460 m.
17	Pariahuanca	Pariahuanca	617,50 km²	2 070 m.
18	Pilcomayo	Pilcomayo	20,50 km²	3 247 m.
19	Pucará	Pucará	110,49 km²	3 362 m.
20	Quichuay	Quichuay	34,79 km²	3 430 m.
21	Quilcas	Quilcas	167,98 km²	3 330 m.
22	San Agustín	San Agustín	23,09 km²	3 250 m.
23	San Jerónimo de Tunán	San Jerónimo de Tunán	20,99 km²	3 274 m.
24	Saño	Saño	11,59 km²	3 282 m.
25	Santo Domingo de Acobamba	Santo Domingo de Acobamba	778,02 km²	2 450 m.
26	Sapallanga	Sapallanga	119,02 km²	3 285 m.
27	Sicaya	Sicaya	42,30 km²	3 282 m.
28	Viques	Viques	3,57 km²	3 195 m.
Source: Regional Government of Junin - Huancayo

== See also ==
- Ankap Wachanan
- Apu Inka
- Wari Willka
