= Sicaya District =

Coordinates: 12.0167°S 75.2783°W

Sicaya
- District
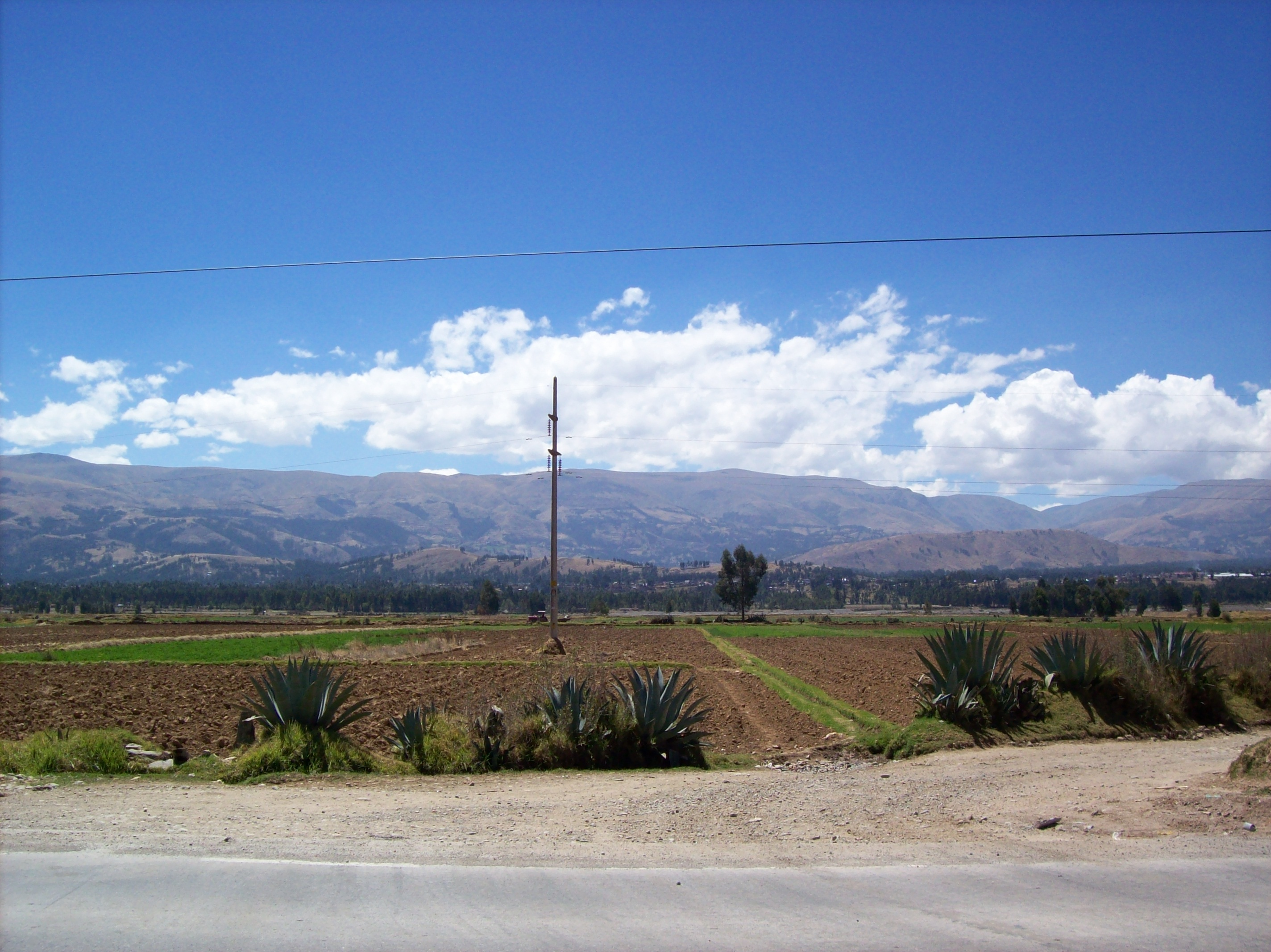

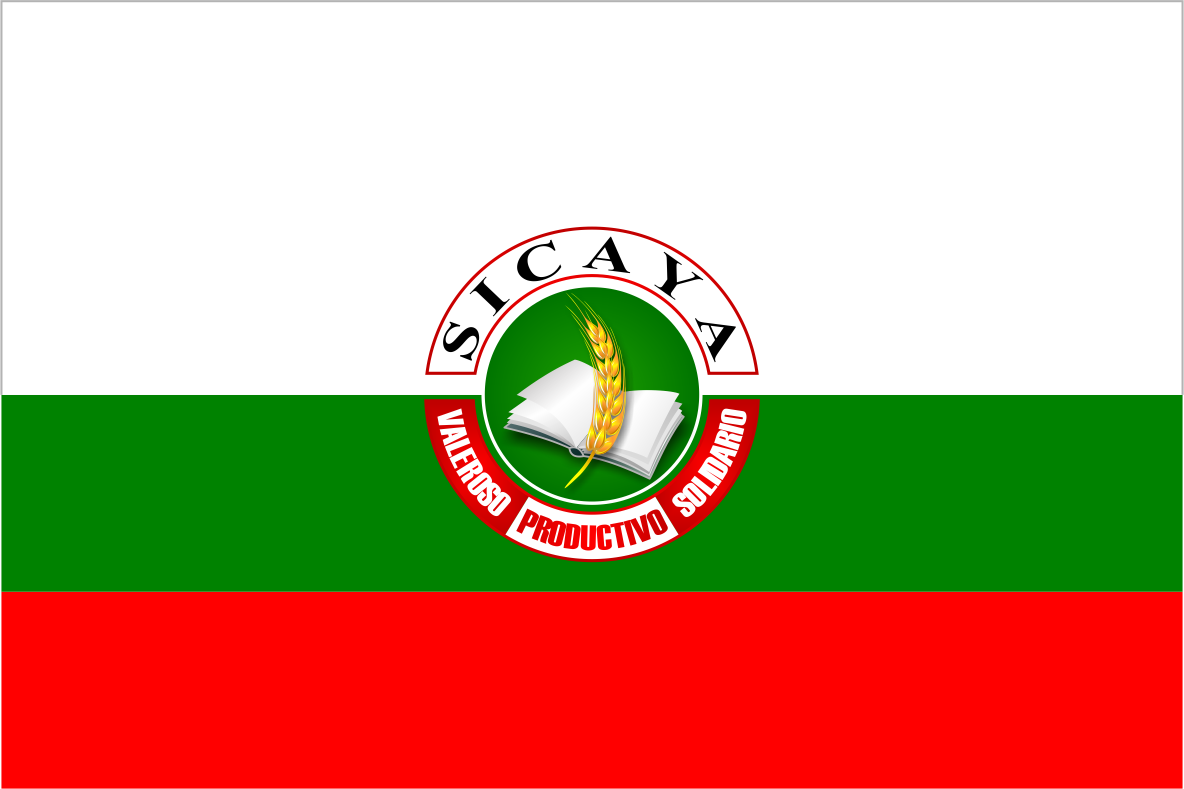
- Flag Coat of arms
- Interactive map of Sicaya
- Country: Peru
- Region: Junín
- Province: Huancayo
- Founded: January 2, 1857
- Capital: Sicaya

Government
  - Mayor: Angel Abelardo Napaico Gutarra

Area
  - Total: 42.3 km^{2} (16.3 sq mi)
- Elevation: 3,282 m (10,768 ft)

Population (2005 census)
  - Total: 7,274
  - Density: 172/km^{2} (445/sq mi)
- Time zone: UTC-5 (PET)
- UBIGEO: 120134

Sicaya District is one of twenty-eight districts of the province Huancayo in Peru.
