= Pucará District, Huancayo =

Coordinates: 12.1722°S 75.1473°W

Pucará Pukara
- District
- Interactive map of Pucará
- Country: Peru
- Region: Junín
- Province: Huancayo
- Founded: December 6, 1918
- Capital: Pucará

Government
  - Mayor: Jorge Socrates Camborda Huacaychuco

Area
  - Total: 110.49 km^{2} (42.66 sq mi)
- Elevation: 3,362 m (11,030 ft)

Population (2005 census)
  - Total: 6,184
  - Density: 55.97/km^{2} (145.0/sq mi)
- Time zone: UTC-5 (PET)
- UBIGEO: 120126

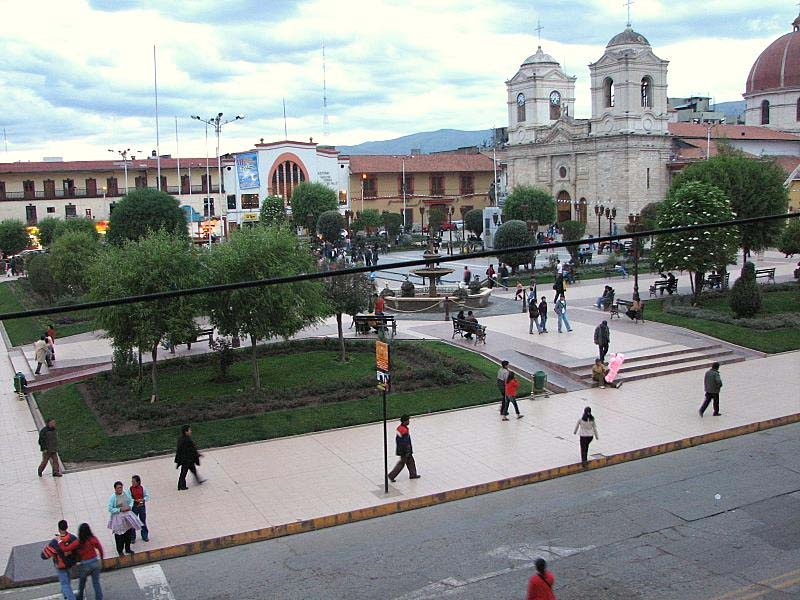

Pucará District is one of twenty-eight districts of the province Huancayo in Peru.
