= Huarmicochas Lakes =

Group of lakes in Peru

- Location within Peru
- Location: Peru; Junín Region
- Coordinates: 11°55′50″S 75°52′04″W

Huarmicochas Lakes (possibly from Quechua warmi woman, qucha lake) are a group of lakes in Peru located in the Junín Region, Jauja Province, Canchayllo District. They are located east of the Pariacaca mountain range.
