= Huasicancha District =

Coordinates: 12.3324°S 75.2824°W

Huasicancha Wasikancha
- District
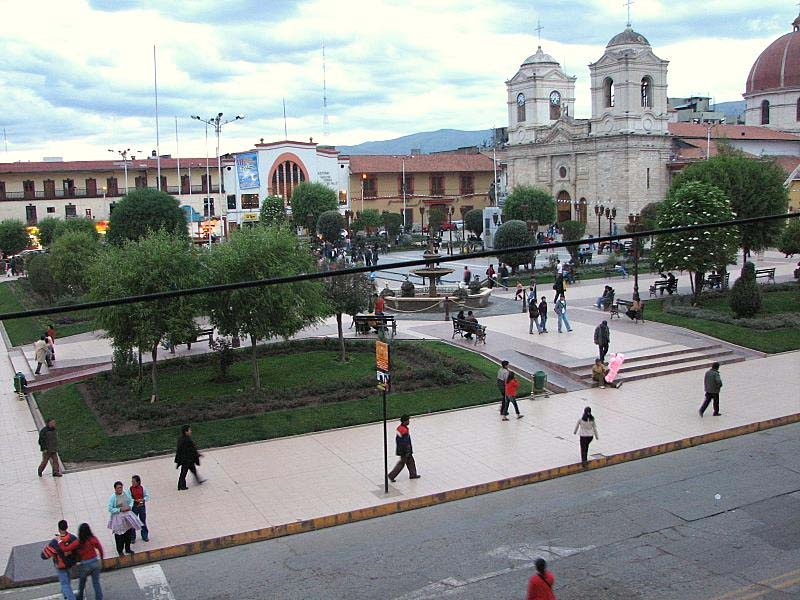
- Interactive map of Huasicancha
- Country: Peru
- Region: Junín
- Province: Huancayo
- Founded: April 07, 1930
- Capital: Huasicancha

Government
  - Mayor: Ernesto Armando Yaranga Llacua

Area
  - Total: 47.61 km^{2} (18.38 sq mi)
- Elevation: 3,716 m (12,192 ft)

Population (2005 census)
  - Total: 1,103
  - Density: 23.17/km^{2} (60.00/sq mi)
- Time zone: UTC-5 (PET)
- UBIGEO: 120120

Huasicancha District is one of twenty-eight districts of the province Huancayo in Peru.
