= Yurajcocha =

- Tintayari / Huampuni
- Location within Peru
- Location: Peru; Junín Region
- Coordinates: 12°33′06″S 75°29′24″W
- Max. length: 5 km (3.1 mi)
- Max. width: 0.84 km (0.52 mi)
- Surface elevation: 4,466 m (14,652 ft)

Yurajcocha Dam
- Location within Peru

Dam and spillways
- Height: 10.2 m (33 ft)

Power Station
- Operator: Electroperu

Yurajcocha (possibly from Quechua yuraq white, qucha lake, "white lake"), Tintayari or Huampuni (possibly from Aymara wampu boat, -ni, a suffix, "the one with a boat") is a lake in Peru located in the Junín Region, Huancayo Province, Chongos Alto District. It is situated at a height of approximately 4,466 metres (14,652 ft), about 5 km long and 0.84 km at its widest point. Yurajcocha lies north of Acchicocha and northeast of Huichicocha. The lake belongs to the watershed of the Mantaro River.

In 1999 the Yurajcocha dam was built at the northern end of the lake at 12°31′56.8″S 75°29′46.49″W. The dam is 10.2 m (11.2 yd) high. It is operated by Electroperu.
