= Plaza El Coliseo =

Plaza El Coliseo may refer to:

- Plaza El Coliseo (Huancayo), a bull-fighting stadium in Peru
- Plaza El Coliseo (Trujillo), a bull-fighting stadium in Peru
