= Qalla Qhata =

Mountain in Peru

- Location within Peru

Highest point
- Elevation: 5,200 m (17,100 ft)
- Coordinates: 11°54′39″S 75°04′07″W

Geography
- Location: Peru, Junín Region
- Parent range: Andes, Waytapallana

Qalla Qhata (Quechua qalla carved stone, cobblestone; circular spindle disk; cheek, qhata slope, hillside, hispanicized spelling Jallacata) is a mountain in the Waytapallana mountain range in Peru, about 5,200 m (17,100 ft) high. It is located in the Junín Region, Huancayo Province, Huancayo District, west of Waytapallana.
