= Putkaqucha =

Mountain in Peru

- Location within Peru

Highest point
- Elevation: 5,236 m (17,178 ft)
- Coordinates: 11°52′23″S 75°04′25″W

Geography
- Location: Peru, Junín Region
- Parent range: Andes, Waytapallana

Putkaqucha (Quechua putka muddy (Jauja Quechua), qucha lake, "muddy lake", Hispanicized spelling Putcacocha) is a 5,236-metre-high (17,178 ft) mountain in the Waytapallana mountain range in Peru. It is located in the Junín Region, Concepción Province, Comas District, and in the Huancayo Province, on the border of the districts of El Tambo and Quilcas. Putkaqucha lies southwest of Puywan and northwest of Waytapallana and Ch'uspi.
