= Kawituyuq =

Mountain in Peru

- Location within Peru

Highest point
- Elevation: 4,803 m (15,758 ft)
- Coordinates: 11°58′34″S 75°03′24″W

Geography
- Location: Peru, Junín Region, Huancayo Province
- Parent range: Andes

Kawituyuq (Quechua kawitu camp bed; rocking chair; swing; barbecue, -yuq a suffix to indicate ownership, possibly "the one with a camp bed", also spelled Cahuituyoc) is a 4,803-metre-high (15,758 ft) mountain in the Andes of Peru. It is located in the Junín Region, Huancayo Province, Huancayo District. Kawituyuq lies south of the Waytapallana mountain range, southwest of Yana Uqsha.
