= Huancayo (disambiguation) =

Huancayo may refer to:

- Huancayo, a city in Peru.
- Huancayo District, a district in the Huancayo province.
- Huancayo Province, a province in the Junín region.
- Huancayo Airport, an airport in Huancayo.
