= Josué Sánchez =

Peruvian painter (born 1945)

Josué Sánchez Cerrón
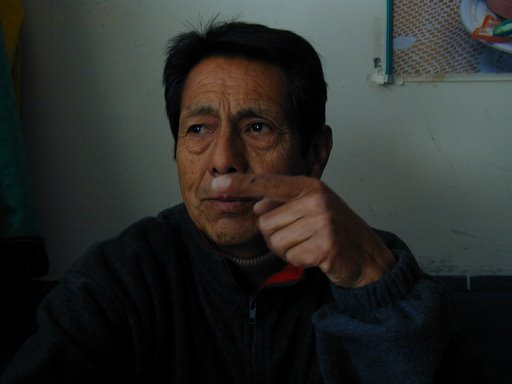
- Born: 1945 (age 80–81); Huancayo, Peru
- Education: Escuela de Bellas Artes, Universidad Nacional del Centro del Perú
- Known for: Painting, Muralism, Sculpture
- Notable work: Murals in Chongos Altos, Morococha, Convento de Ocopa, Aachen (Germany), Litzelstetten (Germany)
- Movement: Andean Art, Magical Realism
- Spouse: Diana Casas
- Children: Álvaro Sánchez
- Awards: BBC Mundo Blog Award (2006)

Josué Sánchez Cerron is a Peruvian painter born in Huancayo, Peru in 1945.

== Early life, education, and work as an artist ==
=== Growing up in the Campo ===
As a child growing up, Sanchez lived in the countryside and spent his youth surrounded by plants, birds, and the small creatures that lived in the fields. At night, Sanchez's mother would tell him stories of the Andes and the magical creatures who lived there. By day, Sanchez lived close to a factory that fabricated tejas, the clay tiles traditionally used for rooftops in the Andes, and Sanchez earned pocket change as an artisan working the clay to make small sculptures of animals that the factory gave to its customers.

=== Education ===
Sanchez had originally wanted to be a musician, and considers himself a sculptor rather than a painter. There were only eighteen students in the school of fine arts, and only two worked in sculpture but Sanchez saw this as an advantage because he and another student had the workshop for sculpture all to themselves. Sanchez worked for a publicity agency in 1963, and in 1969 he completed his studies in the School of Fine Arts (Escuela de Bellas Artes) at the Universidad Nacional del Centro del Perú (UNCP) in Huancayo, Peru.

=== Work as an artist ===
The beginning of Sanchez's journey as an artist was not easy, and at his first exhibition in Lima, his paintings were severely criticized by critics for his use of color.

==== Inspiration ====
Marina Núñez del Prado was one of the most widely acclaimed sculptors of Latin America, her work characterized by rolling curves and bulk and by the use of such spectacular materials as black granite, alabaster, basalt and white onyx, as well a different native Bolivian woods. Among her outstanding sculptures White Venus (1960), a stylized female body in white onyx, is among her most admired works. Another famous work is Mother and Child, sculpted in white onyx. In 1938, she left her post and traveled through Bolivia and Peru, Argentina, Uruguay, the United States, Europe, and Egypt. Between 1940-48 she worked and organized exhibitions of her work in the United States while on a scholarship. In 1946 'Miners in Revolt', inspired by the miners in Bolivia's Potosí region, won a gold medal in a New York exhibition. In 1948 she returned to Bolivia, finally settling down in La Paz in 1958. By 1972 she had moved to Peru where she lived with her husband, a Peruvian writer. When Marina Núñez del Prado saw Sanchez's pieces in the exhibition she encouraged Sanchez to continue and told Sanchez that if his pieces were exhibited in Europe they would be well received.

"Mudo de la emoción, apenas atiné a balbucear unas palabras cuando ella acercándose me dijo en voz alta: 'Felicitaciones, esta exposición en París hoy, sería un boom'," says Sanchez. "Fue un momento glorioso. ¡Sí que fastidié a los pintores! Y fue el espaldarazo que necesitaba para consolidar un estilo basado en una estética andina."

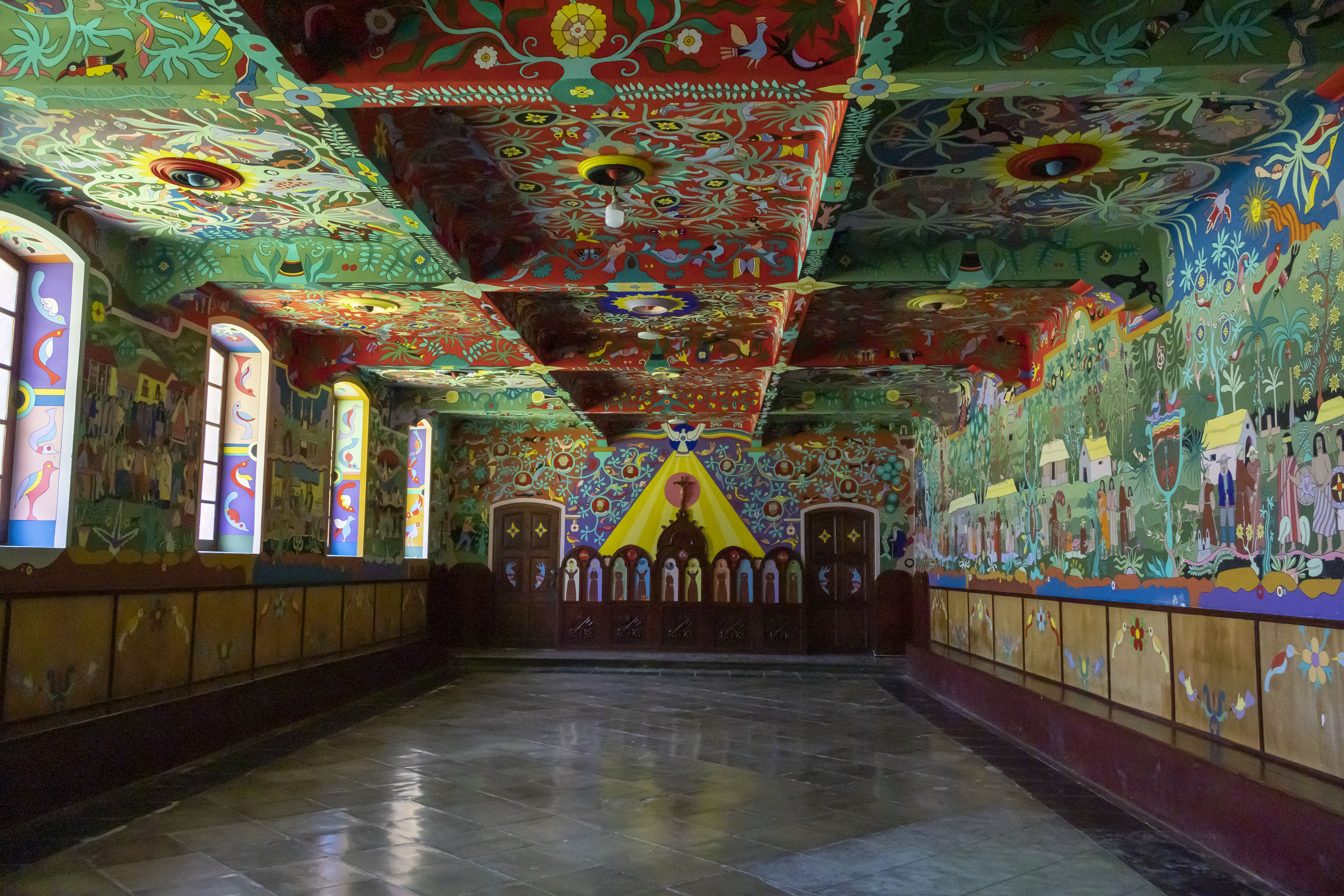
Mural in the Convento of Ocopa

Sanchez is best known as a muralist and has completed five major mural paintings - three in Peru and two in Germany. Sanchez painted murals in the Catholic churches in Chongos Altos in 1973, in Morococha in 1982, and in the Convento de Ocopa in 1993. Marina Núñez del Prado's prescience of Sanchez's acceptance in Europe came to fruition when Sanchez traveled to Germany in 1983 to paint a mural in the church of the Holy Spirit in Aachen and later completed another mural in Germany in the church of Litzelstetten by the banks of Lake Constance. Sanchez has provided his work for commercial work as when he provided the cover for "Plantas en la Cultura Andina" published in Huancayo in 2000.

Sánchez recently won the BBCMundo.com blogs contest in 2006. The winning work is called "Todavía No Pinto Canas", which won in the category for elderly people. "Todavía No Pinto Canas" won over 84 different works presented by other artists.

Sanchez has served as an inspiration for younger Peruvian artists like Daniel Pickens of Huancayo.

== Artistic origins, inspiration, and critique ==
=== Andean worldview of life, customs and popular myths ===
Sanchez paints everyday life, customs, and popular myths from Andean life in Peru. Sanchez primarily paints rural themes. Lima, the capital of Peru, has little attraction for Sanchez.

=== Artistic critique ===
Critics of Sanchez's work like Manuel Baquerizo say that Sanchez strives to create a total composition using popular art forms, where the art is characterized by the minimalist usage and perspective of carved gourds (mates burilados), amalgamating both local and universal values with Sanchez's conception of the native and western worlds.

=== Use of traditional artisan techniques of carved gourds ===
The fundamental characteristic of Sanchez's work is how it is rooted in the artisan work of the natives of Mantaro Valley and regions of the South Andean world.

"Josué Sánchez se apoya fundamentalmente en la técnica de los artesanos. Las líneas, los diseños y los colores encendidos y contrastantes de sus primeras pinturas están tomadas de las mantas y «pullukatas» que todavía suelen portar las campesinas en la espalda," says Baquerizo.

Sanchez strives to show a total world view uncontaminated by the cities or western civilization.

What Sanchez has done then is to try to create his version of the Andean world by translating the techniques and worldview of local artisans of carved gourds into the new medium of acrylic with its expanded palette.

=== Evolution of his work ===
Sanchez's work has evolved since his earliest work in the early 1970s when his goal was to depict an Andean vision of men and their permanent relation with plants and animals of the countryside. Sanchez exalts the collective life, work, play, and ritual holidays of the peasants in an existence that seems unalterable and infinite.

Beginning in the 1980s when Peru was convulsed with the fight with Sendero Luminoso, Sanchez's work began to emphasize death and violence and presented an allegory of the massacres and genocide of thousands of peasants murdered and forgotten in clandestine burials. Although Sanchez's later work reveals more social conscience, his techniques continue within the confines of magical realism.

== Personal life ==
Sanchez is married to Diana Casas. Sanchez was 52 years old when his son Alvaro was born. With his other children already grown up, Sanchez found it marvelous to have a young child in the household.
