= UNCP =

UNCP may stand for:

- University of North Carolina at Pembroke, United States
- National University of the Center of Peru (Universidad Nacional del Centro del Perú), Peru
