= Waytapallana (Aychana) =

Mountain in Peru

- Location within Peru

Highest point
- Elevation: 4,800 m (15,700 ft)
- Listing: List of mountains in the Andes
- Coordinates: 11°51′17″S 74°58′12″W

Geography
- Location: Peru, Junín Region, Huancayo Province, Pariahuanca District
- Parent range: Andes

Waytapallana (Quechua wayta wild flower, a little bunch of flowers, pallay to collect, pallana an instrument to collect fruit / collectable, Waytapallana "a place where you collect wild flowers", hispanicized spelling Huaytapallana) is a mountain in the Andes of Peru, about 4,800 m (15,748 ft) high. It is situated in the Junín Region, Huancayo Province, Pariahuanca District. Waytapallana lies on the left bank of the Lampa River, east of the Waytapallana mountain range. The village of Aychana lies at its feet.
