= Huancayo =

- Santísima Trinidad de Huancayo; Holy Trinity of Huancayo
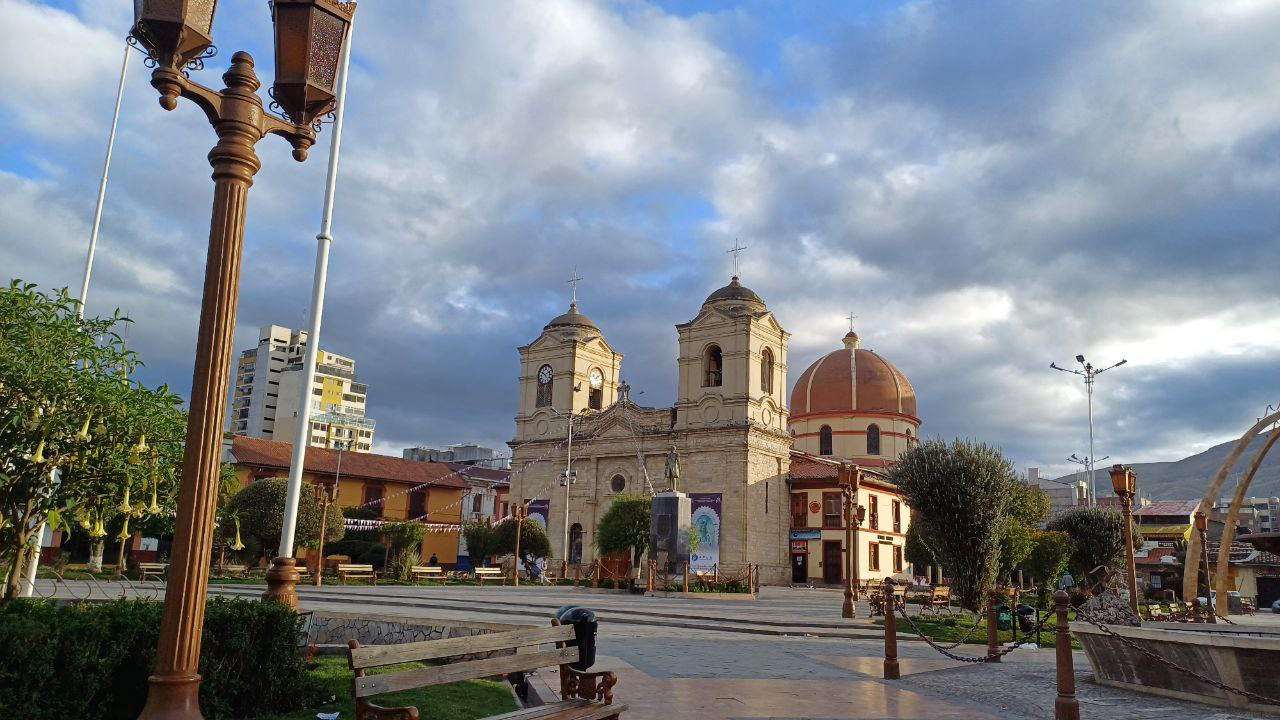
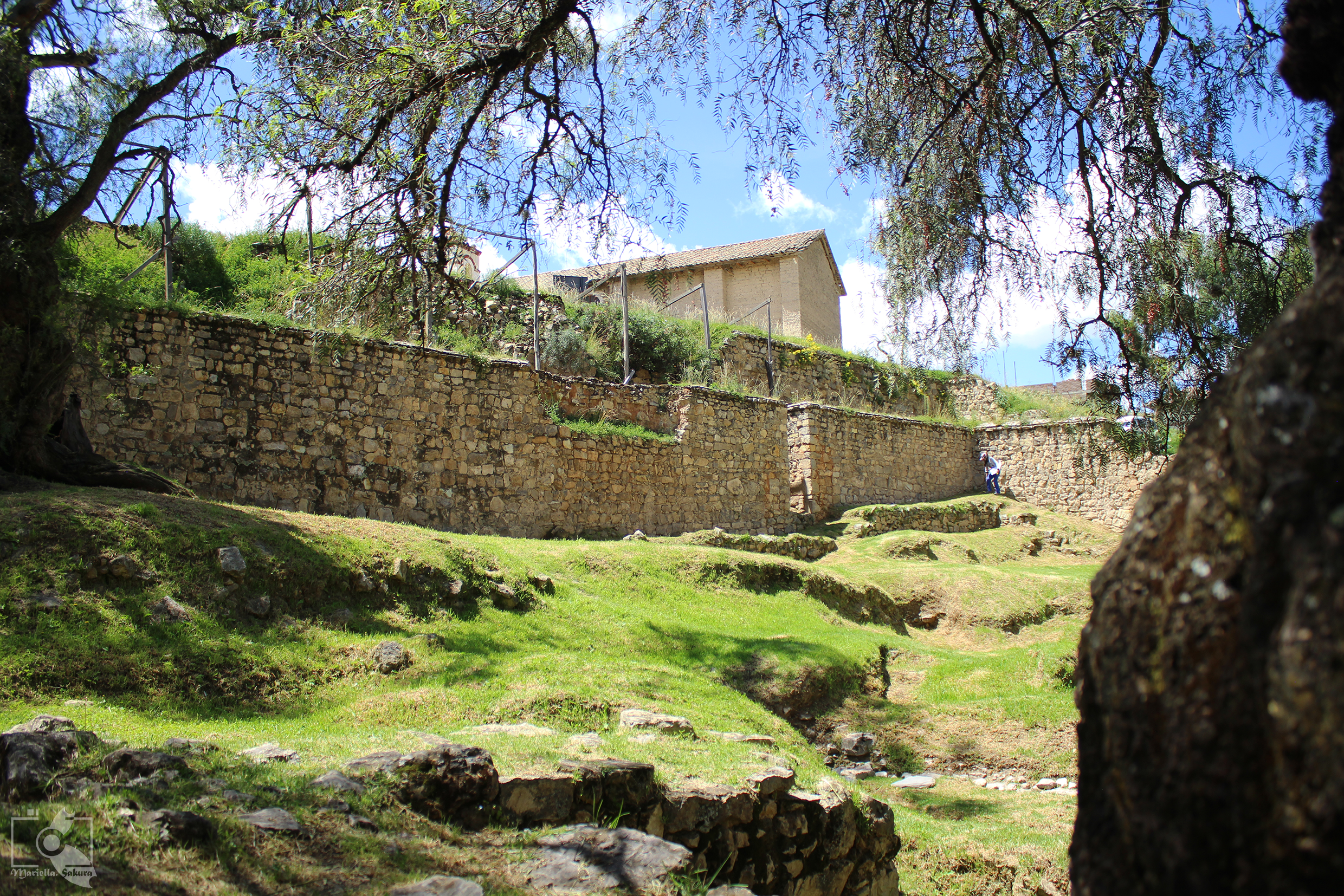
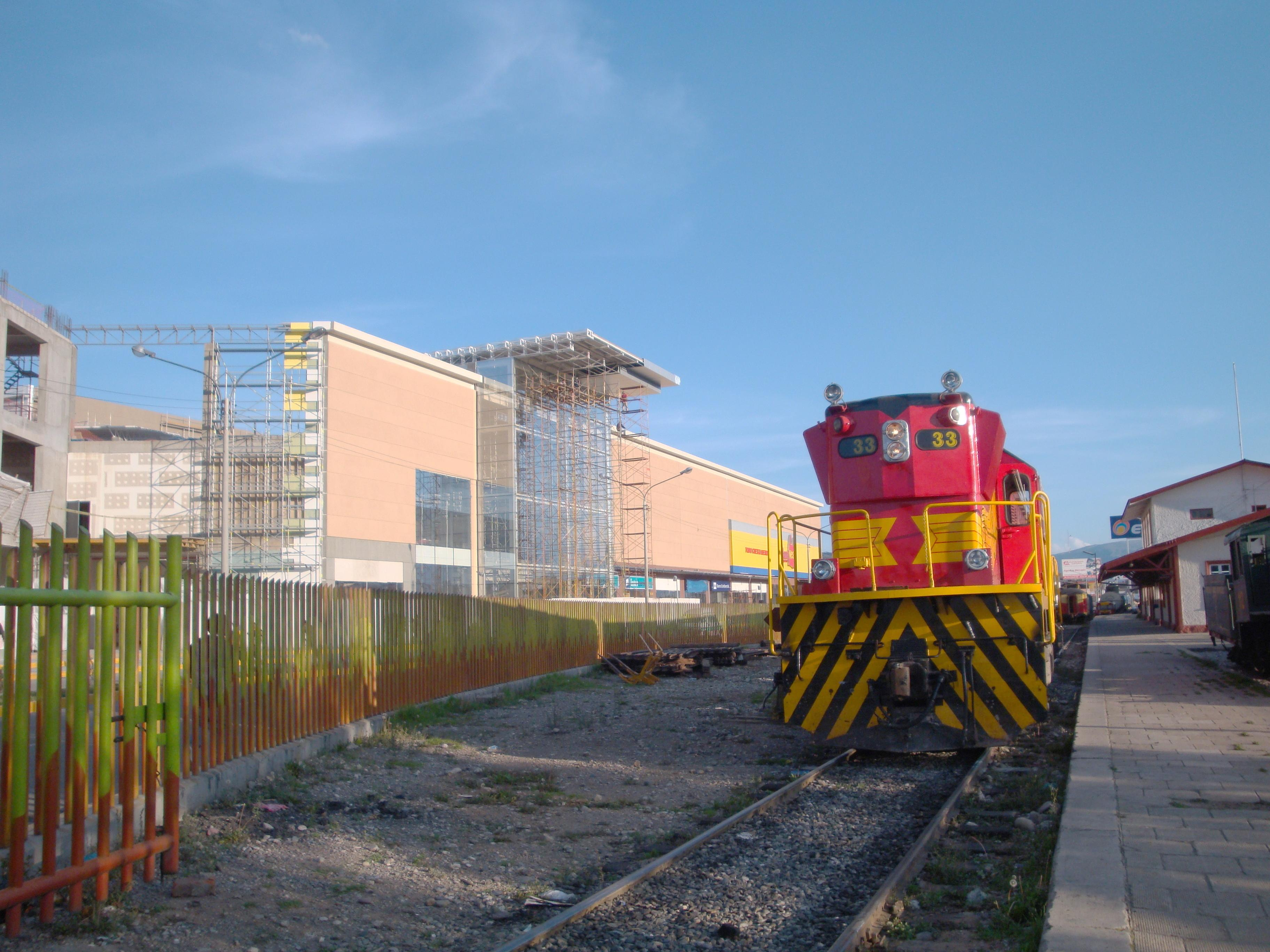
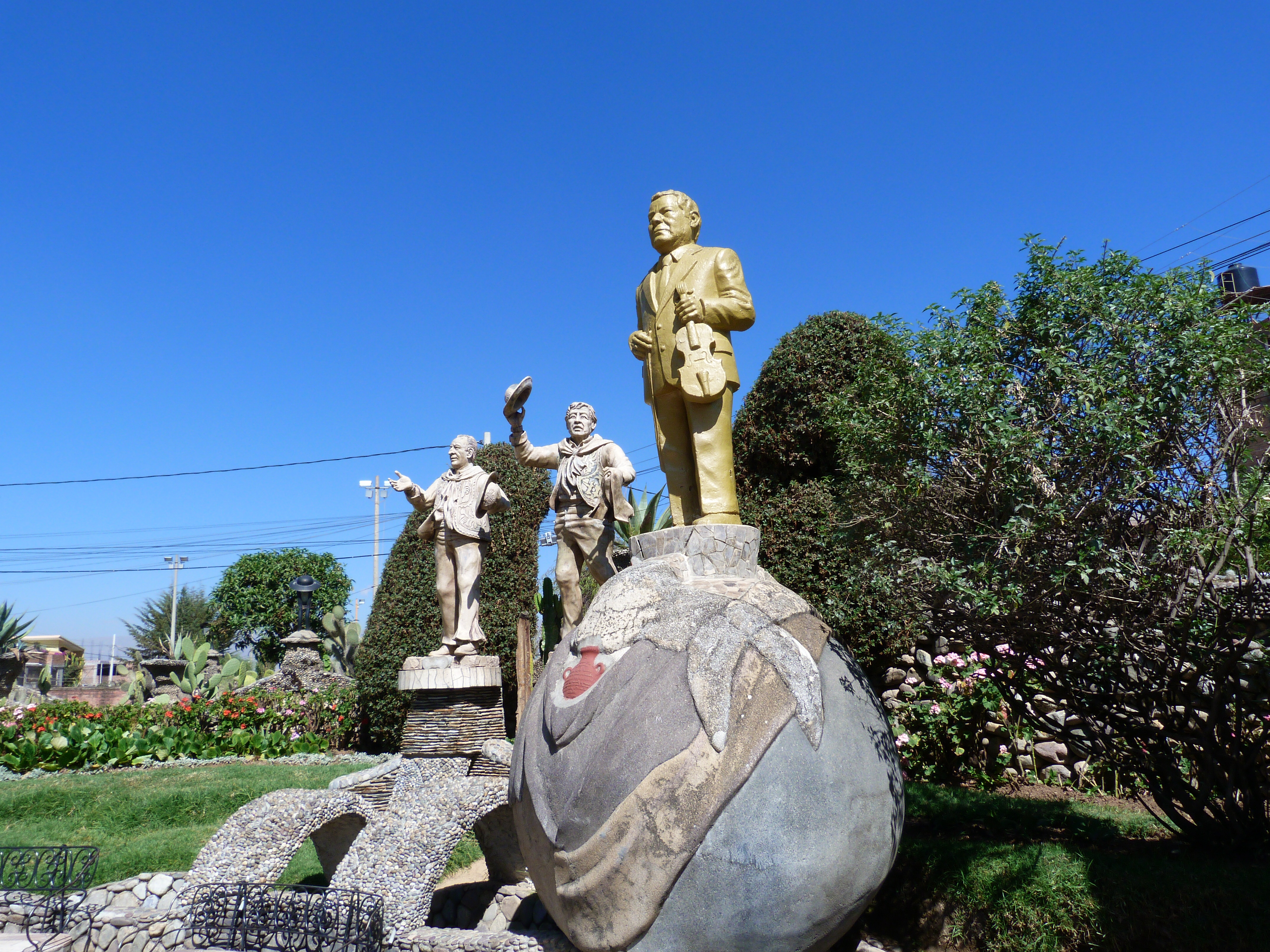
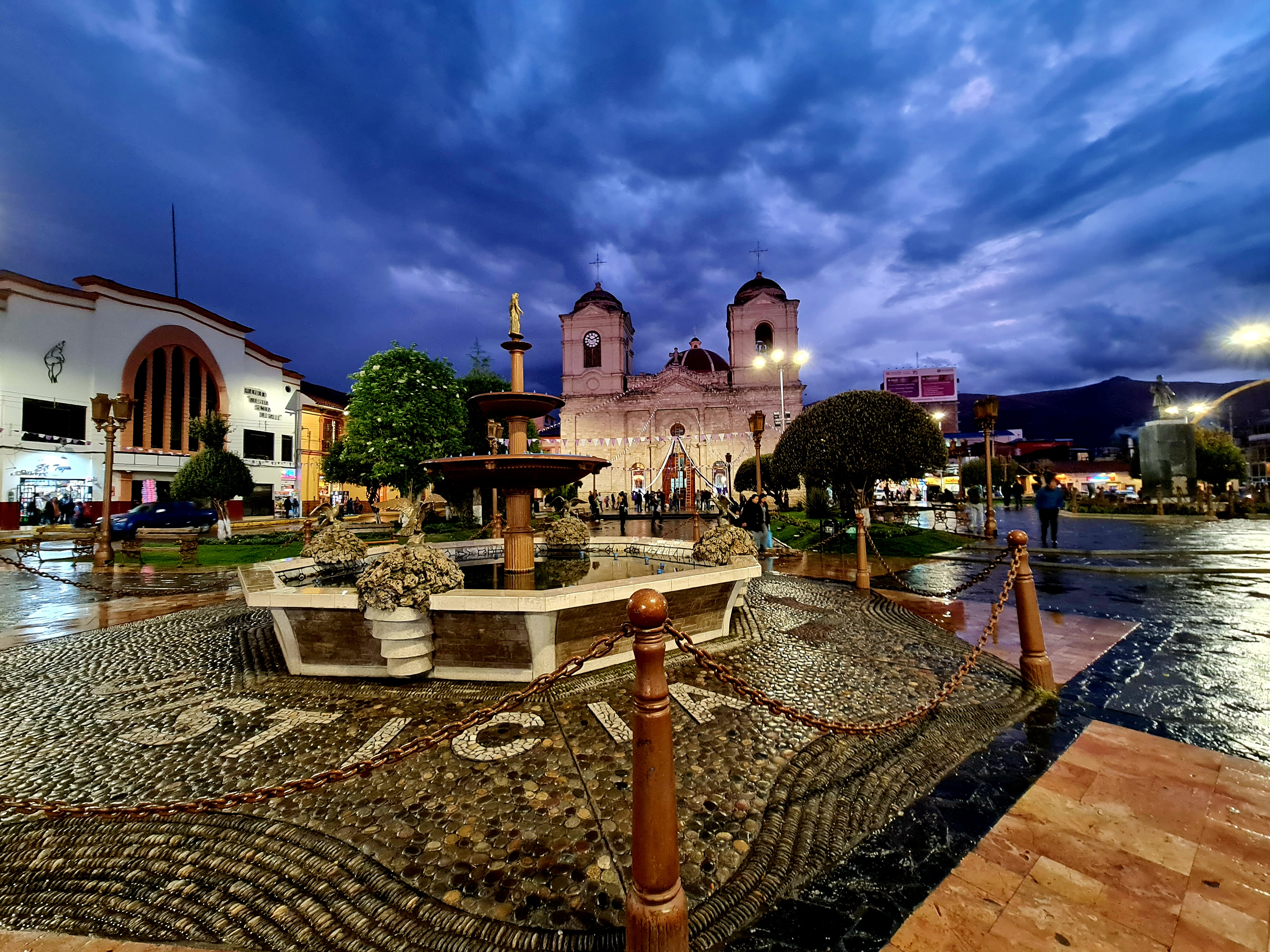
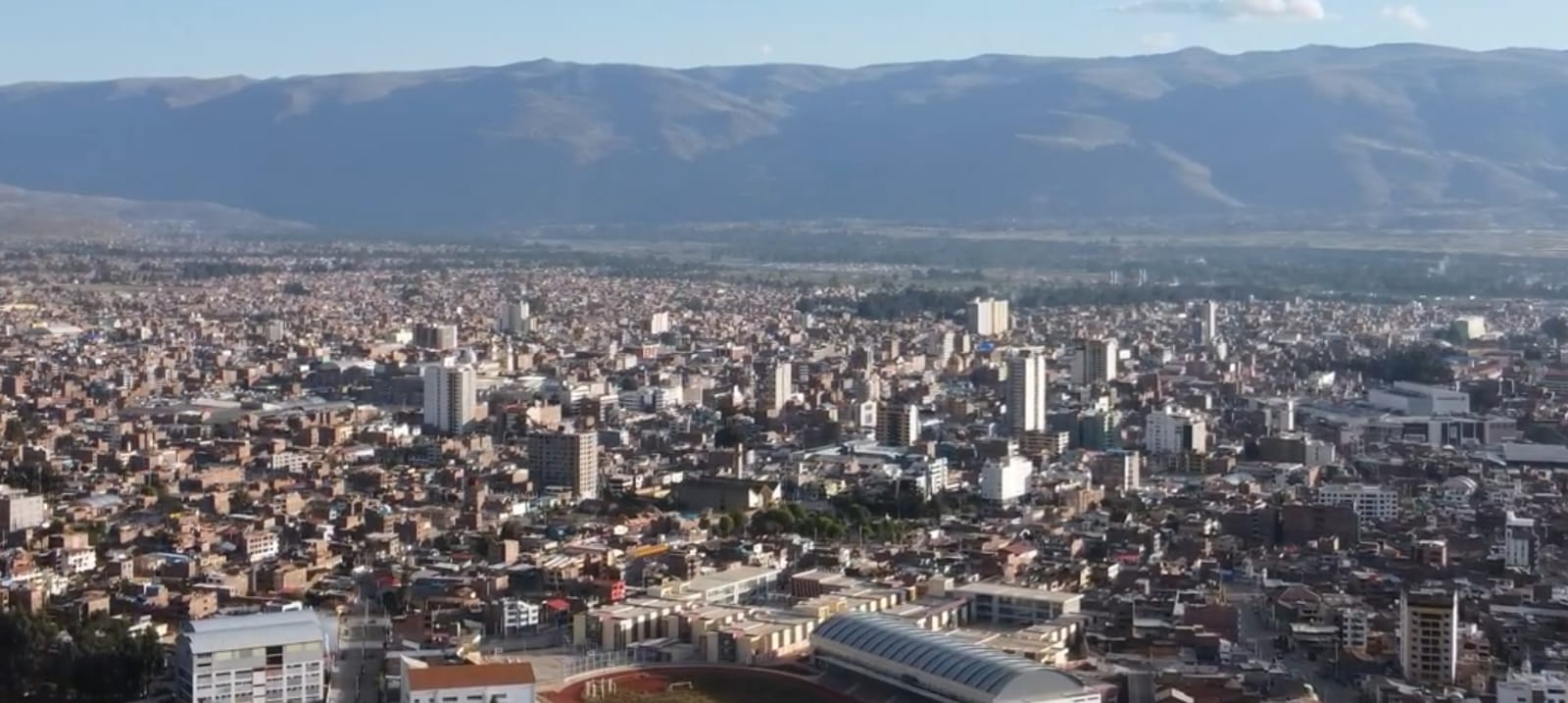
- Plaza Constitución, Cathedral of Huancayo, Real Plaza Huancayo, Wanka Identity Park, Administration and Government Pavilion of the National University of the Center of Peru and Panoramic.

- Flag Coat of arms
- Nickname: "La Ciudad Incontrastable" (The Uncontrastable City)
- Location within Peru Location within South America Location within Earth
- Coordinates: 12°4′S 75°13′W
- Country: Peru
- Region: Junin
- Province: Huancayo
- District: Huancayo
- Founded: 1 June 1572

Government
  - Type: Municipal government
  - Mayor: Henry López Cantorín

Area
  - Total: 319.41 km^{2} (123.32 sq mi)
- Elevation: 3,259 m (10,692 ft)

Population (2017)
  - Total: 456,250
  - Estimate (2015): 364,725
  - Density: 1,428.4/km^{2} (3,699.6/sq mi)
- Time zone: UTC-5 (PET)
  - Summer (DST): UTC-5 (PET)
- Area code: 64
- Website: www.munihuancayo.gob.pe

Huancayo (Spanish pronunciation: [waŋˈkaʝo]; in Wanka Quechua: Wankayu, '(place) with a (sacred) rock', Quechua pronunciation: [waŋˈkajuː]) is the capital of the Junín Region and Huancayo Province, in the central highlands of Peru, in the Mantaro Valley and is crossed by the Shullcas, Chilca and Mantaro rivers. It was founded as a reduction by the name Santísima Trinidad de Huancayo on 1 June 1572, by Don Jerónimo de Silva, a Spanish conquistador. It is the fifth largest city in Peru, with a population of over 500,000 and is among the highest cities in Peru, with an altitude of 3,256 meters (10,692 feet) above sea level. It is considered the economic and social center of central Peru.

The Huanca people largely inhabited the area even before the Inca Empire at around 500 BC. They would later form the so-called Huanca kingdom.They were incorporated into the Inca Empire, becoming a stopping point along the Qhapaq Ñan, the section that runs through the city, which today is called Calle Real. Upon the arrival of the Spanish conquistadors notably Francisco Pizarro, the Huancas became faithful and staunch allies, participating in the capture of Cusco and the battles against the Incas of Vilcabamba.

== Etymology ==
The word Wankayuq is composed of the root wanka ('stone') and the derivative suffix -yuq ('the one who has'), a common morpheme in other toponyms of the Mantaro Valley. In that sense, a translation of the name would be "The Place of the Stone." This theory is accompanied by an oral tradition of the city that pointed out that in the location of the current Huamanmarca square, there existed at the beginning of the population an oval stone of considerable dimensions. Currently there is no such rock or evidence of its location.

== History ==
=== Pre-Columbian era ===
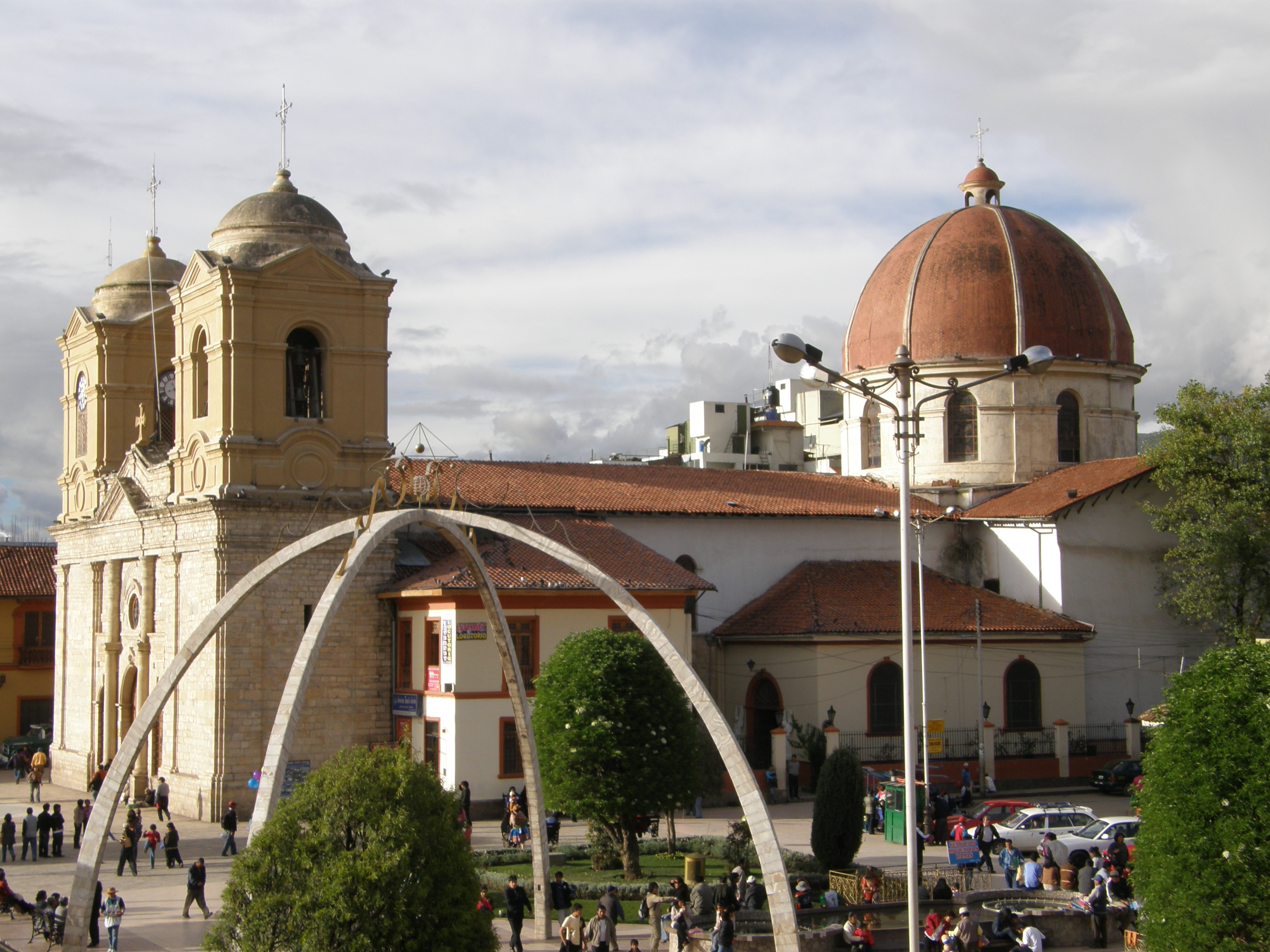
Huancayo Cathedral

The area was originally inhabited by the Huancas. At around 500 BC, they were incorporated into the Wari Empire. Despite efforts to defend its independence, the Huancas were eventually subdued by the Inca leader Pachacutec in 1460 and the region was incorporated into the Inca Empire. It subsequently became a notable stopping point along the Inca Camino Real.

It was the Wari culture, whose main center is located in what is now the Department of Ayacucho that first began its expansion northward in the sixth century. The peoples of the central area of the valley were part of what became known as the Wari empire. From that time are the remains of the Huari village of Huarivilca. The fall of this empire was followed by the rise of another culture, the Inca culture. Around 1460, under the rule of the Incan emperor, Pachacuti, the Incas took control of the region and annexed it to their empire. The resistance of the Huancas, as well as the policy of acculturation of the Incas (based on the introduction of their religion and language), caused that in this area there was no peaceful coexistence but rather an area of constant convulsion and repression by the Cusco people. However, despite the resistance of the fortress of Watury, the valley was exploited for its fertility and the area was used as one of the main passes of the Inca trail that headed north towards the cities of Cajamarca and Quito.

Around 1460, under the rule of the Incan emperor, Pachacuti, the Incas took control of the region and annexed it to their empire. The resistance of the Huancas, as well as the policy of acculturation of the Incas (based on the introduction of their religion and language), caused that in this area there was no peaceful coexistence but rather an area of constant convulsion and repression by the Cusco people. However, despite the resistance of the fortress of Watury, the valley was exploited for its fertility and the area was used as one of the main passes of the Inca trail that headed north towards the cities of Cajamarca and Quito.

=== Colonial era ===
After the Spanish colonization in 1534, Huancayo was overshadowed by Jauja, a provisional capital of Peru, until Lima took over that role, as established by the conquistador Francisco Pizarro. In 1570, the viceroy Francisco de Toledo established the site as the center of his encomienda Guancayo. The town was officially established on 1 June 1572 with the title of Santísima Trinidad de Huancayo. In 1813, Huancayo celebrated the promulgation of the Constitution of Cadiz, changing the name of "Plaza del Comercio" to "Plaza de la Constitución".

The main temple (now the Cathedral of Huancayo) was built on land donated by notable neighbors. Its construction began on March 18, 1799 and was completed on March 18, 1831. The square where the cathedral is located used to ge called "Plaza del Comercio" but was renamed "Plaza Constitución" in homage to the oath that was taken in Huancayo in 1813 of the signing of the Liberal Constitution of Cadiz in 1812.

General Simón Bolívar arrived in this valley in August 1824, already Supreme Dictator of Peru. During his stay, he rewarded many heroes and gave recognition to the patriotic soldiers, who helped achieve the independence of the different South American states. He also expelled the Franciscan friars from the convent of Ocopa from the region, considering them "recalcitrant royalists".

=== Republican era ===
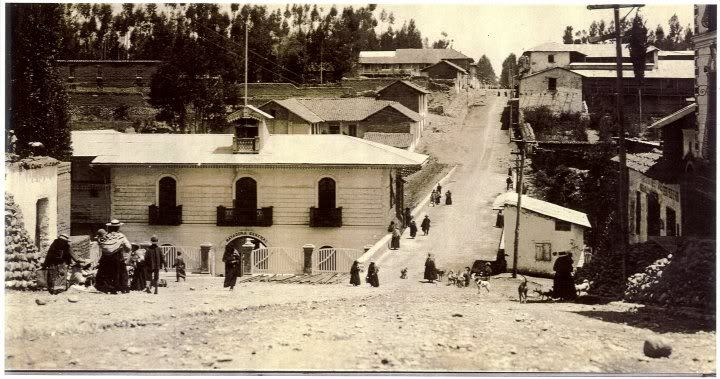
Huancayo during the early 20th century

During the war for independence, Huancayo was liberated on 20 November 1820. Construction on the cathedral commenced in 1831. The accord was made law in Huancayo in 1854, when Peru officially ended slavery. There is a statue in the Plaza Constitución commemorating this.

In the 1980s, Huancayo, like the entire central region of the country, was a center of anti-subversive struggle against the terrorist organizations of the Shining Path and the Túpac Amaru Revolutionary Movement. In the city, there were constant clashes between the National Police of Peru, the Peruvian Armed Forces and these two factions, which even confronted each other. The east of the city was under the control of Sendero while the west of the city was under the control of the MRTA. Among the most notorious attacks during this time was the assassination of the acting mayor Saúl Muñoz Menacho on July 24, 1984 by former Mayor Félix Ortega Arce on March 29, 1987 and the assassination attempt on January 22, 1989, against the then acting mayor, Ricardo Bohórquez Hernández.

In 1988, the leader of the MRTA, Víctor Polay Campos, was captured in the "Plaza Huamanmarca". Starting in 1992, as in the rest of the country, the Peruvian National Police and the Armed Forces managed to dismantle the subversive movement. Finally, on July 14, 1999, the last leader of the Shining Path, Oscar Ramírez Durand, alias Feliciano, was captured in the town of Cochas, an annex of the district of El Tambo.

=== Present ===
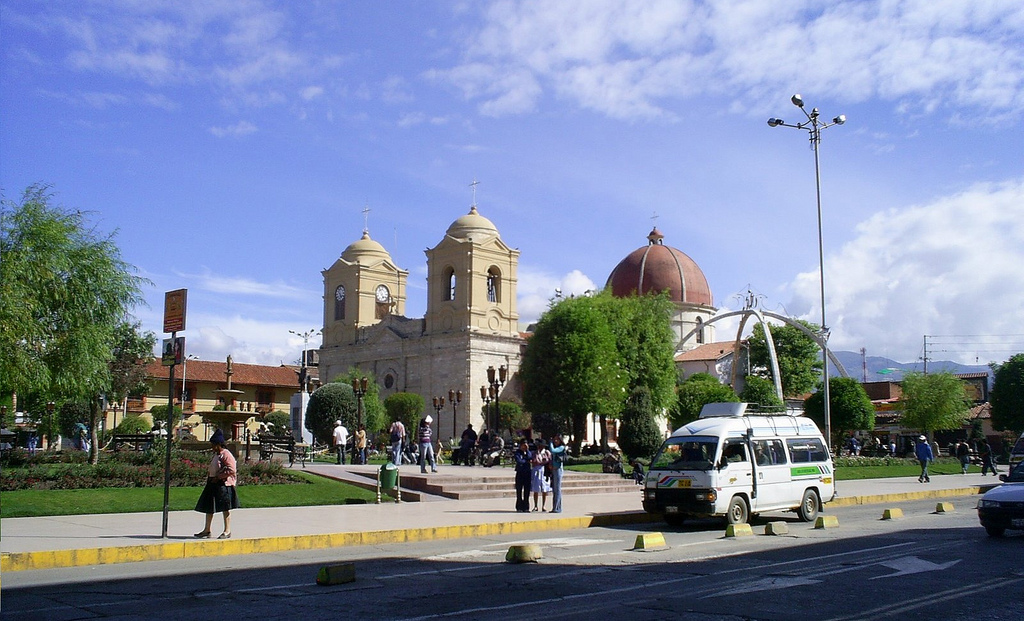
Plaza de la Constitución

Today, in addition to its importance as a center of commerce, Huancayo is known for the crafts and the many festivals of the surrounding towns. Having rapidly expanded in recent decades, it has few remaining colonial buildings. Currently, the cityscape is dominated by modern construction.

The city's rise began with the construction of a central railway Callao-La Oroya in 1908 and later extended from Lima to Huancayo in the early 1930s. The railway connection between Lima and Huancayo, introduced new ways of transporting goods. The railway's new avenues for transport contributed to the city's economic and population growth. Population growth was mostly present in Tambo and Chilica, two suburban districts near the highways. Furthermore, population growth between 1981 and 2007 was a result of in-migration due to terrorist attacks of Sendero Luminoso. People from highlands and amazonian lowlands sought refuge in Andean cities such as Huancayo.

== Geography ==
=== Location ===
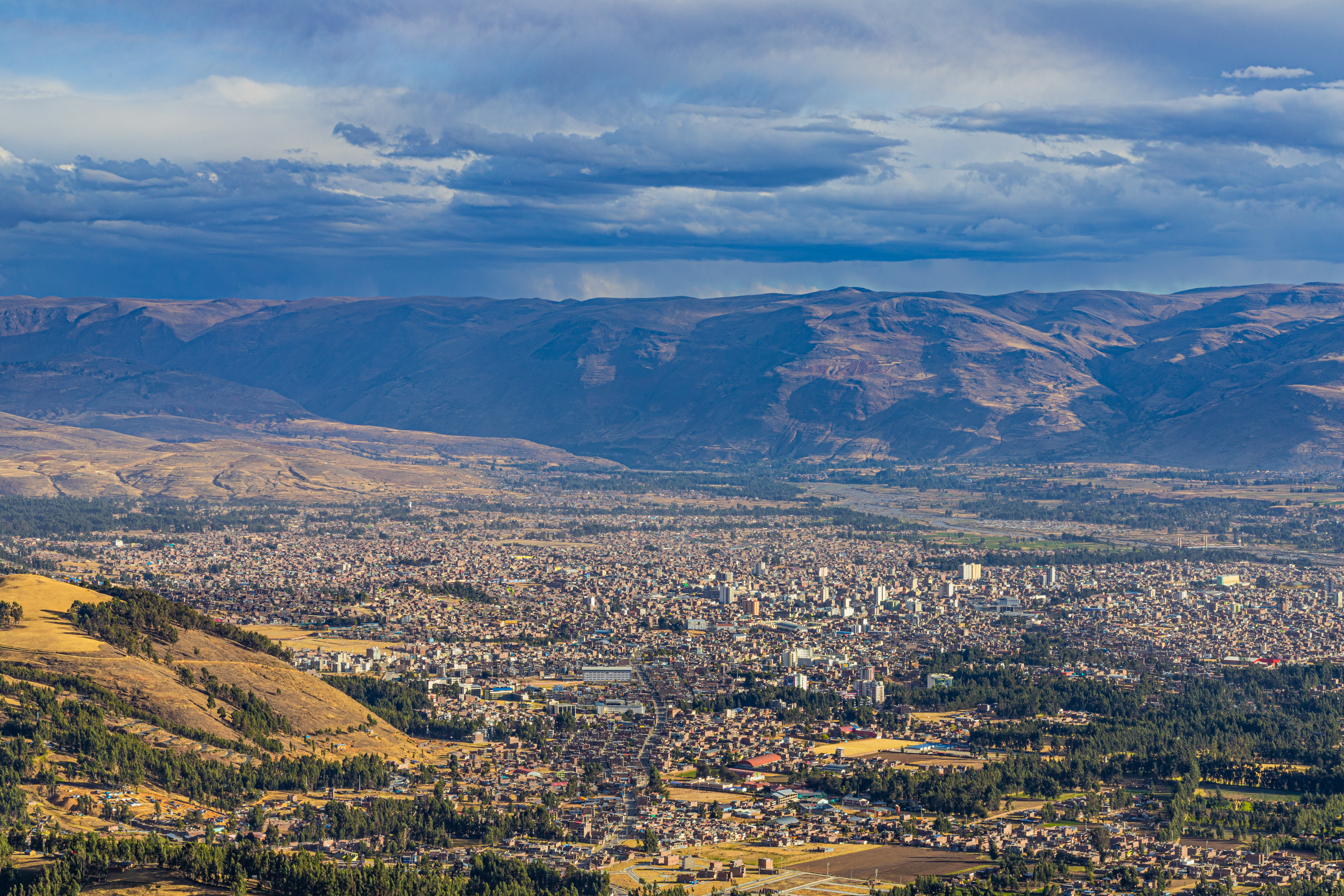
City of Huancayo in 2021

Huancayo is located in the Huancayo Province, serving as the province's capital. Situated in the Mantaro Valley at an altitude of 3,271 meters, it belongs to the Quechua region. Depending on delimitation, the agglomeration has a population between 340,000 and 380,000 and is the fifth most populous city of the country. Huancayo is the cultural and commercial center of the whole central Peruvian Andes area. Huancayo Metropolitano is made up of seven districts that form the urban center of the Junín region. This region is considered central Peru's economic and social hub.

=== Climate ===
Huancayo has a subtropical highland climate (Köppen: Cwb) characterized by mild days, cold nights, and distinct wet and dry seasons.

The total annual precipitation is 660 millimeters (26.0 inches). Huancayo receives the majority of its precipitation during the wet season, which spans from November to March. The dry season, from May to September, sees significantly reduced precipitation, with June and July being the driest months, receiving only around 5 mm of precipitation.

Daytime temperatures are relatively constant throughout the year, with all months having average high temperatures close to 20 °C (68 °F). The dry season has significantly colder nights than the wet season, with temperatures regularly dropping to freezing, while low temperatures average above 6 °C (43 °F) during the wet season.

Climate data for Huancayo (Santa Ana Experimental Agrarian Station) (1991–2020)
Month	Jan	Feb	Mar	Apr	May	Jun	Jul	Aug	Sep	Oct	Nov	Dec	Year
Mean daily maximum °C (°F)	19.4 (66.9)	19.0 (66.2)	18.9 (66.0)	19.9 (67.8)	21.0 (69.8)	20.5 (68.9)	20.4 (68.7)	20.8 (69.4)	20.7 (69.3)	20.8 (69.4)	21.4 (70.5)	20.0 (68.0)	20.2 (68.4)
Mean daily minimum °C (°F)	6.5 (43.7)	6.7 (44.1)	6.4 (43.5)	4.5 (40.1)	2.1 (35.8)	0.1 (32.2)	0.4 (32.7)	1.2 (34.2)	3.7 (38.7)	5.2 (41.4)	5.4 (41.7)	6.3 (43.3)	4.1 (39.4)
Average precipitation mm (inches)	107.4 (4.23)	120.7 (4.75)	96.2 (3.79)	47.0 (1.85)	12.5 (0.49)	5.4 (0.21)	5.5 (0.22)	11.1 (0.44)	30.4 (1.20)	53.9 (2.12)	67.0 (2.64)	103.3 (4.07)	660.4 (26.00)
Source: NOAA

== Demographics ==
According to the National Census of 2007, the three main districts of Huancayo have a total population of about 340,000. However, the continuous settlement area has already reached periurban districts, resulting in the agglomeration's population being at least 380,000 people. Amerindian and Mestizos (Amerindian and Spanish ancestry) are the two largest ethnic groups in the city. Asian (mainly descendants of Japanese and Chinese immigrants) and European descendants are important minority groups.

Municipalities of the city	Area km^{2}	Population censo 2007(hab)	Population under 1 year-old Census 2007(hab)	Households (2007)	Density (inhabitants/km^{2})	Elevation msnm
Chilca	8,3 km^{2}	77.392*	1.358*	17.509	9.324,33	3.275 msnm
El Tambo	73,56 km^{2}	146.847*	2.365*	36.982	1.996,28	3.260 msnm
Huancayo	237,55 km^{2}	112.054*	1,789*	27.552	471,70	3.249 msnm
Total	319,41 km^{2}	336.293*	5.512*	82.043	1.052,85	—
*Data from the census taken by the INEI

== Government ==
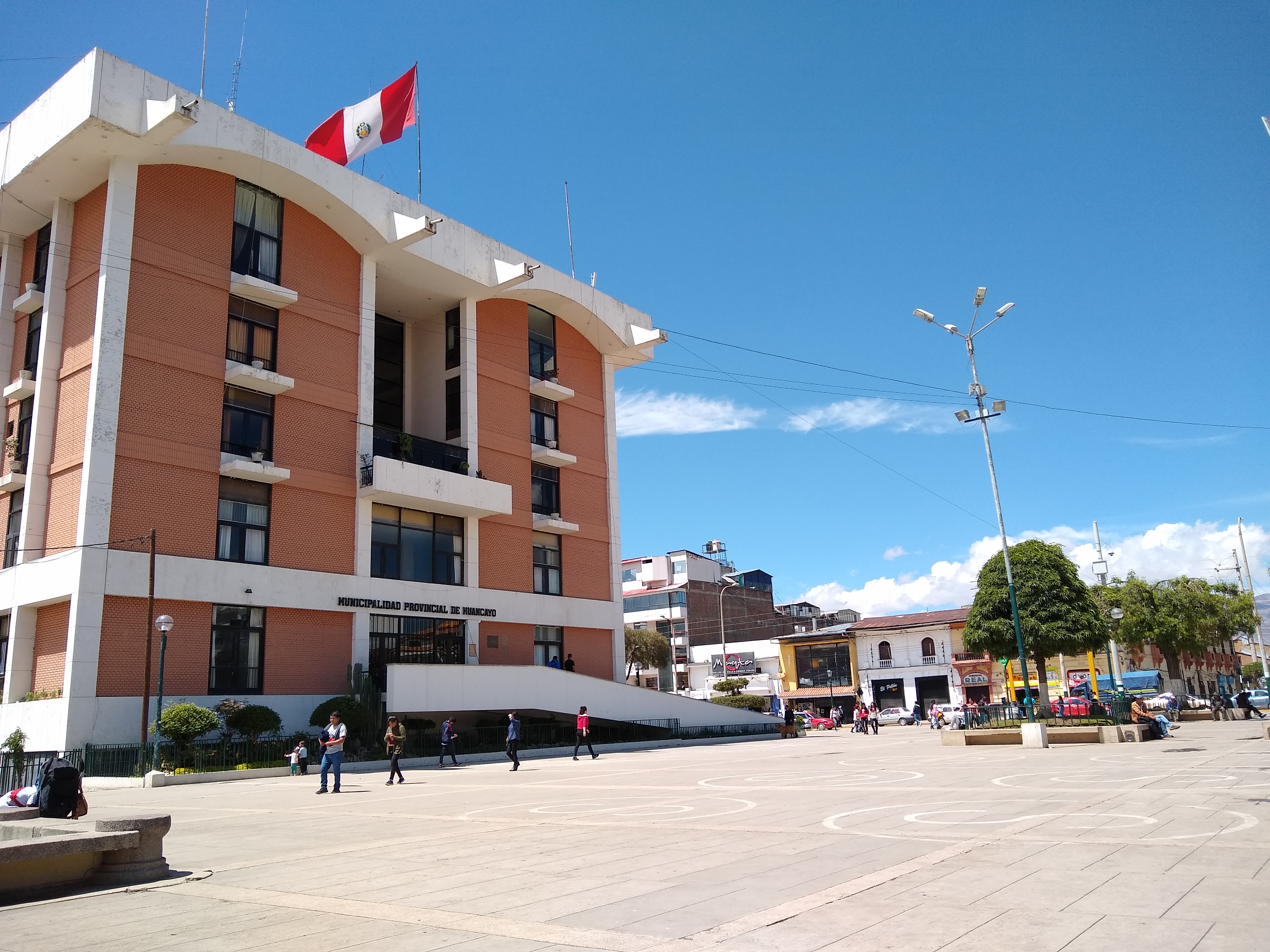
Huancayo Municipality building

=== Provincial government ===
The city, as the capital of the province of the same name, is governed by the Huancayo Province, which has jurisdiction over the entire territory of the province. There is no authority restricted to the city. In this regard, the district municipalities of El Tambo, Pilcomayo, Huancán, Sapallanga, San Jerónimo, San Agustín, Sicaya and Chilca also have competence in matters relating to their own districts.

=== Regional government ===
The city, as the departmental capital, is the seat of the Regional Government of Junín. It also has a prefect with political powers at the departmental level. Finally, it is also the headquarters of the different regional directorates of the ministries that make up the public administration.

=== Judicial function ===
Huancayo is the seat of the Superior Court of Justice of Junín, the governing body of the Judicial District of Junín. According to the country's judicial organization, there are eight magistrates' courts (two in the district of El Tambo and one in San Jerónimo, four in the district of Huancayo, and one in Chilca), seventeen specialized courts (four family, five civil, seven criminal and one labor courts) and six higher courts (three criminal and three mixed).

== Education ==
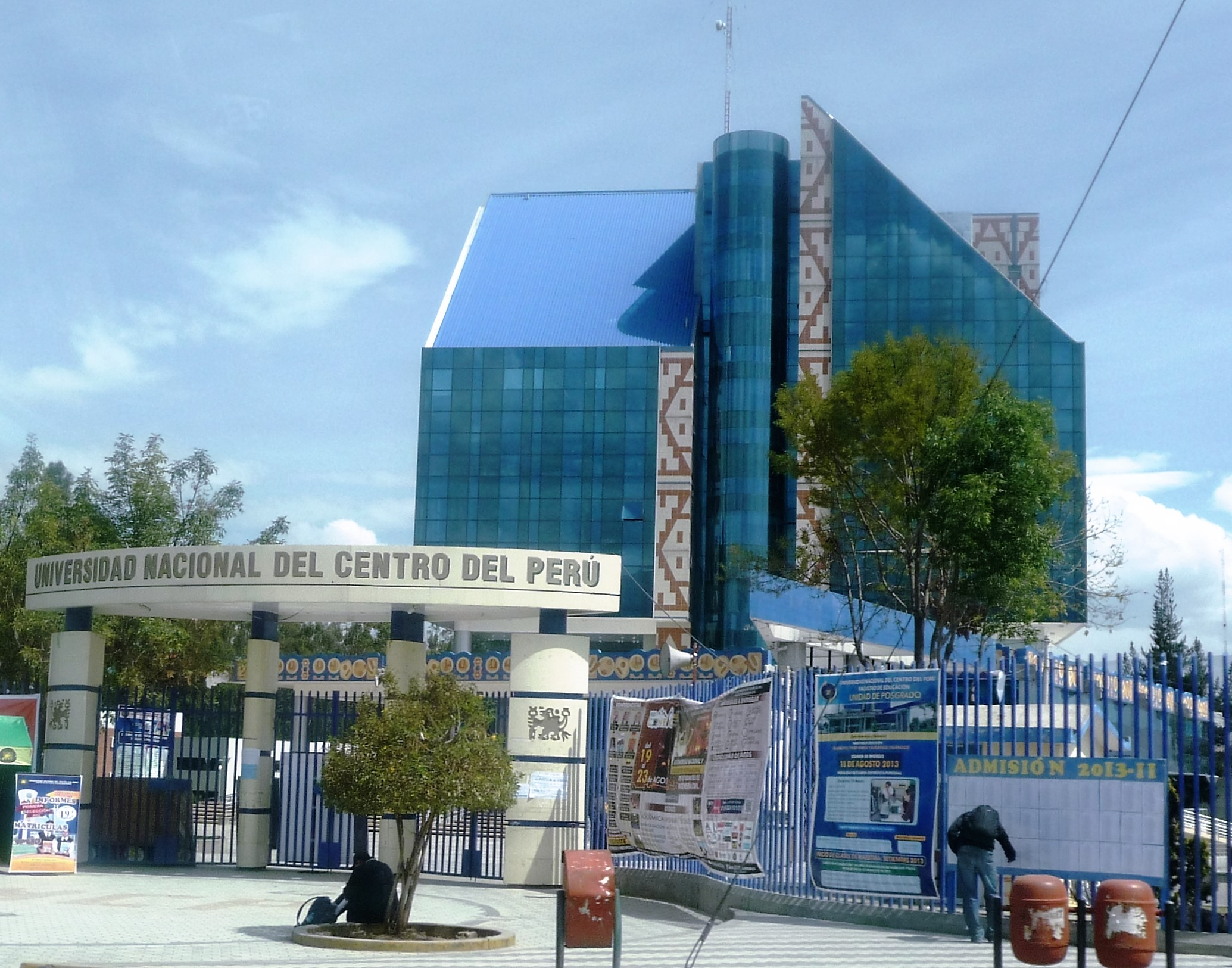
Universidad Nacional del Centro del Peru

There are a total of 248 early education centres in the city; of which 121 are located in the district of El Tambo (34 public and 87 private), 96 in the district of Huancayo and 31 in the district of Chilca (10 public and 21 private). At the primary level, there are 234 educational centres in the city; of which 107 are located in the district of El Tambo (32 public and 75 private), 100 are located in the district of Huancayo (28 public and 72 private) and 27 in the district of Chilca (9 public and 18 private).

=== Local universities ===
- Universidad Nacional del Centro del Peru (UNCP)
- Universidad Peruana Los Andes (UPLA)
- Universidad Continental (UC)
- Universidad Franklin Roosevelt (UFR)

=== Branches of other Peruvian universities ===
- Universidad Alas Peruanas (UAP)
- Universidad Los Angeles de Chimbote (ULADECH)
- Universidad Nacional Mayor de San Marcos (UNMSM)
- Universidad Nacional Daniel Alcides Carrión (UNDAC)
- Universidad de Huanuco (UDH)

=== Language institutes ===
- Instituto Cultural Peruano Británico
- Instituto Cultural Peruano Norteamericano – Región Centro (ICPNA)
- Alianza Francesa de Huancayo (French Alliance, AF)

== Culture ==
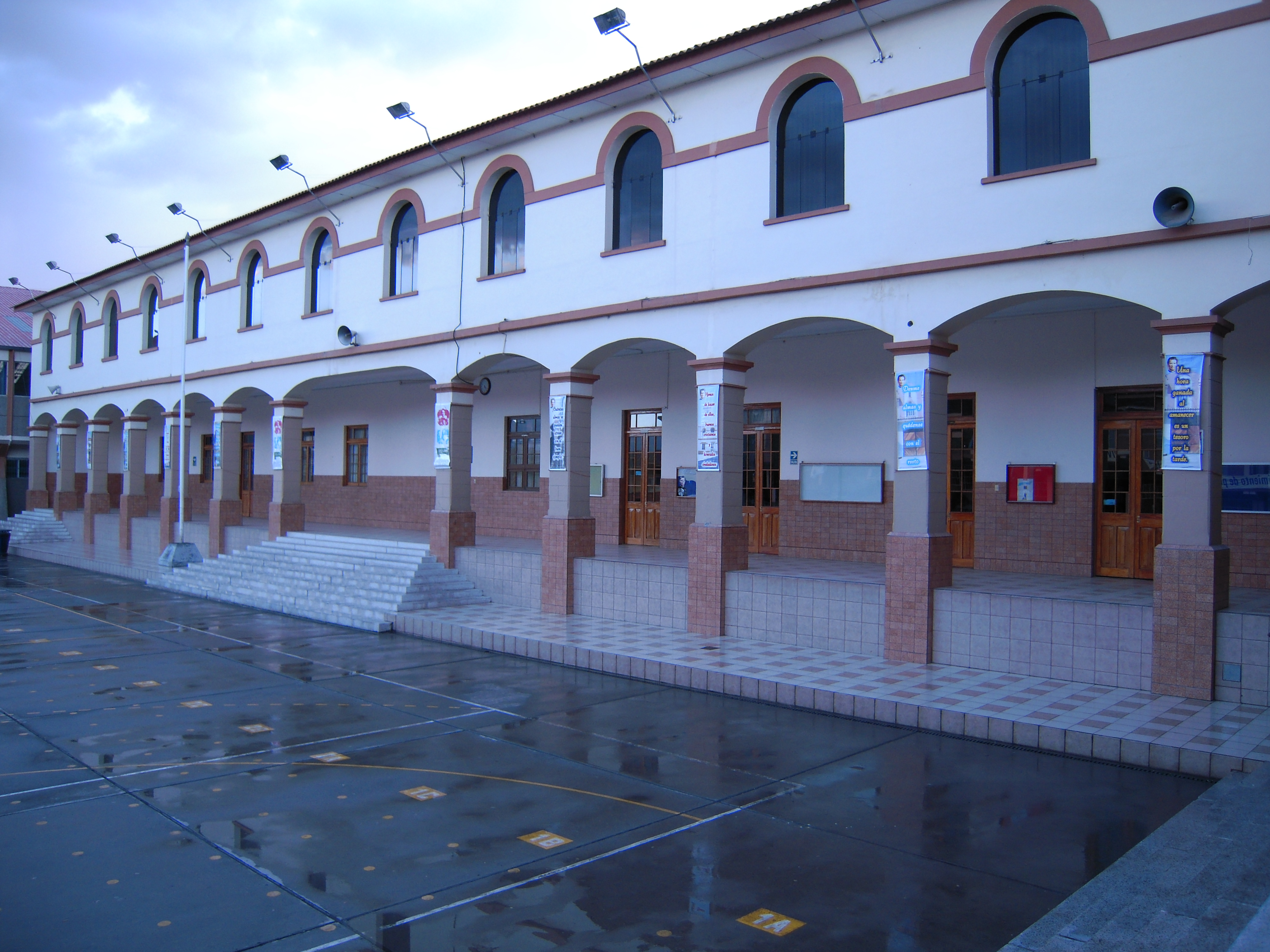
Vicente Rasetto Museum

=== Art ===
The work of the Huancaíno painter Guillermo Guzmán Manzaneda is the most popular and famous in the city.

=== Museums ===
The following is a list of museums in Huancayo:

- Vicente Rasetto Salesian Museum
- Catalina Huanca Museum of Archaeology
- Museum and archaeological remains of Huarihuilca
- Anthropological Museum of Andean Culture - UNCP

=== Cuisine ===
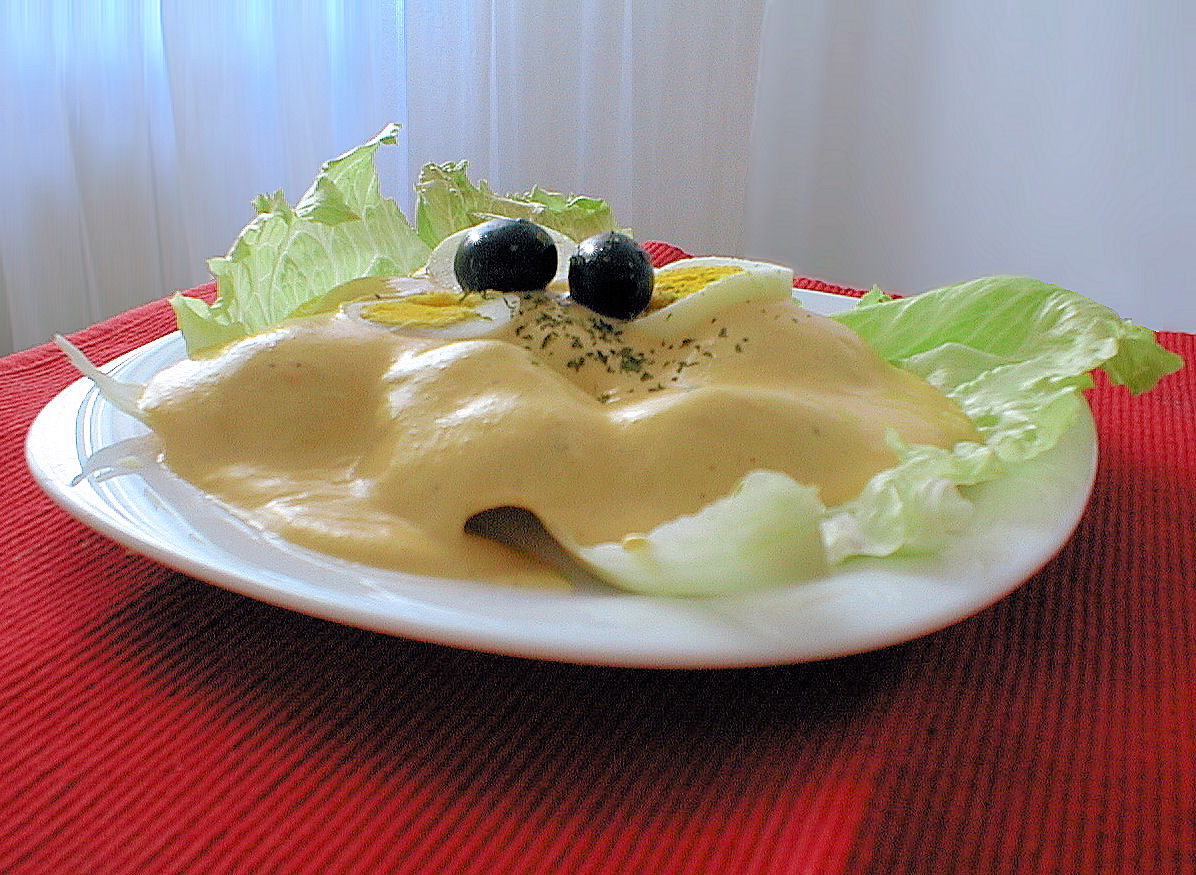
Papa a la huancaína

Papa a la huancaína is the most famous dish from Huancayo and one of the most famous in the country. It is a yellow cream over fresh cheese or cooked potatoes, hard boiled eggs, black olives and chili peppers. Another popular dish is cuy, guinea pig, and trout ceviche.

=== Sport ===
Association football (soccer) volleyball, and long-distance running are the most popular sports in Huancayo. Sport Huancayo is the city's largest club, participating in the Peruvian Primera División. Huancayo's largest stadium is Estadio Huancayo, which has a capacity of 20,000 and is home to various sports clubs. The stadium hosts the Marathon de los Andes every year. Several Peruvian athletes that participate in the Olympic Games are from Huancayo. Volleyball is another popular sport. Huancayo's largest arena is the Coliseo Wanka.

== Transport ==
=== Road ===
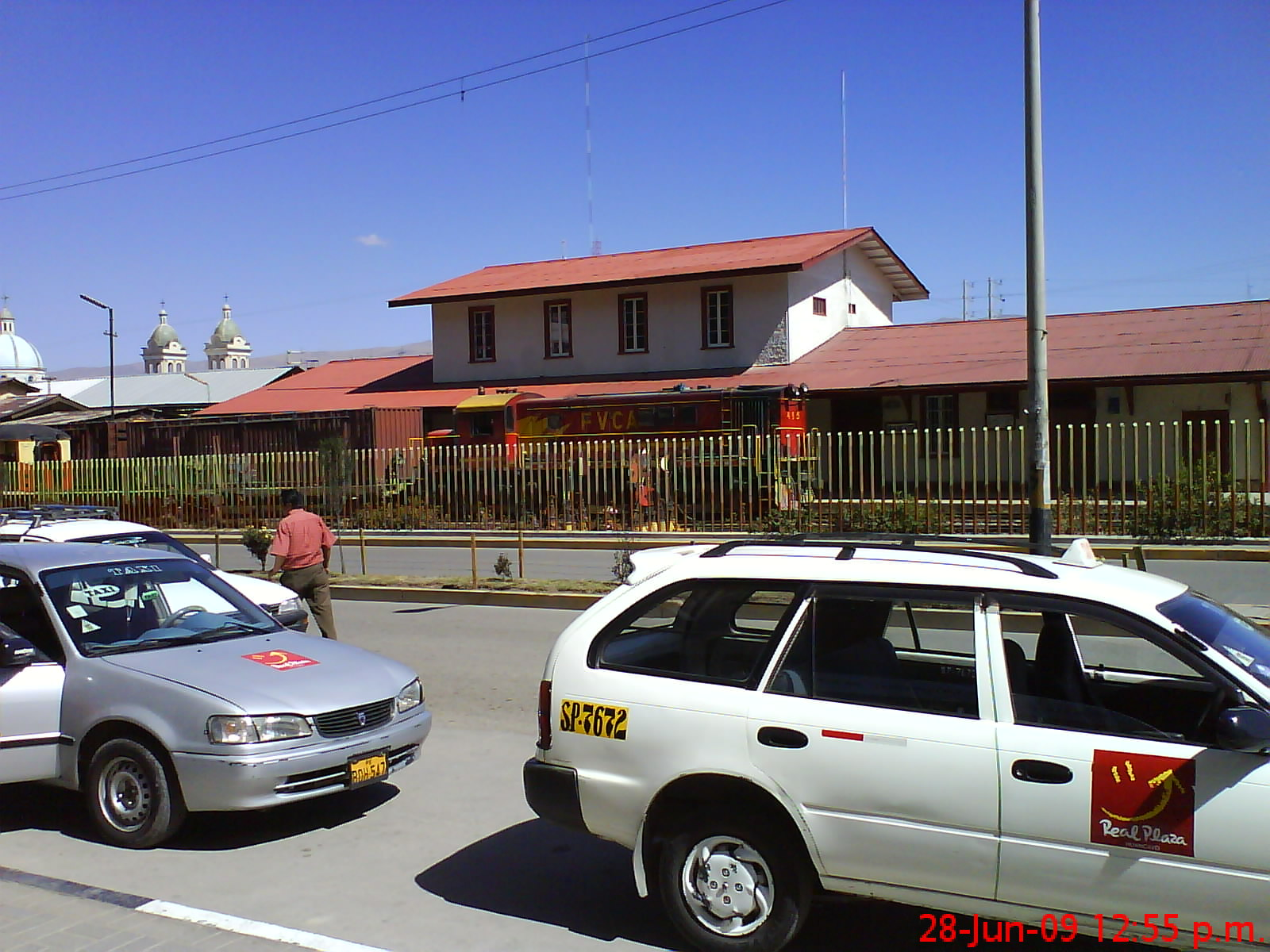
Huancayo Rail Station

Huancayo has transportation connections by road and rail. To travel by road, the Carretera Central links Huancayo with La Oroya and Lima, which generally takes seven to eight hours. Multiple bus carriers operate between Lima and Huancayo daily.

=== Air ===
The Francisco Carle Airport at Jauja offers daily connections to Lima and is located 45 minutes via car from Huancayo. Current airlines include LATAM Peru, Sky Airline Peru and JetSmart Peru.

=== Rail ===
The Ferrocarril Central Andino enables transport by rail. Huancayo was a break-of-gauge from 914 mm (3 ft) gauge to 1,435 mm (4 ft 8 1/2 in) gauge for the 147 km (91 mi) extension to Huancavelica. In 2009, this line was being standardised. There was a plan (Metro Wanka) to use the railway line as a local metro; however, this never came to fruition.

== Notable people ==
- Enrique Bernardo (1980–), tenor and pianist
- Víctor Alberto Gil Mallma (1930–1975), musician
- Damaris Mallma Porras (born 1986), Peruvian folk singer
- Rodolfo Cerrón Palomino (born 1940), linguist
- Juan Parra del Riego (1894–1925), poet
- Josué Sánchez (born 1945), painter
- Elliot Túpac, muralist and lettering artist

== See also ==
- Wanka (disambiguation)
- Plaza El Coliseo, bullfighting stadium
- Papa a la Huancaína (literally, Huancayo style potatoes), a Peruvian dish
