= Hatunqucha (Junín) =

Lake in the Waytapallana mountain range in the Andes of Peru

- Location within Peru
- Location: Peru; Junín Region, Huancayo Province, Huancayo District
- Coordinates: 11°56′7″S 75°2′4″W

Hatunqucha (Quechua hatun (in Bolivia always jatun) big, large qucha lake, "big lake", Hispanicized names Cocha Grande, Cochagrande, Jatunccocha, Jatuncocha) is a lake in the Waytapallana mountain range in the Andes of Peru. It is located in the Junín Region, Huancayo Province, Huancayo District Hatunqucha lies in the southern part of the range, near the mountain Yana Uqsha. West of Hatunqucha there is a little lake named Yana Uqsha. The lake south of Hatunqucha is called Qarwaqucha (Quechua for yellowish lake", Hispanicized Carhuacocha).
