= Pariahuanca District, Huancayo =

Coordinates: 11.9997°S 74.9424°W

Pariahuanca Parya Wank'a
- District
- Interactive map of Pariahuanca
- Country: Peru
- Region: Junín
- Province: Huancayo
- Founded: January 2, 1857
- Capital: Pariahuanca

Government
  - Mayor: Oscar Ruben Janampa Cotera

Area
  - Total: 617.5 km^{2} (238.4 sq mi)
- Elevation: 2,070 m (6,790 ft)

Population (2005 census)
  - Total: 8,196
  - Density: 13.27/km^{2} (34.38/sq mi)
- Time zone: UTC-5 (PET)
- UBIGEO: 120124

Pariahuanca (from Quechua Parya Wank'a) is one of twenty-eight districts of the Huancayo Province in Peru.

== Geography ==
The Waytapallana mountain range traverses the district. The highest peak of the district is Waytapallana at 5,557 m (18,232 ft). Other mountains are listed below:

- Anchhi
- Lasu Tumi
- Millpu Q'asa
- Puka Qucha
- Pukara
- Puywan
- Qalla Q'asa
- Quchan Quchan
- Quchas
- Sura Qucha
- Suyt'u Kancha
- Talwis
- Tuqtu Q'asa
- Ullquyuq
- Utkhuyuq
- Warmi Qucha
- Wayanay
- Waytapallana (Aychana)
- Winsu

== Ethnic groups ==
The people in the district are mainly indigenous citizens of Quechua descent. Quechua is the language which the majority of the population (58.38%) learnt to speak in childhood, 41.21% of the residents started speaking using the Spanish language (2007 Peru Census).
