= Marairazo =

Mountain in Peru

- Location within Peru

Highest point
- Elevation: 4,943 m (16,217 ft)
- Coordinates: 11°37′29″S 75°12′41″W

Geography
- Location: Peru, Junín Region
- Parent range: Andes, Huaytapallana

Marairazo (possibly from Quechua maray batan or grindstone; to tear down, to knock down, rasu snow, ice) is a mountain in the northern sector of the Huaytapallana mountain range in the Andes of Peru, about 4,943 metres (16,217 ft) high. It is situated in the Junín Region, Concepción Province, Comas District, and in the Jauja Province, in the districts of Apata and Monobamba.
