= Lake Ancapuachanan =

Lake in Peru

- Location within Peru
- Location: Junín Region
- Coordinates: 11°53′48″S 75°4′14″W
- Basin countries: Peru

Lake Ancapuachanan (possibly from Quechua anka black-chested buzzard-eagle or eagle, wacha birth, to give birth -p, -na, -n suffixes) is a small lake in the Huaytapallana mountain range in Peru. It is located in the Junín Region, Huancayo Province, El Tambo District. Lake Ancapuachanan is situated north of the lake named Chuspicocha and southwest of Mount Chuspi.
