= Puywan =

Mountain in Peru

- Location within Peru

Highest point
- Elevation: 5,100 m (16,700 ft)
- Coordinates: 11°51′21″S 75°2′40″W

Geography
- Location: Peru, Junín Region
- Parent range: Andes, Waytapallana

Puywan (Quechua for heart of an animal, Hispanicized spelling Puihuan) is a mountain in the northern sector of the Waytapallana mountain range in the Andes of Peru, about 5,100 metres (16,732 ft) high. It is situated in the Junín Region, Huancayo Province, Pariahuanca District, and in the Concepción Province, Comas District. Puywan lies southeast of T'illu and northeast of Ch'uspi.
