= Lasu Tumi =

Mountain in Peru

- Location within Peru

Highest point
- Elevation: 5,200 m (17,100 ft)
- Coordinates: 11°56′40″S 74°49′39″W

Geography
- Location: Peru, Junín Region
- Parent range: Andes

Lasu Tumi (local Quechua lasu (rasu) snow, ice, mountain with snow, tumi (historical) knife, "mountain knife", also spelled Lazo Tumi) is a mountain in Peru, about 5,200 m (17,100 ft) high. It is located in the Junín Region, Huancayo Province, Pariahuanca District. It lies northeast of a mountain named Ututuyuq (Quechua ututu a small viper, -yuq a suffix, "the one with the ututu", erroneously also spelled Litutoyo).

Ututuyuq (Ututuyoc) is also the name of an intermittent river which originates near the mountain. It is an affluent of the Lampa River.
