= Yana Ucsha (Junin) =

Mountain in Peru

Highest point
- Elevation: 5,300 m (17,400 ft)

Geography
- Location: Peru, Junín Region, Huancayo Province
- Parent range: Andes, Huaytapallana

Yana Ucsha (possibly from Quechua yana black, very dark, uqsha (locally), uqsa high altitude grass, Hispanicized spellings Yana Ucsha, Yanaucsha, Yanauscha, Yanahucsha, also Yanauksha) is a ridge in the Huaytapallana mountain range in the Andes of Peru, about 5,300 metres (17,388 ft) high. It is also the name of a small lake at its feet at 11°55′58″S 75°2′30″W.

The ridge is situated in the southern part of the main sector of the range, south of Huaytapallana. It lies in the Junín Region, Huancayo Province, Huancayo District.

Beside the lake Yana Ucsha there are two larger lakes nearby named Jatuncocha and Carhuacocha.
