= Comas District, Concepción =

Comas District
- District
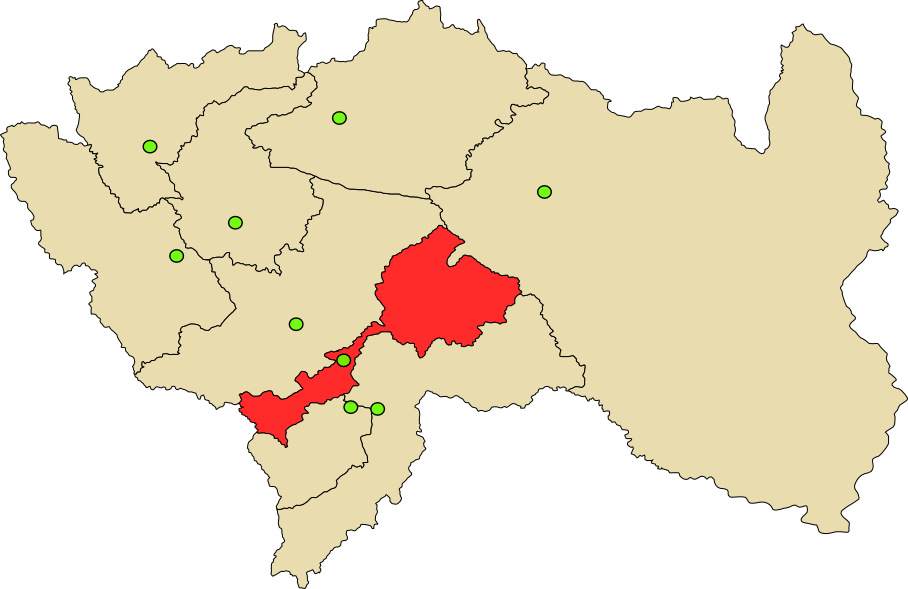
- Interactive map of Comas District
- Country: Peru
- Region: Junín
- Province: Concepción
- Capital: Comas

Government
  - Mayor: Jorge Luis Garcia Porras

Area
  - Total: 825.29 km^{2} (318.65 sq mi)
- Elevation: 3,335 m (10,942 ft)

Population (2005 census)
  - Total: 7,952
  - Density: 9.635/km^{2} (24.96/sq mi)
- Time zone: UTC-5 (PET)
- UBIGEO: 120206

Comas District is one of fifteen districts of the Concepción Province in Peru.

== Geography ==
The Waytapallana mountain range traverses the province. One of the highest peaks of the district is Putkaqucha at 5,236 m (17,178 ft). Other mountains are listed below:

- Anchhi
- Anta K'uchu
- Ch'uspi
- Hatun Pata
- Kima Qucha
- Kimsa Uchku
- Kiswar
- Lipa Q'asa
- Luychu Kancha
- Llaksa Qucha
- Llant'a Pallaku
- Mach'ayniyuq
- Mamallayniyuq
- Marayrasu
- Mina Pata
- Mina Q'asa
- Muratayuq
- Pakaku
- Para K'uchu
- Pitita
- Puywan
- Qillqay
- Quchayuq
- Q'ara Chuku
- Saywa
- Silla Pata
- Tinki Qucha
- Tuku Mach'ay
- Tunsu
- T'asta Pata
- T'illu
- Utkhu Warqu
- Wamanripayuq
- Wari Pampa
- Warmi Sinqa
- Wayta Pallaku
- Waytapallana
- Yana Qucha
- Yanaqa
- Yawar Qucha

== Climate ==
Climate data for Comas, elevation 3,603 m (11,821 ft), (1991–2020)
Month	Jan	Feb	Mar	Apr	May	Jun	Jul	Aug	Sep	Oct	Nov	Dec	Year
Mean daily maximum °C (°F)	13.8 (56.8)	13.5 (56.3)	13.7 (56.7)	14.3 (57.7)	14.7 (58.5)	14.7 (58.5)	14.4 (57.9)	14.6 (58.3)	14.5 (58.1)	14.4 (57.9)	14.8 (58.6)	14.0 (57.2)	14.3 (57.7)
Mean daily minimum °C (°F)	5.2 (41.4)	5.5 (41.9)	5.3 (41.5)	4.5 (40.1)	3.5 (38.3)	2.4 (36.3)	2.0 (35.6)	2.4 (36.3)	3.4 (38.1)	4.4 (39.9)	4.4 (39.9)	4.9 (40.8)	4.0 (39.2)
Average precipitation mm (inches)	143.6 (5.65)	146.3 (5.76)	141.6 (5.57)	65.7 (2.59)	28.6 (1.13)	15.9 (0.63)	22.4 (0.88)	27.7 (1.09)	49.9 (1.96)	94.1 (3.70)	79.1 (3.11)	122.4 (4.82)	937.3 (36.89)
Source: National Meteorology and Hydrology Service of Peru

Climate data for Runatullo, Comas, elevation 3,473 m (11,394 ft), (1991–2020)
Month	Jan	Feb	Mar	Apr	May	Jun	Jul	Aug	Sep	Oct	Nov	Dec	Year
Mean daily maximum °C (°F)	13.3 (55.9)	13.1 (55.6)	13.3 (55.9)	13.3 (55.9)	13.5 (56.3)	13.0 (55.4)	12.8 (55.0)	13.2 (55.8)	13.2 (55.8)	13.5 (56.3)	14.0 (57.2)	13.4 (56.1)	13.3 (55.9)
Mean daily minimum °C (°F)	6.2 (43.2)	6.4 (43.5)	6.1 (43.0)	5.3 (41.5)	3.9 (39.0)	2.4 (36.3)	2.0 (35.6)	2.4 (36.3)	4.0 (39.2)	5.2 (41.4)	5.8 (42.4)	6.2 (43.2)	4.7 (40.4)
Average precipitation mm (inches)	166.7 (6.56)	187.6 (7.39)	155.8 (6.13)	75.8 (2.98)	42.2 (1.66)	21.2 (0.83)	40.5 (1.59)	35.2 (1.39)	59.8 (2.35)	102.8 (4.05)	97.5 (3.84)	163.8 (6.45)	1,148.9 (45.22)
Source: National Meteorology and Hydrology Service of Peru
