= Quilcas District =

Coordinates: 11.9381°S 75.2610°W

Quilcas
- District
- Coat of arms
- Interactive map of Quilcas
- Country: Peru
- Region: Junín
- Province: Huancayo
- Founded: May 27, 1952
- Capital: Quilcas

Government
  - Mayor: Idial Tiza Meza

Area
  - Total: 167.98 km^{2} (64.86 sq mi)
- Elevation: 3,330 m (10,930 ft)

Population (2005 census)
  - Total: 4,114
  - Density: 24.49/km^{2} (63.43/sq mi)
- Time zone: UTC-5 (PET)
- UBIGEO: 120128

Quilcas District is one of twenty-eight districts of the province Huancayo in Peru.

== See also ==
- Putkaqucha
- Waytapallana mountain range
