= Plaza El Coliseo (Trujillo) =

Bull-fighting stadium in Trujillo, Peru

Estadio Plaza El Coliseo is a bull-fighting stadium in Trujillo, La Libertad, Peru. The stadium holds 8,000 people.
