= Huaytapallana mountain range =

Mountain range in Peru

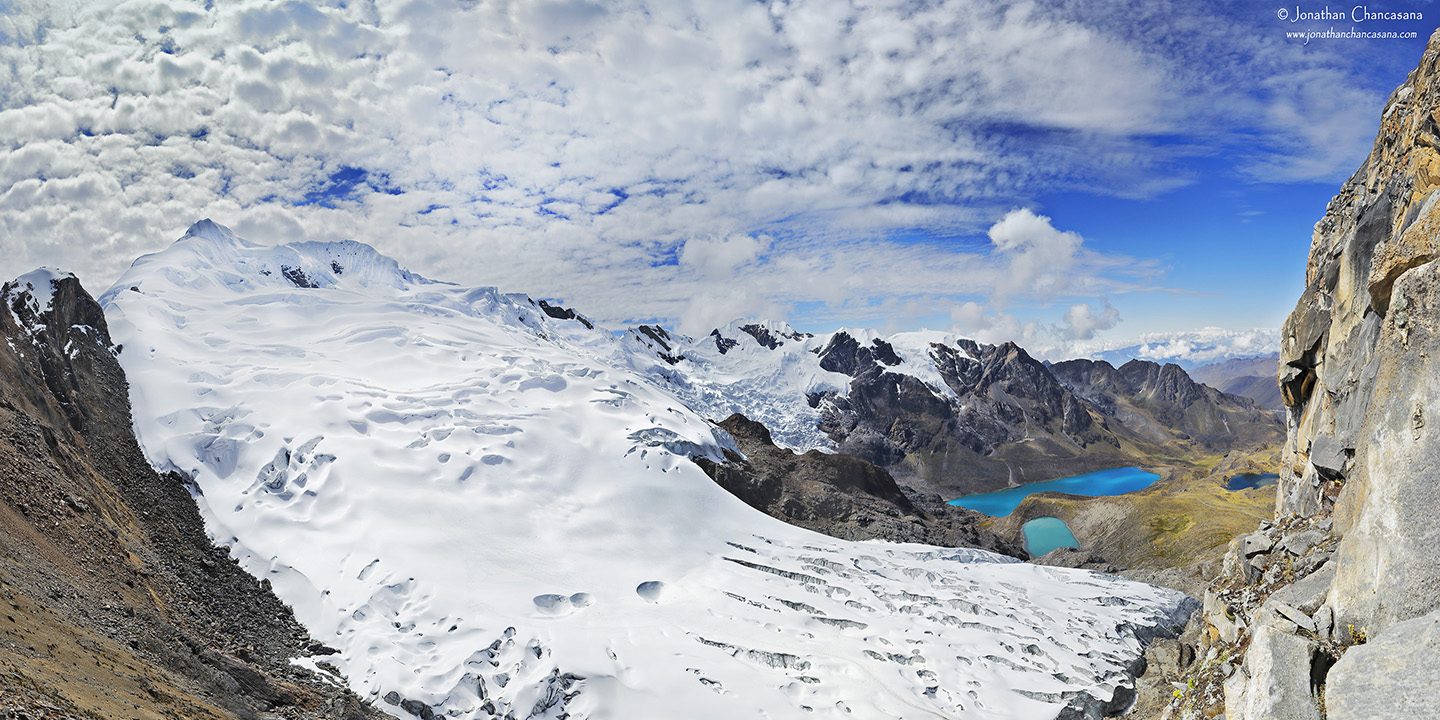
- Huaytapallana range as seen from the south

Highest point
- Peak: Huaytapallana
- Elevation: 5,557 m (18,232 ft)

Dimensions
- Length: 17 km (11 mi) N-S

Geography
- Location within Peru Location within South America
- Country: Peru
- Region: Junín Region
- Range coordinates: 11°54′21″S 75°03′09″W
- Parent range: Andes

The Huaytapallana mountain range (from Quechua wayta 'flower' and pallana '(place) where something is collected', thus '(place) where flowers are collected') lies in the Junín Region in the Andes of Peru. It extends between 11°47' and 11°56'S and 75°00' and 75°05'W for about 17 km. The surface area of the zone is 378'40 km^{2}. The range is located in the provinces of Concepción and Huancayo.

In 2011 Huaytapallana was declared an Area of Regional Conservation by Supreme Decrete No. 018-2011-MINAM. The area of 22,406.52 ha is situated in the districts of El Tambo, Huancayo, Pariahuanca and Quilcas of the Huancayo Province and in the Comas District of the Concepción Province.

== Mountains ==
The highest mountain in the range is Huaytapallana at 5,557 metres (18,232 ft) (Lasuntay). Other mountains are listed below:

- Chuspi or Chuspicocha, 5,500 metres (18,045 ft)
- Cochas, 5,315 metres (17,438 ft)
- Yana Ucsha, 5,300 metres (17,388 ft)
- Putkaqucha, 5,236 metres (17,178 ft)
- Anchhi, 5,200 metres (17,060 ft)
- Qalla Qhata, 5,200 metres (17,060 ft)
- Talwis, 5,200 metres (17,060 ft)
- Pakaku, 5,200 metres (17,060 ft)
- Puywan, 5,100 metres (16,732 ft)
- T'illu, c. 5,050 metres (16,568 ft)
- Piñaqucha, 5,000 metres (16,404 ft)
- Marayrasu, 4,943 metres (16,217 ft)
- Ch'iwan, 4,800 metres (15,748 ft)
- Kiswar, 4,800 metres (15,748 ft)
- Kuchilluyuq, 4,800 metres (15,748 ft)
- Tunshu, 4,800 metres (15,748 ft)

== Lakes ==
The zone contains six lakes:

- Ankap Wachanan (4,707 m amsl)
- Qarwaqucha (4,407 m amsl)
- Ch'uspiqucha (4,636 m amsl)
- Hatunqucha (4,593 m amsl)
- Lasu Hunt'ay (4,646 m amsl)
- Pumaqucha (4,622 m amsl)

== Accessibility ==
The Huaytapallana mountain range is about 2 hours drive from the city of Huancayo in the Junín Region. It is located 8 hours north-east of Lima.

For mountaineers in the mountain range, the departure point is called Virgen de las Nieves (Virgin of the Snow), located at 4,800 m (15,750 ft). At the Virgen de las Nieves there are two itineraries after which the ascent to the tip of the Huaytapallana can be completed.
