= Plaza El Coliseo (Huancayo) =

Bull-fighting stadium in Huancayo, Peru

Estadio Plaza El Coliseo is a bull-fighting stadium in Huancayo, Junin, Peru. The stadium holds 3,500 people.

== Heritage status ==
The Plaza El Coliseo, known as the Municipal Coliseum of Huancayo, is included within the Monumental Zone of Huancayo, which was declared a Historical Monument of Peru by the Main Resolution No. 009-89-INC/J on April 26, 1989.
