= El Tambo District =

Coordinates: 12.0504°S 75.2213°W

El Tambo Tampu
- District
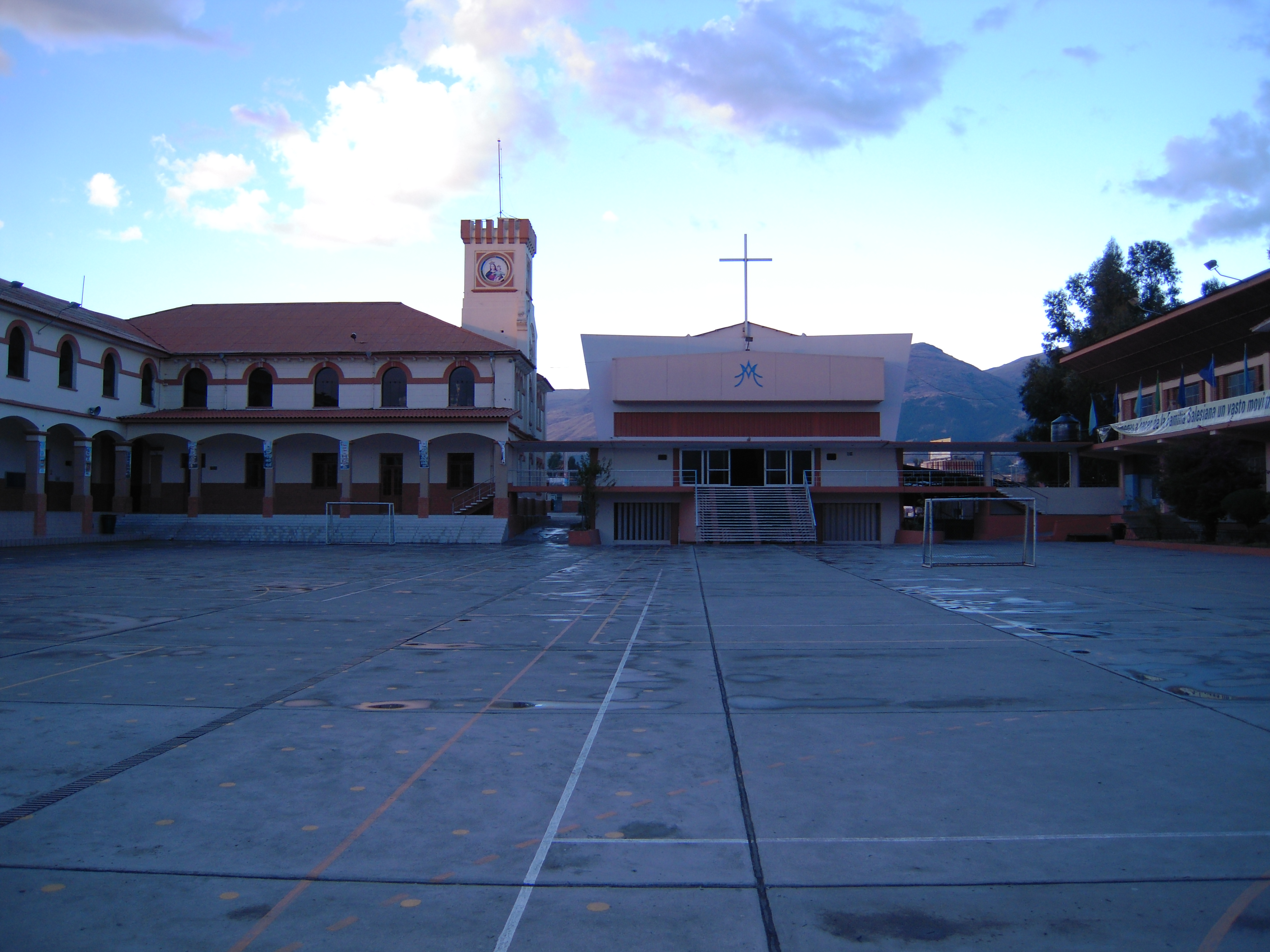
- Colegio Salesiano Santa Rosa Huancayo Peru
- Interactive map of El Tambo
- Country: Peru
- Region: Junín
- Province: Huancayo
- Founded: November 13, 1943
- Capital: El Tambo

Government
  - Mayor: Angel Dante Unchupaico Canchumani

Area
  - Total: 73.56 km^{2} (28.40 sq mi)
- Elevation: 3,260 m (10,700 ft)

Population (2005 census)
  - Total: 143,282
  - Density: 1,948/km^{2} (5,045/sq mi)
- Time zone: UTC-5 (PET)
- UBIGEO: 120114

El Tambo District is one of twenty-eight districts of the province Huancayo in Peru.

== Notable people ==
- Tongo (entertainer), born José Abelardo Gutiérrez Alanya (1957), singer and humorist

== Climate ==
Climate data for Santa Ana, El Tambo, elevation 3,293 m (10,804 ft), (1991–2020)
Month	Jan	Feb	Mar	Apr	May	Jun	Jul	Aug	Sep	Oct	Nov	Dec	Year
Mean daily maximum °C (°F)	19.4 (66.9)	19.0 (66.2)	18.9 (66.0)	19.9 (67.8)	21.0 (69.8)	20.5 (68.9)	20.4 (68.7)	20.8 (69.4)	20.7 (69.3)	20.8 (69.4)	21.4 (70.5)	20.0 (68.0)	20.2 (68.4)
Mean daily minimum °C (°F)	6.5 (43.7)	6.7 (44.1)	6.4 (43.5)	4.5 (40.1)	2.1 (35.8)	0.1 (32.2)	−0.4 (31.3)	1.2 (34.2)	3.7 (38.7)	5.2 (41.4)	5.4 (41.7)	6.3 (43.3)	4.0 (39.2)
Average precipitation mm (inches)	107.4 (4.23)	120.7 (4.75)	96.2 (3.79)	47.0 (1.85)	12.5 (0.49)	5.4 (0.21)	5.5 (0.22)	11.1 (0.44)	30.4 (1.20)	53.9 (2.12)	67.0 (2.64)	106.7 (4.20)	663.8 (26.14)
Source: National Meteorology and Hydrology Service of Peru

== See also ==
- Ankap Wachanan
- Putkaqucha
- Waytapallana mountain range
