= National University of the Center of Peru =

Coordinates: 12.0330°S 75.2373°W

- Universidad Nacional del Centro del Peru
- Type: Public, general
- Established: December 16, 1959
- Rector: Dr. Jesús Pomachagua Paucar
- Students: 10.0222
- Location: Huancayo, Peru.
- Campus: Av. Mariscal Ramón Castilla km. 5. Nº 3809, El Tambo.
- Colors: green
- Website: www.uncp.edu.pe

The National University of the Center of Peru (Universidad Nacional del Centro del Perú, UNCP), is the largest public university of the center of Peru. It was founded by supreme decree law no. 46 on December 16, 1959. Apart from its main campus in El Tambo, Huancayo, the university runs decentralized establishments in Junín, Satipo, and Tarma. The first rector was distinguished Peruvian geographer Javier Pulgar Vidal. During the 1960s, several former establishments, such as those in Lima (Universidad Nacional Federico Villarreal), Huánuco (Universidad Nacional Hermilio Valdizán), Huacho (Universidad Nacional José Faustino Sánchez Carrión) and Cerro de Pasco (Universidad Nacional Daniel Alcides Carrión), were transformed into universities.

== Faculties ==
The UNCP is organized into 22 faculties belonging to five major areas:

- Health sciences,
- Agricultural sciences,
- Engineering sciences and Architecture,
- Business administration, Economics and Accounting,
- Social sciences

Together they are offering 33 bachelor programs, 46 master programs, and seven doctorates.

== Cooperations ==
Current technical cooperations include the University of Sao Paulo (Brasil), the Technical University of Braunschweig (Germany), the University of Milano-Bicocca (Italy), the University of the Andes (Venezuela), and the Wayne State University (United States).
