= T'illu =

Mountain in Peru

- Location within Peru

Highest point
- Elevation: 5,050 m (16,570 ft)
- Coordinates: 11°49′15″S 75°05′27″W

Geography
- Location: Peru, Junín Region
- Parent range: Andes, Waytapallana

T'illu (Quechua for pinch, tweaking, Hispanicized spellings Tello, Tillo) is a mountain in the Andes of Peru, about 5,050 metres (16,568 ft) high. It is situated in the northern part of the main sector of the Waytapallana mountain range. It lies in the Junín Region, Concepción Province, Comas District.
