= Daniel Alcides Carrión National University =

Coordinates: 10°40′7″S 76°15′9″W

- Universidad Nacional Daniel Alcides Carrión
- Type: Public, general
- Established: April 12, 1965
- Rector: Dr. Felipe Yali Rupay
- Academic staff: ~450
- Students: ~8000
- Location: Cerro de Pasco, Peru.
- Campus: Ciudad Universitaria San Juan.
- Website: www.undac.edu.pe

The Daniel Alcides Carrión National University (Universidad Nacional Daniel Alcides Carrión), or UNDAC for short, is the public university of Cerro de Pasco, Peru. It was founded by decree law no. 15527 on April 12, 1965. The university runs establishments in La Oroya, Oxapampa, Yanahuanca, Paucartambo, Tarma and La Merced.

== Faculties ==
The UNDAC offers 21 bachelor, 17 master, and 3 doctoral programs, and is organized into 11 faculties:

- Faculty of Dentistry;
- Faculty of Health Sciences;
- Faculty of Education;
- Faculty of Communication Sciences;
- Faculty of Agricultural Sciences;
- Faculty of Engineering;
- Faculty of Mining;
- Faculty of Economics;
- Faculty of Business Administration;
- Faculty of Law and Political Sciences;
- Faculty of Medicine.
