= Huaytapallana =

Mountain in Peru

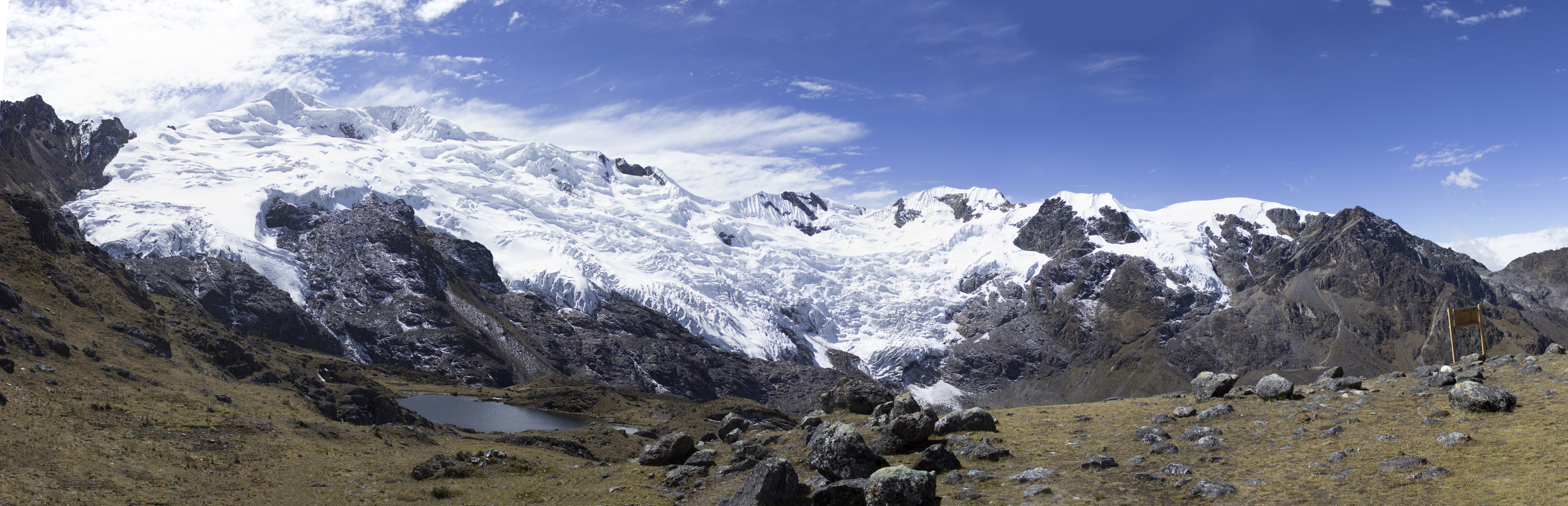

Highest point
- Elevation: 5,557 m (18,232 ft)
- Listing: List of mountains in the Andes
- Coordinates: 11°54′29″S 75°03′15″W

Geography
- Location within Peru
- Location: Peru, Junín Region, Huancayo Province, Huancayo District, Pariahuanca District
- Parent range: Andes, Huaytapallana

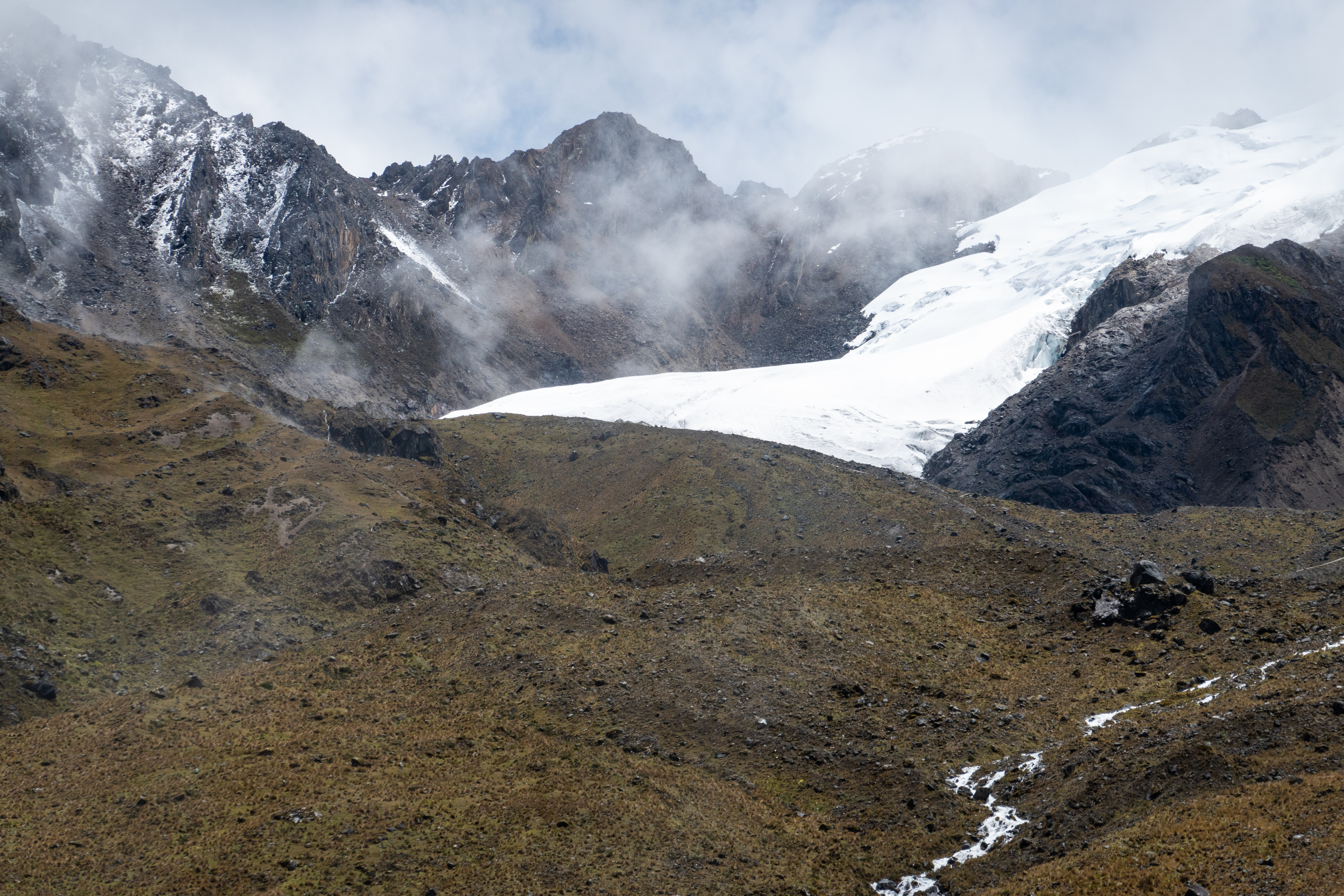
Glacier Huaytapallana

Huaytapallana (possibly from in the Quechua spelling Waytapallana; wayta wild flower, a little bunch of flowers, pallay to collect, pallana an instrument to collect fruit / collectable, Waytapallana "a place where you collect wild flowers",) or Lasuntay is the highest peak in the Huaytapallana mountain range in the Andes of Peru. Its summit reaches about 5,557 m (18,232 ft) above sea level. The mountain is situated in the Junín Region, Huancayo Province, in the districts of Huancayo and Pariahuanca.
