= Huancayo District =

Huancayo Wankayuq
- District
- Flag Coat of arms
- Interactive map of Huancayo
- Country: Peru
- Region: Junín
- Province: Huancayo
- Founded: January 02, 1857
- Capital: Huancayo

Government
  - Mayor: Henry López Cantorín (2019-2022)

Area
  - Total: 237.55 km^{2} (91.72 sq mi)
- Elevation: 3,249 m (10,659 ft)

Population (2005 census)
  - Total: 104,117
  - Density: 438.30/km^{2} (1,135.2/sq mi)
- Time zone: UTC-5 (PET)
- UBIGEO: 120101

Huancayo District is one of twenty-eight districts of the province Huancayo in Peru.

== See also ==
- Hatunqucha
- Kawituyuq
- Waytapallana mountain range
- Yana Uqsha
