= Corongo (disambiguation) =

Corongo can refer to a city, a district and a province in Peru.

For the use of the term in a specific setting, see:

- Corongo for the town in Peru
- Corongo District for the district in the Corongo province
- Corongo Province for the province in Ancash
