= Quchayuq =

Mountain in Peru

- Rumi Cruz
- Location within Peru

Highest point
- Elevation: 5,100 m (16,700 ft)
- Coordinates: 11°43′37″S 74°56′40″W

Geography
- Location: Peru, Junín Region
- Parent range: Andes

Quchayuq (Quechua qucha lake, -yuq a suffix, "the one with a lake (or lakes)", also spelled Jochayo) or Rumi Cruz (Quechua rumi stone, Spanish cruz cross, "stone cross") is a mountain in Peru, about 5,100 m (16,700 ft) high. It is located in the Junín Region, Concepción Province, on the border of the districts of Andamarca and Comas. It is northeast of the Waytapallana mountain range. Quchayuq lies north of Utkhu Warqu and the lake and the mountain named Putkaqucha.
