= Ancaracra =

Mountain in Peru

- Location within Peru

Highest point
- Elevation: 4,400 m (14,400 ft)
- Coordinates: 8°28′51″S 77°49′52″W

Geography
- Location: Peru, Ancash Region
- Parent range: Andes, Cordillera Blanca

Ancaracra or Anka Raqra (Quechua anka black-chested buzzard-eagle or eagle, raqra fissure, crack, crevice, "eagle crack (or crevice)", also spelled Ancaracra) is a mountain in the northern part of the Cordillera Blanca in the Andes of Peru which reaches a height of approximately 4,400 m (14,436 ft). It is located in the Ancash Region, Corongo Province, Cusca District. Ancaracra lies southwest of Gaico and southeast of Pacra.
