= Aco District =

Aco District may refer to:

- Aco District, Corongo, Peru
- Aco District, Concepción, Peru
