= Nueve de Julio Department =

Nueve de Julio Department may refer to:

- Nueve de Julio Department, Chaco
- Nueve de Julio Department, Río Negro
- Nueve de Julio Department, San Juan
- Nueve de Julio Department, Santa Fe

== See also ==
- Nueve de Julio District in Perú
- Nueve de Julio Partido in Argentina
- Nueve de Julio (disambiguation), towns in Argentina
