= List of ship decommissionings in 1977 =

The list of ship decommissionings in 1977 is a chronological list of ships decommissioned in 1977.

Date	Operator	Ship	Flag	Class and type	Fate	Other notes
3 March	Rederi AB Svea	Sveaborg	Sweden	Ferry	Chartered to Aarhus-Oslo Linie	Renamed Peer Günt
30 April	Spanish Navy	Almirante Lobo		Transport	Scrapped	
April (unknown date)	Lloyd Triestino	Galileo Galilei	Italy	Ocean liner	Laid up; rebuilt into a cruise ship	Sold to Italian Line during reconstruction
13 May	Finnlines	Bore Star	Finland	Ferry (used as a cruise ship)	End of charter; returned to Steamship Company Bore	Placed in Silja Line traffic
1 September	Swedish Lloyd	Patricia	Sweden	Ferry	Laid up in Gothenburg; sold to Stena Line in September 1978	Renamed Stena Oceanica
2 September	Swedish Lloyd	Saga	Sweden	Ferry	Laid up in Gothenburg; sold to Minoan Lines in March 1978	Renamed Knossos
1 October	Effoa	Aallotar	Finland	Ferry	Chartered to Polferries	
1 October	United States Navy	Franklin D. Roosevelt		Midway-class aircraft carrier	Scrapped	
22 October	Svea Line (Finland)	Fennia	Finland	Ferry	Laid up; chartered to Sessan Linjen 1978	
31 October	Argentine Navy	Nueve de Julio		Brooklyn-class	Scrapped in Japan in 1983	
30 December	Jydsk Færgefart A/S	Kattergat	Denmark	Ferry	Sold to P&O Normandy Ferries, March 1978	Renamed nf Tiger

== Bibliography ==
- Friedman, Norman (2022) [1983]. U. S. Aircraft Carriers: An Illustrated Design History (Revised ed.). Annapolis, Maryland: Naval Institute Press. ISBN 978-1-68247-762-5.
