= Winchus Hirka =

Mountain in Peru

- Location within Peru

Highest point
- Elevation: 4,200 m (13,800 ft)
- Coordinates: 8°30′29″S 77°45′01″W

Geography
- Location: Peru, Ancash Region
- Parent range: Andes, Cordillera Blanca

Winchus Hirka (Quechua winchus, winchu hummingbird, hirka mountain, "hummingbird mountain", also spelled Huinchusjirca) is a mountain in the northern part of the Cordillera Blanca in the Andes of Peru which reaches a height of approximately 4,200 m (13,780 ft). It is located in the Ancash Region, Corongo Province, Cusca District. It lies south of a mountain named Winchus (Guinchos).
