= Nueve de Julio =

Nueve de Julio (or 9 de Julio) means July 9 in Spanish. It may refer to:

- The date of the Argentine Declaration of Independence
- One of the following cities and towns in Argentina:
  - Nueve de Julio, Buenos Aires Province
  - Nueve de Julio, Corrientes
  - Nueve de Julio, Misiones
  - Nueve de Julio, San Juan
- 9 de Julio Avenue in Buenos Aires City
- Nueve de Julio District, Peru
- Protected Cruiser Nueve de Julio (1892), a former cruiser in the Argentine Navy
- ARA Nueve de Julio (C-5), a former cruiser in the Argentine Navy
- 9 de Julio station (Mendoza), Argentina
- 9 de Julio (Buenos Aires Underground), Argentina

== See also ==
- Nueve de Julio Partido, Buenos Aires
- Nueve de Julio Department (disambiguation), several national subdivisions in Argentina
