= Nueve =

Nueve (Spanish for 'nine') may refer to:

- Nueve (Spanish TV channel), short-lived channel from 2013–2014
- Nueve (Mexican TV network), also styled as Nu9ve, previously known as Galavisión and Gala TV
- Channel 9 (Argentina), also known as "El Nueve"
- La Nueve, 9th Company of the Régiment de marche du Tchad, who participated in the Liberation of France in World War II

== See also ==
- Nueve de Julio (disambiguation)
