= Manzanar (disambiguation) =

Manzanar is the historic site of a former World War II Japanese-American incarceration camp.

Manzanar (apple orchard in the Spanish language, plural manzanares) may also refer to:

- Manzanar, California, former settlement and agricultural area

Manzanares may refer to:

== People ==
- César Vidal Manzanares (born 1958), Spanish historian and author
- Francisco Antonio Manzanares (1843–1904), American businessman and politician
- José Mari Manzanares (the elder; 1953–2014), Spanish bullfighter
- José Mari Manzanares (the younger; born 1982), Spanish bullfighter and model
- Laia Manzanares (born 1994), Spanish actress
- Marina Manzanares Monjarás, Salvadoran political activist
- Myrna Manzanares (1946–2021), Belizan activist and writer
- Rafael Manzanares Aguilar (1918–1999), Honduran folklorist, author and composer

== Places ==
=== Spain ===
- Manzanares (river), flowing through Madrid
- Manzanares Park, near Madrid
- Estadio Manzanares, stadium in Madrid
- Manzanares, Ciudad Real, municipality in Ciudad Real Province
- Hoyo de Manzanares, municipality in Madrid Province
- Manzanares el Real, town in Madrid Province

=== South America ===
- Manzanares, Caldas in Columbia
- Manzanares District in Peru
- Manzanares River (South America) in Venezuela

== Other ==
- Manzanar Airfield, former airport in Owens Valley, alternative name of Inyo County Airport
