= Lake Llamacocha (Corongo) =

Lake in Peru

- Location within Peru
- Location: Peru; Ancash Region
- Coordinates: 8°35′21″S 77°43′03″W

Lake Llamacocha (possibly from Quechua llama llama, qucha lake) is a lake in the Andes of Peru. It is located in the Ancash Region, Corongo Province, Cusca District.
