= Gaico =

Mountain in Peru

- Location within Peru

Highest point
- Elevation: 5,049 m (16,565 ft)
- Coordinates: 8°27′37″S 77°48′57″W

Geography
- Location: Peru, Ancash Region
- Parent range: Andes, Cordillera Blanca

Gaico (possibly from Quechua qayqu, a type of hunt) is a 5,049 m (16,565 ft) mountain in the northern part of the Cordillera Blanca in the Andes of Peru. It is located in the Ancash Region, Corongo Province, Cusca District. Gaico lies southeast of Pacra.
