= Kuntur Wasi (Ancash) =

Mountain in Peru

- Location within Peru

Highest point
- Elevation: 4,200 m (13,800 ft)
- Coordinates: 8°37′52″S 77°42′44″W

Geography
- Location: Peru, Ancash Region
- Parent range: Andes, Cordillera Blanca

Kuntur Wasi (Quechua kuntur condor, wasi rock, "condor house", also spelled Condorhuasi) is a mountain in the northern part of the Cordillera Blanca in the Andes of Peru which reaches a height of approximately 4,200 m (13,780 ft). It is located in the Ancash Region, Corongo Province, Cusca District, and in the Sihuas Province, San Juan District.
