= Pisgochaga =

Mountain in Peru

- Location within Peru

Highest point
- Elevation: 4,374 m (14,350 ft)
- Coordinates: 8°31′01″S 77°43′55″W

Geography
- Location: Peru, Ancash Region
- Parent range: Andes, Cordillera Blanca

Pisgochaga (possibly from Quechua p'isqu bird, chaka bridge, "bird bridge") is a mountain in the northern part of the Cordillera Blanca in the Andes of Peru which reaches a height of 4,374 m (14,350 ft). It is located in the Ancash Region, Corongo Province, Cusca District.
