= Kawituyuq (Concepción) =

Mountain in Peru

- Location within Peru

Highest point
- Elevation: 4,600 m (15,100 ft)
- Coordinates: 12°08′02″S 75°34′47″W

Geography
- Location: Peru, Junín Region
- Parent range: Andes, Cordillera Central

Kawituyuq (Quechua kawitu camp bed; rocking chair; swing; barbecue, -yuq a suffix to indicate ownership, possibly "the one with a camp bed", also spelled Cahuituyoc) is a mountain in the Cordillera Central in the Andes of Peru which reaches a height of approximately 4,600 metres (15,092 ft). It is located in the Junín Region, Concepción Province, Quero District.
