= Andamarca District =

Andamarca Anta Marka
- District
- Interactive map of Andamarca
- Coordinates: 11.697°S 74.845°W
- Country: Peru
- Region: Junín
- Province: Concepción
- Founded: March 5, 1930
- Capital: Andamarca

Government
  - Mayor: Severo Quiñonez Atapoma

Area
  - Total: 694.9 km^{2} (268.3 sq mi)
- Elevation: 2,484 m (8,150 ft)

Population (2005 census)
  - Total: 6,151
  - Density: 8.852/km^{2} (22.93/sq mi)
- Time zone: UTC-5 (PET)
- UBIGEO: 120203

Andamarca (from Quechua Anta Marka, meaning "copper village") is one of fifteen districts of the Concepción Province in Peru.

== Geography ==
One of the highest peaks of the district is Utkhu Warqu at 5,149 m (16,893 ft). Other mountains are listed below:

- Allpa Q'asa
- Chichi Q'asa
- Lasu Pata
- Luntu
- Luychu Wasi
- Puma Kusma
- Putkaqucha
- Qalla Q'asa
- Quchayuq
- Silla Pata
- Utkhuyuq
- Wakuyniyuq
- Wamanripayuq
- Yana Qucha
