= San José de Quero District =

San José de Quero Q'iru
- District
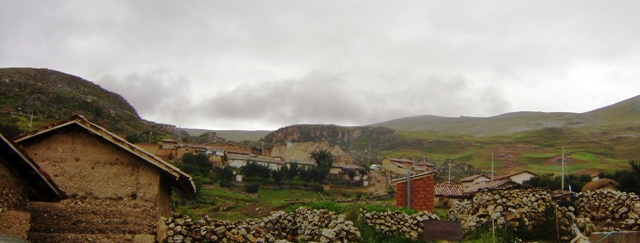
- Interactive map of San José de Quero
- Country: Peru
- Region: Junín
- Province: Concepción
- Founded: June 28, 1955
- Capital: San José de Quero

Government
  - Mayor: Juan Masias Aquino Pino

Area
  - Total: 317 km^{2} (122 sq mi)
- Elevation: 3,856 m (12,651 ft)

Population (2005 census)
  - Total: 6,671
  - Density: 21.0/km^{2} (54.5/sq mi)
- Time zone: UTC-5 (PET)
- UBIGEO: 120214

San José de Quero District is one of fifteen districts of the Concepción Province in Peru.

One of the highest peaks of the district is Kawituyuq at 4,803 m (15,758 ft). Other mountains are listed below:

- Challwayuq
- Kunkan Punta
- Liwinayuq
- Marayniyuq
- Pachaqniyuq
- Pinqulluyuq Punta
- Qutu Qutu
- Q'ala Chuku
- Uma Pukyu
- Uqsha Ruruna
- Waman Chuku
- Yana Ulu
