= San Juan District, Sihuas =

Coordinates: 9°07′13″S 78°11′38″W

San Juan District
- District
- Interactive map of San Juan District
- Country: Peru
- Region: Ancash
- Province: Sihuas
- Founded: March 14, 1964
- Capital: Chullin

Area
  - Total: 209.24 km^{2} (80.79 sq mi)
- Elevation: 2,725 m (8,940 ft)

Population (2005 census)
  - Total: 6,626
  - Density: 31.67/km^{2} (82.02/sq mi)
- Time zone: UTC-5 (PET)
- UBIGEO: 021909

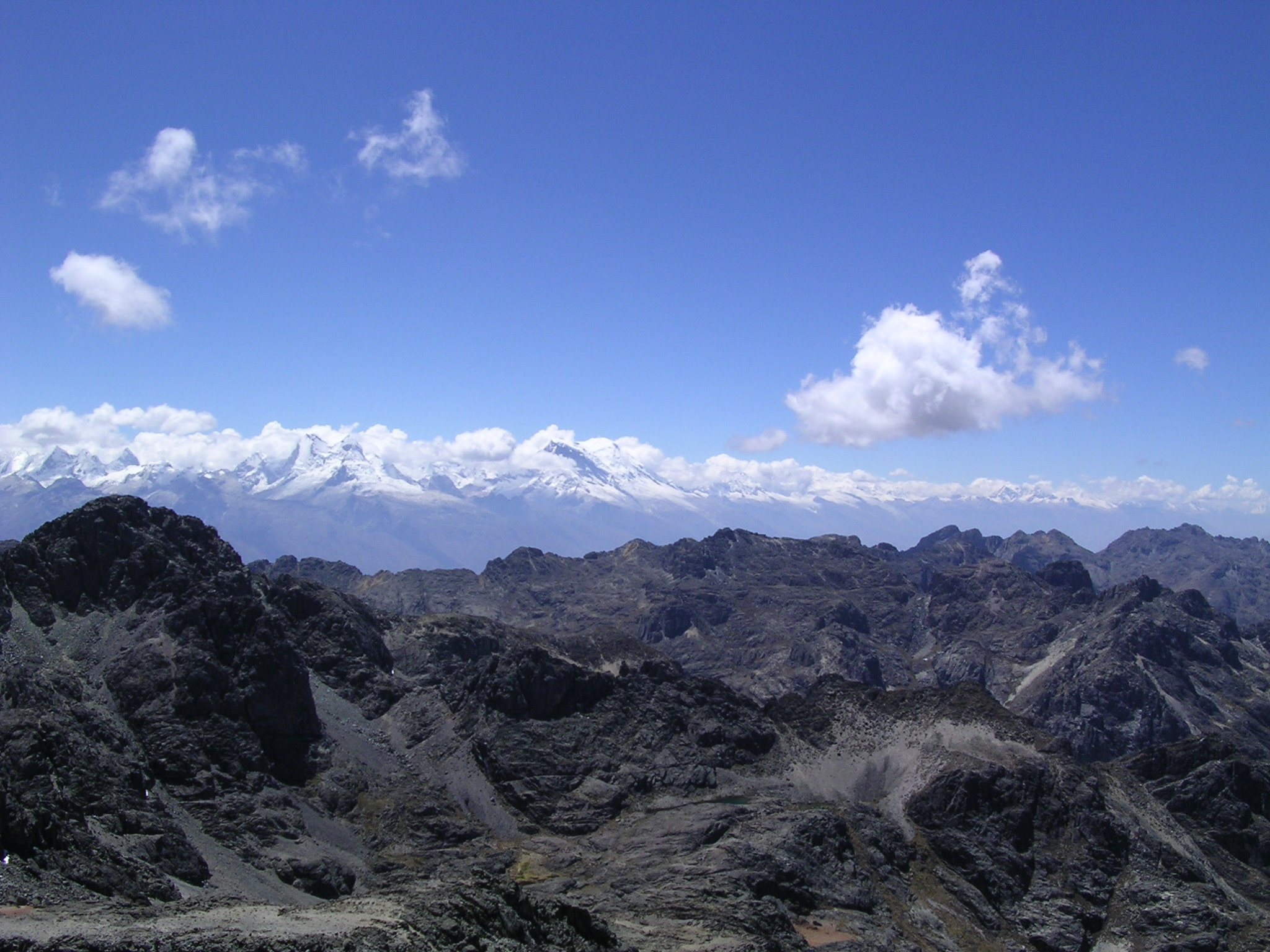

San Juan District is one of ten districts of the Sihuas Province in the Ancash Region of Peru.

== See also ==
- Kuntur Wasi
