= Matahuasi District =

Matahuasi Matawasi
- District
- Location within Peru
- Country: Peru
- Region: Junín
- Province: Concepción
- Founded: October 23, 1896
- Capital: Matahuasi

Government
  - Mayor: Gloria María Herrera Meza

Area
  - Total: 24.74 km^{2} (9.55 sq mi)
- Elevation: 3,262 m (10,702 ft)

Population (2005 census)
  - Total: 5,072
  - Density: 205.0/km^{2} (531.0/sq mi)
- Time zone: UTC-5 (PET)
- UBIGEO: 120210

Matahuasi District is one of fifteen districts of the province Concepción in Peru.
