= Mito District =

Mito Mitu
- District
- Interactive map of Mito
- Country: Peru
- Region: Junín
- Province: Concepción
- Capital: Mito

Government
  - Mayor: Gregorio Fernando Landeo Garcia

Area
  - Total: 25.21 km^{2} (9.73 sq mi)
- Elevation: 3,286 m (10,781 ft)

Population (2005 census)
  - Total: 1,598
  - Density: 63.39/km^{2} (164.2/sq mi)
- Time zone: UTC-5 (PET)
- UBIGEO: 120211

Mito District is one of fifteen districts of the province of Concepción in Peru.
