= Challwayuq (Junín) =

Mountain in Peru

- Location within Peru

Highest point
- Elevation: 4,400 m (14,400 ft)
- Coordinates: 12°06′14″S 75°35′39″W

Geography
- Location: Peru, Junín Region
- Parent range: Andes, Cordillera Central

Challwayuq (Quechua challwa fish, -yuq, "the one with fish", also spelled Chalhuayoc) is a mountain in the Cordillera Central in the Andes of Peru which reaches a height of approximately 4,400 metres (14,436 ft). It is located in the Junín Region, Concepción Province, Quero District, southwest of San José de Quero.
