= Mariscal Castilla District, Concepción =

Mariscal Castilla
- District
- Location within Peru
- Country: Peru
- Region: Junín
- Province: Concepción
- Founded: November 7, 1955
- Capital: Mucllo

Government
  - Mayor: Elmer Dario Dionisio Caja

Area
  - Total: 743.84 km^{2} (287.20 sq mi)
- Elevation: 2,550 m (8,370 ft)

Population (2005 census)
  - Total: 1,723
  - Density: 2.316/km^{2} (5.999/sq mi)
- Time zone: UTC-5 (PET)
- UBIGEO: 120209

Mariscal Castilla District (Spanish mariscal marshal) is one of fifteen districts of the province Concepción in Peru.
