= Puka Pampa =

Mountain in Peru

- Location within Peru

Highest point
- Elevation: 4,400 m (14,400 ft)
- Coordinates: 8°32′47″S 77°44′36″W

Geography
- Location: Peru, Ancash Region
- Parent range: Andes, Cordillera Blanca

Puka Pampa (Quechua puka red, pampa plain, "red plain", also spelled Pucapampa) is a mountain in the northern part of the Cordillera Blanca in the Andes of Peru which reaches a height of approximately 4,400 m (14,436 ft). It is located in the Ancash Region, Corongo Province, Cusca District.
