= Lasu Pata =

Mountain in Peru

- Location within Peru

Highest point
- Elevation: 4,900 m (16,100 ft)
- Coordinates: 11°42′48″S 74°52′18″W

Geography
- Location: Peru, Junín Region
- Parent range: Andes

Lasu Pata (local Quechua lasu (rasu) snow, ice, mountain with snow, pata step, bank of a river, also spelled Lazopata) is a mountain in Peru, about 4,900 m (16,100 ft) high. It is located in the Junín Region, Concepción Province, Andamarca District.
