= Bambas District =

Coordinates: 8°36′S 78°00′W

Bambas
- District
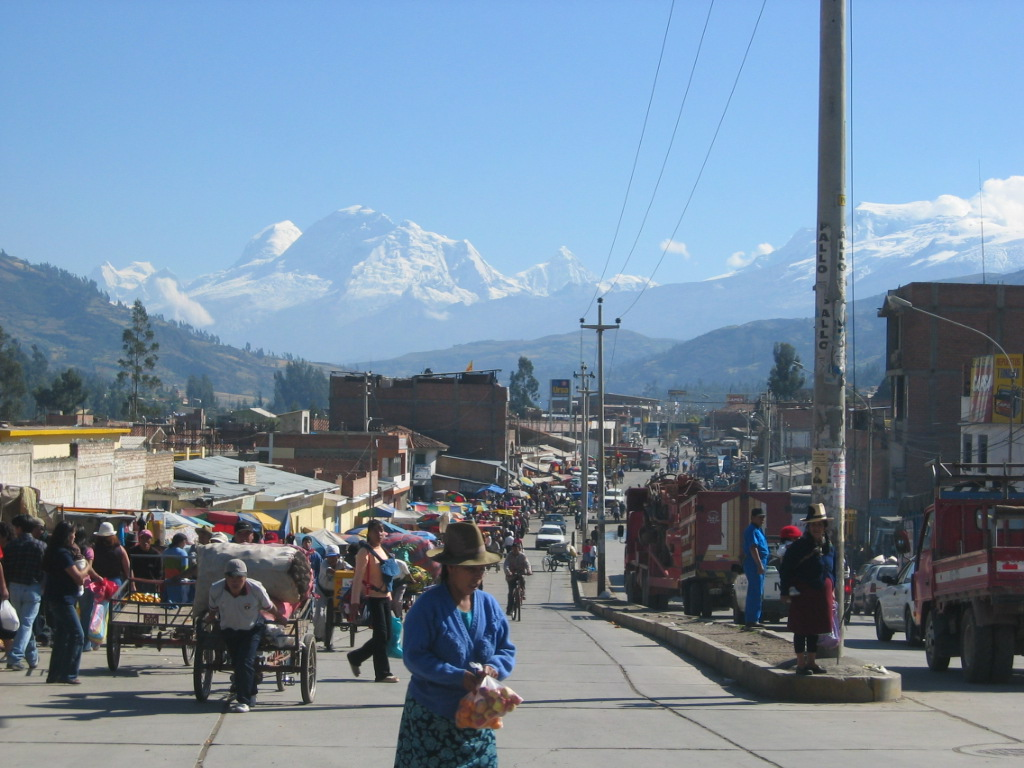
- Interactive map of Bambas
- Country: Peru
- Region: Ancash
- Province: Corongo
- Founded: October 5, 1940
- Capital: Bambas

Area
  - Total: 151.13 km^{2} (58.35 sq mi)
- Elevation: 2,975 m (9,760 ft)

Population (2005 census)
  - Total: 513
  - Density: 3.39/km^{2} (8.79/sq mi)
- Time zone: UTC-5 (PET)
- UBIGEO: 020903

Bambas District is one of seven districts of the Corongo Province in Peru.
