= Orcotuna District =

Orcotuna
- District
- Interactive map of Orcotuna
- Country: Peru
- Region: Junín
- Province: Concepción
- Founded: January 2, 1857
- Capital: Orcotuna

Government
  - Mayor: David Hugo Garcia Zorrilla

Area
  - Total: 44.75 km^{2} (17.28 sq mi)
- Elevation: 3,250 m (10,660 ft)

Population (2005 census)
  - Total: 4,169
  - Density: 93.16/km^{2} (241.3/sq mi)
- Time zone: UTC-5 (PET)
- UBIGEO: 120213

Orcotuna District is one of fifteen districts of the province Concepción in Peru.
