= Chambara District =

Chambara
- District
- Interactive map of Chambara
- Country: Peru
- Region: Junín
- Province: Concepción
- Founded: November 28, 1941
- Capital: Chambara

Government
  - Mayor: Hilarion Raul Rivera Lazo

Area
  - Total: 103.27 km^{2} (39.87 sq mi)
- Elevation: 3,593 m (11,788 ft)

Population (2017 census)
  - Total: 2,550
  - Density: 24.7/km^{2} (64.0/sq mi)
- Time zone: UTC-5 (PET)
- UBIGEO: 120204

Chambara District is one of fifteen districts of the province Concepción in Peru.
