= Santa Rosa de Ocopa =

- District
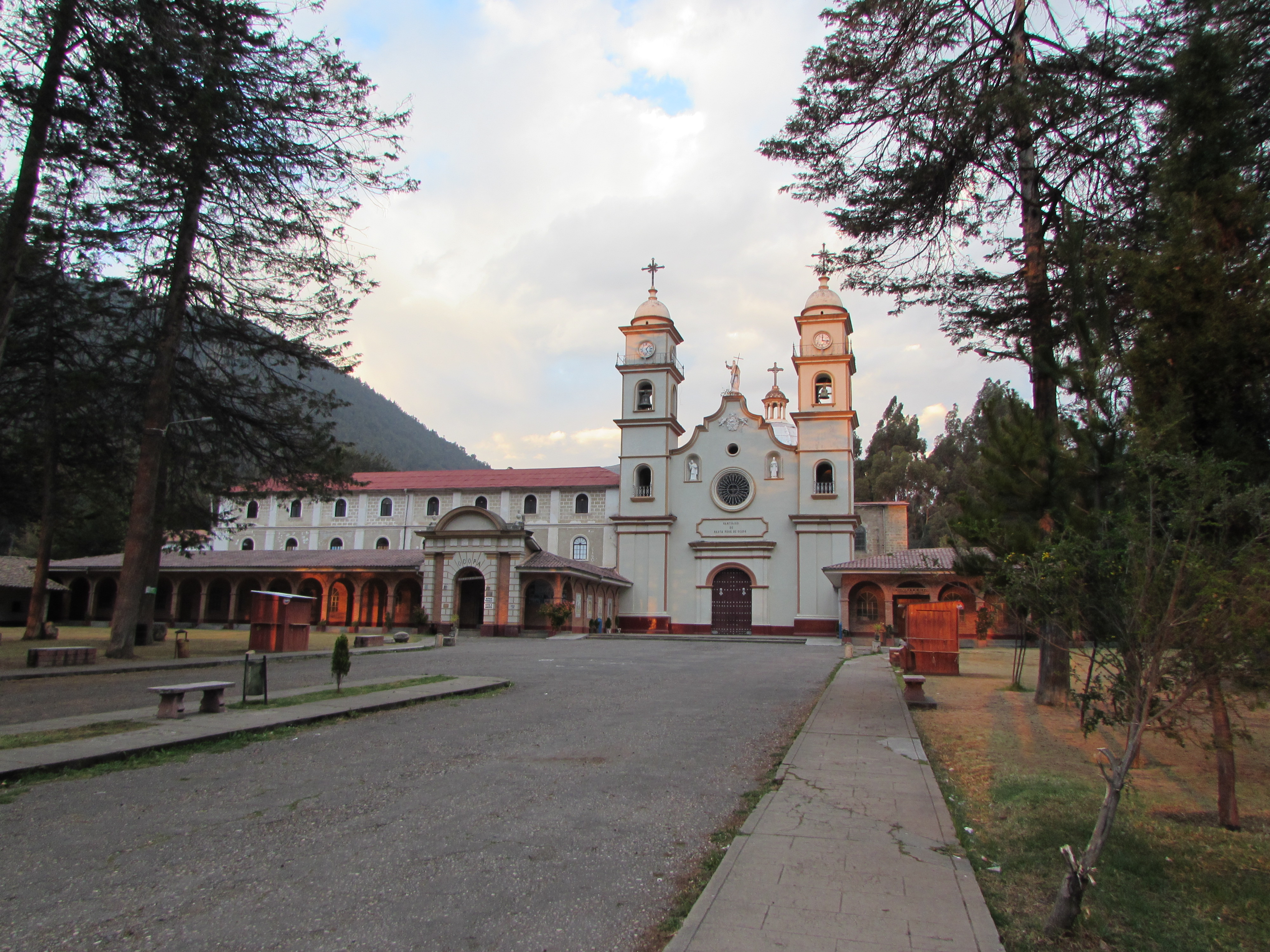
- The Convent of Santa Rosa de Ocopa
- Interactive map of Santa Rosa de Ocopa
- Coordinates: 11.877°S 75.295°W
- Country: Peru
- Region: Junín
- Province: Concepción
- Founded: August 29, 1921
- Capital: Santa Rosa

Government
  - Mayor: Humberto Ricardo Perez Sarapura

Area
  - Total: 16.1 km^{2} (6.2 sq mi)
- Elevation: 3,376 m (11,076 ft)

Population (2017 Census)
  - Total: 2,091
  - Density: 130/km^{2} (336/sq mi)
- Time zone: UTC-5 (PET)
- UBIGEO: 120215

Santa Rosa de Ocopa is the name of a district of Concepción province, Department of Junin in Peru. It is also the name of the capital of the district, and the name of a historic monastery in the district called the Convent of Santa Rosa de Ocopa. In 2017, the district had a population of 2,129 and an area of 16.1 square kilometres (6.2 sq mi). The capital of the district, the town of Santa Rosa, had a population of 1,263 in 2017 and an elevation of 3,376 metres (11,076 ft) above sea level. The name "Ocopa" comes from the Quechua "ocupi," meaning "within" or "corner."

Santa Rosa de Ocopa is located in the Mantaro Valley. The valley has a large area of arable land, unusual in the high altitudes of the Andes. Dating back to Pre-Columbian times, the Mantaro Valley has been a breadbasket for the people of the Andes.

== Convent of Santa Rosa de Ocopa ==
Santa Rosa was a place of importance after the Franciscans established the Convent of Santa Rosa de Ocopa in 1725 as a college of missionaries with the objective of converting to Christianity the indigenous people living in the Amazon Basin, especially in the Cerro de la Sal and the Gran Pajonal regions. The convent is located in the northern outskirts of the town of Santa Rosa. In the 21st century, the extensive compound making up the convent houses a museum with a library of 25,000 volumes, some from the 15th century, a large collection of paintings, many of them dating to the 18th century, and a natural history museum. The convent is a popular tourist destination.

At the height of its importance about 1800, Ocopa was the "largest missionary operation in the Americas, serving more than seventy parishes and missions over a vast swath of South America." Three hundred and two of the missionaries assigned to the Ocopa convent during the 18th and early 19th century were Spanish-born and they constituted the great majority of all the Ocopa missionaries. The Spanish influence caused political problems for the convent during the independence movements in South America. On 1 November 1824, revolutionary leader Simon Bolivar captured the convent and confiscated its wealth and arrested the missionaries. The convent was reconstituted in 1836, but had lost its importance.

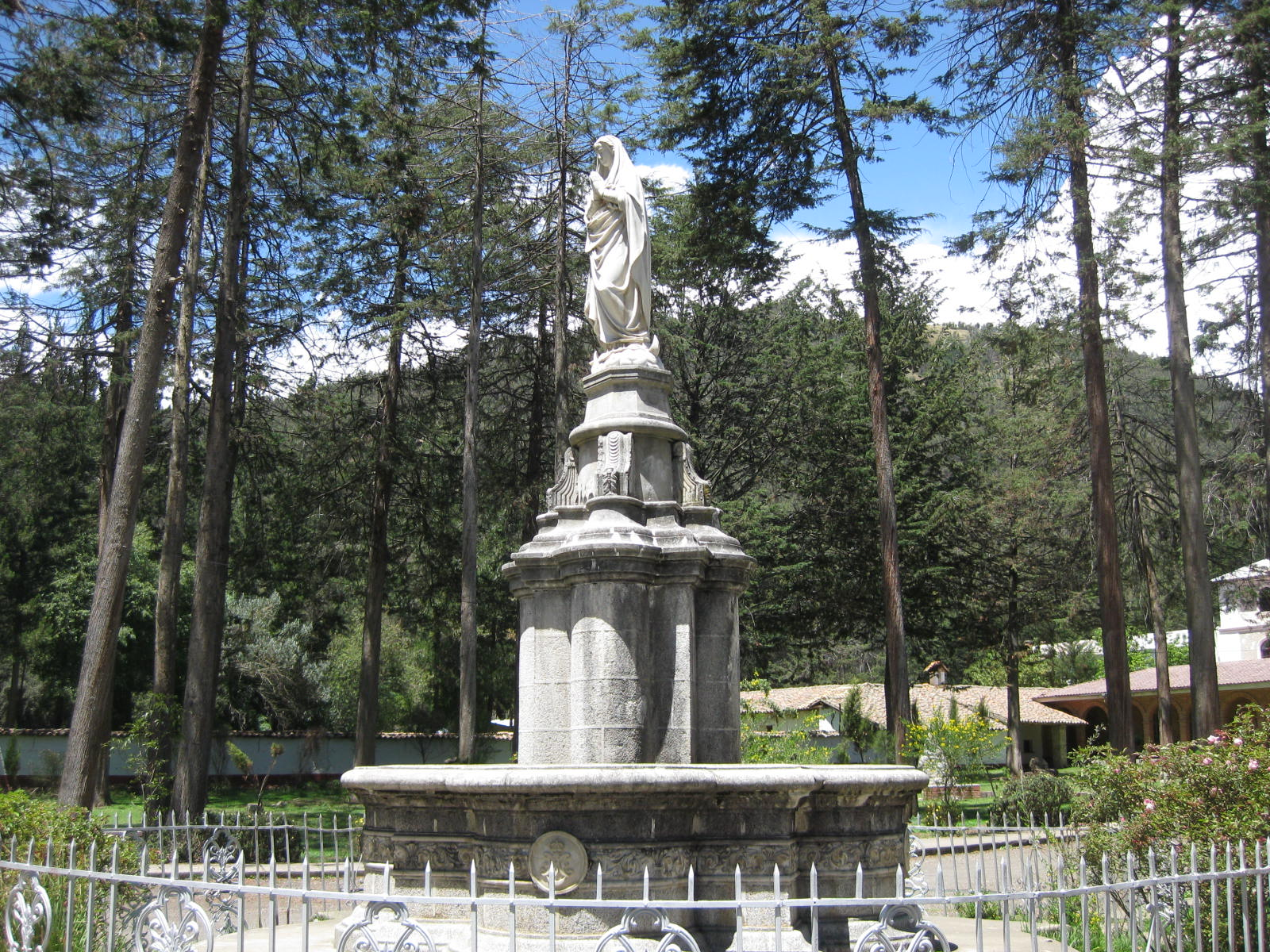
The statue of Santa Rosa

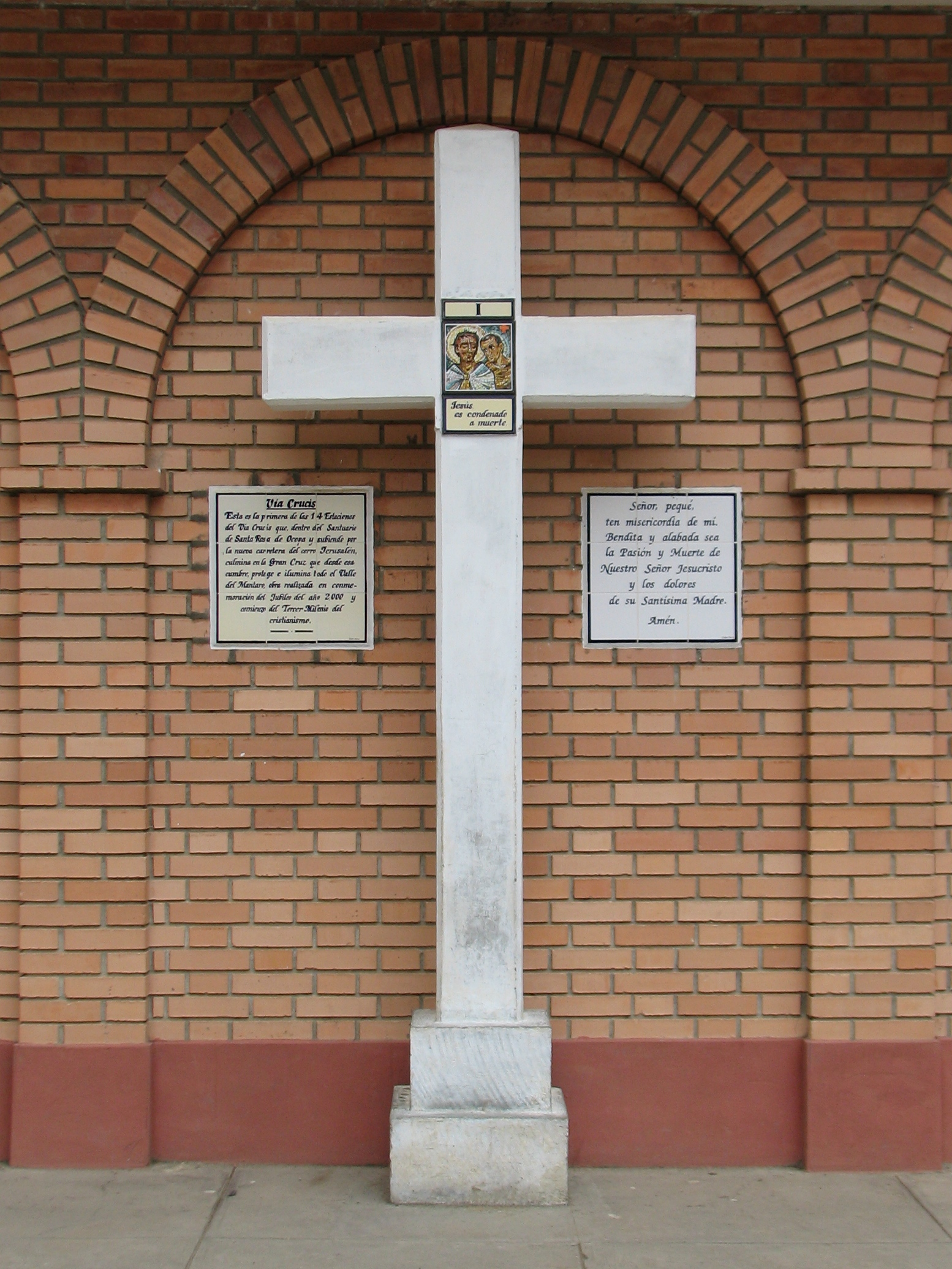
The first station of the cross

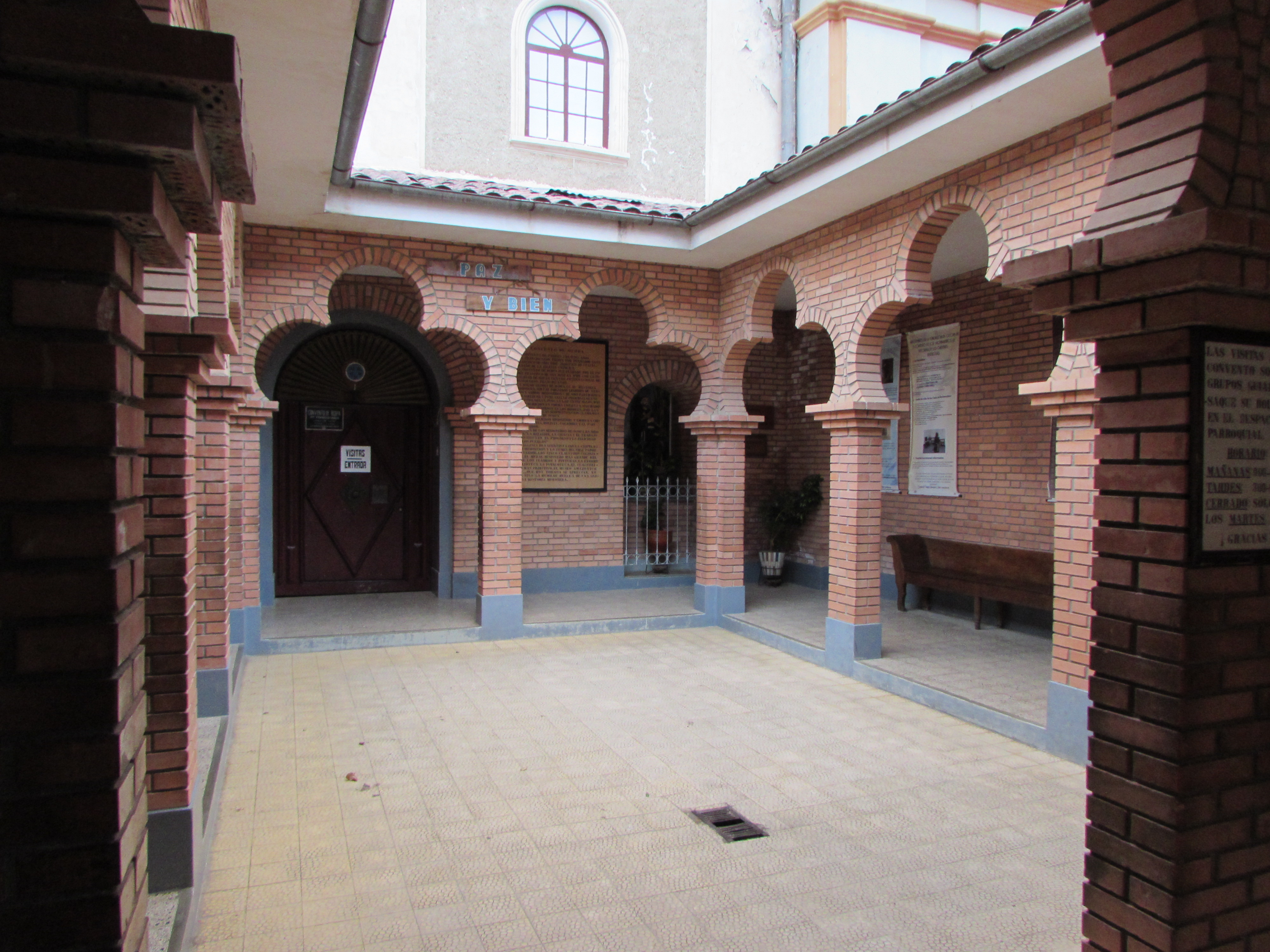
A cloister near the entrance

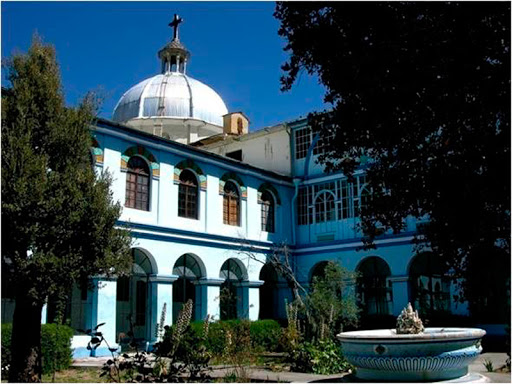
The Olive Cloister

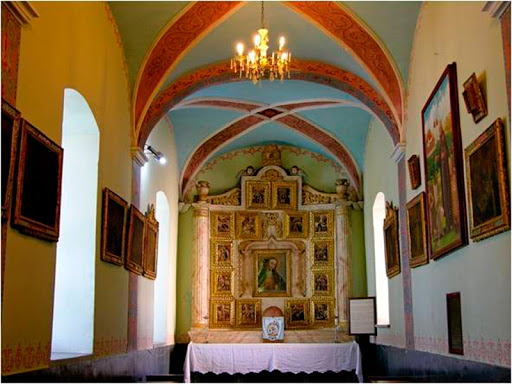
The chapel with the remains of the founder.

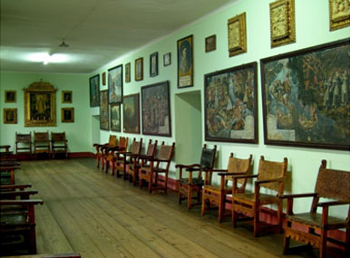
The art gallery

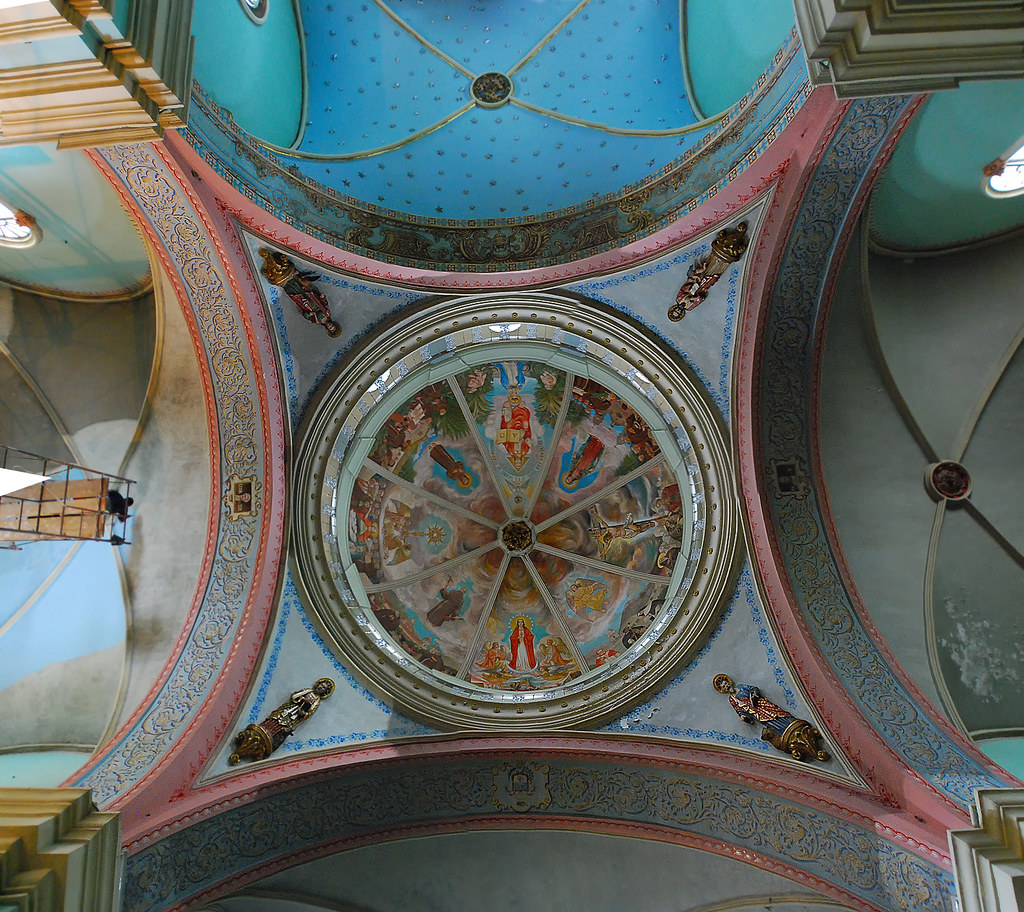
The dome of the church.

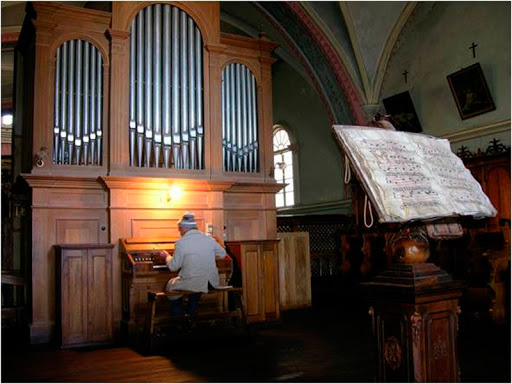
The organ in the church

== The Ruins of Ocupi ==
Located a few yards from the convent are the ruins of Ocupi, an archaeological site of the Huanca dating from 1100 CE to 1470 CE.

== Climate ==
Climate data for Ingenio, Santa Rosa de Ocopa, elevation 3,373 m (11,066 ft), (1991–2020)
Month	Jan	Feb	Mar	Apr	May	Jun	Jul	Aug	Sep	Oct	Nov	Dec	Year
Mean daily maximum °C (°F)	18.4 (65.1)	18.0 (64.4)	17.6 (63.7)	18.5 (65.3)	19.3 (66.7)	18.9 (66.0)	19.0 (66.2)	19.6 (67.3)	19.4 (66.9)	19.5 (67.1)	20.1 (68.2)	18.6 (65.5)	18.9 (66.0)
Mean daily minimum °C (°F)	6.2 (43.2)	6.6 (43.9)	6.4 (43.5)	5.2 (41.4)	2.9 (37.2)	1.1 (34.0)	0.4 (32.7)	1.6 (34.9)	4.0 (39.2)	5.2 (41.4)	5.5 (41.9)	6.3 (43.3)	4.3 (39.7)
Average precipitation mm (inches)	108.8 (4.28)	107.3 (4.22)	93.9 (3.70)	50.3 (1.98)	12.7 (0.50)	4.9 (0.19)	3.7 (0.15)	6.4 (0.25)	27.6 (1.09)	54.7 (2.15)	67.4 (2.65)	112.3 (4.42)	650 (25.58)
Source: National Meteorology and Hydrology Service of Peru

== See also ==
- Cerro de la Sal
- Gran Pajonal
