= Heroínas Toledo District =

Heroínas Toledo
- District
- Interactive map of Heroínas Toledo
- Country: Peru
- Region: Junín
- Province: Concepción
- Founded: January 9, 1956
- Capital: San Antonio de Ocopa

Government
  - Mayor: Adan Edgar Vasquez Ninanya

Area
  - Total: 25.83 km^{2} (9.97 sq mi)
- Elevation: 3,830 m (12,570 ft)

Population (2005 census)
  - Total: 1,506
  - Density: 58.30/km^{2} (151.0/sq mi)
- Time zone: UTC-5 (PET)
- UBIGEO: 120207

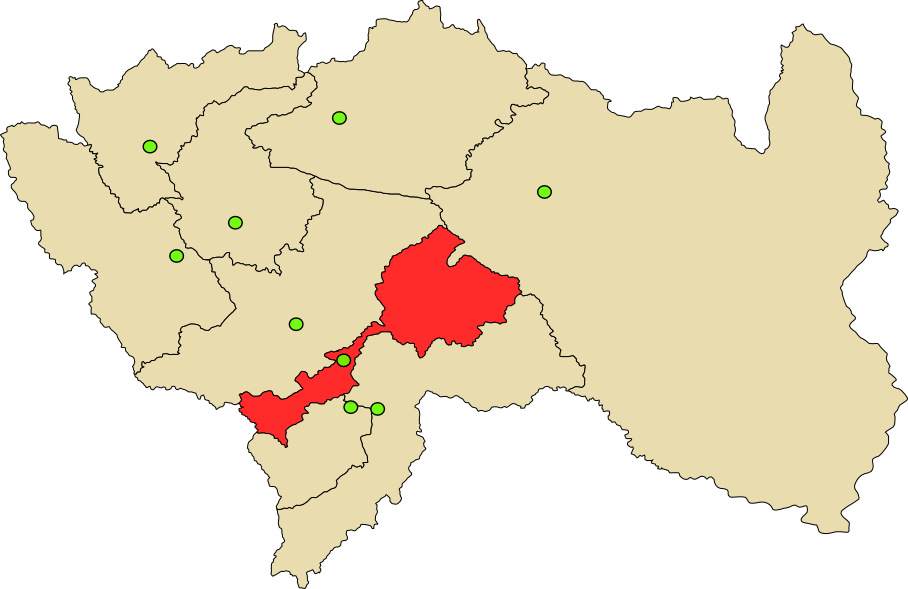
Above is a map of the district.

Heroínas Toledo District is one of fifteen districts of the province Concepción in Peru.
