= Yupan District =

Coordinates: 8°37′01″S 77°58′01″W

Yupan
- District
- Interactive map of Yupan
- Country: Peru
- Region: Ancash
- Province: Corongo
- Founded: May 9, 1923
- Capital: Yupan

Government
  - Mayor: Hugo Turriate Alva

Area
  - Total: 85.87 km^{2} (33.15 sq mi)
- Elevation: 2,734 m (8,970 ft)

Population (2005 census)
  - Total: 408
  - Density: 4.75/km^{2} (12.3/sq mi)
- Time zone: UTC-5 (PET)
- UBIGEO: 020907

Yupan District is one of seven districts of the Corongo Province in Peru.
