= Puka Hirka (Corongo) =

Mountain in Peru

- Location within Peru

Highest point
- Elevation: 4,200 m (13,800 ft)
- Coordinates: 8°35′35″S 77°42′52″W

Geography
- Location: Peru, Ancash Region
- Parent range: Andes, Cordillera Blanca

Puka Hirka (Quechua puka red, hirka mountain, "red mountain", also spelled Pucajirca) is a mountain in the northern part of the Cordillera Blanca in the Andes of Peru which reaches a height of approximately 4,200 m (13,780 ft). It is located in the Ancash Region, Corongo Province, Cusca District.
