= Cusca District =

Coordinates: 8°31′01″S 77°52′01″W

Cusca
- District
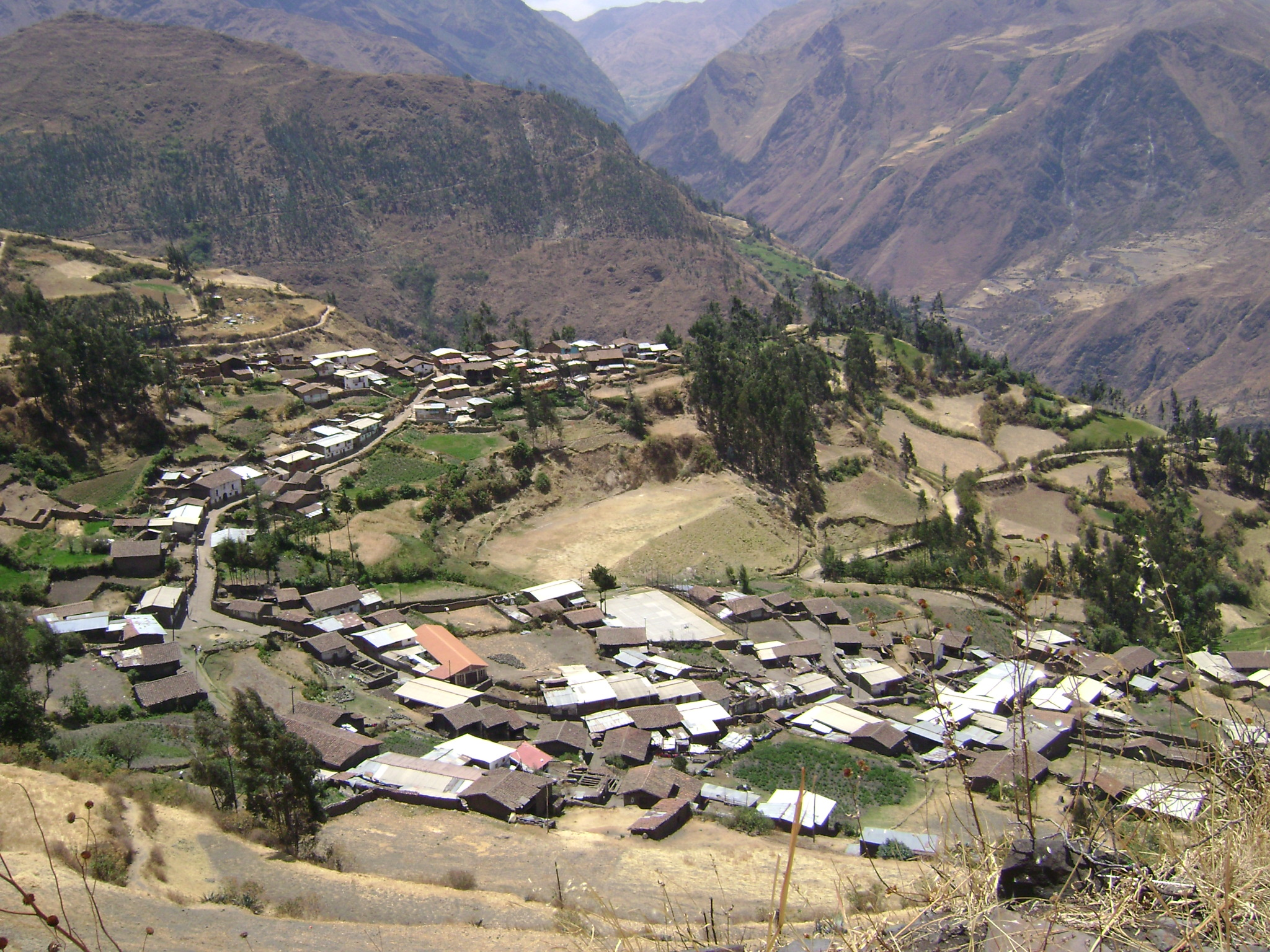
- Cusca
- Interactive map of Cusca
- Country: Peru
- Region: Ancash
- Province: Corongo
- Founded: May 9, 1923
- Capital: Cusca

Area
  - Total: 411.55 km^{2} (158.90 sq mi)
- Elevation: 3,242 m (10,636 ft)

Population (2005 census)
  - Total: 2,301
  - Density: 5.591/km^{2} (14.48/sq mi)
- Time zone: UTC-5 (PET)
- UBIGEO: 020904

Cusca District is one of seven districts of the Corongo Province in Peru.

== Geography ==
Some of the highest mountains of the district are listed below:

- Anka Raqra
- Asnu Qucha
- Ch'uru Qaqa
- Kuntur Wasi
- Mama Hirka
- Mama Pampa
- Paqra
- Parya Chuku
- Pillu Kunka
- Puka Ch'uru
- Puka Hirka
- Puka Pampa
- P'aqra
- P'isqu Chaka
- Q'ara Hirka
- Qayqu
- Qullpa Hanka
- Winchu Qucha
- Winchus
- Winchus Hirka
- Yawar Qucha

== See also ==
- Llamaqucha
