= Utkhu Warqu =

Mountain in Peru

- Location within Peru

Highest point
- Elevation: 5,149 m (16,893 ft)
- Coordinates: 11°44′02″S 74°56′45″W

Geography
- Location: Peru, Junín Region
- Parent range: Andes

Utkhu Warqu (Quechua utkhu cotton, warqu opuntia flocossa, Hispanicized spelling Utcohuarco) is a 5,149-metre-high (16,893 ft) mountain in Peru. It is located in the Junín Region, Concepción Province, on the border of the districts of Andamarca and Comas. It is northeast of the Waytapallana mountain range. Utkhu Warqu lies north of the lake and the mountain named Putkaqucha.
