= Concepción province, Peru =

Coordinates: 11.918478°S 75.312889°W

Concepción
- Province
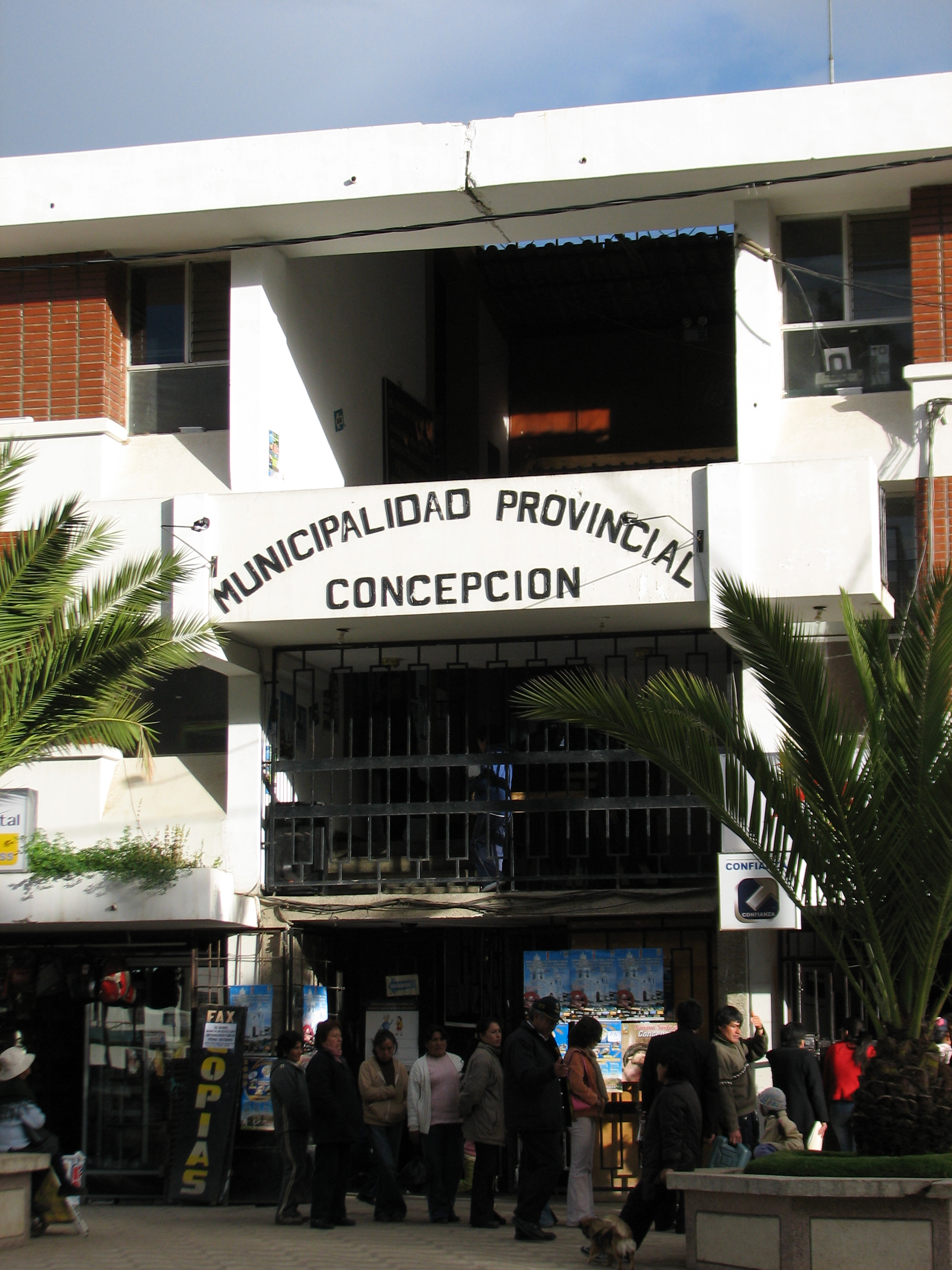

- Coat of arms

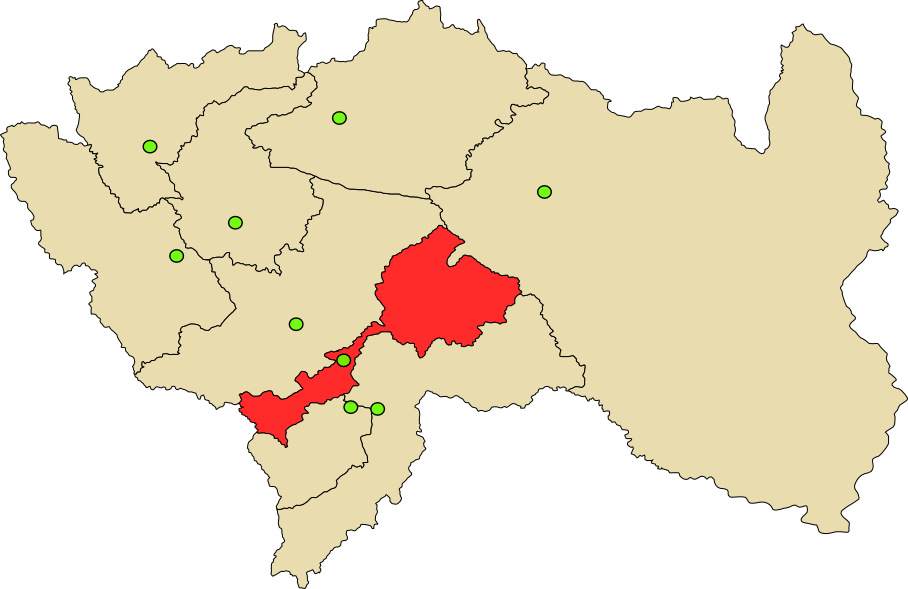
- Location of Concepción in the Junín Region
- Country: Peru
- Region: Junín
- Capital: Concepción

Government
  - Mayor: Benjamín Próspero De la Cruz Palomino (2019-2022)

Area
  - Total: 3,067.52 km^{2} (1,184.38 sq mi)

Population
  - Total: 55,591
  - Density: 18.122/km^{2} (46.937/sq mi)
- UBIGEO: 120201
- Website: www.municoncepcion.gob.pe

Concepción is one of nine provinces in the Junín Region in central Peru. Its capital is Concepción.

Notable sites include "El convento de Santa Rosa de Ocopa", which contains a vast library and artefacts that were acquired from the first Spanish expeditions to the Peruvian Amazon rainforest.

== Geography ==
The Huaytapallana mountain range traverses the province.

Some of the highest peaks of the province are:

- Allpa Q'asa
- Anchhi
- Aywin
- Challwayuq
- Chichi Q'asa
- Ch'uspi
- Kawituyuq
- Kimaqucha
- Kimsa Uchku
- Kiswar
- Liwinayuq
- Llant'a Pallaku
- Lasu Pata
- Marayrasu
- Muratayuq
- Pachaqniyuq
- Pinkuylluyuq Punta
- Puma Kusma
- Putkaqucha
- Putkaqucha (Concepción)
- Puywan
- Quchayuq
- Qutu Qutu
- T'illu
- Uma Pukyu
- Utkhulasu
- Utkhu Warqu
- Wamanripayuq
- Warmi Sinqa
- Waytapallana
- Yanaqucha

== Political division ==
The province is divided into seventeen districts (Spanish: distritos, singular: distrito), each of which is headed by a mayor (alcalde):

- Concepción
- Aco
- Andamarca
- Chambara
- Cochas
- Comas
- Heroínas Toledo
- Manzanares
- Mariscal Castilla
- Matahuasi
- Mito
- Nueve de Julio
- Orcotuna
- San José
- Santa Rosa de Ocopa
