= Yanac District =

Coordinates: 8°37′01″S 77°52′01″W

Yanac Yanaq
- District
- Interactive map of Yanac
- Country: Peru
- Region: Ancash
- Province: Corongo
- Founded: June 15, 1936
- Capital: Yanac

Government
  - Mayor: Manuel Pedro Mateo Barrionuevo

Area
  - Total: 45.85 km^{2} (17.70 sq mi)
- Elevation: 2,860 m (9,380 ft)

Population (2005 census)
  - Total: 769
  - Density: 16.8/km^{2} (43.4/sq mi)
- Time zone: UTC-5 (PET)
- UBIGEO: 020906

Yanac District is one of seven districts of the Corongo Province in Peru.
