= Corongo District =

Coordinates: 8°34′59″S 77°55′01″W

Corongo
- District
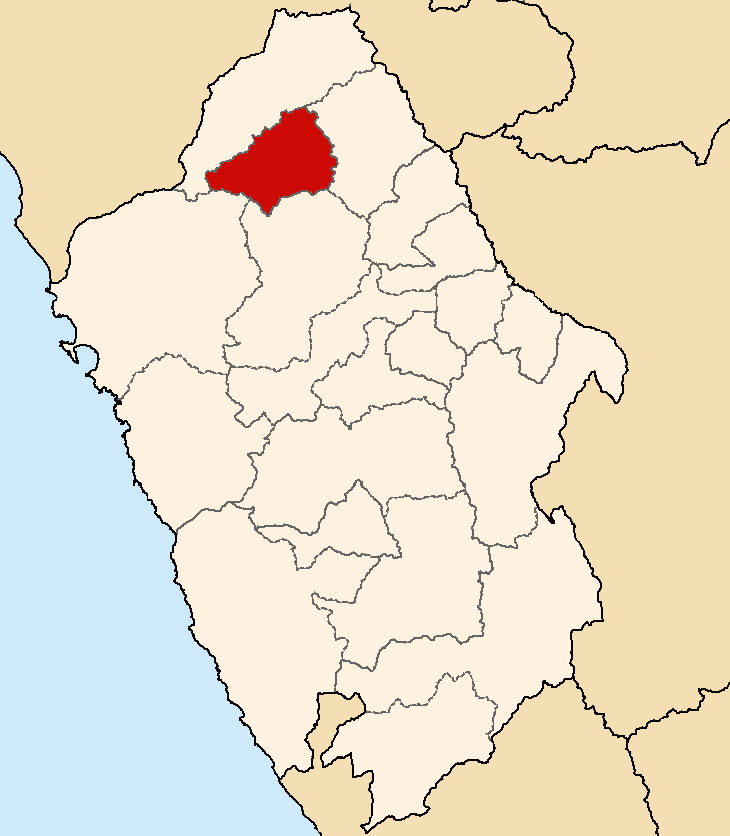
- Interactive map of Corongo
- Country: Peru
- Region: Ancash
- Province: Corongo
- Founded: January 2, 1857
- Capital: Corongo

Area
  - Total: 143.13 km^{2} (55.26 sq mi)
- Elevation: 3,141 m (10,305 ft)

Population (2005 census)
  - Total: 2,093
  - Density: 14.62/km^{2} (37.87/sq mi)
- Time zone: UTC-5 (PET)
- UBIGEO: 020901

Corongo District is one of seven districts of the Corongo Province in Peru.
