= Corongo province =

Coordinates: 8°30′34″S 77°54′37″W

Corongo
- Province
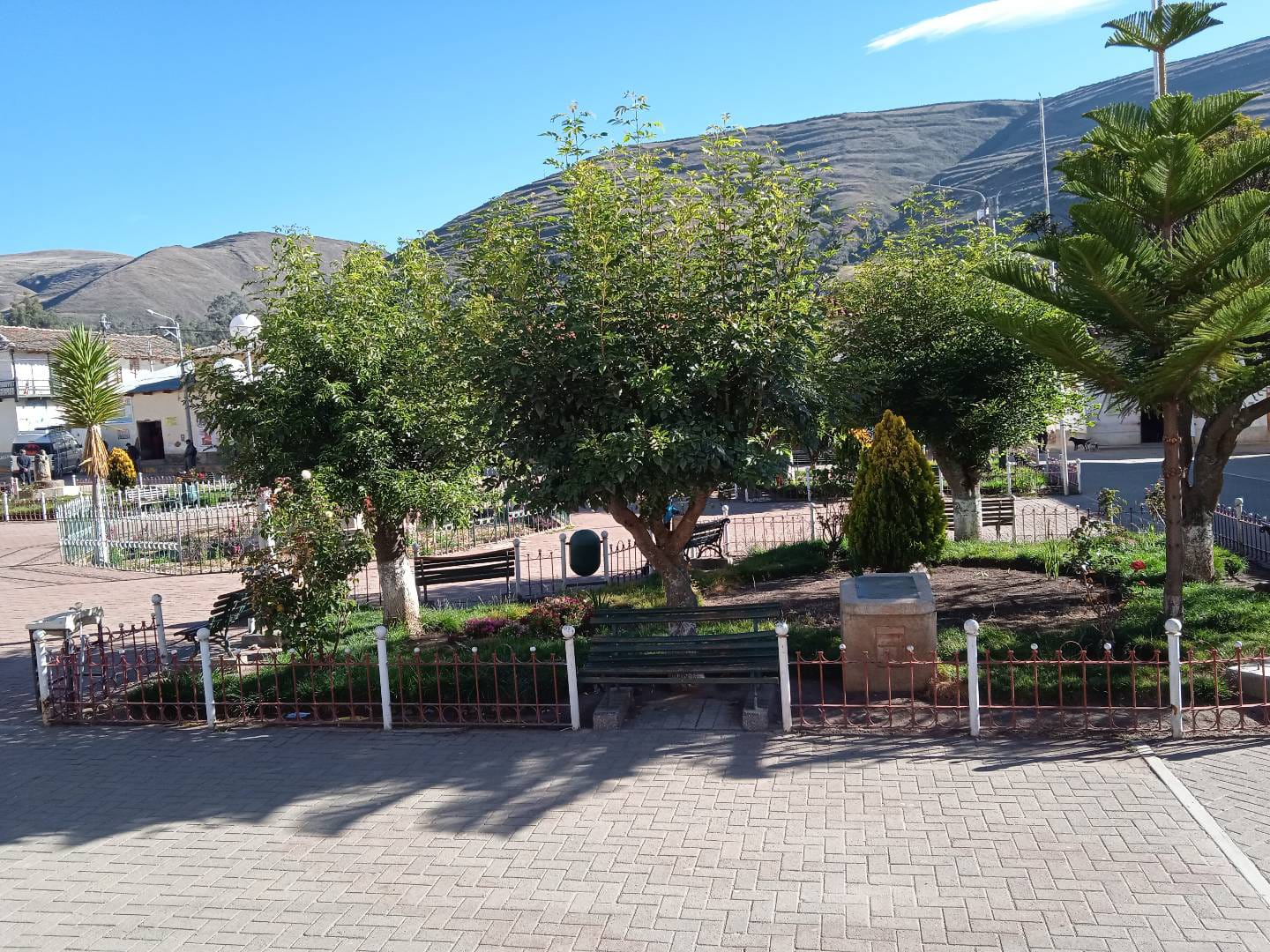
- Municipal Park in Corongo

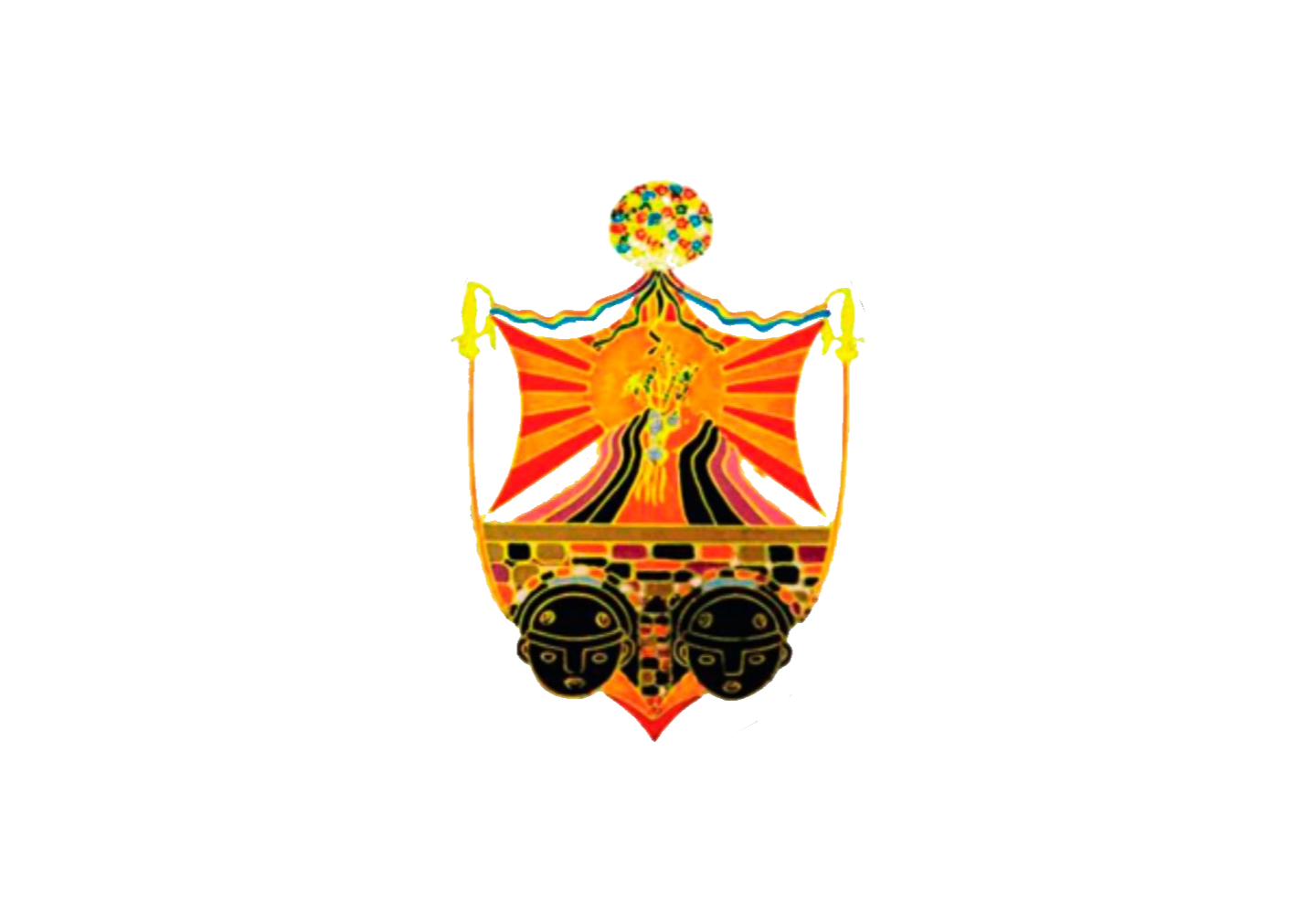
- Coat of Arms of Corongo

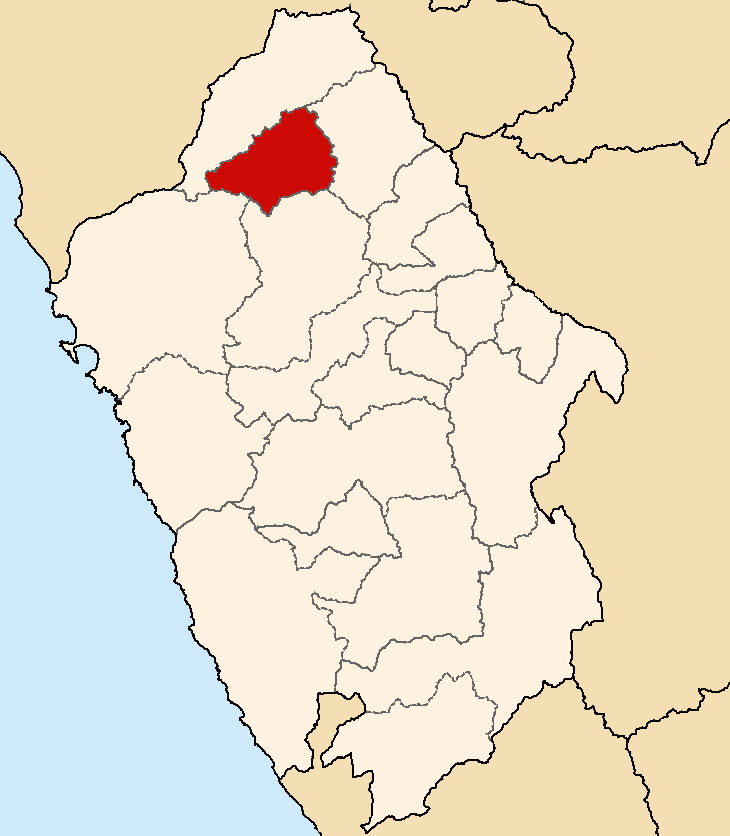
- Location of Corongo in the Ancash Region

- Location of Ancash in Perú
- Country: Peru
- Region: Ancash
- Capital: Corongo

Government
  - Mayor: JULIO FELIX DE LA CRUZ ARAMBURU (2007)

Area
  - Total: 988.01 km^{2} (381.47 sq mi)

Population
  - Total: 7,786
  - Density: 7.880/km^{2} (20.41/sq mi)

Corongo is one of 20 provinces of the Ancash Region in Peru. Its capital is Corongo located at an altitude of 3,141 m (10,305 ft).

Corongo is situated in a calm valley where the river of the same name runs. It is bordered by the following provinces: to the north and to the west by Pallasca, to the east by Sihuas and to the south by Huaylas and Santa. At the time of census 2005 the province had 7,786 inhabitants, distributed in the urban zone and mainly in the countryside.

Corongo has a great variety of places to visit, especially lakes located in the high parts of the province, and the thermal baths of Aticara and Pacatqui.

The geographical coordinates are 8º30'34" S and 77º54'37" W.

== Geography ==
Some of the highest mountains of the province are listed below:

- Anka Raqra
- Aqus Punta
- Asnu Qucha
- Ayan Quri
- Kunkayuq
- Kuntur Wasi
- Maray Pampa
- Ñuñuyuq
- Parya Chuku
- Pillu Kunka
- Puka Ch'uru
- Puka Puyku
- Puma
- P'isqu Chaka
- Puka Hirka
- Puka Pampa
- P'aqra
- Qayqu
- Qullpa Hanka
- Q'ara Hirka
- Sara Pirqan
- Wamani
- Winchu Qucha
- Winchus
- Winchus Hirka
- Yawar Qucha

== Political division ==
Corongo is divided into seven districts, which are:

- Aco
- Bambas
- Corongo
- Cusca
- La Pampa
- Yanac
- Yupan

== Ethnic groups ==
The province is inhabited by indigenous citizens of Quechua descent. Spanish is the language which the majority of the population (90.35%) learnt to speak in childhood, 9.44% of the residents started speaking using the Quechua language (2007 Peru Census).

== See also ==
- Llamaqucha
- Quyllurqucha
