= Corongo =

Coordinates: 8°35′S 77°55′W

- Town
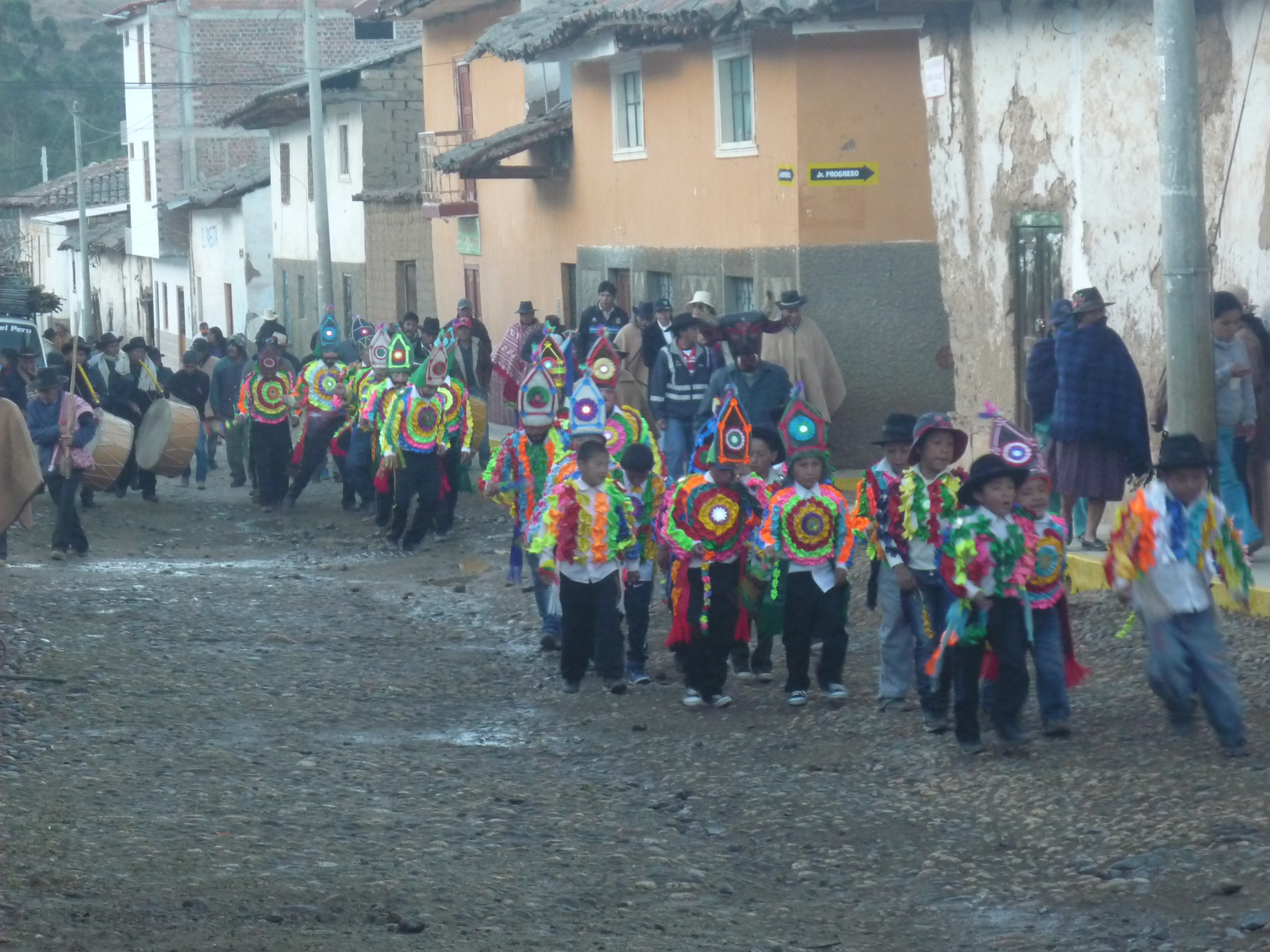
- Interactive map of Corongo
- Country: Peru
- Region: Ancash
- Province: Corongo
- District: Corongo

Government
  - Mayor: Julio Felix De La Cruz Aramburu
- Elevation: 3,141 m (10,305 ft)

Corongo is a town in central Peru, capital of the province Corongo in the region Ancash.
