= Manzanares District =

Manzanares
- District
- Interactive map of Manzanares
- Country: Peru
- Region: Junín
- Province: Concepción
- Founded: January 16, 1953
- Capital: San Miguel

Government
  - Mayor: Miguel Ricardo Rojas Davila

Area
  - Total: 20.36 km^{2} (7.86 sq mi)
- Elevation: 3,372 m (11,063 ft)

Population (2005 census)
  - Total: 1,669
  - Density: 81.97/km^{2} (212.3/sq mi)
- Time zone: UTC-5 (PET)
- UBIGEO: 120208

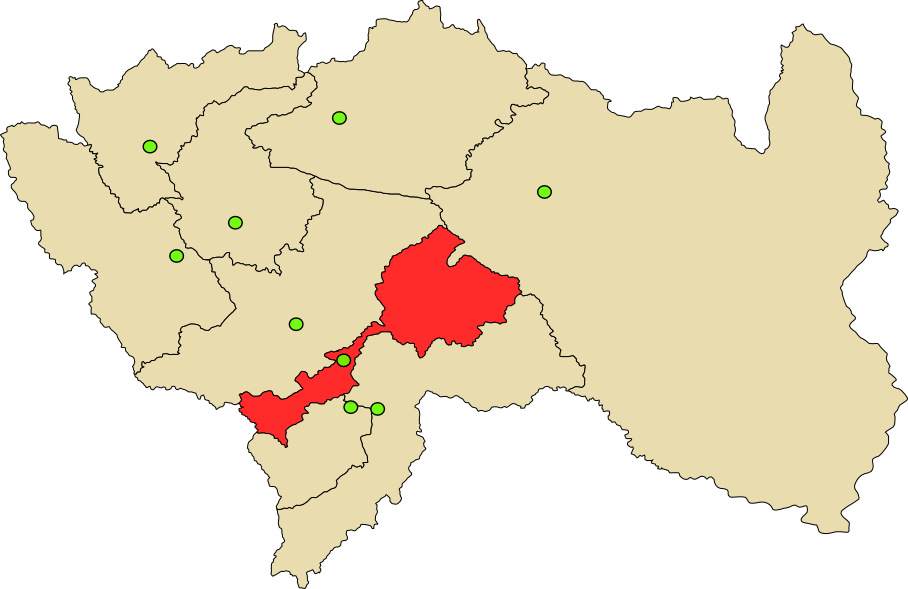
The Concepción Province

Manzanares District is one of fifteen districts of the province Concepción in Peru.
