= Aco District, Corongo =

Coordinates: 8°31′59″S 77°52′59″W

Aco Aqu
- District
- Interactive map of Aco; Aqu
- Country: Peru
- Region: Ancash
- Province: Corongo
- Founded: May 9, 1923
- Capital: Aco

Government
  - Mayor: Eustaquio Sanchez Asencio

Area
  - Total: 56.54 km^{2} (21.83 sq mi)
- Elevation: 3,150 m (10,330 ft)

Population (2005 census)
  - Total: 500
  - Density: 8.8/km^{2} (23/sq mi)
- Time zone: UTC-5 (PET)
- UBIGEO: 020902

Aco District is one of seven districts of the Corongo Province in Peru.
