= Aco District, Concepción =

Aco Aqu
- District
- Interactive map of Aco
- Country: Peru
- Region: Junín
- Province: Concepción
- Founded: December 3, 1917
- Capital: Aco

Government
  - Mayor: Tomas Martínez (2019-2022)

Area
  - Total: 37.8 km^{2} (14.6 sq mi)
- Elevation: 3,480 m (11,420 ft)

Population (2017)
  - Total: 1,642
  - Density: 43.4/km^{2} (113/sq mi)
- Time zone: UTC-5 (PET)
- UBIGEO: 120202

Aco District is one of fifteen districts of the province Concepción in Peru.
