= Putkaqucha (Concepción) =

Mountain in Peru

- Location within Peru

Highest point
- Elevation: 4,800 m (15,700 ft)
- Coordinates: 11°44′27″S 74°56′43″W

Geography
- Location: Peru, Junín Region
- Parent range: Andes

Putkaqucha (Quechua putka muddy (Jauja Quechua), qucha lake, "muddy lake", hispanicized spelling Putcacocha) is a mountain in Peru, about 4,800 m (15,748 ft) high, at a lake of that name. The mountain and the lake are located in the Junín Region, Concepción Province, Andamarca District, northeast of the Waytapallana mountain range. The peak of Putkaqucha is south of Utkhu Warqu.

The lake named Putkaqucha (erroneously also spelled Putcococha) is situated at 11°45′33″S 74°56′44″W.
