= ARA Nueve de Julio =

Several ships of the Argentine Navy have been named Nueve de Julio.

- ARA Nueve de Julio (1892), a protected cruiser.
- ARA Nueve de Julio (C-5), a light cruiser.
