= Pacra =

Mountain in Peru

- Location within Peru

Highest point
- Elevation: 5,118 m (16,791 ft)
- Coordinates: 8°25′23″S 77°50′33″W

Geography
- Location: Ancash, Peru
- Parent range: Andes, Cordillera Blanca

Pacra (possibly from Quechua p'aqra bald, paqra agave) is a mountain in the north of the Cordillera Blanca in the Andes of Peru, of 5,118 metres (16,791 ft) high. It is located in the Ancash Region, Corongo Province, in the north of the Cusca District.
