= Nueve de Julio District =

Nueve de Julio
- District
- Interactive map of Nueve de Julio
- Country: Peru
- Region: Junín
- Province: Concepción
- Founded: January 9, 1962
- Capital: Santo Domingo del Prado

Government
  - Mayor: Dionicio Aeropajito Yupanqui Coronacion

Area
  - Total: 7.28 km^{2} (2.81 sq mi)
- Elevation: 3,326 m (10,912 ft)

Population (2005 census)
  - Total: 1,972
  - Density: 271/km^{2} (702/sq mi)
- Time zone: UTC-5 (PET)
- UBIGEO: 120212

Nueve de Julio District is one of fifteen districts of the province Concepción in Peru.
